= Enteromius kissiensis =

Conservation status
- Data Deficient (IUCN 3.1)

Scientific classification
- Kingdom: Animalia
- Phylum: Chordata
- Class: Actinopterygii
- Order: Cypriniformes
- Family: Cyprinidae
- Subfamily: Smiliogastrinae
- Genus: Enteromius
- Species: E. kissiensis

Binomial name
- Enteromius kissiensis (Daget, 1954)

Synonyms
- Barbus kissiensis Daget, 1954

Species of fish

Enteromius kissiensis is a species of ray-finned fish in the genus Enteromius which has only been recorded from a tributary of upper Niger River system in the highlands of Guinea.
