= Enteromius seymouri =

Scientific classification
- Domain: Eukaryota
- Kingdom: Animalia
- Phylum: Chordata
- Class: Actinopterygii
- Order: Cypriniformes
- Family: Cyprinidae
- Subfamily: Smiliogastrinae
- Genus: Enteromius
- Species: E. seymouri

Binomial name
- Enteromius seymouri (Tweddle & P. H. Skelton, 2008)

Synonyms
- Barbus seymouri

Species of fish

Enteromius seymouri is a species of cyprinid fish in the genus Enteromius which is endemic to Malawi.

== Footnotes ==
- Froese, Rainer; Pauly, Daniel (eds.). "Enteromius seymouri". FishBase.
