= Enteromius castrasibutum =

Conservation status
- Data Deficient (IUCN 3.1)

Scientific classification
- Domain: Eukaryota
- Kingdom: Animalia
- Phylum: Chordata
- Class: Actinopterygii
- Order: Cypriniformes
- Family: Cyprinidae
- Subfamily: Smiliogastrinae
- Genus: Enteromius
- Species: E. castrasibutum

Binomial name
- Enteromius castrasibutum (Fowler, 1936)

Synonyms
- Barbus castrasibutum Fowler, 1936

Species of fish

Enteromius castrasibutum is a species of ray-finned fish in the genus Enteromius which is only known from one location in the upper Congo Basin of the Central African Republic.
