= Enteromius guirali =

Conservation status
- Least Concern (IUCN 3.1)

Scientific classification
- Kingdom: Animalia
- Phylum: Chordata
- Class: Actinopterygii
- Order: Cypriniformes
- Family: Cyprinidae
- Subfamily: Smiliogastrinae
- Genus: Enteromius
- Species: E. guirali

Binomial name
- Enteromius guirali (Thominot, 1886)

Synonyms
- Barbus guirali Thominot, 1886; Barbus melanepiptera Pellegrin, 1924

Species of fish

Enteromius guirali is a species of cyprinid fish. It is endemic to Central Africa and occurs in Cameroon, Gabon, and the Republic of the Congo. It is a benthopelagic freshwater species that grows to 15.5 cm (6.1 in) total length.

== Size ==
This species reaches a length of 15.5 cm (6.1 in).

== Etymology ==
The fish is named in honor of explorer and naturalist Léon Guiral (1858-1885), who collected the type specimen in Zaire in 1885.
