= Enteromius oligogrammus =

Conservation status
- Least Concern (IUCN 3.1)

Scientific classification
- Kingdom: Animalia
- Phylum: Chordata
- Class: Actinopterygii
- Order: Cypriniformes
- Family: Cyprinidae
- Subfamily: Smiliogastrinae
- Genus: Enteromius
- Species: E. oligogrammus

Binomial name
- Enteromius oligogrammus L. R. David, 1937

Synonyms
- Barbus oligogrammus

Species of fish

Enteromius oligogrammus is a species of barb in the family Cyprinidae.

It is found in Burundi and Tanzania. Its natural habitat is rivers. It is not considered a threatened species by the IUCN.
