= Enteromius diamouanganai =

Conservation status
- Least Concern (IUCN 3.1)

Scientific classification
- Kingdom: Animalia
- Phylum: Chordata
- Class: Actinopterygii
- Order: Cypriniformes
- Family: Cyprinidae
- Subfamily: Smiliogastrinae
- Genus: Enteromius
- Species: E. diamouanganai

Binomial name
- Enteromius diamouanganai Teugels & Mamonekene, 1992

Synonyms
- Barbus diamouanganai Tegels & Mamonekene, 1992

Species of fish

Enteromius diamouanganai is a species of ray-finned fish in the genus Enteromius which occurs in rivers in the Congo and Gabon.

== Size ==
This species reaches a length of 11.3 cm (4.4 in).

== Etymology ==
The fish is named in honor of ecologist Jean Diamouangana, who was the UNESCO National Project Director in Mayombe, Congo, who supported the authors’ work.
