= Enteromius yeiensis =

Conservation status
- Data Deficient (IUCN 3.1)

Scientific classification
- Domain: Eukaryota
- Kingdom: Animalia
- Phylum: Chordata
- Class: Actinopterygii
- Order: Cypriniformes
- Family: Cyprinidae
- Subfamily: Smiliogastrinae
- Genus: Enteromius
- Species: E. yeiensis

Binomial name
- Enteromius yeiensis ( Johnsen, 1926)

Synonyms
- Barbus yeiensis

Species of fish

Enteromius yeiensis is a species of ray-finned fish in the genus Enteromius known from Chad and Sudan.
