= Enteromius okae =

Conservation status
- Data Deficient (IUCN 3.1)

Scientific classification
- Kingdom: Animalia
- Phylum: Chordata
- Class: Actinopterygii
- Order: Cypriniformes
- Family: Cyprinidae
- Subfamily: Smiliogastrinae
- Genus: Enteromius
- Species: E. okae

Binomial name
- Enteromius okae (Fowler, 1949)

Synonyms
- Barbus okae

Species of fish

Enteromius okae is a species of cyprinid fish that is endemic to the Republic of Congo. It is only known from Oka River but the fish may be more widespread. It is hunted for food but no exact threats are known.
