= Enteromius candens =

Conservation status
- Least Concern (IUCN 3.1)

Scientific classification
- Domain: Eukaryota
- Kingdom: Animalia
- Phylum: Chordata
- Class: Actinopterygii
- Order: Cypriniformes
- Family: Cyprinidae
- Subfamily: Smiliogastrinae
- Genus: Enteromius
- Species: E. candens

Binomial name
- Enteromius candens (Nichols & Griscom, 1917)

Synonyms
- Barbus candens Nichols & Griscom, 1917

Species of fish

Enteromius candens is a species of ray-finned fish in the genus Enteromius from the upper and middle Congo Basin, where it is known to be harvested for human consumption.
