= Enteromius urostigma =

Conservation status
- Least Concern (IUCN 3.1)

Scientific classification
- Kingdom: Animalia
- Phylum: Chordata
- Class: Actinopterygii
- Order: Cypriniformes
- Family: Cyprinidae
- Subfamily: Smiliogastrinae
- Genus: Enteromius
- Species: E. urostigma

Binomial name
- Enteromius urostigma Boulenger, 1917

Synonyms
- Barbus urostigma

Species of fish

Enteromius urostigma is a species of ray-finned fish in the genus Enteromius which is found in the rivers flowing from Lake Tanganyika and the Lualaba River system.
