= Enteromius kamolondoensis =

Conservation status
- Least Concern (IUCN 3.1)

Scientific classification
- Kingdom: Animalia
- Phylum: Chordata
- Class: Actinopterygii
- Order: Cypriniformes
- Family: Cyprinidae
- Genus: Enteromius
- Species: E. kamolondoensis

Binomial name
- Enteromius kamolondoensis Poll, 1938

Synonyms
- Barbus kamolondoensis Poll, 1938

Species of fish

Enteromius kamolondoensis is a species of ray-finned fish in the genus Enteromius from the Democratic Republic of Congo.
