= Enteromius stanleyi =

Conservation status
- Least Concern (IUCN 3.1)

Scientific classification
- Kingdom: Animalia
- Phylum: Chordata
- Class: Actinopterygii
- Order: Cypriniformes
- Family: Cyprinidae
- Subfamily: Smiliogastrinae
- Genus: Enteromius
- Species: E. stanleyi

Binomial name
- Enteromius stanleyi (Poll & J. P. Gosse, 1974)

Synonyms
- Barbus stanleyi

Species of fish

Enteromius stanleyi is a species of ray-finned fish in the genus Enteromius which is endemic to the Congo River system in the Democratic Republic of the Congo.

The fish was named in the memory of Henry Morton Stanley (1841–1904), "du grand explorateur" of the Congo River Basin.
