= Enteromius chicapaensis =

Conservation status
- Least Concern (IUCN 3.1)

Scientific classification
- Domain: Eukaryota
- Kingdom: Animalia
- Phylum: Chordata
- Class: Actinopterygii
- Order: Cypriniformes
- Family: Cyprinidae
- Subfamily: Smiliogastrinae
- Genus: Enteromius
- Species: E. chicapaensis

Binomial name
- Enteromius chicapaensis (Poll, 1967)

Synonyms
- Barbus chicapaensis Poll, 1967

Species of fish

Enteromius chicapaensis is a species of ray-finned fish in the genus Enteromius which is found in the central Congo Basin of Angola.
