= Enteromius vanderysti =

Conservation status
- Data Deficient (IUCN 3.1)

Scientific classification
- Kingdom: Animalia
- Phylum: Chordata
- Class: Actinopterygii
- Order: Cypriniformes
- Family: Cyprinidae
- Subfamily: Smiliogastrinae
- Genus: Enteromius
- Species: E. vanderysti

Binomial name
- Enteromius vanderysti (Poll, 1945)

Synonyms
- Barbus vanderysti Poll, 1945; Labeobarbus vanderysti (Poll, 1945)

Species of fish

Enteromius vanderysti is a species of ray-finned fish in the genus Enteromius which has only been recorded in the Democratic Republic of Congo.
