= Nyanza barb =

Conservation status
- Least Concern (IUCN 3.1)

Scientific classification
- Kingdom: Animalia
- Phylum: Chordata
- Class: Actinopterygii
- Order: Cypriniformes
- Family: Cyprinidae
- Subfamily: Smiliogastrinae
- Genus: Enteromius
- Species: E. nyanzae

Binomial name
- Enteromius nyanzae (Whitehead, 1960)

Synonyms
- Barbus nyanzae Whitehead, 1960

Species of fish

The Nyanza barb (Enteromius nyanzae) is a species of cyprinid fish.

It is found in Kenya, Rwanda, Tanzania, and Uganda.

Its natural habitats are rivers, freshwater lakes, freshwater marshes, and inland deltas. It is not considered a threatened species by the IUCN.
