= Enteromius devosi =

Scientific classification
- Kingdom: Animalia
- Phylum: Chordata
- Class: Actinopterygii
- Order: Cypriniformes
- Family: Cyprinidae
- Subfamily: Smiliogastrinae
- Genus: Enteromius
- Species: E. devosi

Binomial name
- Enteromius devosi (Banyankimbona, Vreven & Snoeks, 2012)

Synonyms
- Barbus devosi Banyankimbona, Vreven & Snoeks, 2012

Species of fish

Enteromius devosi is a species of ray-finned fish in the genus Enteromius. It is found in the Malagarasi River drainage in Burundi and Tanzania.

== Size ==
This species reaches a length of 7.8 cm (3.1 in).

== Etymology ==
The fish is named in honor of Luc De Vos (1957-2003), who was the first to recognize this species as undescribed and new to science.
