= Enteromius bigornei =

Conservation status
- Least Concern (IUCN 3.1)

Scientific classification
- Kingdom: Animalia
- Phylum: Chordata
- Class: Actinopterygii
- Order: Cypriniformes
- Family: Cyprinidae
- Subfamily: Smiliogastrinae
- Genus: Enteromius
- Species: E. bigornei

Binomial name
- Enteromius bigornei (Lévêque, Teugels & Thys van den Audenaerde, 1988)

Synonyms
- Barbus bigornei Lévêque, Teugels & Thys van den Audenaerde, 1988

Species of fish

Enteromius bigornei is a species of ray-finned fish in the genus Enteromius, it is only found in Little Scarcies basin in Sierra Leone, western Côte d'Ivoire, and eastern Liberia.

== Size ==
This species reaches a length of 11.4 cm (4.5 in).

== Etymology ==
The fish is named in honor of Rémy Bigorne (b. 1954), an ichthyologist, of ORSTOM (Office de la Recherche Scientifique et Technique d’Outre-Mer).
