= Enteromius carcharhinoides =

Conservation status
- Critically Endangered (IUCN 3.1)

Scientific classification
- Domain: Eukaryota
- Kingdom: Animalia
- Phylum: Chordata
- Class: Actinopterygii
- Order: Cypriniformes
- Family: Cyprinidae
- Subfamily: Smiliogastrinae
- Genus: Enteromius
- Species: E. carcharhinoides

Binomial name
- Enteromius carcharhinoides (Stiassny, 1991)

Synonyms
- Barbus carcharhinoides Stiassny, 1991

Species of fish

Enteromius carcharhinoides is a species of ray-finned fish in the genus Enteromius.It is only found at one location on the River Via which is part of the St. Paul's River system in Liberia.
