= Enteromius brevilateralis =

Conservation status
- Data Deficient (IUCN 3.1)

Scientific classification
- Kingdom: Animalia
- Phylum: Chordata
- Class: Actinopterygii
- Order: Cypriniformes
- Family: Cyprinidae
- Subfamily: Smiliogastrinae
- Genus: Enteromius
- Species: E. brevilateralis

Binomial name
- Enteromius brevilateralis Poll, 1967

Synonyms
- Barbus brevilateralis Poll, 1967

Species of fish

Enteromius brevilateralis is a species of ray-finned fish in the genus Enteromius from the upper Kwanza in Angola.
