= Enteromius nigrifilis =

Conservation status
- Data Deficient (IUCN 3.1)

Scientific classification
- Kingdom: Animalia
- Phylum: Chordata
- Class: Actinopterygii
- Order: Cypriniformes
- Family: Cyprinidae
- Subfamily: Smiliogastrinae
- Genus: Enteromius
- Species: E. nigrifilis

Binomial name
- Enteromius nigrifilis (Nichols, 1928)

Synonyms
- Barbus nigrifilis Nichols, 1928

Species of fish

Enteromius nigrifilis is a species of ray-finned fish in the genus Enteromius, it is found in the Democratic Republic of the Congo.
