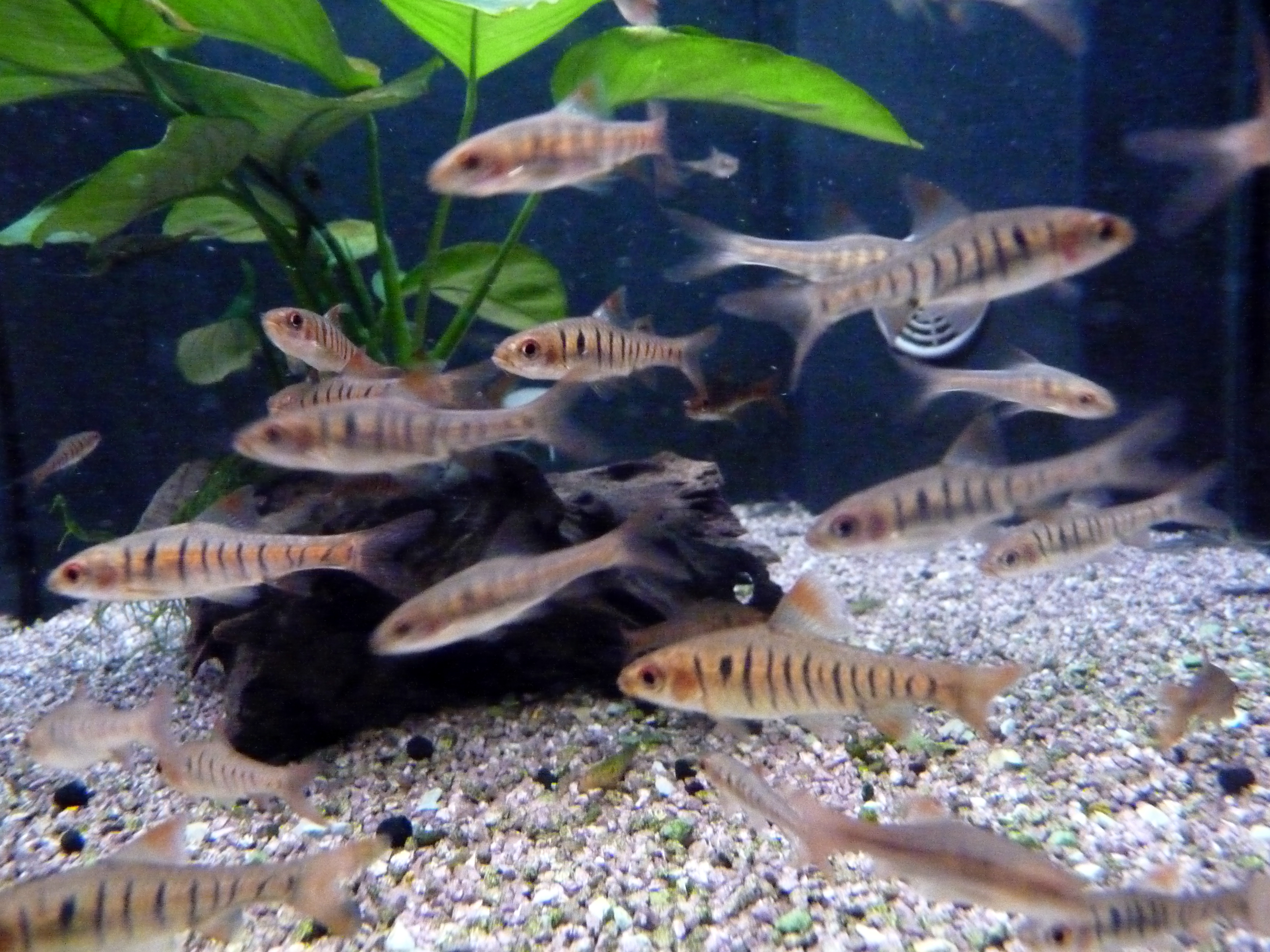
- African banded barb (Enteromius fasciolatus)

Scientific classification
- Kingdom: Animalia
- Phylum: Chordata
- Class: Actinopterygii
- Order: Cypriniformes
- Family: Cyprinidae
- Subfamily: Smiliogastrinae
- Genus: Enteromius; Cope, 1867

Type species
- Enteromius potamogalis Cope, 1867

Synonyms
- Afropuntius Karaman, 1971; Agrammobarbus Pellegrin, 1935; Beirabarbus Herre, 1936; Estevea Whitley, 1953; Hemigrammocapoeta Estève, 1952; Hemigrammopuntius Pellegrin, 1923; Mannichthys Schultz, 1942; Nicholsopuntius Pellegrin, 1933; Parapuntius Karaman, 1971; Vanderbiltella Fowler, 1936

= Enteromius =

Genus of cyprinid fishes

Enteromius is a genus of small to medium-sized cyprinid fish native to tropical Africa. Most species were placed in the genus Barbus.

Several species are only known from the type specimens, and their status and continuing existence must be confirmed. As many of these are from Lake Victoria, which underwent massive ecological upheaval after Nile perch (Lates nilosus) were introduced, some of them likely have not survived, either.

== Species ==
Species in this genus are:

- Enteromius ablabes (Bleeker, 1863)
- Enteromius aboinensis Boulenger, 1911
- Enteromius afrohamiltoni Crass, 1960 (Hamilton's barb)
- Enteromius afrovernayi Nichols & Boulton (fi), 1927 (Spottail barb)
- Enteromius akakianus (Boulenger, 1911)
- Enteromius alberti (Poll, 1939)
- Enteromius aliciae Bigorne & Lévêque, 1993
- Enteromius aloyi Román, 1971
- Enteromius amanpoae Lambert, 1961
- Enteromius amatolicus P. H. Skelton, 1990 (Amatola barb)
- Enteromius amboseli (Banister, 1980)
- Enteromius anema (Boulenger, 1903)
- Enteromius annectens Gilchrist & W. W. Thompson, 1917 (Broad-striped barb)
- Enteromius anniae (Lévêque, 1983)
- Enteromius anoplus M. C. W. Weber, 1897 (Chubbyhead barb)
- Enteromius ansorgii (Boulenger, 1904)
- Enteromius apleurogramma Boulenger, 1911 (East African red-finned barb)
- Enteromius arambourgi Pellegrin, 1935
- Enteromius arcislongae Keilhack, 1908
- Enteromius argenteus Günther, 1868 (Rosefin barb)
- Enteromius aspilus (Boulenger, 1907)
- Enteromius atakorensis Daget, 1957
- Enteromius atkinsoni R. G. Bailey, 1969 (Dashdot barb)
- Enteromius atromaculatus Nichols & Griscom, 1917
- Enteromius bagbwensis Norman, 1932
- Enteromius baleensis Prokofiev, Levin & Golubtsov, 2021
- Enteromius barnardi Jubb, 1965 (Blackback barb)
- Enteromius barotseensis Pellegrin, 1920 (Barotse barb)
- Enteromius baudoni (Boulenger, 1918)
- Enteromius bawkuensis A. J. Hopson, 1965
- Enteromius bifrenatus Fowler, 1935 (Hyphen barb)
- Enteromius bigornei Lévêque, Teugels & Thys van den Audenaerde, 1988
- Enteromius boboi L. P. Schultz, 1942
- Enteromius bourdariei (Pellegrin, 1928)
- Enteromius brachygramma (Boulenger, 1915) (Line-spotted ufipa barb)
- Enteromius brazzai (Pellegrin, 1901)
- Enteromius breviceps Trewavas, 1936 (Short-head barb)
- Enteromius brevidorsalis (Boulenger, 1915) (Dwarf barb)
- Enteromius brevilateralis (Poll, 1967)
- Enteromius brevipinnis (Jubb, 1966) (Shortfin barb)
- Enteromius brichardi (Poll & Lambert, 1959)
- Enteromius cadenati Daget, 1962
- Enteromius callipterus (Boulenger, 1907) (Clipper barb)
- Enteromius camptacanthus (Bleeker, 1863) (African red-finned barb)
- Enteromius candens (Nichols & Griscom, 1917)
- Enteromius carcharhinoides Stiassny, 1991.
- Enteromius carens Boulenger, 1912
- Enteromius castrasibutum Fowler, 1936
- Enteromius catenarius Poll & J. G. Lambert, 1959
- Enteromius caudosignatus Poll, 1967
- Enteromius cerinus Ilodiri, Huyghe, Costa, Baba, Mizani & Vreven, 2024
- Enteromius cernuus (Barnard, 1938)
- Enteromius chicapaensis (Poll, 1967)
- Enteromius chiumbeensis Pellegrin, 1936
- Enteromius chlorotaenia (Boulenger, 1911)
- Enteromius choloensis Norman, 1925 (Silver barb)
- Enteromius citrinus (Boulenger, 1920)
- Enteromius clauseni (Thys van den Audenaerde 1976)
- Enteromius collarti (Poll, 1945)
- Enteromius condei Mahnert & Géry, 1982
- Enteromius crocodilensis (Fowler, 1934)
- Enteromius deguidei Matthes, 1964
- Enteromius deserti (Pellegrin, 1909)
- Enteromius devosi Banyankimbona, Vreven & Snoeks, 2012
- Enteromius dialonensis (Daget, 1962)
- Enteromius diamouanganai Teugels & Mamonekene, 1992
- Enteromius ditinensis Daget, 1962
- Enteromius dorsolineatus Trewavas, 1936 (Cunene barb)
- Enteromius eburneensis (Poll, 1941)
- Enteromius erythrozonus (Poll & J. G. Lambert, 1959)
- Enteromius eutaenia Boulenger, 1904 (Orangefin barb)
- Enteromius evansi (Fowler, 1930)
- Enteromius fasciolatus Günther, 1868 (African banded barb)
- Enteromius foutensis (Lévêque, Teugels & Thys van den Audenaerde, 1988)
- Enteromius gamo Englmaier, Chai, Wubie, Collins & Getahun, 2024
- Enteromius greenwoodi Poll, 1967
- Enteromius guildi Loiselle, 1973
- Enteromius guineensis Pellegrin, 1913
- Enteromius guirali (Thominot 1886)
- Enteromius gurneyi (Günther, 1868) (Redtail barb)
- Enteromius haasianus L. R. David, 1936 (Sickle barb)
- Enteromius holotaenia (Boulenger, 1904) (Spotscale barb)
- Enteromius huguenyi (Bigorne & Lévêque, 1993)
- Enteromius hulstaerti (Poll, 1945) (Butterfly barb)
- Enteromius humeralis (Boulenger, 1902)
- Enteromius humilis (Boulenger, 1902)
- Enteromius inaequalis (Lévêque, Teugels & Thys van den Audenaerde, 1988)
- Enteromius innocens Pfeffer, 1896 (Inconspicuous barb)
- Enteromius jacksoni Günther, 1889 (Jackson's barb)
- Enteromius jae Boulenger, 1903 (Jae barb)
- Enteromius janssensi (Poll, 1976)
- Enteromius kamolondoensis Poll, 1938
- Enteromius karkensis (Gilchrist & Thompson, 1913) (uMgeni Chubbyhead barb)
- Enteromius kerstenii W. K. H. Peters, 1868 (Redspot barb)
- Enteromius kessleri (Steindachner, 1866) (Gillbar barb)
- Enteromius kissiensis (Daget, 1954)
- Enteromius kuiluensis (Pellegrin, 1930)
- Enteromius lamani Lönnberg & Rendahl (de), 1920
- Enteromius laticeps (Pfeffer, 1889)
- Enteromius lauzannei (Lévêque & Paugy, 1982)
- Enteromius leonensis (Boulenger, 1915)
- Enteromius liberiensis (Steindachner, 1894)
- Enteromius lineomaculatus (Boulenger, 1903) (Linespotted barb)
- Enteromius litamba (Keilhack, 1908)
- Enteromius lornae Ricardo-Bertram, 1943
- Enteromius loveridgii (Boulenger, 1916)
- Enteromius lufukiensis (Boulenger, 1917)
- Enteromius luikae (Ricardo, 1939) (Luika barb)
- Enteromius lujae (Boulenger, 1913)
- Enteromius lukindae (Boulenger, 1915)
- Enteromius lukusiensis (David & Poll, 1937)
- Enteromius luluae (Fowler, 1930)
- Enteromius machadoi (Poll, 1967)
- Enteromius macinensis (Daget, 1954)
- Enteromius macrops (Boulenger, 1911) (Blackstripe barb)
- Enteromius macrotaenia (Worthington, 1933) (Broadband barb)
- Enteromius magdalenae (Boulenger, 1906) (Bunjako barb)
- Enteromius mandelai Kambikambi, Kadye & Chakona, 2021 (Eastern chubbyhead barb)
- Enteromius manicensis (Pellegrin, 1920) (Yellow barb)
- Enteromius marmoratus (David & Poll, 1937)
- Enteromius martorelli Román, 1971
- Enteromius matthesi (Poll & Gosse, 1963)
- Enteromius mattozi A. R. P. Guimarães, 1884 (Papermouth)
- Enteromius mediosquamatus (Poll, 1967)
- Enteromius melanotaenia (Stiassny, 1991)
- Enteromius mimus (Boulenger, 1912) (Euasso Nyiro barb)
- Enteromius miolepis (Boulenger, 1902) (Zigzag barb)
- Enteromius mocoensis (Trewavas, 1936)
- Enteromius mohasicus Pappenheim, 1914
- Enteromius motebensis Steindachner, 1894 (Marico barb)
- Enteromius multilineatus (Worthington, 1933) (Copperstripe barb)
- Enteromius musumbi (Boulenger, 1910)
- Enteromius neefi (Greenwood, 1962) (Sidespot barb)
- Enteromius neglectus (Boulenger, 1903)
- Enteromius neumayeri (J. G. Fischer, 1884) (Neumayer's barb)
- Enteromius nigeriensis (Boulenger, 1903)
- Enteromius niggie Scheepers, Bragança & Chakona, 2024 (Southern sidespot barb)
- Enteromius nigrifilis (Nichols, 1928)
- Enteromius nigroluteus (Pellegrin, 1930)
- Enteromius niokoloensis (Daget, 1959)
- Enteromius nounensis (Van den Bergh & Teugels, 1998)
- Enteromius nyanzae (Whitehead, 1960) (Nyanza barb)
- Enteromius nzigidaherai Bigirimana, Kisekelwa, Costa, Huyghe, Banyankimbona & Vreven, 2024
- Enteromius okae (Fowler, 1949)
- Enteromius oligogrammus (David, 1937)
- Enteromius olivaceus (Seegers, 1996) (Olive-green ufipa barb)
- Enteromius oraniensis (Barnard, 1943) (Gariep chubbyhead barb)
- Enteromius owenae (Ricardo-Bertram, 1943)
- Enteromius pallidus (A. Smith, 1841) (Goldie barb)
- Enteromius paludinosus (Peters, 1852) (Straightfin barb)
- Enteromius papilio (Banister & R. G. Bailey, 1979
- Enteromius parablabes (Daget, 1957)
- Enteromius parajae (Van den Bergh & Teugels, 1998)
- Enteromius pellegrini (Poll, 1939) (Pellegrin's barb)
- Enteromius perince (Rüppell, 1835) (Three-spot barb)
- Enteromius petchkovskyi (Poll, 1967)
- Enteromius pinnimaculatus Mipounga, Cutler, Mve Beh, Adam & Sidlauskas, 2019
- Enteromius pleurogramma (Boulenger, 1902)
- Enteromius pobeguini (Pellegrin, 1911)
- Enteromius poechii (Steindachner, 1911) (Dashtail barb)
- Enteromius potamogalis Cope, 1867
- Enteromius prionacanthus (Mahnert & Géry, 1982)
- Enteromius profundus (Greenwood, 1970)
- Enteromius pseudotoppini (Seegers, 1996)
- Enteromius pumilus (Boulenger, 1901)
- Enteromius punctitaeniatus (Daget, 1954)
- Enteromius pygmaeus (Poll & Gosse, 1963)
- Enteromius quadrilineatus (David, 1937)
- Enteromius quadripunctatus (Pfeffer, 1896) (Four-spotted barb)
- Enteromius radari Kisekelwa, Snoeks, Decru, Schedel, Isumbisho & Vreven, 2022
- Enteromius radiatus (Peters, 1853) (Redeye barb)
- Enteromius raimbaulti (Daget, 1962)
- Enteromius rohani (Pellegrin, 1922)
- Enteromius roussellei (Ladiges & Voelker, 1961)
- Enteromius rouxi (Daget, 1962)
- Enteromius rubrostigma (Poll & Lambert, 1964)
- Enteromius ruforum Ilodiri, Huyghe, Costa, Baba, Mizani & Vreven, 2024
- Enteromius salessei (Pellegrin, 1908)
- Enteromius sensitivus (Roberts, 2010)
- Enteromius serengetiensis (Farm 2000)
- Enteromius sexradiatus (Boulenger, 1911) (Kavirondo barb)
- Enteromius seymouri (Tweddle & Skelton, 2008)
- Enteromius stanleyi (Poll & Gosse, 1974)
- Enteromius stauchi (Daget, 1967)
- Enteromius stigmasemion (Fowler, 1936).
- Enteromius stigmatopygus (Boulenger, 1903)
- Enteromius subinensis (A. J. Hopson 1965)
- Enteromius sublineatus (Daget, 1954)
- Enteromius sylvaticus (Loiselle & Welcomme, 1971)
- Enteromius syntrechalepis (Fowler, 1949)
- Enteromius taeniopleura (Boulenger, 1917)
- Enteromius taeniurus (Boulenger, 1903)
- Enteromius tanapelagius (de Graaf, Dejen, Sibbing & Osse, 2000)
- Enteromius tangandensis (Jubb, 1954) (Redspot barb)
- Enteromius tegulifer (Fowler, 1936)
- Enteromius tetrastigma (Boulenger, 1913)
- Enteromius teugelsi (Bamba, Vreven & Snoeks, 2011)
- Enteromius thamalakanensis (Fowler, 1935) (Thamalakane barb)
- Enteromius thespesios Manda, Snoeks, Decru, Bills & Vreven, 2020
- Enteromius thysi (Trewavas, 1974)
- Enteromius tiekoroi (Lévêque, Teugels & Thys van den Audenaerde, 1987)
- Enteromius tomiensis (Fowler, 1936)
- Enteromius tongaensis (Rendahl, 1935)
- Enteromius toppini (Boulenger, 1916) (East Coast barb)
- Enteromius traorei (Lévêque, Teugels & Thys van den Audenaerde, 1987)
- Enteromius treurensis (Groenewald, 1958) (Treur barb)
- Enteromius trimaculatus (Peters, 1852) (Threespot barb)
- Enteromius trinotatus (Fowler, 1936)
- Enteromius trispiloides (Lévêque, Teugels & Thys van den Audenaerde, 1987)
- Enteromius trispilomimus (Boulenger, 1907)
- Enteromius trispilopleura (Boulenger, 1902)
- Enteromius trispilos (Bleeker, 1863)
- Enteromius tshopoensis (De Vos, 1991)
- Enteromius turkanae (A. J. Hopson & J. Hopson, 1982) (Lake Turkana barb)
- Enteromius unitaeniatus (Günther, 1867) (Slender barb)
- Enteromius urostigma (Boulenger, 1917)
- Enteromius usambarae (Lönnberg, 1907)
- Enteromius validus (Stiassny, Liyandja & Monsembula Iyaba, 2016)
- Enteromius vanderysti (Poll, 1945)
- Enteromius vandewallei Lederoun & Vreven, 2016
- Enteromius venustus (R. G. Bailey, 1980) (Red Pangani barb)
- Enteromius viktorianus (Lohberger, 1929) (Victoria barb)
- Enteromius viviparus (Weber, 1897) (Bowstripe barb)
- Enteromius walkeri (Boulenger, 1904)
- Enteromius walshae Mamonekene, Ibala Zamba & Stiassny, 2018
- Enteromius wellmani (Boulenger, 1911)
- Enteromius werneri (Boulenger, 1905)
- Enteromius yardiensis Englmaier, Tesfaye & Bogutskaya, 2020
- Enteromius yeiensis (S. Johnsen, 1926)
- Enteromius yongei (Whitehead, 1960) (Nzoia barb)
- Enteromius zalbiensis (Blache & Miton, 1960)
- Enteromius zanzibaricus (Peters, 1868) (Zanzibar barb)
