= Enteromius lauzannei =

Conservation status
- Vulnerable (IUCN 3.1)

Scientific classification
- Domain: Eukaryota
- Kingdom: Animalia
- Phylum: Chordata
- Class: Actinopterygii
- Order: Cypriniformes
- Family: Cyprinidae
- Genus: Enteromius
- Species: E. lauzannei

Binomial name
- Enteromius lauzannei (Lévêque & Paugy, 1982)

Synonyms
- Barbus lauzannei Lévêque & Paugy, 1982

Species of fish

Enteromius lauzannei is a species of ray-finned fish in the genus Enteromius which has only been recorded from the upper course of the River Lofa in Guinea.
