= Enteromius liberiensis =

Scientific classification
- Domain: Eukaryota
- Kingdom: Animalia
- Phylum: Chordata
- Class: Actinopterygii
- Order: Cypriniformes
- Family: Cyprinidae
- Subfamily: Smiliogastrinae
- Genus: Enteromius
- Species: E. liberiensis

Binomial name
- Enteromius liberiensis (Steindachner, 1894)

Synonyms
- Barbus liberiensis Steindachner, 1894

Species of fish

Enteromius liberiensis is a species of ray-finned fish in the genus Enteromius from Sierra Leone and Liberia.

== Footnotes ==
- Froese, Rainer; Pauly, Daniel (eds.). "Enteromius liberiensis". FishBase.
