= Enteromius amanpoae =

Conservation status
- Least Concern (IUCN 3.1)

Scientific classification
- Kingdom: Animalia
- Phylum: Chordata
- Class: Actinopterygii
- Order: Cypriniformes
- Family: Cyprinidae
- Subfamily: Smiliogastrinae
- Genus: Enteromius
- Species: E. amanpoae

Binomial name
- Enteromius amanpoae (J. G. Lambert, 1961)

Synonyms
- Barbus amanpoae J.G. Lambert, 1961

Species of fish

Enteromius amanpoae is a species of cyprinid fish endemic to the Democratic Republic of the Congo where it is found in the Amanpoa River and the Uele River. This species reaches a length of 4 centimetres (1.6 in) TL.
