= Nzoia barb =

Conservation status
- Least Concern (IUCN 3.1)

Scientific classification
- Kingdom: Animalia
- Phylum: Chordata
- Class: Actinopterygii
- Order: Cypriniformes
- Family: Cyprinidae
- Subfamily: Smiliogastrinae
- Genus: Enteromius
- Species: E. yongei

Binomial name
- Enteromius yongei (Whitehead, 1960)

Synonyms
- Barbus yongei Whitehead, 1960

Species of fish

The Nzoia barb (Enteromius yongei) is a species of cyprinid fish. It is found in the Lake Victoria and Lake Kyoga basins in Kenya and Uganda. It can grow to 5.6 cm (2.2 in) standard length.

Its natural habitats are rivers and streams. It is not considered a threatened species by the IUCN.
