= Enteromius arcislongae =

Conservation status
- Least Concern (IUCN 3.1)

Scientific classification
- Kingdom: Animalia
- Phylum: Chordata
- Class: Actinopterygii
- Order: Cypriniformes
- Family: Cyprinidae
- Subfamily: Smiliogastrinae
- Genus: Enteromius
- Species: E. arcislongae

Binomial name
- Enteromius arcislongae Keilhack, 1908

Synonyms
- Barbus arcislongae Keilhack, 1908

Species of fish

Enteromius arcislongae is a species of ray-finned fish in the family Cyprinidae. It is endemic to Lake Malawi, and is found in Malawi, Mozambique, and Tanzania. Its natural habitats are rivers and freshwater lakes.
