= Broadstriped barb =

Conservation status
- Least Concern (IUCN 3.1)

Scientific classification
- Kingdom: Animalia
- Phylum: Chordata
- Class: Actinopterygii
- Order: Cypriniformes
- Family: Cyprinidae
- Genus: Enteromius
- Species: E. annectens

Binomial name
- Enteromius annectens (Gilchrist & W. W. Thompson, 1917)

Synonyms
- Barbus annectens Gilchrist & W.W. Thompson, 1917

Species of fish

The broadstriped barb (Enteromius annectens) is a species of ray-finned fish in the genus Enteromius.

It is known to be widely distributed on the coastal plain of south-east Africa, but may be a species complex.
