= Neumayer's barb =

Conservation status
- Least Concern (IUCN 3.1)

Scientific classification
- Kingdom: Animalia
- Phylum: Chordata
- Class: Actinopterygii
- Order: Cypriniformes
- Family: Cyprinidae
- Subfamily: Smiliogastrinae
- Genus: Enteromius
- Species: E. neumayeri

Binomial name
- Enteromius neumayeri (J. G. Fischer, 1884)

Synonyms
- Barbus neumayeri

Species of fish

Neumayer's barb (Enteromius neumayeri) is a species of cyprinid fish.

It is found in Burundi, Kenya, Rwanda, Tanzania, and Uganda. Its natural habitats are rivers, intermittent rivers, freshwater lakes, freshwater marshes, and inland deltas. It is not considered a threatened species by the IUCN.
