= Thamalakane barb =

Conservation status
- Least Concern (IUCN 3.1)

Scientific classification
- Domain: Eukaryota
- Kingdom: Animalia
- Phylum: Chordata
- Class: Actinopterygii
- Order: Cypriniformes
- Family: Cyprinidae
- Subfamily: Smiliogastrinae
- Genus: Enteromius
- Species: E. thamalakanensis

Binomial name
- Enteromius thamalakanensis (Fowler, 1935)

Synonyms
- Barbus thamalakanensis

Species of fish

Thamalakane barb (Enteromius thamalakanensis) is a species of cyprinid fish in the genus Enteromius, which occurs in the Okavango and upper Zambezi river systems.

== Footnotes ==
- Froese, Rainer; Pauly, Daniel (eds.). "Enteromius thamalakanensis". FishBase.
