= Kavirondo barb =

Conservation status
- Data Deficient (IUCN 3.1)

Scientific classification
- Kingdom: Animalia
- Phylum: Chordata
- Class: Actinopterygii
- Order: Cypriniformes
- Family: Cyprinidae
- Subfamily: Smiliogastrinae
- Genus: Enteromius
- Species: E. sexradiatus

Binomial name
- Enteromius sexradiatus (Boulenger, 1911)

Synonyms
- Barbus sexradiatus

Species of fish

The Kavirondo barb (Enteromius sexradiatus) is a species of cyprinid fish.

It is found only in Kenya. Its natural habitat is freshwater lakes. Its status is insufficiently known.
