= Enteromius evansi =

Conservation status
- Least Concern (IUCN 3.1)

Scientific classification
- Domain: Eukaryota
- Kingdom: Animalia
- Phylum: Chordata
- Class: Actinopterygii
- Order: Cypriniformes
- Family: Cyprinidae
- Subfamily: Smiliogastrinae
- Genus: Enteromius
- Species: E. evansi

Binomial name
- Enteromius evansi Fowler, 1930

Synonyms
- Barbus evansi Fowler, 1930

Species of fish

Enteromius evansi is a species of ray-finned fish in the genus Enteromius from the Catumbela and Kwanza river systems in Angola.

== Size ==
This species reaches a length of 4.1 cm (1.6 in).

== Etymology ==
The fish is named in honor of J. R. Evans, who accompanied Fowler on the Gray African Expedition in Angola.
