= Enteromius sensitivus =

Scientific classification
- Domain: Eukaryota
- Kingdom: Animalia
- Phylum: Chordata
- Class: Actinopterygii
- Order: Cypriniformes
- Family: Cyprinidae
- Subfamily: Smiliogastrinae
- Genus: Enteromius
- Species: E. sensitivus

Binomial name
- Enteromius sensitivus (T. R. Roberts, 2010)

Synonyms
- Barbus sensitivus

Species of fish

Enteromius sensitivus is a species of ray-finned fish in the genus Enteromius which is found only in the Sanaga River in Cameroon.

== Footnotes ==
- Froese, Rainer; Pauly, Daniel (eds.). "Enteromius sensitivus". FishBase.
