= Olivegreen ufipa barb =

Conservation status
- Least Concern (IUCN 3.1)

Scientific classification
- Kingdom: Animalia
- Phylum: Chordata
- Class: Actinopterygii
- Order: Cypriniformes
- Family: Cyprinidae
- Subfamily: Smiliogastrinae
- Genus: Enteromius
- Species: E. olivaceus

Binomial name
- Enteromius olivaceus Seegers, 1996

Synonyms
- Barbus olivaceus

Species of fish

The olivegreen ufipa barb (Enteromius olivaceus) is an East-African species of freshwater fish in the family Cyprinidae.

It is found only in Tanzania. Its natural habitat is rivers. It is not considered a threatened species by the IUCN.
