= Enteromius prionacanthus =

Conservation status
- Least Concern (IUCN 3.1)

Scientific classification
- Domain: Eukaryota
- Kingdom: Animalia
- Phylum: Chordata
- Class: Actinopterygii
- Order: Cypriniformes
- Family: Cyprinidae
- Genus: Enteromius
- Species: E. prionacanthus

Binomial name
- Enteromius prionacanthus (Mahnert & Géry, 1982)

Synonyms
- Barbus prionacanthus

Species of fish

Enteromius prionacanthus is a species of ray-finned fish in the genus Enteromius which is endemic to Gabon.
