= Enteromius taeniopleura =

Conservation status
- Least Concern (IUCN 3.1)

Scientific classification
- Kingdom: Animalia
- Phylum: Chordata
- Class: Actinopterygii
- Order: Cypriniformes
- Family: Cyprinidae
- Subfamily: Smiliogastrinae
- Genus: Enteromius
- Species: E. taeniopleura

Binomial name
- Enteromius taeniopleura (Boulenger, 1917)

Synonyms
- Barbus taeniopleura

Species of fish

Enteromius taeniopleura is a species of ray-finned fish in the family Cyprinidae. It is found in Burundi, Democratic Republic of the Congo, Tanzania, and Zambia. Its natural habitat is rivers.
