= Enteromius roussellei =

Conservation status
- Data Deficient (IUCN 3.1)

Scientific classification
- Domain: Eukaryota
- Kingdom: Animalia
- Phylum: Chordata
- Class: Actinopterygii
- Order: Cypriniformes
- Family: Cyprinidae
- Subfamily: Smiliogastrinae
- Genus: Enteromius
- Species: E. roussellei

Binomial name
- Enteromius roussellei Ladiges & Voelker, 1961

Synonyms
- Barbus roussellei

Species of fish

Enteromius roussellei is a species of ray-finned fish in the genus Enteromius which is endemic to the Longa River in Angola.
