= Enteromius sublineatus =

Conservation status
- Least Concern (IUCN 3.1)

Scientific classification
- Kingdom: Animalia
- Phylum: Chordata
- Class: Actinopterygii
- Order: Cypriniformes
- Family: Cyprinidae
- Subfamily: Smiliogastrinae
- Genus: Enteromius
- Species: E. sublineatus

Binomial name
- Enteromius sublineatus (Daget, 1954)

Synonyms
- Barbus sublineatus

Species of fish

Enteromius sublineatus is a species of ray-finned fish in the genus Enteromius from West Africa.
