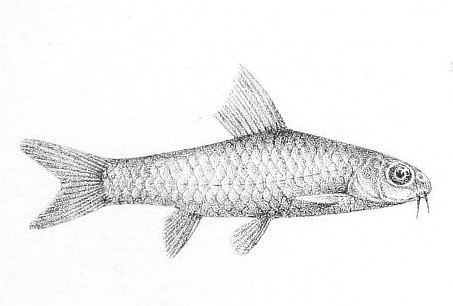

Conservation status
- Least Concern (IUCN 3.1)

Scientific classification
- Domain: Eukaryota
- Kingdom: Animalia
- Phylum: Chordata
- Class: Actinopterygii
- Order: Cypriniformes
- Family: Cyprinidae
- Subfamily: Smiliogastrinae
- Genus: Enteromius
- Species: E. nigeriensis

Binomial name
- Enteromius nigeriensis (Boulenger, 1903)

Synonyms
- Barbus nigeriensis Boulenger, 1903; Puntius nigeriensis (Boulenger, 1903)

= Enteromius nigeriensis =

Species of fish

Enteromius nigeriensis is a species of ray-finned fish in the genus Enteromius which is found from Togo to Sudan.

== Footnotes ==
- Froese, Rainer; Pauly, Daniel (eds.). "Enteromius nigeriensis". FishBase.
