= Enteromius lamani =

Conservation status
- Data Deficient (IUCN 3.1)

Scientific classification
- Kingdom: Animalia
- Phylum: Chordata
- Class: Actinopterygii
- Order: Cypriniformes
- Family: Cyprinidae
- Subfamily: Smiliogastrinae
- Genus: Enteromius
- Species: E. lamani

Binomial name
- Enteromius lamani (Lönnberg & Rendahl (de), 1920)

Synonyms
- Barbus lamani Lönnberg & Rendahl, 1920

Species of fish

Enteromius lamani is a species of ray-finned fish in the genus Enteromius which has been recorded from a single location in the Democratic Republic of the Congo.
