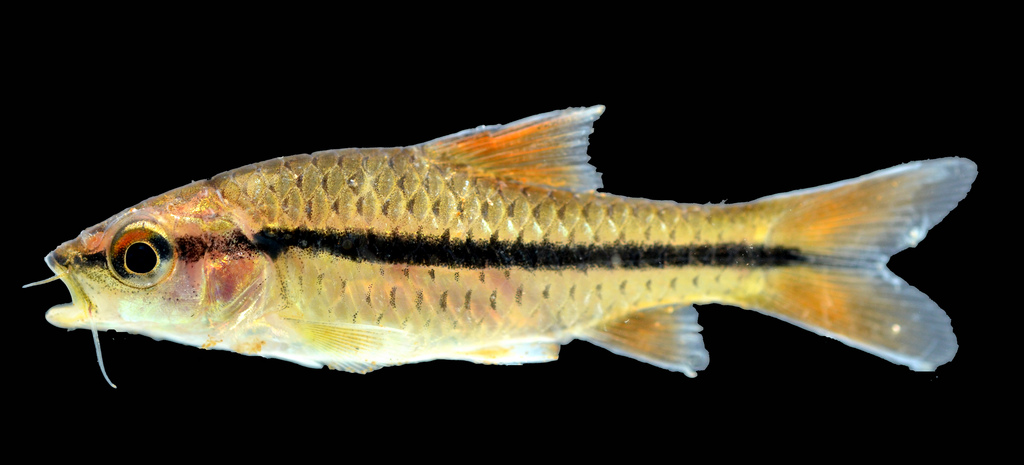

Conservation status
- Least Concern (IUCN 3.1)

Scientific classification
- Domain: Eukaryota
- Kingdom: Animalia
- Phylum: Chordata
- Class: Actinopterygii
- Order: Cypriniformes
- Family: Cyprinidae
- Subfamily: Smiliogastrinae
- Genus: Enteromius
- Species: E. holotaenia

Binomial name
- Enteromius holotaenia Boulenger, 1904

Synonyms
- Barbus holotaenia Boulenger, 1904; Puntius holotaenia (Boulenger, 1904)

= Spotscale barb =

Species of fish

Spotscale barb (Enteromius holotaenia) is a species of ray-finned fish in the genus Enteromius which occurs in western central Africa from Cameroon south to Angola.

== Footnotes ==
- Froese, Rainer; Pauly, Daniel (eds.). "Enteromius holotaenia". FishBase.
