= Enteromius tetrastigma =

Conservation status
- Data Deficient (IUCN 3.1)

Scientific classification
- Kingdom: Animalia
- Phylum: Chordata
- Class: Actinopterygii
- Order: Cypriniformes
- Family: Cyprinidae
- Subfamily: Smiliogastrinae
- Genus: Enteromius
- Species: E. tetrastigma

Binomial name
- Enteromius tetrastigma (Boulenger, 1913)

Synonyms
- Barbus tetrastigma

Species of fish

Enteromius tetrastigma is a species of ray-finned fish in the genus Enteromius which is endemic to Democratic Republic of the Congo.
