= Enteromius tiekoroi =

Conservation status
- Near Threatened (IUCN 3.1)

Scientific classification
- Kingdom: Animalia
- Phylum: Chordata
- Class: Actinopterygii
- Order: Cypriniformes
- Family: Cyprinidae
- Subfamily: Smiliogastrinae
- Genus: Enteromius
- Species: E. tiekoroi

Binomial name
- Enteromius tiekoroi (Lévêque, Teugels & Thys van den Audenaerde, 1987)

Synonyms
- Barbus tiekoroi

Species of fish

Enteromius tiekoroi is a species of ray-finned fish in the genus Enteromius, it is found in Guinea and Sierra Leone.
