= Enteromius collarti =

Conservation status
- Vulnerable (IUCN 3.1)

Scientific classification
- Domain: Eukaryota
- Kingdom: Animalia
- Phylum: Chordata
- Class: Actinopterygii
- Order: Cypriniformes
- Family: Cyprinidae
- Subfamily: Smiliogastrinae
- Genus: Enteromius
- Species: E. collarti

Binomial name
- Enteromius collarti (Poll, 1945)

Synonyms
- Barbus collarti Poll, 1945

Species of fish

Enteromius collarti is a species of ray-finned fish in the genus Enteromius which is only found in Angola.

== Size ==
This species reaches a length of 3.5 cm (1.4 in).

== Etymology ==
The fish is named in honor of entomologist Albert Collart (1899-1993), who collected the type specimen.
