= Victoria barb =

Conservation status
- Data Deficient (IUCN 3.1)

Scientific classification
- Kingdom: Animalia
- Phylum: Chordata
- Class: Actinopterygii
- Order: Cypriniformes
- Family: Cyprinidae
- Subfamily: Smiliogastrinae
- Genus: Enteromius
- Species: E. viktorianus

Binomial name
- Enteromius viktorianus (Lohberger, 1929)

Synonyms
- Barbus viktorianus

Species of fish

The Victoria barb (Enteromius viktorianus) is a species of ray-finned fish in the family Cyprinidae. It is found only in Kenya. Its natural habitat is Lake Victoria. Its status is insufficiently known, and only two specimens have been collected.
