= Lake Turkana barb =

Conservation status
- Vulnerable (IUCN 3.1)

Scientific classification
- Kingdom: Animalia
- Phylum: Chordata
- Class: Actinopterygii
- Order: Cypriniformes
- Family: Cyprinidae
- Subfamily: Smiliogastrinae
- Genus: Enteromius
- Species: E. turkanae

Binomial name
- Enteromius turkanae A. J. Hopson & J. Hopson, 1982

Synonyms
- Barbus turkanae

Species of fish

The Lake Turkana barb (Enteromius turkanae) is a species of ray-finned fish in the family Cyprinidae. It is endemic to Lake Turkana in Kenya. It is considered a Vulnerable species by the IUCN.
