= Enteromius nounensis =

Conservation status
- Least Concern (IUCN 3.1)

Scientific classification
- Kingdom: Animalia
- Phylum: Chordata
- Class: Actinopterygii
- Order: Cypriniformes
- Family: Cyprinidae
- Subfamily: Smiliogastrinae
- Genus: Enteromius
- Species: E. nounensis

Binomial name
- Enteromius nounensis (Van den Bergh & Teugels, 1998)

Synonyms
- Barbus nounensis Ven den Bergh & Teugels, 1998

Species of fish

Enteromius nounensis is a species of ray-finned fish in the genus Enteromius, it is endemic to Cameroon.

== Footnotes ==
- Froese, Rainer; Pauly, Daniel (eds.). "Enteromius nounensis". FishBase.
