= Enteromius humilis =

Scientific classification
- Domain: Eukaryota
- Kingdom: Animalia
- Phylum: Chordata
- Class: Actinopterygii
- Order: Cypriniformes
- Family: Cyprinidae
- Subfamily: Smiliogastrinae
- Genus: Enteromius
- Species: E. humilis

Binomial name
- Enteromius humilis Boulenger, 1902

Synonyms
- Barbus humilis Boulenger, 1902

Species of fish

Enteromius humilis is a species of ray-finned fish in the genus Enteromius. It is endemic to Ethiopia.

== Footnotes ==
- Froese, Rainer; Pauly, Daniel (eds.). "Enteromius humilis". FishBase.
