= Linespotted Ufipa barb =

Conservation status
- Data Deficient (IUCN 3.1)

Scientific classification
- Kingdom: Animalia
- Phylum: Chordata
- Class: Actinopterygii
- Order: Cypriniformes
- Family: Cyprinidae
- Subfamily: Smiliogastrinae
- Genus: Enteromius
- Species: E. brachygramma

Binomial name
- Enteromius brachygramma (Boulenger, 1915)

Synonyms
- Barbus brachygramma Boulenger, 1915

Species of fish

The Linespotted Ufipa barb (Enteromius brachygramma) is a rare species African freshwater cyprinid fish. It is only known from a small affluent of the Lukinda in the Lake Mweru system of the Congo River basin, in D.R. Congo.
