= Enteromius potamogalis =

Scientific classification
- Domain: Eukaryota
- Kingdom: Animalia
- Phylum: Chordata
- Class: Actinopterygii
- Order: Cypriniformes
- Family: Cyprinidae
- Genus: Enteromius
- Species: E. potamogalis

Binomial name
- Enteromius potamogalis (Cope, 1867)

Synonyms
- Barbus potamogalis

Species of fish

Enteromius potamogalis is a species of ray-finned fish in the genus Enteromius from the Rio Muni in Equatorial Guinea.
