= Enteromius teugelsi =

Scientific classification
- Kingdom: Animalia
- Phylum: Chordata
- Class: Actinopterygii
- Order: Cypriniformes
- Family: Cyprinidae
- Subfamily: Smiliogastrinae
- Genus: Enteromius
- Species: E. teugelsi

Binomial name
- Enteromius teugelsi (Bamba, Vreven & J. Snoeks, 2011)

Synonyms
- Barbus teugelsi

Species of fish

Enteromius teugelsi is a species of ray-finned fish in the genus Enteromius. Its distribution is the Little Scarcies River basin in Guinea.
