= Enteromius loveridgii =

Conservation status
- Vulnerable (IUCN 3.1)

Scientific classification
- Kingdom: Animalia
- Phylum: Chordata
- Class: Actinopterygii
- Order: Cypriniformes
- Family: Cyprinidae
- Subfamily: Smiliogastrinae
- Genus: Enteromius
- Species: E. loveridgii

Binomial name
- Enteromius loveridgii (Boulenger, 1916)

Synonyms
- Barbus loveridgii Boulenger, 1916

Species of fish

Enteromius loveridgii is a species of ray-finned fish in the family Cyprinidae. It is vulnerable species endemic to the southern Lake Victoria basin in Kenya.
