= Enteromius parajae =

Conservation status
- Least Concern (IUCN 3.1)

Scientific classification
- Kingdom: Animalia
- Phylum: Chordata
- Class: Actinopterygii
- Order: Cypriniformes
- Family: Cyprinidae
- Subfamily: Smiliogastrinae
- Genus: Enteromius
- Species: E. parajae

Binomial name
- Enteromius parajae Van den Bergh & Teugels, 1998

Synonyms
- Barbus parajae

Species of fish

Enteromius parajae is a species of ray-finned fish in the genus Enteromius which is endemic to Cameroon.

== Footnotes ==
- Froese, Rainer; Pauly, Daniel (eds.). "Enteromius parajae". FishBase.
