= Copperstripe barb =

Conservation status
- Least Concern (IUCN 3.1)

Scientific classification
- Domain: Eukaryota
- Kingdom: Animalia
- Phylum: Chordata
- Class: Actinopterygii
- Order: Cypriniformes
- Family: Cyprinidae
- Subfamily: Smiliogastrinae
- Genus: Enteromius
- Species: E. multilineatus

Binomial name
- Enteromius multilineatus Worthington, 1933

Synonyms
- Barbus multilineatus Worthington, 1933; Barbus carpenteri (Fowler, 1949); Puntius carpenteri Fowler, 1949

Species of fish

The copperstripe barb (Enteromius multilineatus) is a species of cyprinid fish in the genus Enteromius which occurs in central Africa from the Congo Basin to the Zambezi.
