= Enteromius nigroluteus =

Conservation status
- Endangered (IUCN 3.1)

Scientific classification
- Domain: Eukaryota
- Kingdom: Animalia
- Phylum: Chordata
- Class: Actinopterygii
- Order: Cypriniformes
- Family: Cyprinidae
- Subfamily: Smiliogastrinae
- Genus: Enteromius
- Species: E. nigroluteus

Binomial name
- Enteromius nigroluteus (Pellegrin, 1930)

Synonyms
- Barbus nigroluteus Pellegrin, 1930

Species of fish

Enteromius nigroluteus is a species of ray-finned fish in the genus Enteromius which is endemic to the Congo.

== Footnotes ==
- Froese, Rainer; Pauly, Daniel (eds.). "Enteromius nigroluteus". FishBase.
