= Amatola barb =

Conservation status
- Data Deficient (IUCN 3.1)

Scientific classification
- Kingdom: Animalia
- Phylum: Chordata
- Class: Actinopterygii
- Order: Cypriniformes
- Family: Cyprinidae
- Subfamily: Smiliogastrinae
- Genus: Enteromius
- Species: E. amatolicus

Binomial name
- Enteromius amatolicus P. H. Skelton, 1990

Synonyms
- Barbus amatolicus Skelton, 1990

Species of fish

The Amatola barb (Enteromius amatolicus) is a species of cyprinid fish in the genus Enteromius.

It is endemic to South Africa, where it is threatened by the presence of invasive species and destruction of its habitat.
