= Enteromius parablabes =

Conservation status
- Least Concern (IUCN 3.1)

Scientific classification
- Domain: Eukaryota
- Kingdom: Animalia
- Phylum: Chordata
- Class: Actinopterygii
- Order: Cypriniformes
- Family: Cyprinidae
- Genus: Enteromius
- Species: E. parablabes

Binomial name
- Enteromius parablabes Daget, 1957

Synonyms
- Barbus parablabes

Species of fish

Enteromius parablabes is a species of ray-finned fish in the genus Enteromius which is endemic to Benin.
