= Enteromius citrinus =

Conservation status
- Data Deficient (IUCN 3.1)

Scientific classification
- Kingdom: Animalia
- Phylum: Chordata
- Class: Actinopterygii
- Order: Cypriniformes
- Family: Cyprinidae
- Subfamily: Smiliogastrinae
- Genus: Enteromius
- Species: E. citrinus

Binomial name
- Enteromius citrinus (Boulenger, 1920)

Synonyms
- Barbus citrinus Boulenger, 1920

Species of fish

Enteromius citrinus is a species of ray-finned fish in the genus Enteromius which occurs only on the central Congo Basin in the Democratic Republic of Congo.
