= Enteromius carens =

Conservation status
- Least Concern (IUCN 3.1)

Scientific classification
- Domain: Eukaryota
- Kingdom: Animalia
- Phylum: Chordata
- Class: Actinopterygii
- Order: Cypriniformes
- Family: Cyprinidae
- Subfamily: Smiliogastrinae
- Genus: Enteromius
- Species: E. carens

Binomial name
- Enteromius carens (Boulenger, 1912)

Synonyms
- Barbus carens Boulenger, 1912

Species of fish

Enteromius carens is a species of ray-finned fish in the genus Enteromius which is found in the lower Congo Basin in the Congo, Democratic Republic of Congo and Cabinda Province of Angola.

== Footnotes ==
- Froese, Rainer; Pauly, Daniel (eds.). "Enteromius carens". FishBase.
