= Enteromius machadoi =

Conservation status
- Data Deficient (IUCN 3.1)

Scientific classification
- Domain: Eukaryota
- Kingdom: Animalia
- Phylum: Chordata
- Class: Actinopterygii
- Order: Cypriniformes
- Family: Cyprinidae
- Subfamily: Smiliogastrinae
- Genus: Enteromius
- Species: E. machadoi

Binomial name
- Enteromius machadoi (Poll, 1967)

Synonyms
- Barbus machadoi Poll, 1967

Species of fish

Enteromius machadoi is a species of ray-finned fish in the genus Enteromius from the Democratic Republic of the Congo.

== Footnotes ==
- Froese, Rainer; Pauly, Daniel (eds.). "Enteromius machadoi". FishBase.
