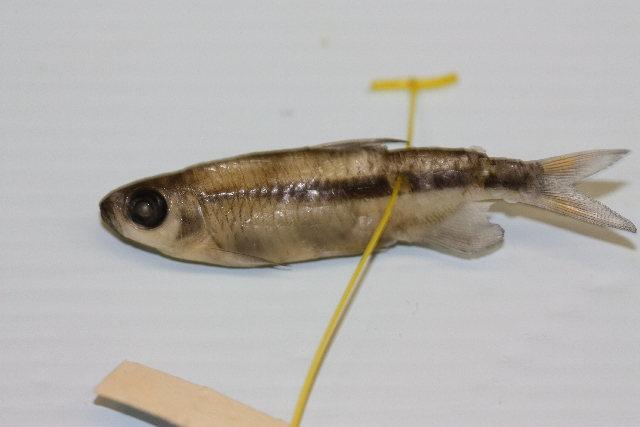

Conservation status
- Least Concern (IUCN 3.1)

Scientific classification
- Kingdom: Animalia
- Phylum: Chordata
- Class: Actinopterygii
- Order: Cypriniformes
- Family: Cyprinidae
- Subfamily: Smiliogastrinae
- Genus: Enteromius
- Species: E. viviparus

Binomial name
- Enteromius viviparus (M. C. W. Weber, 1897)

Synonyms
- Barbus viviparus

= Bowstripe barb =

Species of fish

The bowstripe barb (Enteromius viviparus) is a species of cyprinid fish in the genus Enteromius. This species is native to Southern Africa.

The males become golden in colour while the females remain silver-brown. Both sexes have a dark stripe running longitudinally along the flanks.

The specific epithet viviparus ("viviparous") is in error; they lay eggs just like all other Enteromius. Fry have been noted in the lower reaches of slow flowing streams entering rivers, while adults have been noted amongst aquatic vegetation on river margins and in quiet pools in rapids.
