= Enteromius validus =

Scientific classification
- Kingdom: Animalia
- Phylum: Chordata
- Class: Actinopterygii
- Order: Cypriniformes
- Family: Cyprinidae
- Subfamily: Smiliogastrinae
- Genus: Enteromius
- Species: E. validus

Binomial name
- Enteromius validus Stiassny, Liyandja & Monsembula Iyaba, 2016

Synonyms
- Barbus validus

Species of fish

Enteromius validus is a species of ray-finned fish in the family Cyprinidae. It is endemic to the Democratic Republic of the Congo, where it inhabits the N’sele River and Mayi Ndombe River in the Congo River basin. Its natural habitat is freshwater marshes.
