= Enteromius usambarae =

Conservation status
- Least Concern (IUCN 3.1)

Scientific classification
- Kingdom: Animalia
- Phylum: Chordata
- Class: Actinopterygii
- Order: Cypriniformes
- Family: Cyprinidae
- Subfamily: Smiliogastrinae
- Genus: Enteromius
- Species: E. usambarae

Binomial name
- Enteromius usambarae Lönnberg, 1907

Synonyms
- Barbus usambarae

Species of fish

Enteromius usambarae is a species of ray-finned fish in the family Cyprinidae. It is found only in Tanzania. Its natural habitat is freshwater marshes.
