= Enteromius papilio =

Conservation status
- Data Deficient (IUCN 3.1)

Scientific classification
- Kingdom: Animalia
- Phylum: Chordata
- Class: Actinopterygii
- Order: Cypriniformes
- Family: Cyprinidae
- Subfamily: Smiliogastrinae
- Genus: Enteromius
- Species: E. papilio

Binomial name
- Enteromius papilio Banister & R. G. Bailey, 1979

Synonyms
- Barbus papilio

Species of fish

Enteromius papilio is a species of ray-finned fish in the genus Enteromius.
