= Enteromius neglectus =

Conservation status
- Least Concern (IUCN 3.1)

Scientific classification
- Domain: Eukaryota
- Kingdom: Animalia
- Phylum: Chordata
- Class: Actinopterygii
- Order: Cypriniformes
- Family: Cyprinidae
- Subfamily: Smiliogastrinae
- Genus: Enteromius
- Species: E. neglectus

Binomial name
- Enteromius neglectus Boulenger, 1903

Synonyms
- Barbus neglectus Boulenger, 1903; Labeobarbus neglectus (Boulenger, 1903)

Species of fish

Enteromius neglectus is a species of ray-finned fish in the genus Enteromius which is found in the River Nile from Egypt to Ethiopia.
