= Enteromius thysi =

Conservation status
- Endangered (IUCN 3.1)

Scientific classification
- Domain: Eukaryota
- Kingdom: Animalia
- Phylum: Chordata
- Class: Actinopterygii
- Order: Cypriniformes
- Family: Cyprinidae
- Subfamily: Smiliogastrinae
- Genus: Enteromius
- Species: E. thysi

Binomial name
- Enteromius thysi (Trewavas, 1974)

Synonyms
- Barbus thysi

Species of fish

Enteromius thysi is a species of ray-finned fish in the genus Enteromius which is found in coastal rivers in south-western Cameroon and Bioko.
