= Enteromius luluae =

Conservation status
- Least Concern (IUCN 3.1)

Scientific classification
- Kingdom: Animalia
- Phylum: Chordata
- Class: Actinopterygii
- Order: Cypriniformes
- Family: Cyprinidae
- Subfamily: Smiliogastrinae
- Genus: Enteromius
- Species: E. luluae

Binomial name
- Enteromius luluae (Fowler, 1930)

Synonyms
- Barbus luluae Fowler, 1930

Species of fish

Enteromius luluae is a species of ray-finned fish in the genus Enteromius from the Democratic Republic of the Congo.
