= Enteromius lukindae =

Conservation status
- Data Deficient (IUCN 3.1)

Scientific classification
- Kingdom: Animalia
- Phylum: Chordata
- Class: Actinopterygii
- Order: Cypriniformes
- Family: Cyprinidae
- Subfamily: Smiliogastrinae
- Genus: Enteromius
- Species: E. lukindae

Binomial name
- Enteromius lukindae (Boulenger, 1915)

Synonyms
- Barbus lukindae Boulenger, 1915

Species of fish

Enteromius lukindae is a species of ray-finned fish in the genus Enteromius which has only been recorded from a tributary of the Lukinda River, South Katanga in the Democratic Republic of the Congo.
