= Enteromius trispilomimus =

Scientific classification
- Domain: Eukaryota
- Kingdom: Animalia
- Phylum: Chordata
- Class: Actinopterygii
- Order: Cypriniformes
- Family: Cyprinidae
- Subfamily: Smiliogastrinae
- Genus: Enteromius
- Species: E. trispilomimus

Binomial name
- Enteromius trispilomimus Boulenger, 1907

Synonyms
- Barbus trispilomimus

Species of fish

Enteromius trispilomimus is a species of ray-finned fish in the genus Enteromius which occurs in coastal rivers from Cameroon to the Chiloango River on the border between the Angolan exclave of Cabinda and the Democratic republic of the Congo.
