= Enteromius deguidei =

Conservation status
- Data Deficient (IUCN 3.1)

Scientific classification
- Kingdom: Animalia
- Phylum: Chordata
- Class: Actinopterygii
- Order: Cypriniformes
- Family: Cyprinidae
- Subfamily: Smiliogastrinae
- Genus: Enteromius
- Species: E. deguidei

Binomial name
- Enteromius deguidei (Matthes, 1964)

Synonyms
- Barbus deguidei Matthes, 1964

Species of fish

Enteromius deguidei is a species of ray-finned fish in the genus Enteromius which has been recorded from a single location in the Democratic Republic of Congo (DRC).

== Size ==
This species reaches a length of 3.7 cm (1.5 in).

== Etymology ==
The fish is named in honor of R. Deguide, of the Musée Royal de l’Afrique Centrale, for his assistance during Hubert Matthes’ research in the Ikela region of the DRC.
