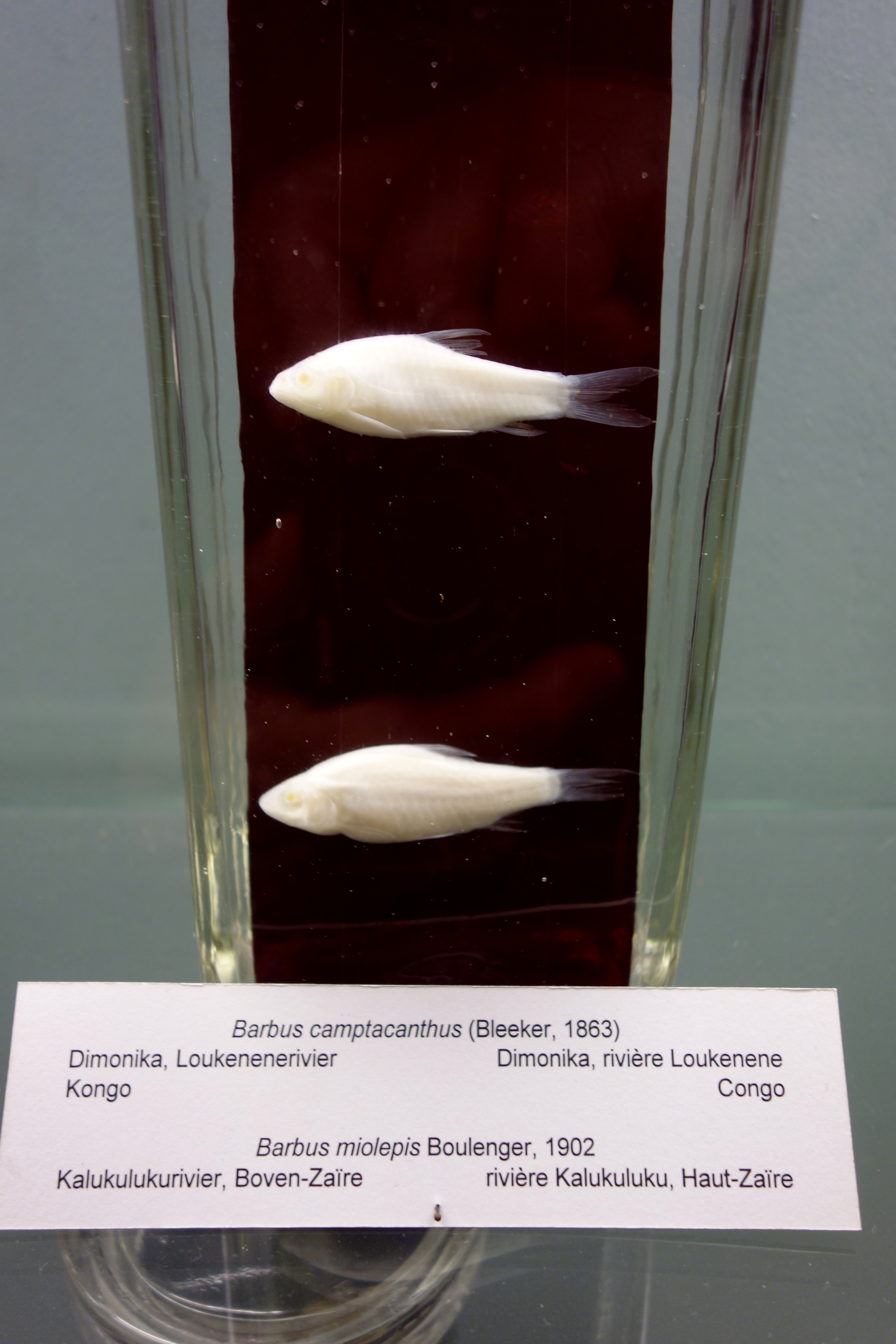
- African redfinned barb (top)

Conservation status
- Least Concern (IUCN 3.1)

Scientific classification
- Kingdom: Animalia
- Phylum: Chordata
- Class: Actinopterygii
- Order: Cypriniformes
- Family: Cyprinidae
- Genus: Enteromius
- Species: E. camptacanthus

Binomial name
- Enteromius camptacanthus (Bleeker, 1863)

Synonyms
- Puntius camptacanthus Bleeker, 1863; Barbodes camptacanthus (Bleeker, 1863); Barbus camptacanthus (Bleeker, 1863); Puntius tholonianus Thominot, 1886

= African redfinned barb =

Species of fish

The African redfinned barb (Enteromius camptacanthus) is a species of ray-finned fish in the genus Enteromius. It is found from the Niger Delta to the Congo Basin.
