= Enteromius anniae =

Conservation status
- Endangered (IUCN 3.1)

Scientific classification
- Kingdom: Animalia
- Phylum: Chordata
- Class: Actinopterygii
- Order: Cypriniformes
- Family: Cyprinidae
- Subfamily: Smiliogastrinae
- Genus: Enteromius
- Species: E. anniae

Binomial name
- Enteromius anniae Lévêque, 1983

Synonyms
- Barbus anniae Lévêque, 1983

Species of fish

Enteromius anniae is a species of ray-finned fish in the genus Enteromius. It has only been recorded from the River Koumba, a tributary of the Tominé/Corubal River in Guinea and Guinea-Bissau.

== Size ==
This species reaches a length of 8.3 cm (3.3 in).

== Etymology ==
The fish is named in honor of Lévêque's wife Annie.
