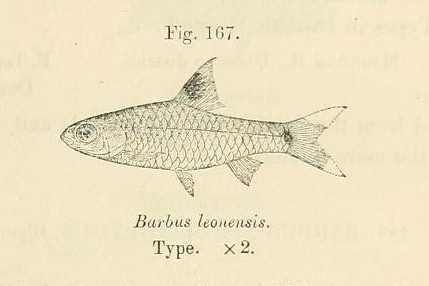

Conservation status
- Least Concern (IUCN 3.1)

Scientific classification
- Domain: Eukaryota
- Kingdom: Animalia
- Phylum: Chordata
- Class: Actinopterygii
- Order: Cypriniformes
- Family: Cyprinidae
- Genus: Enteromius
- Species: E. leonensis

Binomial name
- Enteromius leonensis (Boulenger, 1915)

Synonyms
- Barbus leonensis Boulenger, 1915

= Enteromius leonensis =

Species of fish

Enteromius leonensis is a species of ray-finned fish in the genus Enteromius which is found from Senegal to Sudan.
