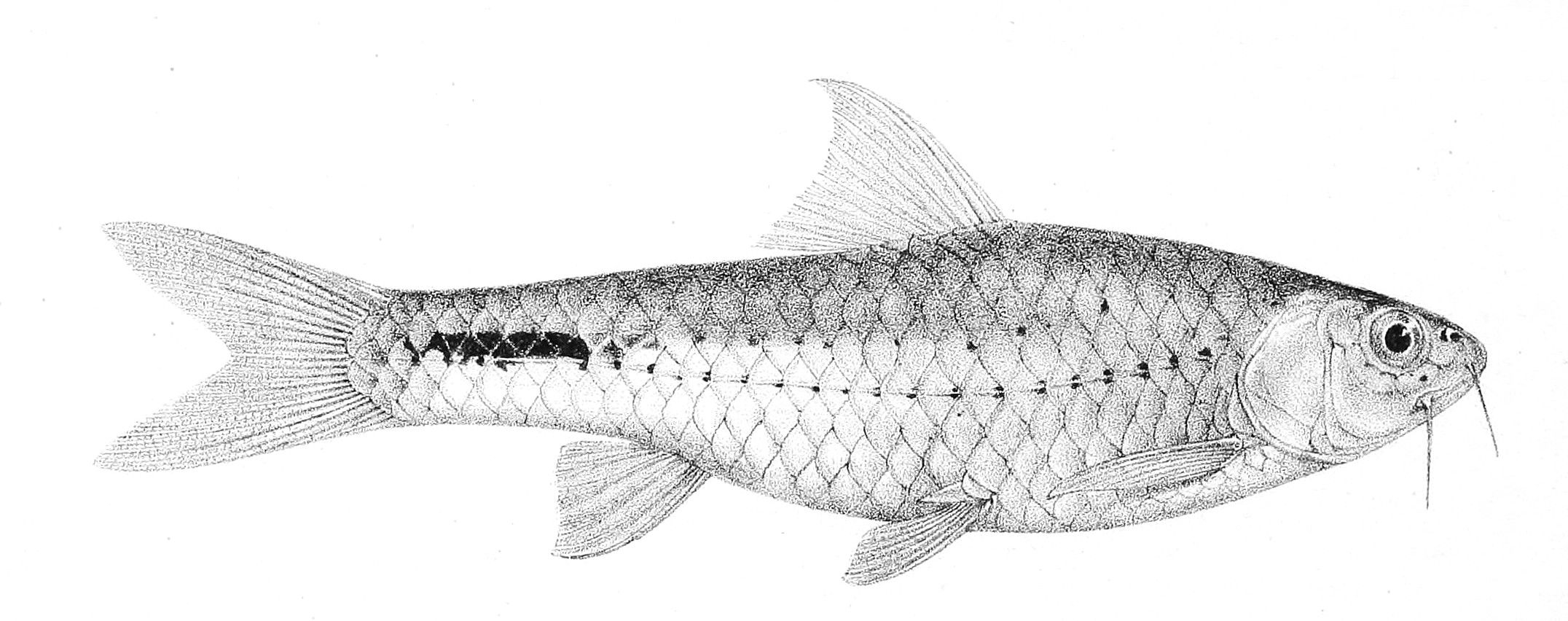

Conservation status
- Vulnerable (IUCN 3.1)

Scientific classification
- Domain: Eukaryota
- Kingdom: Animalia
- Phylum: Chordata
- Class: Actinopterygii
- Order: Cypriniformes
- Family: Cyprinidae
- Subfamily: Smiliogastrinae
- Genus: Enteromius
- Species: E. taeniurus

Binomial name
- Enteromius taeniurus (Boulenger, 1903)

Synonyms
- Barbus taeniurus

= Enteromius taeniurus =

Species of fish

Enteromius taeniurus is a species of ray-finned fish in the genus Enteromius. It has a body length of about 12 cm and is classified as vulnerable by the IUCN. It is endemic to Cameroon. It is a freshwater tropical fish.
