= Enteromius guildi =

Conservation status
- Least Concern (IUCN 3.1)

Scientific classification
- Domain: Eukaryota
- Kingdom: Animalia
- Phylum: Chordata
- Class: Actinopterygii
- Order: Cypriniformes
- Family: Cyprinidae
- Subfamily: Smiliogastrinae
- Genus: Enteromius
- Species: E. guildi

Binomial name
- Enteromius guildi (Loiselle, 1973)

Synonyms
- Barbus guildi Loiselle, 1973

Species of fish

Enteromius guildi is a species of ray-finned fish in the genus Enteromius which is found only in the upper reached of the River Hedjo on the border between Togo and Ghana.

== Size ==
This species reaches a length of 5.6 cm (2.2 in).

== Etymology ==
The fish is named in honor of Paul D. Guild (b. 1943), a Peace Corps colleague of the describer for three years in the Republic of Togo.
