= Enteromius chlorotaenia =

Conservation status
- Least Concern (IUCN 3.1)

Scientific classification
- Domain: Eukaryota
- Kingdom: Animalia
- Phylum: Chordata
- Class: Actinopterygii
- Order: Cypriniformes
- Family: Cyprinidae
- Subfamily: Smiliogastrinae
- Genus: Enteromius
- Species: E. chlorotaenia

Binomial name
- Enteromius chlorotaenia (Boulenger, 1911)

Synonyms
- Barbus chlorotaenia Boulenger, 1911

Species of fish

Enteromius chlorotaenia is a species of ray-finned fish in the genus Enteromius from Togo, Benin, Nigeria, Cameroon and Chad.
