= Enteromius pumilus =

Conservation status
- Least Concern (IUCN 3.1)

Scientific classification
- Kingdom: Animalia
- Phylum: Chordata
- Class: Actinopterygii
- Order: Cypriniformes
- Family: Cyprinidae
- Subfamily: Smiliogastrinae
- Genus: Enteromius
- Species: E. pumilus

Binomial name
- Enteromius pumilus (Boulenger, 1901)

Synonyms
- Barbus pumilus

Species of fish

Enteromius pumilus is a species of ray-finned fish in the genus Enteromius from Sudan and Ethiopia, possibly Chad.

== Footnotes ==
- Froese, Rainer; Pauly, Daniel (eds.). "Enteromius pumilus". FishBase.
