= Enteromius janssensi =

Conservation status
- Least Concern (IUCN 3.1)

Scientific classification
- Kingdom: Animalia
- Phylum: Chordata
- Class: Actinopterygii
- Order: Cypriniformes
- Family: Cyprinidae
- Genus: Enteromius
- Species: E. janssensi

Binomial name
- Enteromius janssensi (Poll, 1976)

Synonyms
- Barbus janssensi Poll, 1976

Species of fish

Enteromius janssensi is a species of ray-finned fish in the genus Enteromius from the Democratic Republic of Congo.

== Size ==
This species reaches a length of 4.0 cm (1.6 in).

== Etymology ==
The fish's name is dedicated to the memory of entomologist André Janssens (1906-1954), who participated in a large-scale faunal survey (1946-1949) of Upemba National Park in the Democratic Republic of the Congo, the type specimen locality.
