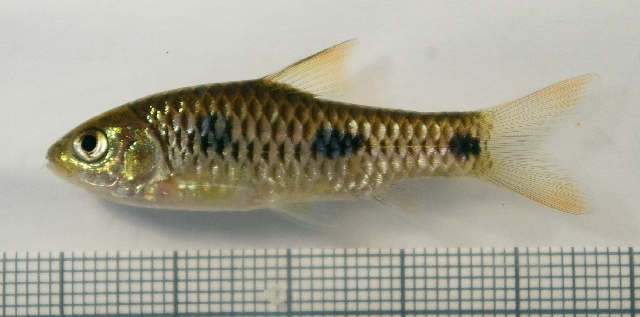

Conservation status
- Least Concern (IUCN 3.1)

Scientific classification
- Domain: Eukaryota
- Kingdom: Animalia
- Phylum: Chordata
- Class: Actinopterygii
- Order: Cypriniformes
- Family: Cyprinidae
- Subfamily: Smiliogastrinae
- Genus: Enteromius
- Species: E. trispilos

Binomial name
- Enteromius trispilos (Bleeker, 1863)

Synonyms
- Barbus trispilos

= Enteromius trispilos =

Species of fish

Enteromius trispilos is a species of ray-finned fish in the genus Enteromius that lives in West Africa.
