= Enteromius subinensis =

Conservation status
- Endangered (IUCN 3.1)

Scientific classification
- Domain: Eukaryota
- Kingdom: Animalia
- Phylum: Chordata
- Class: Actinopterygii
- Order: Cypriniformes
- Family: Cyprinidae
- Subfamily: Smiliogastrinae
- Genus: Enteromius
- Species: E. subinensis

Binomial name
- Enteromius subinensis (A. J. Hopson, 1965

Synonyms
- Barbus subinensis

Species of fish

Enteromius subinensis is a species of ray-finned fish in the genus Enteromius which is endemic to Ghana.
