= Gillbar barb =

Conservation status
- Least Concern (IUCN 3.1)

Scientific classification
- Kingdom: Animalia
- Phylum: Chordata
- Class: Actinopterygii
- Order: Cypriniformes
- Family: Cyprinidae
- Subfamily: Smiliogastrinae
- Genus: Enteromius
- Species: E. kessleri

Binomial name
- Enteromius kessleri (Steindachner, 1866)

Synonyms
- Puntius kessleri Steindachner, 1866; Barbus kessleri (Steindachner, 1866); Barbus caudimacula Günther, 1868; Puntius caudimacula (Günther, 1868)

Species of fish

The gillbar barb (Enteromius kessleri) is a species of cyprinid fish in the genus Enteromius from Angola and the Democratic Republic of Congo.

== Size ==
This species reaches a length of 7.7 cm (3.0 in).

== Etymology ==
The Etyfish Project states that the patronym not identified but probably in honor of German-Russian zoologist Karl Federovich Kessler (1815–1881), who described many more cyprinids.
