= Enteromius rohani =

Scientific classification
- Domain: Eukaryota
- Kingdom: Animalia
- Phylum: Chordata
- Class: Actinopterygii
- Order: Cypriniformes
- Family: Cyprinidae
- Subfamily: Smiliogastrinae
- Genus: Enteromius
- Species: E. rohani

Binomial name
- Enteromius rohani (Pellegrin, 1921)

Synonyms
- Barbus rohani

Species of fish

Enteromius rohani is a species of ray-finned fish in the genus Enteromius.
