= Enteromius alberti =

Conservation status
- Least Concern (IUCN 3.1)

Scientific classification
- Kingdom: Animalia
- Phylum: Chordata
- Class: Actinopterygii
- Order: Cypriniformes
- Family: Cyprinidae
- Subfamily: Smiliogastrinae
- Genus: Enteromius
- Species: E. alberti

Binomial name
- Enteromius alberti (Poll, 1939)

Synonyms
- Barbus alberti Poll, 1939; Barbus cercops Whitehead, 1960; Entermius cercops (Whitehead, 1960

Species of fish

Enteromius alberti, commonly known as the Luambwa barb, is a species of cyprinid fish in the genus Enteromius. It is found in river systems throughout the Lake Edward and Lake Victoria basins.
