= Enteromius atakorensis =

Conservation status
- Least Concern (IUCN 3.1)

Scientific classification
- Kingdom: Animalia
- Phylum: Chordata
- Class: Actinopterygii
- Order: Cypriniformes
- Family: Cyprinidae
- Subfamily: Smiliogastrinae
- Genus: Enteromius
- Species: E. atakorensis

Binomial name
- Enteromius atakorensis (Daget, 1957)

Synonyms
- Barbus atakorensis Daget, 1957

Species of fish

Enteromius atakorensis is a species of cyprinid fish. It is endemic to West Africa, being found in Nigeria west to Ghana and Burkina Faso. It is a benthopelagic freshwater species that grows to 3.6 cm (1.4 in) standard length.
