= Enteromius profundus =

Conservation status
- Least Concern (IUCN 3.1)

Scientific classification
- Kingdom: Animalia
- Phylum: Chordata
- Class: Actinopterygii
- Order: Cypriniformes
- Family: Cyprinidae
- Subfamily: Smiliogastrinae
- Genus: Enteromius
- Species: E. profundus

Binomial name
- Enteromius profundus Greenwood, 1970

Synonyms
- Barbus profundus

Species of fish

Enteromius profundus is a species of ray-finned fish in the genus Enteromius which is endemic to Lake Victoria where it was severely reduced by non native fishes but has recovered and is now regarded as not endangered.
