= Enteromius quadrilineatus =

Conservation status
- Endangered (IUCN 3.1)

Scientific classification
- Kingdom: Animalia
- Phylum: Chordata
- Class: Actinopterygii
- Order: Cypriniformes
- Family: Cyprinidae
- Subfamily: Smiliogastrinae
- Genus: Enteromius
- Species: E. quadrilineatus

Binomial name
- Enteromius quadrilineatus (L. R. David, 1937)

Synonyms
- Barbus lineomaculatus quadrilineatus Barbus quadralineatus Enteromius quadralineatus [orth. error on IUCN Red List]

Species of fish

Enteromius quadrilineatus is a cyprinid fish species in the family Cyprinidae. It is found in Burundi and Tanzania.

Its natural habitat is rivers. It is threatened by habitat loss.
