= Enteromius trinotatus =

Conservation status
- Data Deficient (IUCN 3.1)

Scientific classification
- Kingdom: Animalia
- Phylum: Chordata
- Class: Actinopterygii
- Order: Cypriniformes
- Family: Cyprinidae
- Subfamily: Smiliogastrinae
- Genus: Enteromius
- Species: E. trinotatus

Binomial name
- Enteromius trinotatus Fowler, 1936

Synonyms
- Barbus trinotatus

Species of fish

Enteromius trinotatus is a species of ray-finned fish in the genus Enteromius which is only found in the Democratic Republic of the Congo.
