= Enteromius lukusiensis =

Conservation status
- Least Concern (IUCN 3.1)

Scientific classification
- Kingdom: Animalia
- Phylum: Chordata
- Class: Actinopterygii
- Order: Cypriniformes
- Family: Cyprinidae
- Subfamily: Smiliogastrinae
- Genus: Enteromius
- Species: E. lukusiensis

Binomial name
- Enteromius lukusiensis (L. R. David & Poll, 1937)

Synonyms
- Barbus lukusiensis David & Poll, 1937

Species of fish

Enteromius lukusiensis is a species of cyprinid fish in the genus Enteromius from the Democratic Republic of the Congo.
