= Enteromius tegulifer =

Scientific classification
- Domain: Eukaryota
- Kingdom: Animalia
- Phylum: Chordata
- Class: Actinopterygii
- Order: Cypriniformes
- Family: Cyprinidae
- Genus: Enteromius
- Species: E. tegulifer

Binomial name
- Enteromius tegulifer (Fowler, 1936)

Synonyms
- Barbus tegulifer

Species of fish

Enteromius tegulifer is a species of ray-finned fish in the genus Enteromius which is endemic to Cameroon.
