= Inconspicuous barb =

Conservation status
- Least Concern (IUCN 3.1)

Scientific classification
- Kingdom: Animalia
- Phylum: Chordata
- Class: Actinopterygii
- Order: Cypriniformes
- Family: Cyprinidae
- Subfamily: Smiliogastrinae
- Genus: Enteromius
- Species: E. innocens

Binomial name
- Enteromius innocens (Pfeffer, 1896)

Synonyms
- Barbus innocens Pfeffer

Species of fish

The inconspicuous barb (Enteromius innocens), sometimes misspelled inconspicious barb, is a species of cyprinid fish. It is found in Burundi, Kenya, Malawi, and Tanzania. Its natural habitats are rivers, freshwater lakes, freshwater marshes, and inland deltas. It is not considered a threatened species by the IUCN.
