= Enteromius inaequalis =

Conservation status
- Least Concern (IUCN 3.1)

Scientific classification
- Kingdom: Animalia
- Phylum: Chordata
- Class: Actinopterygii
- Order: Cypriniformes
- Family: Cyprinidae
- Genus: Enteromius
- Species: E. inaequalis

Binomial name
- Enteromius inaequalis (Lévêque, Teugels & Thys van den Audenaerde, 1988)

Synonyms
- Barbus inaequalis Lévêque, Teugels & Thys van den Audenaerde, 1988

Species of fish

Enteromius inaequalis is a species of ray-finned fish in the genus Enteromius.
