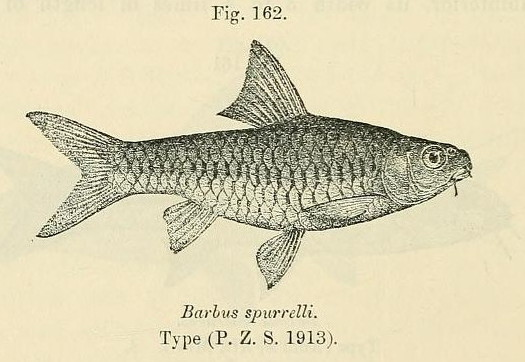

Conservation status
- Least Concern (IUCN 3.1)

Scientific classification
- Kingdom: Animalia
- Phylum: Chordata
- Class: Actinopterygii
- Order: Cypriniformes
- Family: Cyprinidae
- Genus: Enteromius
- Species: E. ablabes

Binomial name
- Enteromius ablabes (Bleeker, 1863)

Synonyms
- Puntius ablabes Bleeker, 1863; Barbus ablabes (Bleeker, 1863); Barbus spurrelli Boulenger, 1913

= Enteromius ablabes =

Species of fish

Enteromius ablabes is a species of ray-finned fish in the genus Enteromius. It occurs in West Africa from the Sahel to the coast between Guinea and Nigeria, south to the central Congo Basin. The relationship of E. ablabes to other Enteromius is uncertain. Tsigenopoulos et al. (2002) found it to be sister to E. macrops. Yang et al. (2015) using the same sequence found it to be sister to E. anema, and Hayes et al. (2017) found the Tsigenopoulos et al. specimen to be sister to E. anema + E. cf. guildi and newly sequenced specimens from Guinea to be sister to be in a clade with a specimen of E. punctitaeniatus and that clade sister to E. bigornei and E. foutensis. The Tsigenopoulos et al. specimen is from Ivory Coast, but a catalog number is not provided to check identity. Enteromius punctitaeniatus is a species very similar in appearance to E. ablabes, differing by having 9 circumpeduncular scales vs. 12. Enteromius ablabes is likely polymorphic with one species already described from within it (E. parablabes) (Lévêque et al. 1990). This description conforms to the current hypothesis on the identity of E. ablabes; however, the species will need to be examined in greater detail to determine if there are multiple species present.

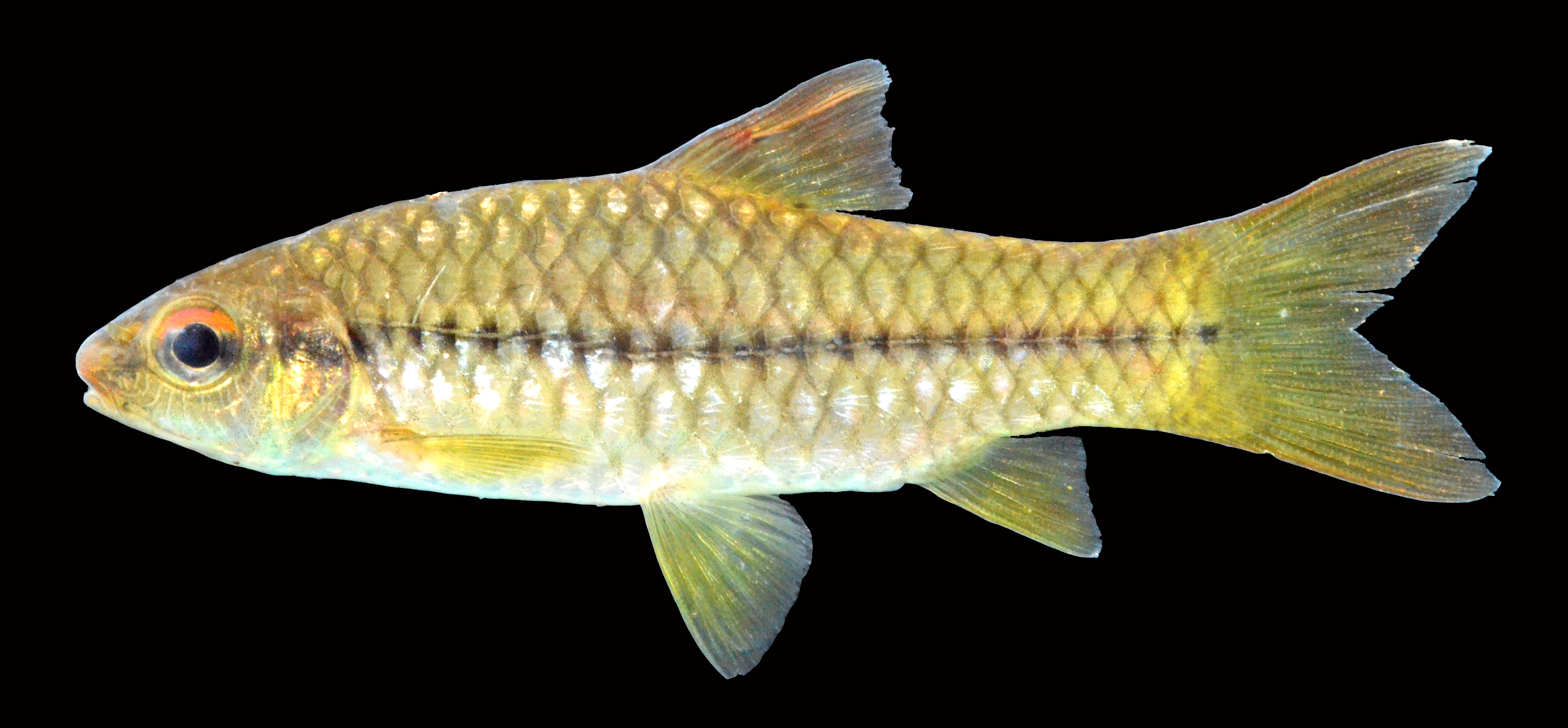
Enteromius ablabes, AUM 59696, Kindia, Guinea, Kalikouré River, on N24 near Bangouya, 10.35024°, -12.95466, Photo by J.W. Armbruster.

== Species description ==
=== Synonymy ===
Puntius (Barbodes) ablabes, Bleeker 1863.

Barbus spurrellii Boulenger 1913.

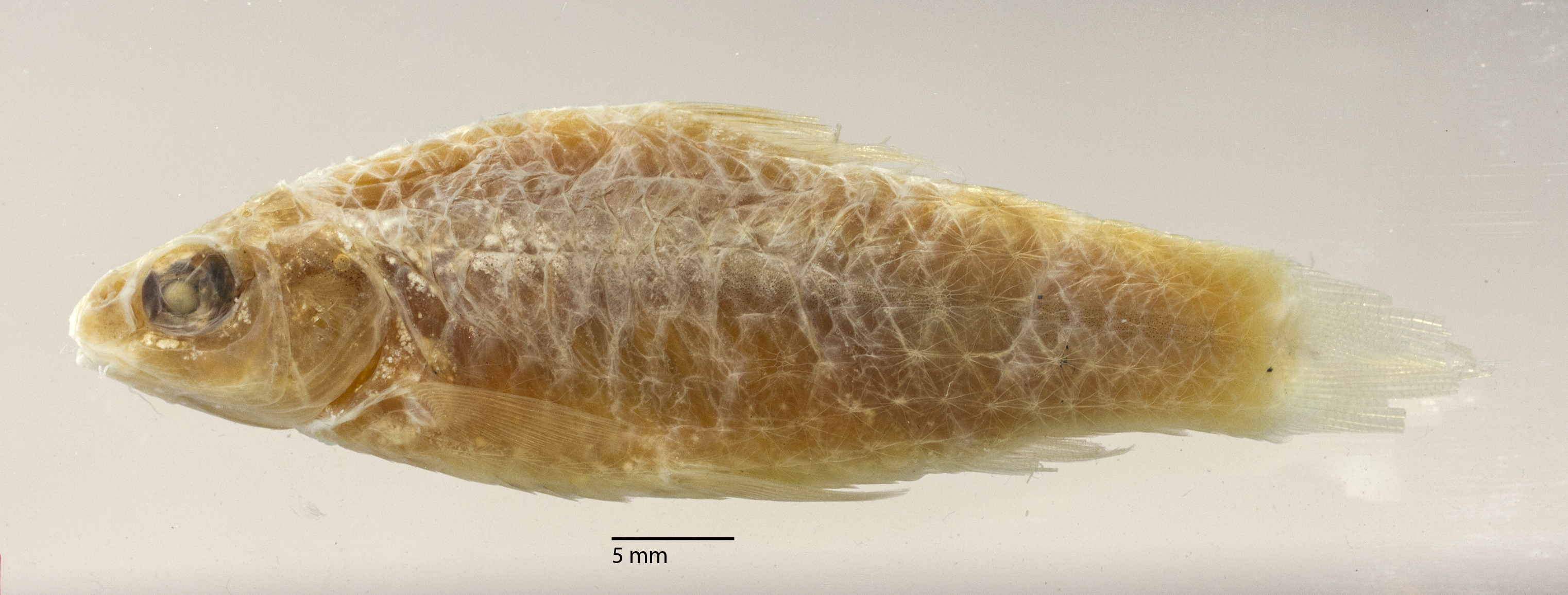
Syntype of Puntius (Barbodes) ablabes, RMNH 2466, 47.3 mm SL, from the All Cypriniformes Species Inventory.

=== Syntypes ===
RMNH 2466 (2), Dabo Crom, Guinea [per Trewavas 1974), the translation is Krom Town, which is a small town just to the west of Accra, Ghana].

=== Diagnosis ===
Per Lévêque et al. (1990)^{[6]} and de Weirdt et al. (2007), Enteromius ablabes can be separated from potentially sympatric species in the following manner. Enteromius ablabes can be separated from E. carchahinoides, E. cadenati, E. dialonensis, E. diamouanganai, E. guineensis, E. guirali, E. holotaenia, E. martorelli, E. nounensis, and E. prionacanthus by having the last simple ray of the dorsal flexible (vs. forming a spine) and from all of those except E. nounensis by lacking serrae on the posterior margin of the last simple ray (vs. present). It can be separated from E. aloyi, E. anema, E. aspilus, E. bourdariei, E. brazzai, E. carens, E. clauseni, E. collarti, E. condei, E. jae, E. leonensis, E. nigroluteus, E. nounensis, E. parajae, E. pobeguini, E. pumilus, E. salessei, E. stigmatopygus, E. sylvaticus, and E. trispilomimus by having two well-developed barbels (vs barbels absent or a single pair of small barbels). It can be separated from E. guildi, E. leonensis, E. niokoloensis, E. punctitaeniatus, E. salessei, E. stigmatopygus, E. trispliomimus, and E. zalbiensis by having 11-12 circumpeduncular scales (vs. 8–10). It can be separated from E. rouxi by having 22-27 lateral line scales (vs. 34–37). It can be separated from E. bagbwensis, E. brichardi, E. callipterus, E. foutensis, E. guirali, and E. raimbaulti by having a dark longitudinal stripe (vs. stripe absent). It can be separated from E. aliciae, E. anniae, E. baudoni, E. boboi, E. camptacanthus, E. catenarius, E. eburniensis, E. kuiluensis, E. lauzannei, E. liberoides, E. huguenyi, E. perince, E. macinensis, E. sublineatus, E. taeniurus, E. tegulifer, E. tiekoroi, E. thysi, E. traorei, E. trispiloides, E. trispilos, and E. walkeri by having a longitudinal dark stripe and no round spots (vs. round spots present). It can be separated from E. nigeriensis by having a straight, wide, longitudinal stripe (vs narrow stripe upturned beneath dorsal fin). It can be separated from E. aloyi, E. atakorensis, E. bigornei, E. carens, E. ditenensis, E. chlorotaenia, E. inaequalis, E. nigeriensis, E. nigroluteus, E. niokoloensis, E. rubrostigma, E. subinensis, E. stauchi, and E. zalbiensis by having 4 scales above the lateral line (vs 5–6). It can be separated from E. bawkuensis, E. clauseni, E. collarti, E. condei, E. jae, E. leonensis, E. nounensis, E. parajae, E. salessei, E. stigmatopygus, and E. sylvaticus by having a complete lateral line (vs. incomplete or absent). It can be separated from E. melanotaenia by having a narrow longitudinal band that is less than one scale wide (vs. very broad band that is greater than one scale wide at least anteriorly). Separation of E. ablabes from E. parablabes is difficult, but the dorsal fin is shorter and straighter in E. paralabes and the head is more rounded; E. paralabes is only known form the type locality on the Atakora massif in Benin while E. ablabes is broadly distributed. It can be separated from E. aboinensis, E. brazzai, E. brichardi, E. callipterus, E. macrops, E. nigroluteus by having no dark spot in the dorsal fin (vs. dark spot or blotch present along the dorsal edge of fin, along the anterior rays, or at base of anterior rays). It can be separated from species of Clypeobarbus by having 4 scales above the lateral line (vs. 2).

=== Description ===
Body moderately deep. Body contour rising convexly from tip of snout to origin of dorsal fin, lowering as straight line to proximal caudal-fin rays, then rising to caudal fin. Ventral profile moderately convex from lower jaw to origin of anal fin then convex to caudal fin. Caudal peduncle deep. Snout rounded, mouth subterminal. Body wide, width greatest approximately at middle of dorsal fin. Dorsal surface in front of dorsal fin forming a smooth curve and from dorsal fin to caudal fin flat. Ventral surface largely flat to pelvic fins and then forming rounded curve.

Eye large, ovoid with anterior slightly narrower than posterior. Pit lines well developed below eye (extending as lines below infraorbital canal as well as some areas between lines) and on posteroventral side of preopercle, present as slight lines elsewhere on head. Lateral line complete, extending one or two scales beyond end of caudal peduncle. Two barbels present; anterior barbel short, extending just beyond base of posterior; posterior barbel longer, extending to anteriormost exposed branchiostegal. Lips fleshy. Fill membranes free from isthmus.

Scales large with few, divergent striae. Abdominal scales large, covering entire venter in three rows across most of abdomen. Scales just slightly covering base of caudal fin. Vent situated just anterior to anal fin. 22–27 lateral line scales, 4 scales above lateral line, 4 scales below lateral line, 18 circumferential scales, 12 circumpeduncular scales.

Dorsal fin triangular, last unbranched ray longest, not thickened, lacking serrae; iii,8. Pectoral fin roughly triangular with rounded posterior edge; extending to approximately two scales anterior to anal fin. Pelvic fin roughly triangular with rounded posterior edge; extending to approximately two scales anterior to vent. Anal fin quadrangular with almost straight posterior edge; extending to approximately 3–5 scales from procurrent rays; iii,5. Caudal fin forked with tips slightly rounded.

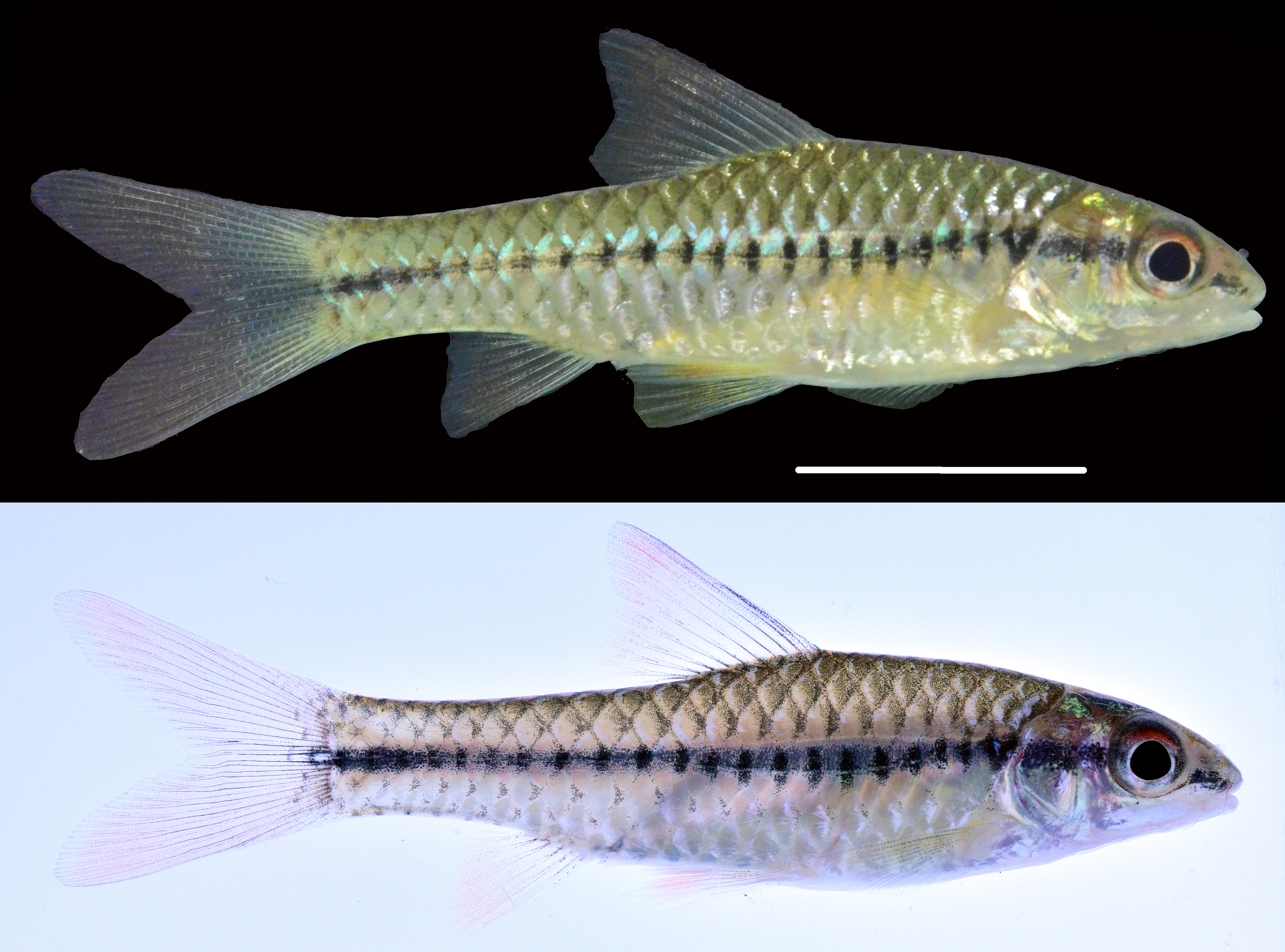
Aquarium specimen of Enteromius ablabes from unknown locality taken against dark and light backgrounds. Scale bar = 1 cm. Photo by J.W. Armbruster.

=== Color in life ===
Body straw-colored to yellow above fading to white on venter; sometimes with fluorescent turquoise marks above lateral line down whole body and below lateral line on caudal peduncle, on the dorsal posterodorsal portion of head, and ventral portion of head behind jaws. Fins may be colored as sides or hyaline. Dark stripe extending from tip of snout to end of caudal peduncle (may be lighter on head and darkest on caudal peduncle); dark stripe overlain by darker vertical dashes between scales, elongate dark spot occasionally present on base of caudal fin contiguous with lateral stripe. Remainder of scales outlined with dark pigment, sometimes with broader, darker areas where scales in scale rows meet (coloring less intense below lateral line). Scattered, dark chromatophores often present on scales, particularly anterodorsally. Dorsal rim of eye burnt orange to red.

=== Color in alcohol ===
Color similar to life except base color cream-yellow and darkly pigmented areas more intense (particularly above lateral stripe (light area present between lateral stripe and shaded dorsal coloration. Turquoise and red colors absent.

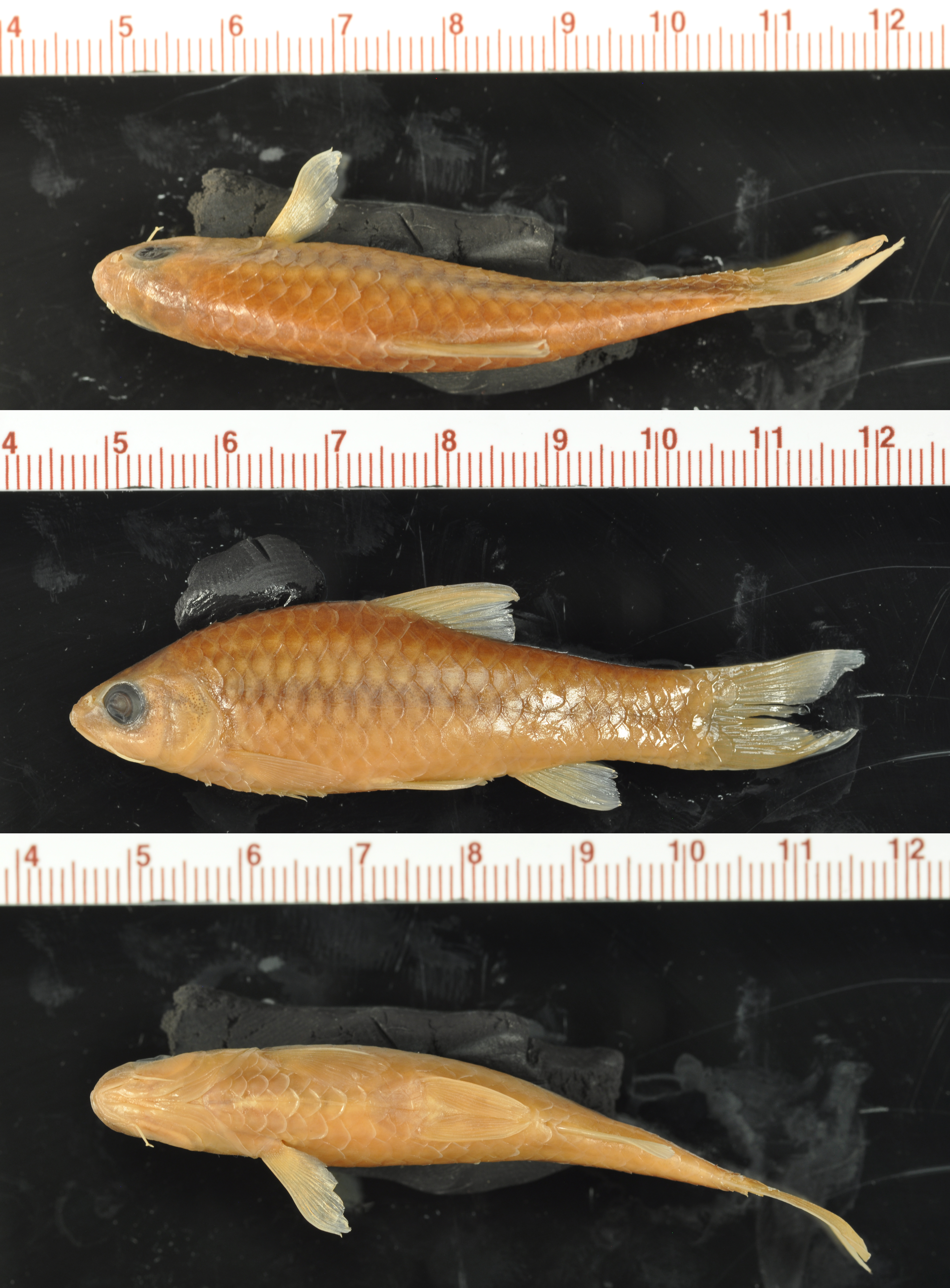
Preserved specimen of Enteromius ablabes in dorsal, lateral, and ventral views. USNM 270950, specimen #1, 56.2 mm SL, Tove, Togo.

=== Distribution ===
Enteromius ablabes is present in Atlantic Coast and Gulf of Guinea basins from the Senegal (Mali) and Kaikoure (Guinea) rivers in the east to the Sanaga River (Cameroon) in the west. Additional localities are present in the upper Lake Chad (Central African Republic) and upper Congo River (Central African Republic, Democratic Republic of Congo) basins. Based on distribution records in GBIF^{[9]}.

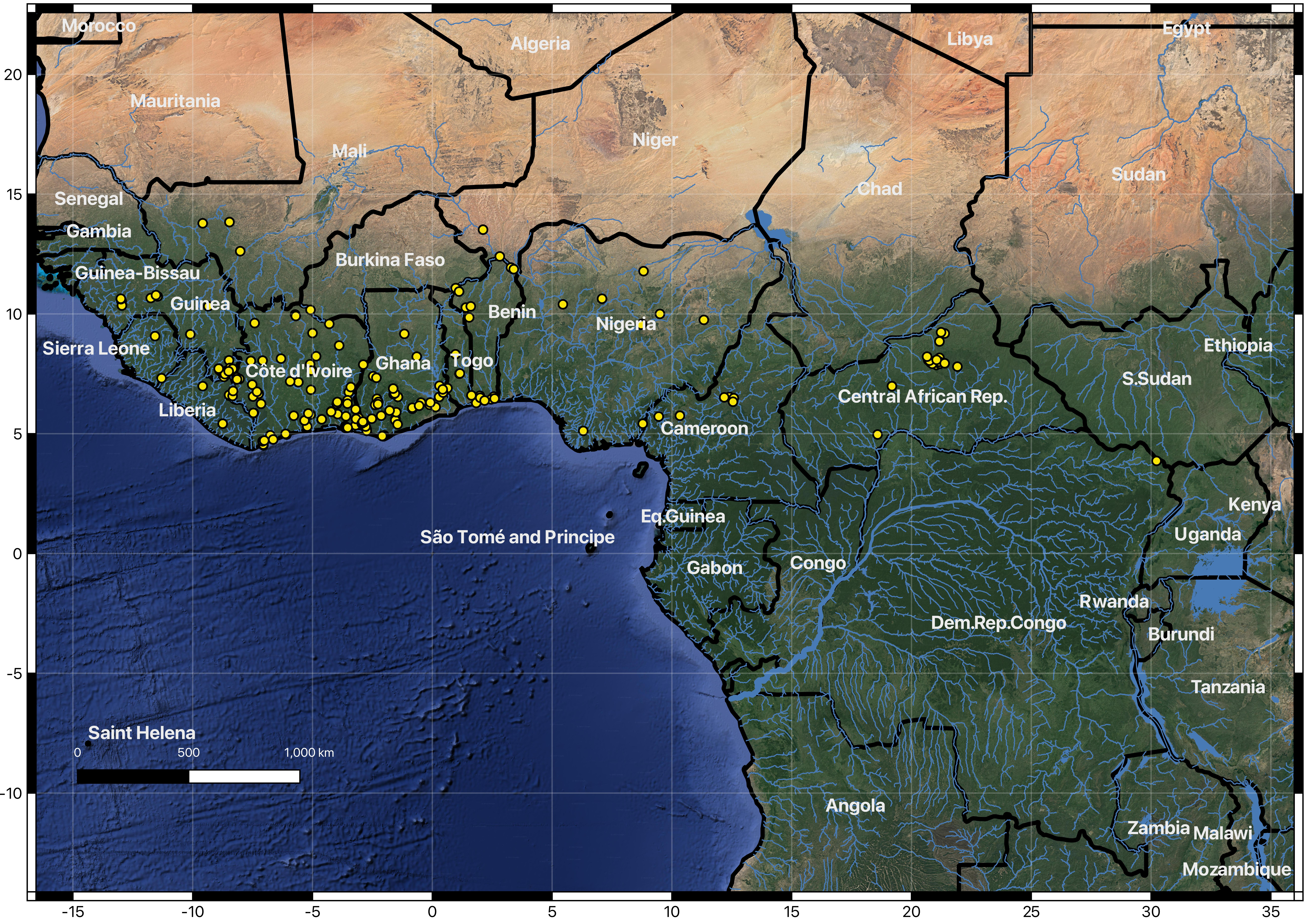
Distribution of Enteromius ablabes based on data from GBIF. Map by J.W. Armbruster.

=== Etymology ===
Per the Etyfish Project (https://etyfish.org/cypriniformes9/) from the Greek αβλαβής meaning harmless, in reference to the flexible, unserrated dorsal-fin spine.
