= Bunjako barb =

Conservation status
- Least Concern (IUCN 3.1)

Scientific classification
- Kingdom: Animalia
- Phylum: Chordata
- Class: Actinopterygii
- Order: Cypriniformes
- Family: Cyprinidae
- Subfamily: Smiliogastrinae
- Genus: Enteromius
- Species: E. magdalenae

Binomial name
- Enteromius magdalenae (Boulenger, 1906)

Synonyms
- Barbus magdalenae Boulenger, 1906

Species of fish

The Bunjako barb (Enteromius magdalenae) is a species of cyprinid fish.

It is found only in Kenya. Its natural habitats are rivers, swamps, and freshwater lakes. It is not considered a threatened species by the IUCN.
