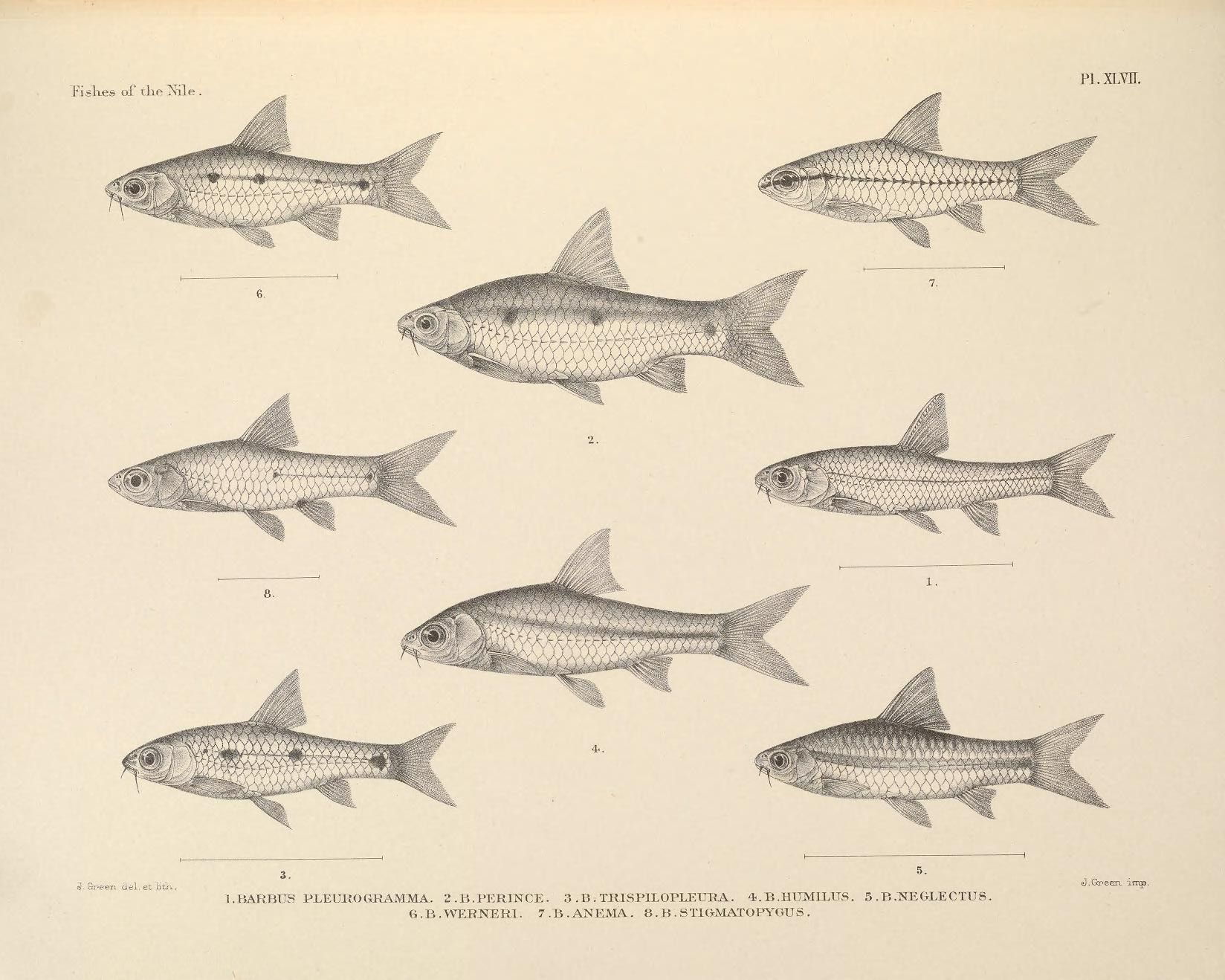
- Enteromius anema in upper right corner

Conservation status
- Least Concern (IUCN 3.1)

Scientific classification
- Kingdom: Animalia
- Phylum: Chordata
- Class: Actinopterygii
- Order: Cypriniformes
- Family: Cyprinidae
- Subfamily: Smiliogastrinae
- Genus: Enteromius
- Species: E. anema

Binomial name
- Enteromius anema (Boulenger, 1903)

Synonyms
- Barbus anema Boulenger, 1903

= Enteromius anema =

Species of fish

Enteromius anema is a species of ray-finned fish in the genus Enteromius.

It is widespread in Africa, being found in Cameroon, Central African Republic, Chad, Egypt, Ethiopia, Guinea, Mali, Nigeria, South Sudan and Sudan. It grows to a length of about 5 cm.
