= Enteromius arambourgi =

Scientific classification
- Domain: Eukaryota
- Kingdom: Animalia
- Phylum: Chordata
- Class: Actinopterygii
- Order: Cypriniformes
- Family: Cyprinidae
- Subfamily: Smiliogastrinae
- Genus: Enteromius
- Species: E. arambourgi

Binomial name
- Enteromius arambourgi Pellegrin, 1935

Synonyms
- Barbus arambourgi Pellegrin, 1935; Labeobarbus arambourgi (Pellegrin, 1935)

Species of fish

Enteromius arambourgi is a species of ray-finned fish in the genus Enteromius. It is endemic to Ethiopia.

== Size ==
This species reaches a length of 6.2 cm (2.4 in).

== Etymology ==
The fish is named in honor of vertebrate paleontologist Camille Arambourg (1885–1970), who conducted field work in North Africa including Ethiopia, where this barb is endemic.
