= Enteromius guineensis =

Conservation status
- Vulnerable (IUCN 3.1)

Scientific classification
- Domain: Eukaryota
- Kingdom: Animalia
- Phylum: Chordata
- Class: Actinopterygii
- Order: Cypriniformes
- Family: Cyprinidae
- Genus: Enteromius
- Species: E. guineensis

Binomial name
- Enteromius guineensis (Pellegrin, 1913)

Synonyms
- Barbus guineensis Pellegrin, 1913

Species of fish

Enteromius guineensis is a species of ray-finned fish in the genus Enteromius. It is restricted to the Upper Konkouré River system in the Fouta Djalon highlands in Guinea.
