= Enteromius punctitaeniatus =

Conservation status
- Least Concern (IUCN 3.1)

Scientific classification
- Domain: Eukaryota
- Kingdom: Animalia
- Phylum: Chordata
- Class: Actinopterygii
- Order: Cypriniformes
- Family: Cyprinidae
- Subfamily: Smiliogastrinae
- Genus: Enteromius
- Species: E. punctitaeniatus

Binomial name
- Enteromius punctitaeniatus (Daget, 1954)

Synonyms
- Barbus punctitaeniatus

Species of fish

Enteromius punctitaeniatus is a species of ray-finned fish in the genus Enteromius, which is widespread in West Africa from Senegal to Nigeria.
