= Enteromius aloyi =

Conservation status
- Data Deficient (IUCN 3.1)

Scientific classification
- Kingdom: Animalia
- Phylum: Chordata
- Class: Actinopterygii
- Order: Cypriniformes
- Family: Cyprinidae
- Subfamily: Smiliogastrinae
- Genus: Enteromius
- Species: E. aloyi

Binomial name
- Enteromius aloyi Román, 1971

Synonyms
- Barbus aloyi Román 1971

Species of fish

Enteromius aloyi is a species of ray-finned fish in the genus Enteromius. It is known only from its type locality on the Ntem River, Equatorial Guinea.

The fish is named in honor of Isidro Aloy (b. 1925) a Spanish biologist, who taught mathematics as a missionary.
