= Enteromius trispiloides =

Conservation status
- Data Deficient (IUCN 3.1)

Scientific classification
- Kingdom: Animalia
- Phylum: Chordata
- Class: Actinopterygii
- Order: Cypriniformes
- Family: Cyprinidae
- Subfamily: Smiliogastrinae
- Genus: Enteromius
- Species: E. trispiloides

Binomial name
- Enteromius trispiloides Lévêque, Teugels & Thys van den Audenaerde, 1987

Synonyms
- Barbus trispiloides

Species of fish

Enteromius trispiloides is a species of ray-finned fish in the genus Enteromius which is endemic toonly known from a single specimen collected in the River Mano in Liberia.

== Footnotes ==
- Froese, Rainer; Pauly, Daniel (eds.). "Enteromius trispiloides". FishBase.
