= Enteromius pygmaeus =

Conservation status
- Data Deficient (IUCN 3.1)

Scientific classification
- Kingdom: Animalia
- Phylum: Chordata
- Class: Actinopterygii
- Order: Cypriniformes
- Family: Cyprinidae
- Subfamily: Smiliogastrinae
- Genus: Enteromius
- Species: E. pygmaeus

Binomial name
- Enteromius pygmaeus (Poll & J. P. Gosse, 1963)

Synonyms
- Barbus pygmaeus

Species of fish

Enteromius pygmaeus is a species of ray-finned fish in the genus Enteromius which is endemic to the central Congo Basin in the Democratic Republic of the Congo.
