= Enteromius zalbiensis =

Conservation status
- Least Concern (IUCN 3.1)

Scientific classification
- Kingdom: Animalia
- Phylum: Chordata
- Class: Actinopterygii
- Order: Cypriniformes
- Family: Cyprinidae
- Subfamily: Smiliogastrinae
- Genus: Enteromius
- Species: E. zalbiensis

Binomial name
- Enteromius zalbiensis (Blache & Miton, 1960)

Synonyms
- Barbus zalbiensis Blache & Miton, 1960

Species of fish

Enteromius zalbiensis is a species of ray-finned fish in the genus Enteromius.
