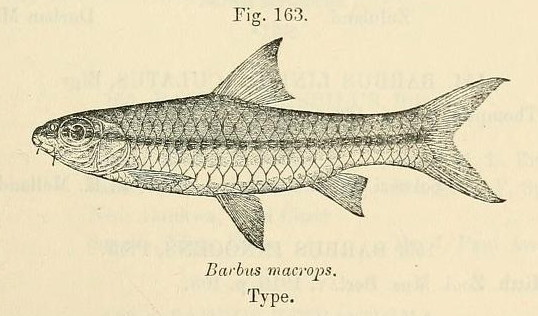

Conservation status
- Least Concern (IUCN 3.1)

Scientific classification
- Domain: Eukaryota
- Kingdom: Animalia
- Phylum: Chordata
- Class: Actinopterygii
- Order: Cypriniformes
- Family: Cyprinidae
- Subfamily: Smiliogastrinae
- Genus: Enteromius
- Species: E. macrops

Binomial name
- Enteromius macrops (Boulenger, 1911)

Synonyms
- Barbus macrops Boulenger, 1911

= Blackstripe barb =

Species of fish

The blackstripe barb (Enteromius macrops) is a species of cyprinid fish in the genus Enteromius which is widely distributed in West Africa where it is harvested for human consumption.
