= Enteromius aspilus =

Conservation status
- Least Concern (IUCN 3.1)

Scientific classification
- Domain: Eukaryota
- Kingdom: Animalia
- Phylum: Chordata
- Class: Actinopterygii
- Order: Cypriniformes
- Family: Cyprinidae
- Genus: Enteromius
- Species: E. aspilus

Binomial name
- Enteromius aspilus Boulenger, 1907

Synonyms
- Barbus aspilus Boulenger, 1907

Species of fish

Enteromius aspilus is a species of ray-finned fish in the genus Enteromius.

== Footnotes ==
- Froese, Rainer; Pauly, Daniel (eds.). "Enteromius aspilus". FishBase.
