= Enteromius caudosignatus =

Conservation status
- Data Deficient (IUCN 3.1)

Scientific classification
- Domain: Eukaryota
- Kingdom: Animalia
- Phylum: Chordata
- Class: Actinopterygii
- Order: Cypriniformes
- Family: Cyprinidae
- Subfamily: Smiliogastrinae
- Genus: Enteromius
- Species: E. caudosignatus

Binomial name
- Enteromius caudosignatus Poll, 1967

Synonyms
- Barbus caudosignatus Poll, 1967

Species of fish

Enteromius caudosignatus is a species of ray-finned fish in the genus Enteromius, it occurs at only one known location in the Congo Basin of Angola.
