= Enteromius huguenyi =

Conservation status
- Vulnerable (IUCN 3.1)

Scientific classification
- Domain: Eukaryota
- Kingdom: Animalia
- Phylum: Chordata
- Class: Actinopterygii
- Order: Cypriniformes
- Family: Cyprinidae
- Subfamily: Smiliogastrinae
- Genus: Enteromius
- Species: E. huguenyi

Binomial name
- Enteromius huguenyi (Bigorne & Lévêque, 1993)

Synonyms
- Barbus huguenyi Bigorne & Lévêque, 1993

Species of fish

Enteromius huguenyi is a species of ray-finned fish in the genus Enteromius.

It lives in freshwater in Guinea and Liberia.

== Size ==
This species reaches a length of 5.3 cm (2.1 in).

== Etymology ==
The fish is named in honor of Bernard Hugueny, ecologist and limnologist, at the IRD (Institut de Recherche pour le Développement, Paris).
