= Enteromius sylvaticus =

Conservation status
- Vulnerable (IUCN 3.1)

Scientific classification
- Kingdom: Animalia
- Phylum: Chordata
- Class: Actinopterygii
- Order: Cypriniformes
- Family: Cyprinidae
- Subfamily: Smiliogastrinae
- Genus: Enteromius
- Species: E. sylvaticus

Binomial name
- Enteromius sylvaticus (Loiselle & Welcomme, 1971)

Synonyms
- Barbus sylvaticus

Species of fish

Enteromius sylvaticus is a species of ray-finned fish in the genus Enteromius which is found in Benin and in the lower Niger Delta in Nigeria.

== Footnotes ==
- Froese, Rainer; Pauly, Daniel (eds.). "Enteromius sylvaticus". FishBase.
