= Enteromius syntrechalepis =

Conservation status
- Data Deficient (IUCN 3.1)

Scientific classification
- Domain: Eukaryota
- Kingdom: Animalia
- Phylum: Chordata
- Class: Actinopterygii
- Order: Cypriniformes
- Family: Cyprinidae
- Subfamily: Smiliogastrinae
- Genus: Enteromius
- Species: E. syntrechalepis

Binomial name
- Enteromius syntrechalepis (Fowler, 1949)

Synonyms
- Barbus syntrechalepis

Species of fish

Enteromius syntrechalepis is a species of ray-finned fish in the genus Enteromius which has only been recorded from the central Congo Basin in the Democratic Republic of the Congo.

== Footnotes ==
- Froese, Rainer; Pauly, Daniel (eds.). "Enteromius syntrechalepis". FishBase.
