= Enteromius ditinensis =

Conservation status
- Least Concern (IUCN 3.1)

Scientific classification
- Domain: Eukaryota
- Kingdom: Animalia
- Phylum: Chordata
- Class: Actinopterygii
- Order: Cypriniformes
- Family: Cyprinidae
- Subfamily: Smiliogastrinae
- Genus: Enteromius
- Species: E. ditinensis

Binomial name
- Enteromius ditinensis Daget, 1962

Synonyms
- Barbus ditinensis Daget, 1962

Species of fish

Enteromius ditinensis is a species of ray-finned fish in the genus Enteromius, which is found in the upper basin of the Senegal River in Guinea.
