= Enteromius stigmasemion =

Scientific classification
- Domain: Eukaryota
- Kingdom: Animalia
- Phylum: Chordata
- Class: Actinopterygii
- Order: Cypriniformes
- Family: Cyprinidae
- Subfamily: Smiliogastrinae
- Genus: Enteromius
- Species: E. stigmasemion

Binomial name
- Enteromius stigmasemion (Fowler, 1936)

Synonyms
- Barbus stigmasemion

Species of fish

Enteromius stigmasemion is a species of ray-finned fish in the genus Enteromius.

== Footnotes ==
- Froese, Rainer; Pauly, Daniel (eds.). "Enteromius stigmasemion". FishBase.
