= Four-spotted barb =

Conservation status
- Data Deficient (IUCN 3.1)

Scientific classification
- Kingdom: Animalia
- Phylum: Chordata
- Class: Actinopterygii
- Order: Cypriniformes
- Family: Cyprinidae
- Subfamily: Smiliogastrinae
- Genus: Enteromius
- Species: E. quadripunctatus

Binomial name
- Enteromius quadripunctatus (Pfeffer, 1896)

Synonyms
- Barbus quadripunctatus

Species of fish

The four-spotted barb (Enteromius quadripunctatus) is a species of ray-finned fish in the family Cyprinidae.

It is found in Pangani River drainage in Kenya and Tanzania. Its natural habitat is rivers. Its status is insufficiently known.
