= Line-spotted barb =

Conservation status
- Least Concern (IUCN 3.1)

Scientific classification
- Kingdom: Animalia
- Phylum: Chordata
- Class: Actinopterygii
- Order: Cypriniformes
- Family: Cyprinidae
- Subfamily: Smiliogastrinae
- Genus: Enteromius
- Species: E. lineomaculatus

Binomial name
- Enteromius lineomaculatus (Boulenger, 1903)

Synonyms
- Barbus lineomaculatus Boulenger, 1903

Species of fish

The line-spotted barb (Enteromius lineomaculatus) is a species of cyprinid fish.

It is found in Burundi, Kenya, Rwanda, Tanzania, Uganda, Zambia, and Zimbabwe. Its natural habitats are rivers, intermittent rivers, and inland deltas. It is not considered a threatened species by the IUCN.
