= Enteromius tomiensis =

Conservation status
- Data Deficient (IUCN 3.1)

Scientific classification
- Kingdom: Animalia
- Phylum: Chordata
- Class: Actinopterygii
- Order: Cypriniformes
- Family: Cyprinidae
- Subfamily: Smiliogastrinae
- Genus: Enteromius
- Species: E. tomiensis

Binomial name
- Enteromius tomiensis (Fowler, 1936)

Synonyms
- Barbus tomiensis

Species of fish

Enteromius tomiensis is a species of ray-finned fish in the genus Enteromius. This species is endemic to the Central African Republic.
