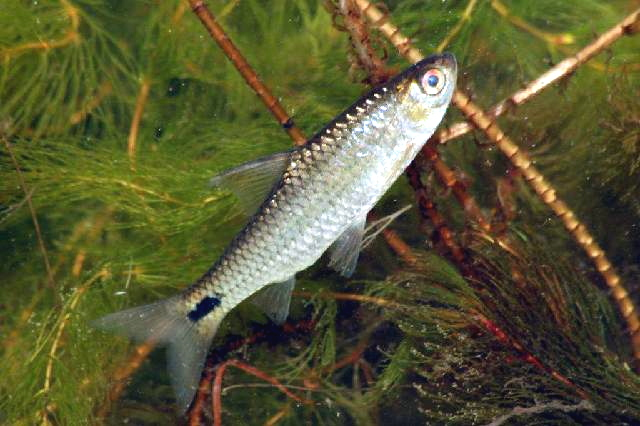

Conservation status
- Least Concern (IUCN 3.1)

Scientific classification
- Domain: Eukaryota
- Kingdom: Animalia
- Phylum: Chordata
- Class: Actinopterygii
- Order: Cypriniformes
- Family: Cyprinidae
- Genus: Enteromius
- Species: E. poechii

Binomial name
- Enteromius poechii (Steindachner, 1911)

Synonyms
- Barbus poechii Steindachner, 1911; Barbus bernardcarpi Jubb, 1958; Barbus bernardcarpi Jubb, 1958

= Dashtail barb =

Species of fish

The dashtail barb (Enteromius poechii) is a species of cyprinid fish in the genus Enteromius which is found in the rivers of western central Africa from Zimbabwe and Namibia north to the Democratic Republic of the Congo.
