= Red Pangani barb =

Conservation status
- Data Deficient (IUCN 3.1)

Scientific classification
- Kingdom: Animalia
- Phylum: Chordata
- Class: Actinopterygii
- Order: Cypriniformes
- Family: Cyprinidae
- Subfamily: Smiliogastrinae
- Genus: Enteromius
- Species: E. venustus

Binomial name
- Enteromius venustus (R. G. Bailey, 1980)

Synonyms
- Barbus venustus

Species of fish

The red Pangani barb (Enteromius venustus) is a species of cyprinid fish.

It is found in Kenya and Tanzania. Its natural habitats are rivers and freshwater lakes. Its status is insufficiently known.
