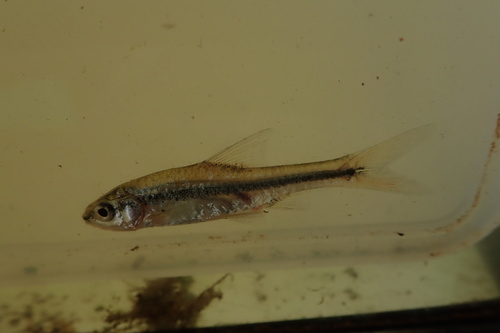

Conservation status
- Least Concern (IUCN 3.1)

Scientific classification
- Kingdom: Animalia
- Phylum: Chordata
- Class: Actinopterygii
- Order: Cypriniformes
- Family: Cyprinidae
- Subfamily: Smiliogastrinae
- Genus: Enteromius
- Species: E. toppini

Binomial name
- Enteromius toppini Boulenger, 1916

Synonyms
- Barbus umbeluziensis Groenewald, 1958; Barbus toppini Boulenger, 1916

= East coast barb =

Species of fish

The east coast barb (Enteromius toppini) is a species of cyprinid fish.

It is found in Kenya, Malawi, Tanzania, and Zimbabwe. Its natural habitat is rivers. It is not considered a threatened species by the IUCN.
