= Enteromius martorelli =

Conservation status
- Least Concern (IUCN 3.1)

Scientific classification
- Domain: Eukaryota
- Kingdom: Animalia
- Phylum: Chordata
- Class: Actinopterygii
- Order: Cypriniformes
- Family: Cyprinidae
- Subfamily: Smiliogastrinae
- Genus: Enteromius
- Species: E. martorelli

Binomial name
- Enteromius martorelli (Román, 1971)

Synonyms
- Barbus martorelli Román, 1971

Species of fish

Enteromius martorelli is a species of ray-finned fish in the genus Enteromius.
