= Enteromius aboinensis =

Conservation status
- Least Concern (IUCN 3.1)

Scientific classification
- Kingdom: Animalia
- Phylum: Chordata
- Class: Actinopterygii
- Order: Cypriniformes
- Family: Cyprinidae
- Genus: Enteromius
- Species: E. aboinensis

Binomial name
- Enteromius aboinensis Boulenger, 1911

Synonyms
- Barbus aboinensis Boulenger, 1911

Species of fish

Enteromius aboinensis is a species of ray-finned fish in the genus Enteromius. It was described from the Amboina River in Niger, and has been reported from the Benue River.
