= Enteromius lufukiensis =

Conservation status
- Near Threatened (IUCN 3.1)

Scientific classification
- Kingdom: Animalia
- Phylum: Chordata
- Class: Actinopterygii
- Order: Cypriniformes
- Family: Cyprinidae
- Subfamily: Smiliogastrinae
- Genus: Enteromius
- Species: E. lufukiensis

Binomial name
- Enteromius lufukiensis (Boulenger, 1917)

Synonyms
- Barbus lufukiensisBoulenger, 1917

Species of fish

Enteromius lufukiensis is a species of ray-finned fish in the family Cyprinidae. It is found in Burundi and Democratic Republic of the Congo. Its natural habitat is rivers but it is becoming rare due to habitat loss.
