= Enteromius kuiluensis =

Conservation status
- Data Deficient (IUCN 3.1)

Scientific classification
- Domain: Eukaryota
- Kingdom: Animalia
- Phylum: Chordata
- Class: Actinopterygii
- Order: Cypriniformes
- Family: Cyprinidae
- Genus: Enteromius
- Species: E. kuiluensis

Binomial name
- Enteromius kuiluensis (Pellegrin, 1930)

Synonyms
- Barbus kuiluensis Pellegrin, 1930

Species of fish

Enteromius kuiluensis is a species of ray-finned fish in the genus Enteromius. It is a freshwater fish that is found in Africa. Enteromius kuiluensis has been found only in the Niari-Kouilou basin in the Republic of Congo.
