= Enteromius mohasicus =

Scientific classification
- Domain: Eukaryota
- Kingdom: Animalia
- Phylum: Chordata
- Class: Actinopterygii
- Order: Cypriniformes
- Family: Cyprinidae
- Genus: Enteromius
- Species: E. mohasicus

Binomial name
- Enteromius mohasicus Pappenheim, 1914

Synonyms
- Barbus mohasicus Pappenheim, 1914

Species of fish

Enteromius mohasicus is a species of ray-finned fish in the genus Enteromius which occurs in Lake Muhazi and Lake Kivu in central Africa.
