= Enteromius laticeps =

Conservation status
- Vulnerable (IUCN 3.1)

Scientific classification
- Kingdom: Animalia
- Phylum: Chordata
- Class: Actinopterygii
- Order: Cypriniformes
- Family: Cyprinidae
- Subfamily: Smiliogastrinae
- Genus: Enteromius
- Species: E. laticeps

Binomial name
- Enteromius laticeps (Pfeffer, 1889)

Synonyms
- Barbus laticeps Pfeffer, 1889

Species of fish

Barbus laticeps is a species of ray-finned fish in the family Cyprinidae. It is found only in Tanzania. Its natural habitat is rivers.
