= Dash-dot barb =

Conservation status
- Least Concern (IUCN 3.1)

Scientific classification
- Kingdom: Animalia
- Phylum: Chordata
- Class: Actinopterygii
- Order: Cypriniformes
- Family: Cyprinidae
- Subfamily: Smiliogastrinae
- Genus: Enteromius
- Species: E. atkinsoni

Binomial name
- Enteromius atkinsoni (R. G. Bailey, 1969)

Synonyms
- Barbus atkinsoni Bailey, 1969

Species of fish

The dash-dot barb (Enteromius atkinsoni) is a species of cyprinid fish.

It is found in Malawi and Tanzania. Its natural habitat is rivers. It is not considered a threatened species by the IUCN.

== Size ==
This species reaches a length of 3.2 cm (1.3 in).

== Etymology ==
The fish is named in honor of Maurice Atkinson of the Lake Victoria and Tanzanian Fisheries Service, "who had a wide interest in the biology and correct identification of East African fishes, and whose contributions in the realm of fisheries development and training, will long be valued by his colleagues and students alike".
