= Enteromius pseudotoppini =

Conservation status
- Vulnerable (IUCN 3.1)

Scientific classification
- Kingdom: Animalia
- Phylum: Chordata
- Class: Actinopterygii
- Order: Cypriniformes
- Family: Cyprinidae
- Subfamily: Smiliogastrinae
- Genus: Enteromius
- Species: E. pseudotoppini

Binomial name
- Enteromius pseudotoppini (Seegers, 1996)

Synonyms
- Barbus pseudotoppini

Species of fish

Enteromius pseudotoppini is a species of ray-finned fish in the family Cyprinidae. It is found only in Tanzania. Its natural habitat is rivers. It is threatened by habitat loss.
