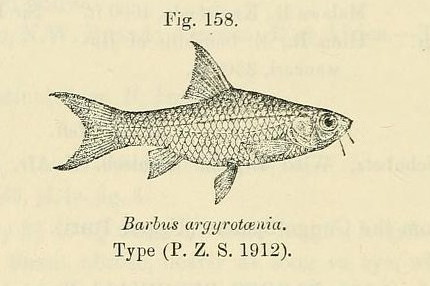

Conservation status
- Least Concern (IUCN 3.1)

Scientific classification
- Kingdom: Animalia
- Phylum: Chordata
- Class: Actinopterygii
- Order: Cypriniformes
- Family: Cyprinidae
- Subfamily: Smiliogastrinae
- Genus: Enteromius
- Species: E. zanzibaricus

Binomial name
- Enteromius zanzibaricus (Peters, 1868)

Synonyms
- Barbus zanzibaricus Peters, 1868; Barbus altus Pfeffer, 1905; Barbus argyrotaenia Boulenger, 1912; Barbus kiperegensis Steindacher, 1914; Barbus pfefferi Boulenger, 1905

= Zanzibar barb =

Species of fish

The Zanzibar barb (Enteromius zanzibaricus) is a species of cyprinid fish.

It is found along the coast of east Africa from Somaliland to Mozambique. Its natural habitats are rivers and freshwater lakes. It is not considered a threatened species by the IUCN.
