= Enteromius erythrozonus =

Conservation status
- Data Deficient (IUCN 3.1)

Scientific classification
- Kingdom: Animalia
- Phylum: Chordata
- Class: Actinopterygii
- Order: Cypriniformes
- Family: Cyprinidae
- Subfamily: Smiliogastrinae
- Genus: Enteromius
- Species: E. erythrozonus

Binomial name
- Enteromius erythrozonus Poll & J. G. Lambert, 1959

Synonyms
- Barbus erythrozonus Poll & Lambert, 1959

Species of fish

Enteromius erythrozonus is a species of cyprinid fish endemic to the Republic of the Congo where it is only known from the Foulakari River. This species reaches a length of 3.4 centimetres (1.3 in) TL. Aside from being hunted for human consumption, nothing else is known about the species.
