= Luika barb =

Conservation status
- Least Concern (IUCN 3.1)

Scientific classification
- Kingdom: Animalia
- Phylum: Chordata
- Class: Actinopterygii
- Order: Cypriniformes
- Family: Cyprinidae
- Subfamily: Smiliogastrinae
- Genus: Enteromius
- Species: E. luikae

Binomial name
- Enteromius luikae (Ricardo, 1939)

Synonyms
- Barbus luikae Ricardo, 1939

Species of fish

The Luika barb (Enteromius luikae) is a species of cyprinid fish.

It is found in Burundi and Tanzania. Its natural habitats are rivers and intermittent freshwater lakes. It is not considered a threatened species by the IUCN.
