= Nemacheilus subfusca =

Conservation status
- Least Concern (IUCN 3.1)

Scientific classification
- Kingdom: Animalia
- Phylum: Chordata
- Class: Actinopterygii
- Order: Cypriniformes
- Family: Nemacheilidae
- Genus: Nemacheilus
- Species: N. subfusca

Binomial name
- Nemacheilus subfusca McClelland, 1839

Synonyms
- Schistura subfusca McClelland, 1839

Species of fish

Nemacheilus subfusca is a species of ray-finned fish from the family Nemacheilidae in the genus Nemacheilus which is found in Assam and China. It inhabits pebbly streams. N. subfusca was synonymised with Neomacheilus scaturigina which was described by Menon from the collection of Hamilton. It was, however, then treated as a valid species and sometimes placed in the genus Schistura.
