= Schistura fusinotata =

Conservation status
- Least Concern (IUCN 3.1)

Scientific classification
- Kingdom: Animalia
- Phylum: Chordata
- Class: Actinopterygii
- Order: Cypriniformes
- Family: Nemacheilidae
- Genus: Schistura
- Species: S. fusinotata

Binomial name
- Schistura fusinotata Kottelat, 2000

Species of fish

Schistura fusinotata is a species of ray-finned fish in the stone loach genus Schistura. This species has been recorded from stretches of the main Kong River and its tributaries in Laos where there are substrates consisting of stones and large gravel.
