= Schistura scripta =

Scientific classification
- Kingdom: Animalia
- Phylum: Chordata
- Class: Actinopterygii
- Order: Cypriniformes
- Family: Nemacheilidae
- Genus: Schistura
- Species: S. scripta

Binomial name
- Schistura scripta Sudasinghe, 2018

Species of fish

Schistura scripta, is a species of ray-finned fish in the genus Schistura, newly identified from Sri Lanka. It is the third species of Schistura stone loach described from Sri Lanka, the other being the widely distributed native species Schistura notostigma and endemic Schistura madhavai.

== Etymology ==
The specific name scripta means "written words" in Latin.

== Description ==
Body size is 42.5 mm SL. S. scripta can be identified by incomplete lateral line with 53–76 pores. There are 7–13 post-dorsal bars and 7½ branched dorsal-fin rays. suborbital flap absent. Caudal fin emarginate with 8+* branched rays. Caudal peduncle has a small dorsal adipose crest. Mouth inferior and curved. Lips thick. Body pale brownish with dark brown bars. Barbels light brown. There is an incomplete black bar at the base of caudal-fin. Rays of pectoral, pelvic and anal fins yellowish, whereas those in caudal and dorsal fins are yellowish orange. A black spot found at the origin of dorsal-fin. Two or three rows of black spots visible on dorsal and caudal fin rays.

== Ecology ==
The species was discovered in a fast-flowing stream running through palm-oil plantations of Nakiyadeniya Estate in Gin River basin.
