= Schistura kontumensis =

Conservation status
- Vulnerable (IUCN 3.1)

Scientific classification
- Kingdom: Animalia
- Phylum: Chordata
- Class: Actinopterygii
- Order: Cypriniformes
- Family: Nemacheilidae
- Genus: Schistura
- Species: S. kontumensis

Binomial name
- Schistura kontumensis Freyhof & Serov, 2001

Species of fish

Schistura kontumensis is a species of ray-finned fish, a stone loach, in the genus Schistura. It has only been recorded a few times from large rivers and streams in the headwaters of the Sesan River which is a tributary of the Sekong River, which is a tributary of the Mekong, in Kontum Province, Vietnam. When sampled., however, it was found to be common and hardy, tolerating water which had flown through urban areas and which had been polluted with water used for washing. Iys population trends are unknown and despite its hardiness it may have been affected by dams.
