= Schistura daubentoni =

Conservation status
- Least Concern (IUCN 3.1)

Scientific classification
- Kingdom: Animalia
- Phylum: Chordata
- Class: Actinopterygii
- Order: Cypriniformes
- Family: Nemacheilidae
- Genus: Schistura
- Species: S. daubentoni

Binomial name
- Schistura daubentoni Kottelat, 1990

Species of fish

Schistura daubentoni is a species of ray-finned fish in the stone loach genus Schistura. Iyt is found in the middle Mekong drainage in central Laos and northern Cambodia, including the Tonlé San and lower Kong River and it is considered that it is probably found in the reaches of the Mekong between these areas and in eastern Thailand. The specific name honours François d'Aubenton a zoologist at the Muséum National d'Histoire naturelle in Paris, who collected type specimen in 1964.
