= S. cataracta =

S. cataracta could refer to one of the following species:

- Schistura cataracta, a ray-finned fish in the genus Schistura
- Scolopendra cataracta, a centipede in the family Scolopendridae
