= Schistura laterimaculata =

Scientific classification
- Kingdom: Animalia
- Phylum: Chordata
- Class: Actinopterygii
- Order: Cypriniformes
- Family: Nemacheilidae
- Genus: Schistura
- Species: S. laterimaculata

Binomial name
- Schistura laterimaculata Kottelat, 1990

Species of fish

Schistura laterimaculata is a species of ray-finned fish in the genus Schistura found in Thailand. This species may be a junior synonym of Schistura nicholsi
