= Schistura clatrata =

Conservation status
- Least Concern (IUCN 3.1)

Scientific classification
- Kingdom: Animalia
- Phylum: Chordata
- Class: Actinopterygii
- Order: Cypriniformes
- Family: Nemacheilidae
- Genus: Schistura
- Species: S. clatrata

Binomial name
- Schistura clatrata Kottelat, 2000

Species of fish

Schistura clatrata is a species of ray-finned fish in the stone loach genus Schistura. It occurs in the Kong River basin in southern Laos. It was found in several sites within rapids with stony bottoms on two separate surveys in 1999 and 2009.
