= Schistura carbonaria =

Conservation status
- Least Concern (IUCN 3.1)

Scientific classification
- Kingdom: Animalia
- Phylum: Chordata
- Class: Actinopterygii
- Order: Cypriniformes
- Family: Nemacheilidae
- Genus: Schistura
- Species: S. carbonaria

Binomial name
- Schistura carbonaria Freyhof & Serov, 2001

Species of fish

Schistura carbonaria is a species of ray-finned fish in the stone loach genus Schistura. It is found in central Vietnam in some coastal drainage systems, from the Ve River to the Qang Tri River, and the River Xe Kong, in the Xe Kong its range may extend into Laos. It can be found in medium-sized rivers and streams which have a strong current over a substrate of rocks and gravel.
