= Schistura nomi =

Conservation status
- Least Concern (IUCN 3.1)

Scientific classification
- Kingdom: Animalia
- Phylum: Chordata
- Class: Actinopterygii
- Order: Cypriniformes
- Family: Nemacheilidae
- Genus: Schistura
- Species: S. nomi

Binomial name
- Schistura nomi Kottelat, 2000

Species of fish

Schistura nomi is a species of ray-finned fish, a stone loach, in the genus Schistura. This species is found in streams which have a moderate to fast current, in riffles, where the bed consists of gravel to stone in the Kong River in Laos. The specific name honours a Mr Nom who was the describer, Maurice Kottelat's, driver in Laos.
