= Arifi =

Arifi is a surname. Notable people with the surname include:

- Ahmed Arifi Pasha (1819 or 1830–1895/96), Ottoman statesman
- Doni Arifi (born 2002), Finnish footballer
- Mohamad al-Arifi (born 1970), Saudi author and scholar
- Shpejtim Arifi (born 1979), Kosovar Albanian footballer
- Teuta Arifi (born 1969), Macedonian politician

== See also ==
- Schistura arifi, is a species of ray-finned fish in the stone loach
