= Schistura imitator =

Conservation status
- Least Concern (IUCN 3.1)

Scientific classification
- Kingdom: Animalia
- Phylum: Chordata
- Class: Actinopterygii
- Order: Cypriniformes
- Family: Nemacheilidae
- Genus: Schistura
- Species: S. imitator

Binomial name
- Schistura imitator Kottelat, 2000

Species of fish

Schistura imitator is a species of ray-finned fish in the stone loach genus Schistura which has only been recorded from rapids and stony reaches of the Kong River in Laos.
