= Schistura khamtanhi =

Conservation status
- Data Deficient (IUCN 3.1)

Scientific classification
- Kingdom: Animalia
- Phylum: Chordata
- Class: Actinopterygii
- Order: Cypriniformes
- Family: Nemacheilidae
- Genus: Schistura
- Species: S. khamtanhi

Binomial name
- Schistura khamtanhi Kottelat, 2000

Species of fish

Schistura khamtanhi is a species of ray-finned fish in the genus most speciose genus in the stone loach family, Schistura. It is found in the Kong River basin in Laos and in the main Mekong river in Cambodia and Laos where it is abundant, being an important quarry species for the fish traps at Kohne Falls. It inhabits rapids and Sony bottomed stretches of the main Mekong and its tributaries and it migrates past the Kohne Falls in January and February annually. It is the only member of the genus Schistura which is known to be migratory. The specific name honours Khamtanh Vatthanatham, a Fisheries Programme Officer of the Mekong River Commission who was very helpful to the Maurice Kottelat during his 1999 survey, in which this species was discovered.
