= Schistura tizardi =

Conservation status
- Data Deficient (IUCN 3.1)

Scientific classification
- Kingdom: Animalia
- Phylum: Chordata
- Class: Actinopterygii
- Order: Cypriniformes
- Family: Nemacheilidae
- Genus: Schistura
- Species: S. tizardi

Binomial name
- Schistura tizardi Kottelat, 2000

Species of fish

Schistura tizardi is a species of ray-finned fish, a stone loach, in the genus Schistura from the Kong River basin in southern Laos. It was found in rapids and stretches of river with stone bottoms, in both the mainstream and the tributaries.
