= Pertica (disambiguation) =

Pertica is a genus of extinct plants.

Pertica may also refer to:

- Pertica (unit), a Roman length usually about 3 m
- Pertica, the name of the dependent territory of Roman Carthage that connected the colony to the local African towns of its hinterland.
- Pertica Alta, an Italian municipality of the province of Brescia, Lombardy
- Pertica Bassa, an Italian municipality of the province of Brescia, Lombardy
- Bill Pertica (1898–1967), an American baseball player
- Schistura pertica, a genus of fishes
- Segestrioides, a genus of spiders synonymized with Pertica

== See also ==
- Perticara, an Italian hamlet of Novafeltria (RN), Emilia-Romagna
- Corleto Perticara, an Italian municipality of the province of Potenza, Basilicata
