= Schistura vinciguerrae =

Conservation status
- Least Concern (IUCN 3.1)

Scientific classification
- Kingdom: Animalia
- Phylum: Chordata
- Class: Actinopterygii
- Order: Cypriniformes
- Family: Nemacheilidae
- Genus: Schistura
- Species: S. vinciguerrae

Binomial name
- Schistura vinciguerrae (Hora, 1935)

Species of fish

Schistura vinciguerrae is a species of ray-finned fish, a stone loach, in the genus Schistura which is found in the Irrawaddy and Salween River basins in Myanmar, and the Chindwin drainage in Myanmar and Manipur, India. The specific name honours the Italian ichthyologist Decio Vinciguerra, who classified Burmese fishes and described the species, Schistura multifasciata, which S. vinciguerrae was separated from.
