= Schistura diminuta =

Scientific classification
- Kingdom: Animalia
- Phylum: Chordata
- Class: Actinopterygii
- Order: Cypriniformes
- Family: Nemacheilidae
- Genus: Schistura
- Species: S. diminuta

Binomial name
- Schistura diminuta Ou, Montaña, Winemiller & Conway, 2011

Species of fish

Schistura diminuta is a species of stone loach from the genus Schistura. It has so far only been recorded from the Kong River from the Mekong River drainage in Cambodia. Its describers described it as a "miniature species".
