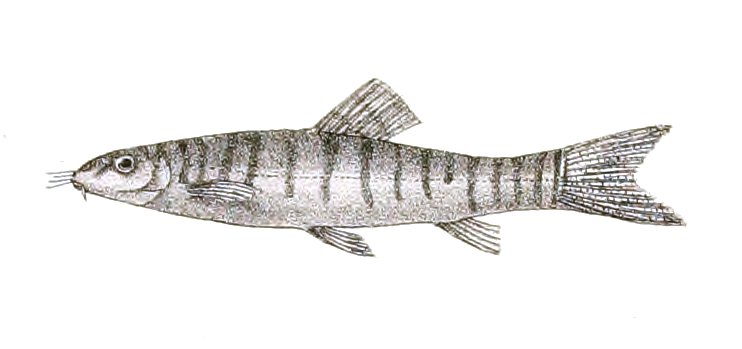

Conservation status
- Data Deficient (IUCN 3.1)

Scientific classification
- Kingdom: Animalia
- Phylum: Chordata
- Class: Actinopterygii
- Order: Cypriniformes
- Family: Nemacheilidae
- Genus: Schistura
- Species: S. zonata

Binomial name
- Schistura zonata McClelland, 1839

= Schistura zonata =

Species of fish

Schistura zonata is a species of ray-finned fish, a stone loach, in the genus Schistura from hill streams in Assam, India. Its exact distribution is unknown and there have been records of this species since the type specimens were collected. Some authorities include Nemacheilus mugah as a synonym of S. zonata, which in turn has been regarded as a synonym of Schistura scaturigina, but these views are not currently widely accepted.
