= Schistura gangetica =

Scientific classification
- Kingdom: Animalia
- Phylum: Chordata
- Class: Actinopterygii
- Order: Cypriniformes
- Family: Nemacheilidae
- Genus: Schistura
- Species: S. gangetica

Binomial name
- Schistura gangetica Menon, 1987

Synonyms
- Nemacheilus gangeticus Menon, 1987

Species of fish

Schistura gangetica is a species of ray-finned fish in the genus Schistura. It occurs in the Himalayas in Uttar Pradesh where it can be found in pebble bedded streams with a swift current and clear water.
