= Schistura psittacula =

Conservation status
- Data Deficient (IUCN 3.1)

Scientific classification
- Kingdom: Animalia
- Phylum: Chordata
- Class: Actinopterygii
- Order: Cypriniformes
- Family: Nemacheilidae
- Genus: Schistura
- Species: S. psittacula

Binomial name
- Schistura psittacula Freyhof & Serov, 2001

Species of fish

Schistura psittacula is a species of ray-finned fish, a stone loach in the genus Schistura. It is found in two rivers in central Vietnam where it inhabits riffles in medium-sized mountain rivers and streams in riffles which have a swift current over gravel beds. It feeds on aquatic invertebrates.
