= Schistura disparizona =

Scientific classification
- Kingdom: Animalia
- Phylum: Chordata
- Class: Actinopterygii
- Order: Cypriniformes
- Family: Nemacheilidae
- Genus: Schistura
- Species: S. disparizona

Binomial name
- Schistura disparizona W. Zhou & Kottelat, 2005

Species of fish

Schistura disparizona is a species of ray-finned fish in the stone loach genus Schistura from the upper Salween in Yunnan.
