= Schistura macrotaenia =

Conservation status
- Data Deficient (IUCN 3.1)

Scientific classification
- Kingdom: Animalia
- Phylum: Chordata
- Class: Actinopterygii
- Order: Cypriniformes
- Family: Nemacheilidae
- Genus: Schistura
- Species: S. macrotaenia

Binomial name
- Schistura macrotaenia (J. X. Yang, 1990)

Synonyms
- Nemacheilus macrotaenia Yang, 1990

Species of fish

Schistura macrotaenia is a species of ray-finned fish, a stone loach, in the genus Schistura. It occurs in the Tengtiao Jiang River drainage in Yunnan and may also occur in the same river drainage in northern Vietnam.
