= Schistura spekuli =

Conservation status
- Vulnerable (IUCN 3.1)

Scientific classification
- Kingdom: Animalia
- Phylum: Chordata
- Class: Actinopterygii
- Order: Cypriniformes
- Family: Nemacheilidae
- Genus: Schistura
- Species: S. spekuli

Binomial name
- Schistura spekuli Kottelat, 2004

Species of fish

Schistura spekuli is a species of ray-finned fish, a troglobitic stone loach, in the genus Schistura. It has been recorded from a single cave in central Vietnam. The specific name refers to SPEKUL, the speleological club of the University of Leuven in Belgium.
