= Schistura hingi =

Conservation status
- Least Concern (IUCN 3.1)

Scientific classification
- Kingdom: Animalia
- Phylum: Chordata
- Class: Actinopterygii
- Order: Cypriniformes
- Family: Nemacheilidae
- Genus: Schistura
- Species: S. hingi

Binomial name
- Schistura hingi (Herre, 1934)

Synonyms
- Homaloptera hingi Herre, 1934

Species of fish

Schistura hingi is a species of ray-finned fish in the most speciose genus of stone loaches, Schistura. It occurs in the Pearl River basin of southeastern China and the coastal drainages in central Vietnam, it probably also occurs in the costal drainages of northern Vietnam too where it inhabits medium-sized rivers and streams where a substrate of rocks and gravel lies in riffles. The specific name honours a specimen collector, Ah Hing, whose efficiency in collecting for the botanist-ornithologist Geoffrey Herklots of Hong Kong University, Hing's patience and skill enabled Herre "to get many specimens".
