= Schistura paucifasciata =

Conservation status
- Data Deficient (IUCN 3.1)

Scientific classification
- Kingdom: Animalia
- Phylum: Chordata
- Class: Actinopterygii
- Order: Cypriniformes
- Family: Nemacheilidae
- Genus: Schistura
- Species: S. paucifasciata

Binomial name
- Schistura paucifasciata (Hora, 1929)

Synonyms
- Nemachilus paucifasciatus Hora, 1929

Species of fish

Schistura paucifasciata is a species of ray-finned fish, a stone loach, in the genus Schistura. This species is known only from Hwe-gna-sang River in the Hsipaw State, in the northern Shan States of Myanmar, and has not been recorded since the type was collected. It is a benthic species which is found in hill streams with cool, flowing water.
