= Schistura ephelis =

Conservation status
- Data Deficient (IUCN 3.1)

Scientific classification
- Kingdom: Animalia
- Phylum: Chordata
- Class: Actinopterygii
- Order: Cypriniformes
- Family: Nemacheilidae
- Genus: Schistura
- Species: S. ephelis

Binomial name
- Schistura ephelis Kottelat, 2000

Species of fish

Schistura ephelis is a species of ray-finned fish in the largest genus of stone loaches, Schistura. It is known only from the drainage basin of the Nam Ngum in Laos where it has been collected from among stones in riffles.
