= Schistura manipurensis =

Conservation status
- Near Threatened (IUCN 3.1)

Scientific classification
- Kingdom: Animalia
- Phylum: Chordata
- Class: Actinopterygii
- Order: Cypriniformes
- Family: Nemacheilidae
- Genus: Schistura
- Species: S. manipurensis

Binomial name
- Schistura manipurensis (Chaudhuri, 1912)

Synonyms
- Nemacheilus manipurensis Chaudhuri, 1912; Noemacheilus manipurensis (Chaudhuri, 1912)

Species of fish

Schistura manipurensis is a species of ray-finned fish, a stone loach in the genus Schistura. It is a benthic species of clear, fast flowing hill streams with pebbly beds which is found in the Chindwin basin in the Indian states of Manipur and Nagaland, there have also been unconfirmed reports from the basin of the Brahmaputra.
