= Schistura personata =

Conservation status
- Near Threatened (IUCN 3.1)

Scientific classification
- Kingdom: Animalia
- Phylum: Chordata
- Class: Actinopterygii
- Order: Cypriniformes
- Family: Nemacheilidae
- Genus: Schistura
- Species: S. personata

Binomial name
- Schistura personata Kottelat, 2000

Species of fish

Schistura personata is a species of ray-finned fish, a stone loach, in the genus Schistura. It has only been recorded in the Nam San, a tributary of the Nam Ngum in the Mekong Basin of Laos where it can be found in moderately fast or fast flowing streams, among riffles, with a stone or gravel bed. Its population has been impacted by dams and by deforestation, agriculture and small scale gold mining. These factors collectively contribute to a decline in its population.
