= Schistura leukensis =

Conservation status
- Critically Endangered (IUCN 3.1)

Scientific classification
- Kingdom: Animalia
- Phylum: Chordata
- Class: Actinopterygii
- Order: Cypriniformes
- Family: Nemacheilidae
- Genus: Schistura
- Species: S. leukensis

Binomial name
- Schistura leukensis Kottelat, 2000

Species of fish

Schistura leukensis is a species of ray-finned fish, a stone loach in the genus Schistura. It has only been recorded from a single river, a tributary of the Mekong in Laos. This river has been affected by damming upstream of this species' main habitat and it is unknown how this has impacted the population. Other human activities such as deforestation, agriculture, siltation and pollution may have also had effects on this species.
