= Schistura sikmaiensis =

Conservation status
- Least Concern (IUCN 3.1)

Scientific classification
- Kingdom: Animalia
- Phylum: Chordata
- Class: Actinopterygii
- Order: Cypriniformes
- Family: Nemacheilidae
- Genus: Schistura
- Species: S. sikmaiensis

Binomial name
- Schistura sikmaiensis (Hora, 1921)

Species of ray-finned fish

Schistura sikmaiensis is a species of ray-finned fish, a stone loach in the genus Schistura. It is a benthic species which is found in cool, fast flowing streams with gravelly beds. It is found in the Irrawaddy River in Yunnan, Manipur and in Myanmar, it has been reported in Bangladesh and elsewhere in India.
