= Schistura rara =

Scientific classification
- Kingdom: Animalia
- Phylum: Chordata
- Class: Actinopterygii
- Order: Cypriniformes
- Family: Nemacheilidae
- Genus: Schistura
- Species: S. rara

Binomial name
- Schistura rara (S. Q. Zhu & W. X. Cao, 1987)

Synonyms
- Nemacheilus rarus Zhu & Cao, 1987

Species of fish

Schistura rara is a species of ray-finned fish, a stone loach, in the genus Schistura. The species is found in the Bei River in Guangdong, China.
