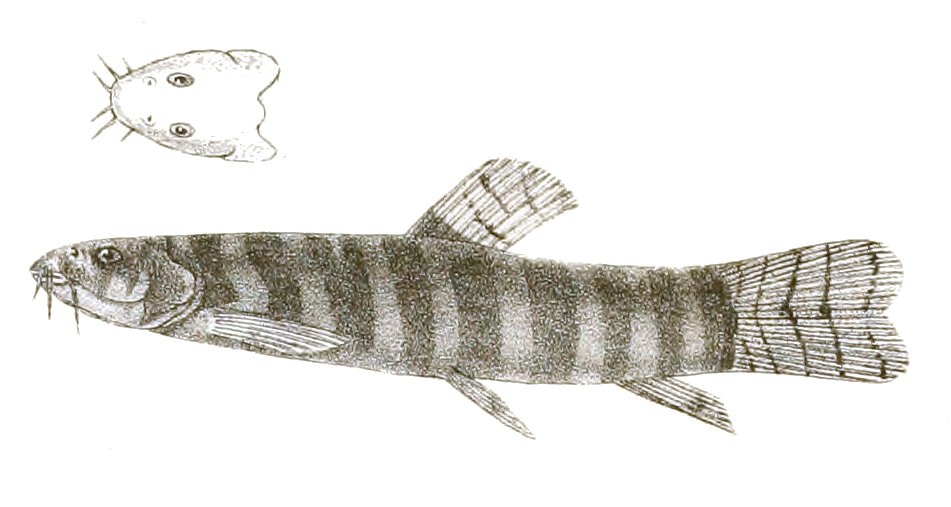

Conservation status
- Least Concern (IUCN 3.1)

Scientific classification
- Kingdom: Animalia
- Phylum: Chordata
- Class: Actinopterygii
- Order: Cypriniformes
- Family: Nemacheilidae
- Genus: Schistura
- Species: S. denisoni

Binomial name
- Schistura denisoni (F. Day, 1867)

Synonyms
- Nemacheilus denisoni F. Day, 1867; Noemacheilus rendahli Bănărescu & Nalbant, 1968; Schistura rendahli (Bănărescu & Nalbant, 1968)

= Schistura denisoni =

Species of fish

Schistura denisoni is a species of ray-finned fish in the stone loach genus Schistura described from the Bhavani river of Tamil Nadu.
