= Schistura similis =

Conservation status
- Data Deficient (IUCN 3.1)

Scientific classification
- Kingdom: Animalia
- Phylum: Chordata
- Class: Actinopterygii
- Order: Cypriniformes
- Family: Nemacheilidae
- Genus: Schistura
- Species: S. similis

Binomial name
- Schistura similis Kottelat, 1990

Species of fish

Schistura similis is a species of ray-finned fish, a stone age, in the genus Schistura. It occurs in the Mae Nam Noi drainage, a tributary of the Salween which forms the border between Thailand and Myanmar. The species has only been recorded in Thailand but most likely occurs in Myanmar too. It has been recorded in streams with a moderate to fast current, in riffles, over substrates consisting of gravel to stone.
