= Schistura shadiwalensis =

Scientific classification
- Kingdom: Animalia
- Phylum: Chordata
- Class: Actinopterygii
- Order: Cypriniformes
- Family: Nemacheilidae
- Genus: Schistura
- Species: S. shadiwalensis

Binomial name
- Schistura shadiwalensis Mirza & Nalbant, 1981

Species of Actinopterygii

Schistura shadiwalensis is a species of ray-finned fish, a stone loach, in the genus Schistura from Pakistan.
