= Schistura acuticephala =

Scientific classification
- Kingdom: Animalia
- Phylum: Chordata
- Class: Actinopterygii
- Order: Cypriniformes
- Family: Nemacheilidae
- Genus: Schistura
- Species: S. acuticephala

Binomial name
- Schistura acuticephala (Hora, 1929)

Synonyms
- Nemacheilus acuticephalus (Hora, 1929); Noemacheilus acuticephalus (Hora, 1929)

Species of fish

Schistura acuticephala is a species of ray-finned fish in the stone loach genus Schistura. It occurs in the basin of the Irrawaddy River in Myanmar.
