= Schistura epixenos =

Scientific classification
- Kingdom: Animalia
- Phylum: Chordata
- Class: Actinopterygii
- Order: Cypriniformes
- Family: Nemacheilidae
- Genus: Schistura
- Species: S. epixenos

Binomial name
- Schistura epixenos Kottelat, 2017

Species of fish

Schistura epixenos is a species of stone loach in the genus Schistura from the Nakai Plateau in Laos. It was described by the Belgian ichthyologist Maurice Kottelat in 2017 and does not feature in Fishbase yet.
