= Schistura schultzi =

Conservation status
- Data Deficient (IUCN 3.1)

Scientific classification
- Kingdom: Animalia
- Phylum: Chordata
- Class: Actinopterygii
- Order: Cypriniformes
- Family: Nemacheilidae
- Genus: Schistura
- Species: S. schultzi

Binomial name
- Schistura schultzi (H. M. Smith, 1945)

Synonyms
- Noemacheilus schultzi Smith, 1945; Nemacheilus schultzi (Smith, 1945)

Species of fish

Schistura schultzi is a species of ray-finned fish, a stone loach, in the genus Schistura. It has been recorded from the Mekong in Chiang Rai Province and Loei Province in Thailand, it should also be present in Bokeo Province in Laos. Almost nothing is known about this species biology. The specific name honours Leonard Peter Schultz (1901–1986) who was Curator of Fishes at the United States National Museum.
