= Schistura devdevi =

Conservation status
- Near Threatened (IUCN 3.1)

Scientific classification
- Kingdom: Animalia
- Phylum: Chordata
- Class: Actinopterygii
- Order: Cypriniformes
- Family: Nemacheilidae
- Genus: Schistura
- Species: S. devdevi

Binomial name
- Schistura devdevi (Hora, 1935)

Synonyms
- Nemacheilus devdevi Hora, 1935

Species of fish

Schistura devdevi is a species of ray-finned fish in the stone loach genus Schistura. It is found in clear, swift streams with pebble beds in upland areas of the Indian states of Arunachal Pradesh, Assam, Sikkim and West Bengal, as well as in Nepal. It sometimes appears in the aquarium trade. The specific name honours Dr Dev Dev Mukerji of the Zoological Survey of India.
