= Schistura yersini =

Scientific classification
- Kingdom: Animalia
- Phylum: Chordata
- Class: Actinopterygii
- Order: Cypriniformes
- Family: Nemacheilidae
- Genus: Schistura
- Species: S. yersini

Binomial name
- Schistura yersini Freyhof & Serov, 2001

Species of fish

Schistura yersini is a species of ray-finned fish, a stone loach, in the genus Schistura which is found in two mountain rivers near Dalat in Vietnam. The species is abundant in steep, streams and rivers which have a gravel or rocky substrate and fast current. It is resistant to organic pollution and human disturbance of its habitat and is able to persist in streams flowing through settlements. It is most common in riffles and rapids where the water flow is greater than 1 metre per second below the surface. The specific name honours the Swiss biologist and humanist Alexandre Yersin (1863–1943), who spent a great deal of his life working around Dalat near where the original type of this species was collected.
