= Schistura latifasciata =

Scientific classification
- Kingdom: Animalia
- Phylum: Chordata
- Class: Actinopterygii
- Order: Cypriniformes
- Family: Nemacheilidae
- Genus: Schistura
- Species: S. latifasciata

Binomial name
- Schistura latifasciata (S. Q. Zhu & S. H. Wang, 1985)

Synonyms
- Noemacheilus latifasciatus Zhu & Wang, 1985

Species of fish

Schistura latifasciata is a species of ray-finned fish, a stone loach, in the genus Schistura from the Mekong basin in Yunnan.
