= Schistura horai =

Scientific classification
- Kingdom: Animalia
- Phylum: Chordata
- Class: Actinopterygii
- Division: Teleostei
- Order: Cypriniformes
- Family: Nemacheilidae
- Genus: Schistura
- Species: S. horai

Binomial name
- Schistura horai (Menon, 1952)

Synonyms
- Nemacheilus horai Menon, 1952

Species of fish

Schistura horai is a species of freshwater ray-finned fish belonging to the family Nemacheilidae, the stone loaches. It is found in India and Pakistan. It is named in honour of the ichthyologist Sunder Lal Hora (1896–1955), who was the Director of the Zoological Survey of India and who collected the type specimen in 1926 in Himachal Pradesh. >
