= Schistura sertata =

Conservation status
- Data Deficient (IUCN 3.1)

Scientific classification
- Kingdom: Animalia
- Phylum: Chordata
- Class: Actinopterygii
- Order: Cypriniformes
- Family: Nemacheilidae
- Genus: Schistura
- Species: S. sertata

Binomial name
- Schistura sertata Kottelat, 2000

Species of fish

Schistura sertata is a species of ray-finned fish, a stone loach, in the genus Schistura. It is only found in the Nam Xi, a small stream near Luang Prabang in Laos, where it was found between tree roots and among leaf litter within the stream.
