= Schistura nilgiriensis =

Scientific classification
- Kingdom: Animalia
- Phylum: Chordata
- Class: Actinopterygii
- Order: Cypriniformes
- Family: Nemacheilidae
- Genus: Schistura
- Species: S. nilgiriensis

Binomial name
- Schistura nilgiriensis (Menon, 1987)

Synonyms
- Nemacheilus nilgiriensis Menon, 1987

Species of fish

Schistura nilgiriensis is a species of ray-finned fish in the genus Schistura.

== Footnotes ==
- Froese, Rainer; Pauly, Daniel (eds.). "Nemacheilus nilgiriensis". FishBase.
