= Schistura nudidorsum =

Conservation status
- Endangered (IUCN 3.1)

Scientific classification
- Kingdom: Animalia
- Phylum: Chordata
- Class: Actinopterygii
- Order: Cypriniformes
- Family: Nemacheilidae
- Genus: Schistura
- Species: S. nudidorsum

Binomial name
- Schistura nudidorsum Kottelat, 1998

Species of fish

Schistura nudidorsum is a species of ray-finned fish, a stone loach, in the genus Schistura. This species has only been recorded from the drainage basins of the Nam Theun and Nam Gnouang, tributaries of the Mekong in Laos. It occurs in streams with a moderate to fast current and a substrate which varies from gravel to stone, in riffles. It is threatened by the construction of dams, as well as logging, deforestation, agriculture and gold mining.
