= Schistura finis =

Conservation status
- Data Deficient (IUCN 3.1)

Scientific classification
- Kingdom: Animalia
- Phylum: Chordata
- Class: Actinopterygii
- Order: Cypriniformes
- Family: Nemacheilidae
- Genus: Schistura
- Species: S. finis

Binomial name
- Schistura finis Kottelat, 2000

Species of fish

Schistura finis is a species of ray-finned fish in the genus Schistura, the most speciose of the stone loach genera. It has only been recorded from small streams in the headwaters of the Nam Mo River on the frontier between Laos and Vietnam.
