= Schistura altipedunculata =

Scientific classification
- Kingdom: Animalia
- Phylum: Chordata
- Class: Actinopterygii
- Order: Cypriniformes
- Family: Nemacheilidae
- Genus: Schistura
- Species: S. altipedunculata

Binomial name
- Schistura altipedunculata (Bănărescu & Nalbant, 1968)

Species of fish

Schistura altipedunculata is a species of ray-finned fish in the genus Schistura.
