= Schistura tubulinaris =

Conservation status
- Vulnerable (IUCN 3.1)

Scientific classification
- Kingdom: Animalia
- Phylum: Chordata
- Class: Actinopterygii
- Order: Cypriniformes
- Family: Nemacheilidae
- Genus: Schistura
- Species: S. tubulinaris

Binomial name
- Schistura tubulinaris Kottelat, 1998

Species of fish

Schistura tubulinaris is a species of ray-finned fish in the genus Schistura, it is endemic to the Nam Theun of the Mekong basin in Laos.
