= Schistura coruscans =

Conservation status
- Data Deficient (IUCN 3.1)

Scientific classification
- Kingdom: Animalia
- Phylum: Chordata
- Class: Actinopterygii
- Order: Cypriniformes
- Family: Nemacheilidae
- Genus: Schistura
- Species: S. coruscans

Binomial name
- Schistura coruscans Kottelat, 2000

Species of ray-finned fish

Schistura coruscans is a species of ray-finned fish in the stone loach genus Schistura from the Nam San drainage, a tributary of the Nam Ngum in Laos.
