= Schistura reidi =

Conservation status
- Least Concern (IUCN 3.1)

Scientific classification
- Kingdom: Animalia
- Phylum: Chordata
- Class: Actinopterygii
- Order: Cypriniformes
- Family: Nemacheilidae
- Genus: Schistura
- Species: S. reidi

Binomial name
- Schistura reidi (H. M. Smith, 1945)

Species of fish

Schistura reidi is a species of ray-finned fish, a stone loach, in the genus Schistura. It occurs in the Salween basin in Mae Hong Son Province, Thailand, and probably in Myanmar too as the Salween forms the border between Myanmar and Thailand in this area. The specific name honors Earl D. Reid of the Division of Fishes at the United States National Museum.
