= Schistura dayi =

Conservation status
- Least Concern (IUCN 3.1)

Scientific classification
- Kingdom: Animalia
- Phylum: Chordata
- Class: Actinopterygii
- Order: Cypriniformes
- Family: Nemacheilidae
- Genus: Schistura
- Species: S. dayi

Binomial name
- Schistura dayi (Hora, 1935)

Synonyms
- Nemachilus dayi Hora, 1935

Species of fish

Schistura dayi is a species of stone loach from the genus Schistura. It is found in small, shallow, fast flowing streams which have sandy or pebbly beds in the Indian states of Chhattisgarh, Jharkhand, Madhya Pradesh and Orissa.
