= Schistura afasciata =

Scientific classification
- Kingdom: Animalia
- Phylum: Chordata
- Class: Actinopterygii
- Order: Cypriniformes
- Family: Nemacheilidae
- Genus: Schistura
- Species: S. afasciata

Binomial name
- Schistura afasciata Mirza & Bănărescu, 1981

Species of fish

Schistura afasciata is a species of ray-finned fish in the genus Schistura.
