= Schistura dorsizona =

Conservation status
- Least Concern (IUCN 3.1)

Scientific classification
- Kingdom: Animalia
- Phylum: Chordata
- Class: Actinopterygii
- Order: Cypriniformes
- Family: Nemacheilidae
- Genus: Schistura
- Species: S. dorsizona

Binomial name
- Schistura dorsizona Kottelat, 1998

Species of fish

Schistura dorsizona is a species of ray-finned fish in the stone loach genus Schistura. It is known to occur in the Mekong basin in Laos and Cambodia, it is expected that it occurs in eastern Thailand too.
