= Schistura machensis =

Scientific classification
- Kingdom: Animalia
- Phylum: Chordata
- Class: Actinopterygii
- Order: Cypriniformes
- Family: Nemacheilidae
- Genus: Schistura
- Species: S. machensis

Binomial name
- Schistura machensis (Mirza & Nalbant, 1970)

Synonyms
- Noemacheilus horai machensis Mirza & Nalbant, 1970

Species of fish

Schistura machensis is a species of ray-finned fish, a stone loach in the genus Schistura, from Pakistan.

== Footnotes ==
- Froese, Rainer; Pauly, Daniel (eds.). "Schistura machensis". FishBase.
