= Schistura reticulata =

Conservation status
- Endangered (IUCN 3.1)

Scientific classification
- Kingdom: Animalia
- Phylum: Chordata
- Class: Actinopterygii
- Order: Cypriniformes
- Family: Nemacheilidae
- Genus: Schistura
- Species: S. reticulata

Binomial name
- Schistura reticulata Vishwanath & Nebeshwar Sharma, 2004

Species of fish

Schistura reticulata is a species of ray-finned fish, a stone loach in the genus Schistura. It is found in three hill streams in the Chindwin drainage basin on Manipur. In some areas, such as the Lokchao River at Moreh the populations of this species are severely threatened by development and border trade while in other areas it is threatened by destructive fishing techniques using poison and explosives.
