= Schistura breviceps =

Conservation status
- Data Deficient (IUCN 3.1)

Scientific classification
- Kingdom: Animalia
- Phylum: Chordata
- Class: Actinopterygii
- Order: Cypriniformes
- Family: Nemacheilidae
- Genus: Schistura
- Species: S. breviceps

Binomial name
- Schistura breviceps (H. M. Smith, 1945)

Synonyms
- Noemacheilus breviceps Smith, 1945

Species of fish

Schistura breviceps is a species of ray-finned fish in the stone loach genus Schistura. It has only been recorded in the drainage system of the Mae Nam Kok, a tributary of the Mekong in northern Thailand and Myanmar. It has been seen in streams with a moderate flow over gravel or stone stream beds.
