= Schistura doonensis =

Conservation status
- Data Deficient (IUCN 3.1)

Scientific classification
- Kingdom: Animalia
- Phylum: Chordata
- Class: Actinopterygii
- Order: Cypriniformes
- Family: Nemacheilidae
- Genus: Schistura
- Species: S. doonensis

Binomial name
- Schistura doonensis (Tilak & Husain, 1977)

Synonyms
- Nemacheilus doonensis Tilak & Husain, 1977

Species of fish

Schistura doonensis is a species of ray-finned fish in the genus Schistura. from Dehra Dun in Uttar Pradesh where it occurs in clear, swift streams with pebbly beds.

== Footnotes ==
- Froese, Rainer; Pauly, Daniel (eds.). "Nemacheilus doonensis". FishBase.
