= Schistura chapaensis =

Conservation status
- Data Deficient (IUCN 3.1)

Scientific classification
- Kingdom: Animalia
- Phylum: Chordata
- Class: Actinopterygii
- Order: Cypriniformes
- Family: Nemacheilidae
- Genus: Schistura
- Species: S. chapaensis

Binomial name
- Schistura chapaensis (Rendahl (de), 1944)

Synonyms
- Nemacheilus chapaensis Rendahl, 1944; Barbatula chapaensis (Rendahl, 1944)

Species of fish

Schistura chapaensis is a species of ray-finned fish in the stone loach genus Schistura from north western Vietnam.
