= Schistura quasimodo =

Conservation status
- Endangered (IUCN 3.1)

Scientific classification
- Kingdom: Animalia
- Phylum: Chordata
- Class: Actinopterygii
- Order: Cypriniformes
- Family: Nemacheilidae
- Genus: Schistura
- Species: S. quasimodo

Binomial name
- Schistura quasimodo Kottelat, 2000

Species of fish

Schistura quasimodo is a species of stone loach (a ray-finned fish) in the genus Schistura. It is known from a single stream from the Nam Ngum drainage in Laos, a tributary of the Mekong. It has a cylindrical body, sometimes with a conspicuous hump (the species epithet refers to Quasimodo, character in Victor Hugo's The Hunchback of Notre-Dame). The known material suggests a maximum standard length of about 48 mm (1.9 in).

S. quasimodo has a very restricted distribution and may be threatened by pollution from mining activities, sedimentation from deforestation, and hydro-power development.
