= Schistura huapingensis =

Scientific classification
- Kingdom: Animalia
- Phylum: Chordata
- Class: Actinopterygii
- Order: Cypriniformes
- Family: Nemacheilidae
- Genus: Schistura
- Species: S. huapingensis

Binomial name
- Schistura huapingensis (Y. F. Wu & C. Z. Wu, 1992)

Synonyms
- Nemacheilus huapingensis Y. F. Wu & C. Z. Wu, 1992

Species of fish

Schistura huapingensis is a species of ray-finned fish in the genus Nemacheilus, although some authorities place this species in the genus Nemacheilus.

It is a freshwater fish endemic to China.

== Footnotes ==
- Froese, Rainer; Pauly, Daniel (eds.). "Nemacheilus huapingensis". FishBase.
