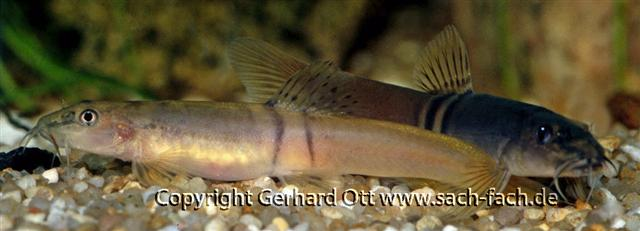

Conservation status
- Data Deficient (IUCN 3.1)

Scientific classification
- Kingdom: Animalia
- Phylum: Chordata
- Class: Actinopterygii
- Order: Cypriniformes
- Family: Nemacheilidae
- Genus: Schistura
- Species: S. balteata

Binomial name
- Schistura balteata (Rendahl (de), 1948)

= Schistura balteata =

Species of fish

Schistura balteata is a species of ray-finned fish in the stone loach genus Schistura. It found in hill streams draining from the Myinmoletkat Taung mountain in Tenasserim in southern Myanmar, and has now been recorded in western Thailand too. It is kept in the aquarium trade where it is often referred to as the sumo loach, the specific name derives from the Latin balteatus, which means baldric or shoulder strap, referring to the colour pattern this species.
