= Schistura rikiki =

Conservation status
- Data Deficient (IUCN 3.1)

Scientific classification
- Kingdom: Animalia
- Phylum: Chordata
- Class: Actinopterygii
- Order: Cypriniformes
- Family: Nemacheilidae
- Genus: Schistura
- Species: S. rikiki

Binomial name
- Schistura rikiki Kottelat, 2000

Species of fish

Schistura rikiki is a species of ray-finned fish, a stone loach, in the genus Schistura. It occurs in the Se Kong basin in southern Laos where it can be found in riffles over substrates of gravel and stones. The specific name rikiki is French slang for small or pint-sized, a reference to its small size.
