= Schistura macrocephalus =

Conservation status
- Data Deficient (IUCN 3.1)

Scientific classification
- Kingdom: Animalia
- Phylum: Chordata
- Class: Actinopterygii
- Order: Cypriniformes
- Family: Nemacheilidae
- Genus: Schistura
- Species: S. macrocephalus

Binomial name
- Schistura macrocephalus Kottelat, 2000

Species of fish

Schistura macrocephalus is a species of ray-finned fish. a stone loach, in the genus Schistura. It occurs in riffles over stony or gravel beds in streams with moderate to fast currents in the Mengla River in Yunnan, a tributary of the Mekong, and the Nam Youan in northern Laos, in turn a tributary of the Mengla.
