= Schistura sokolovi =

Conservation status
- Data Deficient (IUCN 3.1)

Scientific classification
- Kingdom: Animalia
- Phylum: Chordata
- Class: Actinopterygii
- Order: Cypriniformes
- Family: Nemacheilidae
- Genus: Schistura
- Species: S. sokolovi

Binomial name
- Schistura sokolovi Freyhof & Serov, 2001

Species of fish

Schistura sokolovi is a species of ray-finned fish, a stone loach, in the genus Schistura from Vietnam. It occurs in medium-sized to small streams with a current and riffles, over gravel and sandy substrates. The specific name honours the Russian zoologist Vladimir Evgenievich Sokolov (1928-1988) for his contribution to the knowledge of the zoology of central Vietnam.
