= Schistura desmotes =

Conservation status
- Least Concern (IUCN 3.1)

Scientific classification
- Kingdom: Animalia
- Phylum: Chordata
- Class: Actinopterygii
- Order: Cypriniformes
- Family: Nemacheilidae
- Genus: Schistura
- Species: S. desmotes

Binomial name
- Schistura desmotes (Fowler, 1934)

Synonyms
- Nemacheilus desmotes Fowler, 1934; Noemacheilus desmotes (Fowler, 1934); Noemacheilus myrmekia (Fowler, 1935)

Species of fish

Schistura desmotes is a species of ray-finned fish in the stone loach genus Schistura. It is found in Ratchaburi Province of Thailand where it inhabits streams with a moderate current and a gravel or stone substrate. The specific name desmotes mean "prisoner" and refers to the 7–9 broad dark-brown transverse bands on the fish's body, which reminded Fowler of a striped prisoner's uniform.
