= Schistura conirostris =

Scientific classification
- Kingdom: Animalia
- Phylum: Chordata
- Class: Actinopterygii
- Order: Cypriniformes
- Family: Nemacheilidae
- Genus: Schistura
- Species: S. conirostris

Binomial name
- Schistura conirostris (S. Q. Zhu, 1982)

Synonyms
- Nemachilus conirostris Zhu, 1982

Species of fish

Schistura conirostris is a species of ray-finned fish in the stone loach genus Schistura from China.
