= Schistura defectiva =

Conservation status
- Data Deficient (IUCN 3.1)

Scientific classification
- Kingdom: Animalia
- Phylum: Chordata
- Class: Actinopterygii
- Order: Cypriniformes
- Family: Nemacheilidae
- Genus: Schistura
- Species: S. defectiva

Binomial name
- Schistura defectiva Kottelat, 2000

Species of fish

Schistura defectiva is a species of ray-finned fish in the stone loach genus Schistura from Laos.
