= Schistura tirapensis =

Conservation status
- Least Concern (IUCN 3.1)

Scientific classification
- Kingdom: Animalia
- Phylum: Chordata
- Class: Actinopterygii
- Order: Cypriniformes
- Family: Nemacheilidae
- Genus: Schistura
- Species: S. tirapensis

Binomial name
- Schistura tirapensis Kottelat, 1990

Synonyms
- Nemacheilus arunachalensis Menon, 1987; Noemacheilus arunachalensis Menon, 1987; Noemacheilus dattai Menon, 1999

Species of fish

Schistura tirapensis is a species of ray-finned fish, a stone loach, in the genus Schistura. It can be found in hill streams with pebble beds in the Tirap District in Arunachal Pradesh, India.
