= Schistura sijuensis =

Conservation status
- Endangered (IUCN 3.1)

Scientific classification
- Kingdom: Animalia
- Phylum: Chordata
- Class: Actinopterygii
- Order: Cypriniformes
- Family: Nemacheilidae
- Genus: Schistura
- Species: S. sijuensis

Binomial name
- Schistura sijuensis (Menon, 1987)

Species of fish

Schistura sijuensis is a troglobitic species of stone loach endemic to India.

It is only recorded from Siju cave in the Garo Hills of Meghalaya state, Northeast India.
