= Schistura melarancia =

Scientific classification
- Kingdom: Animalia
- Phylum: Chordata
- Class: Actinopterygii
- Order: Cypriniformes
- Family: Nemacheilidae
- Genus: Schistura
- Species: S. melarancia

Binomial name
- Schistura melarancia Kottelat, 2000

Species of fish

Schistura melarancia is a species of ray-finned fish, a stone loach, in the genus Schistura. It is found in the Mekong drainage in Laos and Vietnam. The specific name melarancia is derived from an old Italian word for an orange and refers to the orange-brown colour of the fins and body of this species.
