= Schistura callichroma =

Conservation status
- Data Deficient (IUCN 3.1)

Scientific classification
- Kingdom: Animalia
- Phylum: Chordata
- Class: Actinopterygii
- Order: Cypriniformes
- Family: Nemacheilidae
- Genus: Schistura
- Species: S. callichroma

Binomial name
- Schistura callichroma (S. Q. Zhu & S. H. Wang, 1985)

Synonyms
- Nemacheilus callichromus Zhu & Wang, 1985; Schistura callichromus (Zhu & Wang, 1985)

Species of fish

Schistura callichroma is a species of ray-finned fish in the stone loach genus Schistura from Yunnan.
