= Schistura harnaiensis =

Scientific classification
- Kingdom: Animalia
- Phylum: Chordata
- Class: Actinopterygii
- Order: Cypriniformes
- Family: Nemacheilidae
- Genus: Schistura
- Species: S. harnaiensis

Binomial name
- Schistura harnaiensis (Mirza & Nalbant, 1969)

Synonyms
- Noemacheilus harnaiensis Mirza & Nalbant, 1969

Species of fish

Schistura harnaiensis is a species of ray-finned fish in the stone loach genus Schistura from Pakistan.
