= Schistura kengtungensis =

Conservation status
- Least Concern (IUCN 3.1)

Scientific classification
- Kingdom: Animalia
- Phylum: Chordata
- Class: Actinopterygii
- Order: Cypriniformes
- Family: Nemacheilidae
- Genus: Schistura
- Species: S. kengtungensis

Binomial name
- Schistura kengtungensis (Fowler, 1936)

Synonyms
- Nemacheilus kengtungensis Fowler, 1936

Species of fish

Schistura kengtungensis is a species of ray-finned fish in the stone loach genus Schistura. It is found in the Mekong basin in China, Thailand, Myanmar and Laos.
