= Schistura menanensis =

Conservation status
- Data Deficient (IUCN 3.1)

Scientific classification
- Kingdom: Animalia
- Phylum: Chordata
- Class: Actinopterygii
- Order: Cypriniformes
- Family: Nemacheilidae
- Genus: Schistura
- Species: S. menanensis

Binomial name
- Schistura menanensis (H. M. Smith, 1945)

Synonyms
- Noemacheilus menanensis Smith, 1945

Species of fish

Schistura menanensis is a species of ray-finned fish, a stone loach in the genus Schistura. It has only been recorded in the Mae Nam Nan drainage, a branch of the Chao Phraya in Thailand where it has been observed in streams with moderate to fast currents, in riffles, with gravel to stone beds. The specific name menanensis refers to the type locality of this species on the Mae Nam Nam.
