= Schistura tenura =

Conservation status
- Critically endangered, possibly extinct (IUCN 3.1)

Scientific classification
- Kingdom: Animalia
- Phylum: Chordata
- Class: Actinopterygii
- Order: Cypriniformes
- Family: Nemacheilidae
- Genus: Schistura
- Species: S. tenura

Binomial name
- Schistura tenura Kottelat, 2000

Species of fish

Schistura tenura is a species of ray-finned fish, a stone loach, in the genus Schistura. This species has only ever been recorded from the Nam Leuk catchment in Laos. It was recorded in a small stream with a bed of rock and stone, it has not been recorded since 1998 but there have been no searches for it.
