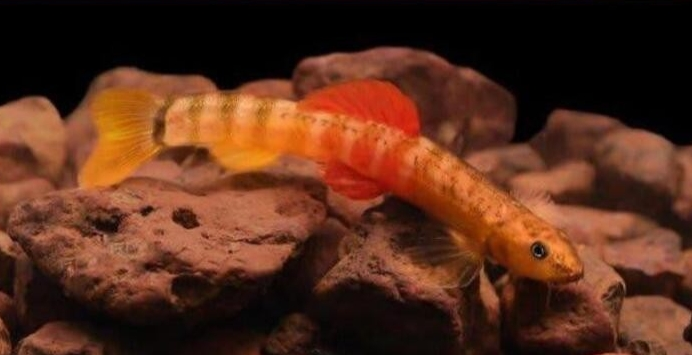
- Schistura hiranyakeshi near the source of the Hiranyakeshi river

Scientific classification
- Kingdom: Animalia
- Phylum: Chordata
- Class: Actinopterygii
- Order: Cypriniformes
- Family: Nemacheilidae
- Genus: Schistura
- Species: S. hiranyakeshi

Binomial name
- Schistura hiranyakeshi (Praveenraj, Thackeray & Balasubramanian, 2020)

= Schistura hiranyakeshi =

Species of fish

Schistura hiranyakeshi is a freshwater fish endemic to India. It was described in 2020.

== Description ==
Schistura hiranyakeshi stands out among its closely related counterparts found in peninsular, northeastern, and central India, as well as Sri Lanka, due to its distinct features such as incomplete lateral line with 6-7 pores, dorsal and caudal fins lacking spots, 9-10 wide bars on the body, crimson coloration on fins of adult males, black marks on the lower lip, and the absence of a suborbital flap or axillary pelvic lobe.

== Range ==
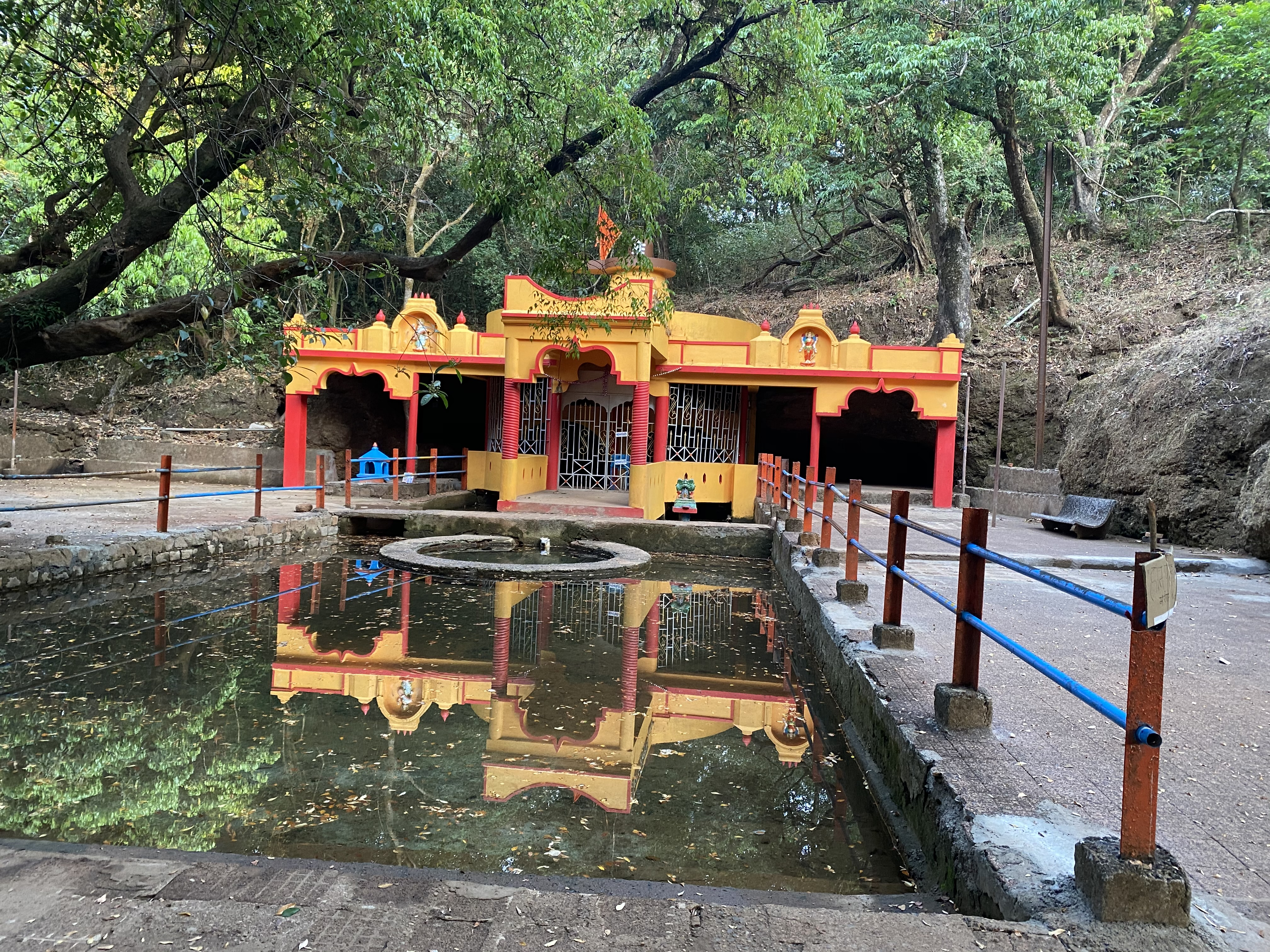
The pond of the Sri Hiranyakeshi temple, the only known locality of the species.

Schistura hiranyakeshi has only been found in large numbers in the temple pond of the Sri Hiranyakeshi temple of Amboli, near the source of the Hiranyakeshi river, the pond itself is fed by a natural spring from a laterite cave system. The area has been declared a biodiversity heritage site by the state government.

== Etymology ==
Schistura hiranyakeshi was named after the river Hiranyakeshi, which S.hiranyakeshi is found.
