= Schistura russa =

Conservation status
- Data Deficient (IUCN 3.1)

Scientific classification
- Kingdom: Animalia
- Phylum: Chordata
- Class: Actinopterygii
- Order: Cypriniformes
- Family: Nemacheilidae
- Genus: Schistura
- Species: S. russa

Binomial name
- Schistura russa Kottelat, 2000

Species of fish

Schistura russa is a species of ray-finned fish, a stone loach, in the genus Schistura. It is known from only two locations in the Nam Tha drainage system in Laos where it is found in streams with a moderate to fast flow in riffles with pebble or stone stream beds.
