= Schistura klydonion =

Scientific classification
- Kingdom: Animalia
- Phylum: Chordata
- Class: Actinopterygii
- Order: Cypriniformes
- Family: Nemacheilidae
- Genus: Schistura
- Species: S. klydonion

Binomial name
- Schistura klydonion Kottelat, 2017

Species of fish

Schistura klydonion is a species of stone loach in the genus Schistura which has only been recorded from the Xe Namnoy river on the Bolaven Plateau in southern Laos. It was described by the Belgian ichthyologist Maurice Kottelat in 2017 and does not feature in Fishbase yet. The specific name klydonion means a small wave, ripple or undulation, referring to the wavy flank stripe which lies between the row of blotches or saddles on the back and a row of bars on the lower flank.
