= Schistura latidens =

Conservation status
- Data Deficient (IUCN 3.1)

Scientific classification
- Kingdom: Animalia
- Phylum: Chordata
- Class: Actinopterygii
- Order: Cypriniformes
- Family: Nemacheilidae
- Genus: Schistura
- Species: S. latidens

Binomial name
- Schistura latidens Kottelat, 2000

Species of fish

Schistura latidens is a species of ray-finned fish, a stone loach, in the genus Schistura. It has been collected on one occasion from a single locality in 1997 from the Xe Banghiang watershed in Laos. It has not been searched for since. It was recorded in strong currents in riffles and rapids over a stony bed.
