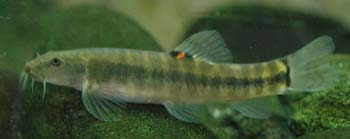

Conservation status
- Data Deficient (IUCN 3.1)

Scientific classification
- Kingdom: Animalia
- Phylum: Chordata
- Class: Actinopterygii
- Order: Cypriniformes
- Family: Nemacheilidae
- Genus: Schistura
- Species: S. waltoni

Binomial name
- Schistura waltoni (Fowler, 1937)

Synonyms
- Nemacheilus obscurus H. M. Smith, 1945

= Schistura waltoni =

Species of fish

Schistura waltoni is a species of ray-finned fish, a stone loach, in the genus Schistura. It is a species of in streams which have a moderate to fast current where it can be found in riffles, over gravel to rock beds. It is often recorded in small streams in forest, even where the water is very shallow. It occurs in the upper reaches the Chao Phraya watershed in Thailand in the rivers Mae Nam Ping, Mae Nam Wang and Mae Nam Yom. The specific name honours Joseph Walton a 19th Century contributor to the fish collection at the Academy of Natural Sciences of Philadelphia.
