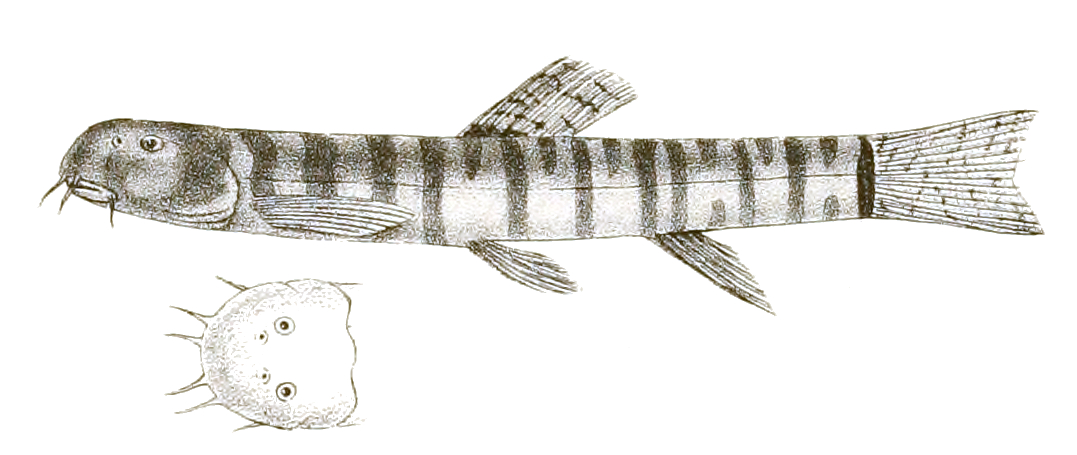

Conservation status
- Least Concern (IUCN 3.1)

Scientific classification
- Kingdom: Animalia
- Phylum: Chordata
- Class: Actinopterygii
- Order: Cypriniformes
- Family: Nemacheilidae
- Genus: Schistura
- Species: S. rupecula

Binomial name
- Schistura rupecula McClelland, 1838

Synonyms
- Nemacheilus rupecula (McClelland, 1838)

= Schistura rupecula =

Species of fish

Schistura rupecula is a species of ray-finned fish, a stone loach, in the genus Schistura. It is distributed through the eastern Himalayas from North Bengal through Bihar, Himachal Pradesh, Uttaranchal and Uttar Pradesh in India and into Nepal. Its habitat is hill streams with pebbly stream beds while adults are often found in shallow water riffles and spring pools. The specific name rupecula means "rock dweller" which was given to the species by its describer John McClelland in reference to the hill streams around Simla from where the type specimens were collected. It is the type species of the genus Schistura.
