= Schistura incerta =

Conservation status
- Data Deficient (IUCN 3.1)

Scientific classification
- Kingdom: Animalia
- Phylum: Chordata
- Class: Actinopterygii
- Order: Cypriniformes
- Family: Nemacheilidae
- Genus: Schistura
- Species: S. incerta

Binomial name
- Schistura incerta (Nichols, 1931)

Synonyms
- Barbatula incerta Nichols, 1931; Nemacheilus incertus (Nichols, 1931); Noemacheilus incertus (Nichols, 1931); Barbatula uniformis Mai, 1978; Schistura uniformis (Mai, 1978)

Species of fish

Schistura incerta is a species of ray-finned fish in the stone loach genus Schistura. It occurs in the Pearl River basin and Han Jiang in southeast China and northern Vietnam.
