= Schistura sombooni =

Conservation status
- Least Concern (IUCN 3.1)

Scientific classification
- Kingdom: Animalia
- Phylum: Chordata
- Class: Actinopterygii
- Order: Cypriniformes
- Family: Nemacheilidae
- Genus: Schistura
- Species: S. sombooni

Binomial name
- Schistura sombooni Kottelat, 1998

Species of fish

Schistura sombooni is a species of ray-finned fish, a stone loach, in the genus Schistura. It is found only in the Mekong drainage system in Laos where it occurs in stretches of streams with a relatively slow current and a gravel or sandy stream bed. The specific name honours Somboon Phetphommasouk a liaison engineer with the Nam Theun 2 Electricity Consortium of Vientiane who rendered assistance and help in the field to the describer of this species, Maurice Kottelat.
