= Schistura deansmarti =

Conservation status
- Vulnerable (IUCN 3.1)

Scientific classification
- Kingdom: Animalia
- Phylum: Chordata
- Class: Actinopterygii
- Order: Cypriniformes
- Family: Nemacheilidae
- Genus: Schistura
- Species: S. deansmarti

Binomial name
- Schistura deansmarti Vidthayanon & Kottelat, 2003

Species of fish

Schistura deansmarti is a species of ray-finned fish in the stone loach genus Schistura. It is found in cave streams in a karst landscape in the Thung Salaeng Luang National Park of Phitsanulok Province where it lives mainly on the stream beds and feeds on organic material and micro-organisms. The specific name honors the British speleologist who collected the original specimens and who works for the conservation of caves in Thailand.
