= Schistura kongphengi =

Conservation status
- Least Concern (IUCN 3.1)

Scientific classification
- Kingdom: Animalia
- Phylum: Chordata
- Class: Actinopterygii
- Order: Cypriniformes
- Family: Nemacheilidae
- Genus: Schistura
- Species: S. kongphengi

Binomial name
- Schistura kongphengi Kottelat, 1998

Species of fish

Schistura kongphengi is a species of ray-finned fish, a stone loach, in the genus Schistura, the most specious of the genera of stone loaches. It occurs in the middle and upper parts of the Nam Gnouang drainage south to the drainage of the Xe Bang Hiang in Laos and Vietnam. It has been recorded from dstreams with moderate to fast currents over substrates of gravel and sands and among riffles and rapids. The specific name honours Kongpheng Bouakhamvongsa, an official with the Department of Livestock and Veterinary of the Ministry of Agriculture of the Lao People's Democratic Republic, for the help he gave to Maurice Kottelat with his field work in Laos.
