= Schistura spiloptera =

Conservation status
- Critically Endangered (IUCN 3.1)

Scientific classification
- Kingdom: Animalia
- Phylum: Chordata
- Class: Actinopterygii
- Order: Cypriniformes
- Family: Nemacheilidae
- Genus: Schistura
- Species: S. spiloptera

Binomial name
- Schistura spiloptera (Valenciennes, 1846)

Synonyms
- Cobitis spiloptera Valenciennes, 1846; Noemacheilus spilopterus (Valenciennes, 1846); Nemacheilus pellegrini Rendahl, 1944; Schistura pellegrini (Rendahl, 1944)

Species of fish

Schistura spiloptera is a species of ray-finned fish in the genus Schistura It is found in shallow, clear, fast-flowing water over rocky bottoms in upland streams where it feeds on insect larvae, some algae and phytoplankton. It has only been recorded from central Vietnam.
