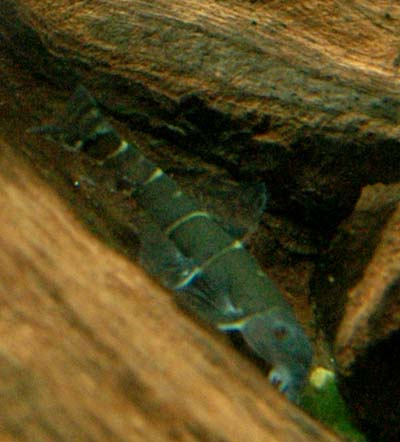

Conservation status
- Least Concern (IUCN 3.1)

Scientific classification
- Kingdom: Animalia
- Phylum: Chordata
- Class: Actinopterygii
- Division: Teleostei
- Order: Cypriniformes
- Family: Nemacheilidae
- Genus: Schistura
- Species: S. bucculenta

Binomial name
- Schistura bucculenta (H. M. Smith, 1945)

Synonyms
- Noemacheilus bucculentus Smith, 1945

= Schistura bucculenta =

Species of fish

Schistura bucculenta is a species of ray-finned fish in the stone loach genus Schistura. It has been recorded from the Mekong basin in Laos and Thailand, records elsewhere being due to misidentification. It has been recorded in streams and forest creeks which have a moderate to fast current running over a gravel to stone substrate. It is threatened by deforestation and agriculture.
