= Schistura pervagata =

Conservation status
- Least Concern (IUCN 3.1)

Scientific classification
- Kingdom: Animalia
- Phylum: Chordata
- Class: Actinopterygii
- Order: Cypriniformes
- Family: Nemacheilidae
- Genus: Schistura
- Species: S. pervagata

Binomial name
- Schistura pervagata Kottelat, 2000

Species of fish

Schistura pervagata is a species of ray-finned fish, a stone loach, in the genus Schistura. The species occurs in Laos and Vietnam in streams with moderately fast to fast currents among riffles where there are substrates which vary from gravel to stone.
