= Schistura quaesita =

Conservation status
- Data Deficient (IUCN 3.1)

Scientific classification
- Kingdom: Animalia
- Phylum: Chordata
- Class: Actinopterygii
- Order: Cypriniformes
- Family: Nemacheilidae
- Genus: Schistura
- Species: S. quaesita

Binomial name
- Schistura quaesita Kottelat, 2000

Species of fish

Schistura quaesita is a species of ray-finned fish, a stone loach, in the genus Schistura. It has only been recorded from a single locality in the Nam Ngum drainage in Laos where it was seen in streams with a moderate to fast flow, among riffles, over beds made up of gravel or stone.
