= Schistura udomritthiruji =

Conservation status
- Least Concern (IUCN 3.1)

Scientific classification
- Kingdom: Animalia
- Phylum: Chordata
- Class: Actinopterygii
- Order: Cypriniformes
- Family: Nemacheilidae
- Genus: Schistura
- Species: S. udomritthiruji

Binomial name
- Schistura udomritthiruji Bohlen & Slechtova, 2010

Species of fish

Schistura udomritthiruji is a species of stone loach, a riverine fish found in streams in southern Thailand.
