= Schistura sharavathiensis =

Conservation status
- Vulnerable (IUCN 3.1)

Scientific classification
- Kingdom: Animalia
- Phylum: Chordata
- Class: Actinopterygii
- Order: Cypriniformes
- Family: Nemacheilidae
- Genus: Schistura
- Species: S. sharavathiensis

Binomial name
- Schistura sharavathiensis Sreekantha, Gururaja, Rema Devi, Indra & Ramachandra, 2006

Species of fish

Schistura sharavathiensis, sometimes known as the Sharavati loach, is a species of freshwater fish in the family Nemacheilidae. It is endemic to the Sharavathi River basin in the central Western Ghats, India. It grows to 2.9 cm (1.1 in) standard length. It is known from a perennial, torrential hill stream with good vegetation cover at 450–480 m (1,480–1,570 ft) above sea level.
