= Schistura nasifilis =

Conservation status
- Critically endangered, possibly extinct (IUCN 3.1)

Scientific classification
- Kingdom: Animalia
- Phylum: Chordata
- Class: Actinopterygii
- Order: Cypriniformes
- Family: Nemacheilidae
- Genus: Schistura
- Species: S. nasifilis

Binomial name
- Schistura nasifilis (Pellegrin, 1936)

Synonyms
- Nemachilus spilopterus nasifilis Pellegrin, 1936

Species of fish

Schistura nasifilis is a species of ray-finned fish, a stone loach, in the genus Schistura. This species was described from two rivers in Vietnam but has not been recorded since it was first described, although it was looked for in 2000 and 2002.
