= Schistura chindwinica =

Conservation status
- Vulnerable (IUCN 3.1)

Scientific classification
- Kingdom: Animalia
- Phylum: Chordata
- Class: Actinopterygii
- Order: Cypriniformes
- Family: Nemacheilidae
- Genus: Schistura
- Species: S. chindwinica

Binomial name
- Schistura chindwinica (Tilak & Husain, 1990)

Synonyms
- Nemacheilus chindwinicus Tilak & Husain, 1990

Species of fish

Schistura chindwinica is a species of ray-finned fish in the stone loach genus Schistura. This species has been recorded from only two streams in the drainage of the Brahmaputra in Manipur. The species is threatened by siltation caused by slash and burn agriculture and the proposed building of a dam with will flood some of the waterways it occurs in.
