= Schistura obeini =

Conservation status
- Least Concern (IUCN 3.1)

Scientific classification
- Kingdom: Animalia
- Phylum: Chordata
- Class: Actinopterygii
- Order: Cypriniformes
- Family: Nemacheilidae
- Genus: Schistura
- Species: S. obeini

Binomial name
- Schistura obeini Kottelat, 1998

Species of fish

Schistura obeini is a species of ray-finned fish, a stone loach, in the genus Schistura. It has been recorded from the Nam Theun and Nam Gnouang rivers in Laos where it inhabits fast or very fast flowing water over pebble or stone beds in the headwaters of the rivers. The specific name honours François Obein of the Nam Theun 2 Electricity Consortium in Vientiane for the assistance he gave to the describer Maurice Kottelat in the field and for his organisation of logistics in the field.
