= Schistura polytaenia =

Conservation status
- Data Deficient (IUCN 3.1)

Scientific classification
- Kingdom: Animalia
- Phylum: Chordata
- Class: Actinopterygii
- Order: Cypriniformes
- Family: Nemacheilidae
- Genus: Schistura
- Species: S. polytaenia

Binomial name
- Schistura polytaenia (S. Q. Zhu, 1982)

Synonyms
- Nemacheilus polytaenia S. Q. Zhu, 1982

Species of fish

Schistura polytaenia is a species of ray-finned fish, a stone loach, in the genus Schistura. It has only been recorded at its type locality a stream in Tengchong County in Yunnan which is part of the Irrawaddy River system.
