= Schistura implicata =

Conservation status
- Data Deficient (IUCN 3.1)

Scientific classification
- Kingdom: Animalia
- Phylum: Chordata
- Class: Actinopterygii
- Order: Cypriniformes
- Family: Nemacheilidae
- Genus: Schistura
- Species: S. implicata

Binomial name
- Schistura implicata Kottelat, 2000

Species of fish

Schistura implicata is a species of ray-finned fish in the stone loach genus Schistura. It occurs in streams with gravel or stony beds and a moderate to fast current in north eastern Laos and probably also in central Vietnam.
