= Schistura globiceps =

Conservation status
- Data Deficient (IUCN 3.1)

Scientific classification
- Kingdom: Animalia
- Phylum: Chordata
- Class: Actinopterygii
- Order: Cypriniformes
- Family: Nemacheilidae
- Genus: Schistura
- Species: S. globiceps

Binomial name
- Schistura globiceps Kottelat, 2000

Species of fish

Schistura globiceps is a species of ray-finned fish in the genus Schistura. It has only been collected from a single stream in the upper Nam Tha watershed in Laos where it was found under stones in a fast flowing hill stream.
