= Schistura dalatensis =

Conservation status
- Data Deficient (IUCN 3.1)

Scientific classification
- Kingdom: Animalia
- Phylum: Chordata
- Class: Actinopterygii
- Order: Cypriniformes
- Family: Nemacheilidae
- Genus: Schistura
- Species: S. dalatensis

Binomial name
- Schistura dalatensis Freyhof & Serov, 2001

Species of fish

Schistura dalatensis is a species of ray-finned fish in the stone loach genus Schistura. It is confined to the headwaters of the Dong Nai River in Lam Dong Province, southern Vietnam where it is found in streams with stony beds.
