= Schistura curtistigma =

Scientific classification
- Kingdom: Animalia
- Phylum: Chordata
- Class: Actinopterygii
- Order: Cypriniformes
- Family: Nemacheilidae
- Genus: Schistura
- Species: S. curtistigma

Binomial name
- Schistura curtistigma Mirza & Nalbant, 1981

Species of fish

Schistura curtistigma is a species of ray-finned fish in the stone loach genus Schistura which is endemic to Pakistan.
