= Schistura minuta =

Conservation status
- Endangered (IUCN 3.1)

Scientific classification
- Kingdom: Animalia
- Phylum: Chordata
- Class: Actinopterygii
- Order: Cypriniformes
- Family: Nemacheilidae
- Genus: Schistura
- Species: S. minuta

Binomial name
- Schistura minuta Vishwanath & Shanta Kumar, 2006

Species of fish

Schistura minuta is a species of ray-finned fish, a stone loach, in the genus Schistura, a benthic species found in hill streams in the Iyei River drainage in Manipur, India.
