= Schistura antennata =

Conservation status
- Data Deficient (IUCN 3.1)

Scientific classification
- Kingdom: Animalia
- Phylum: Chordata
- Class: Actinopterygii
- Order: Cypriniformes
- Family: Nemacheilidae
- Genus: Schistura
- Species: S. antennata

Binomial name
- Schistura antennata Freyhof & Serov, 2001

Species of fish

Schistura antennata is a species of ray-finned fish in the stone loach genus Schistura. It is found in very small, steep streams in forested mountains with rocky substrates and waterfalls, although it avoids riffles and waterfalls and is restricted to reaches with a moderate flow. It has only been recorded from the headwaters of the River Lam drainage in Ha Tinh Province in central Vietnam.
