= Schistura reticulofasciata =

Conservation status
- Vulnerable (IUCN 3.1)

Scientific classification
- Kingdom: Animalia
- Phylum: Chordata
- Class: Actinopterygii
- Order: Cypriniformes
- Family: Nemacheilidae
- Genus: Schistura
- Species: S. reticulofasciata

Binomial name
- Schistura reticulofasciata (A. Singh & Bănărescu, 1982)

Synonyms
- Mesonoemacheilus reticulofasciatus Singh & Banarescu, 1982; Nemacheilus reticulofasciatus (Singh & Banarescu, 1982); Noemacheilus reticulofasciatus (Singh & Banarescu, 1982)

Species of fish

Schistura reticulofasciata is a species of ray-finned fish, a stone loach, in the genus Schistura. It is found in streams with pebble beds in the Jaintia Hills in the Indian state of Meghalaya, India, part of the drainage of the Brahmaputra. It is traded in the aquarium trade and it is thought to be collected for this trade unsustainably and may also be threatened by habitat loss caused by deforestation.
