= Schistura fasciolata =

Conservation status
- Data Deficient (IUCN 3.1)

Scientific classification
- Kingdom: Animalia
- Phylum: Chordata
- Class: Actinopterygii
- Order: Cypriniformes
- Family: Nemacheilidae
- Genus: Schistura
- Species: S. fasciolata

Binomial name
- Schistura fasciolata (Nichols & C. H. Pope, 1927)

Synonyms
- Homaloptera fasciolata Nichols & C. H. Pope, 1927; Nemachilus humilis S. Y. Lin, 1932; Schistura humilis (S. Y. Lin, 1932)

Species of fish

Schistura fasciolata is a species of ray-finned fish in the stone loach genus Schistura found fast-flowing streams in China and Vietnam. It can each a length of 12 cm (4.7 in).
