= Schistura tigrina =

Conservation status
- Endangered (IUCN 3.1)

Scientific classification
- Kingdom: Animalia
- Phylum: Chordata
- Class: Actinopterygii
- Order: Cypriniformes
- Family: Nemacheilidae
- Genus: Schistura
- Species: S. tigrina

Binomial name
- Schistura tigrina Lokeshwor & Vishwanath, 2005

Species of fish

Schistura tigrina is a species of freshwater ray-finned fish belonging to the family Nemacheilidae, the stone loaches. This species is found in karge hiilstreams with a swift current and a bed of pebbles. It is known only from the Barak River at Khunphung in the Tamenglong District in Manipur.
