= Schistura thanho =

Conservation status
- Endangered (IUCN 3.1)

Scientific classification
- Kingdom: Animalia
- Phylum: Chordata
- Class: Actinopterygii
- Order: Cypriniformes
- Family: Nemacheilidae
- Genus: Schistura
- Species: S. thanho

Binomial name
- Schistura thanho Freyhof & Serov, 2001

Species of fish

Schistura thanho is a species of ray-finned fish, a stone loach in the genus Schistura. It has only been recorded in the Vinh Thanh River drainage in Central Vietnam where it occurs in riffles with a very fast current. It is threatened by overfishing, the degradation and loss of habitat caused by dam constructions and deforestation resulting in the silting up of the streams it occurs in. The specific name is a reference to the "friendly people" of the Tha Nho ethnic community in Binh Dinh Province, Vietnam, where the type locality of this species is located.
