= Schistura novemradiata =

Conservation status
- Data Deficient (IUCN 3.1)

Scientific classification
- Kingdom: Animalia
- Phylum: Chordata
- Class: Actinopterygii
- Order: Cypriniformes
- Family: Nemacheilidae
- Genus: Schistura
- Species: S. novemradiata

Binomial name
- Schistura novemradiata Kottelat, 2000

Species of fish

Schistura novemradiata is a species of ray-finned fish, a stone loach, in the genus Schistura which has been recorded from a single locality in the upper Nam Tha watershed in Laos where it was found in a small stream over a substrate consisting of gravel and stone.
