= Schistura kohatensis =

Scientific classification
- Kingdom: Animalia
- Phylum: Chordata
- Class: Actinopterygii
- Order: Cypriniformes
- Family: Nemacheilidae
- Genus: Schistura
- Species: S. kohatensis

Binomial name
- Schistura kohatensis Mirza & Bănărescu, 1981

Species of fish

Schistura kohatensis is a species of ray-finned fish, a stone loach, in the genus Schistura.

The freshwater fish is endemic to Pakistan.

== Footnotes ==
- Froese, Rainer; Pauly, Daniel (eds.). "Schistura kohatensis". FishBase.
