= Schistura khugae =

Conservation status
- Vulnerable (IUCN 3.1)

Scientific classification
- Kingdom: Animalia
- Phylum: Chordata
- Class: Actinopterygii
- Order: Cypriniformes
- Family: Nemacheilidae
- Genus: Schistura
- Species: S. khugae

Binomial name
- Schistura khugae Vishwanath & Shanta, 2004

Species of fish

Schistura khugae is a species of ray-finned fish in the stone loach genus Schistura. It lives on the bottom of hill streams in the Khuga River, part of the Chindwin River system in Manipur, India.
