= Schistura cryptofasciata =

Scientific classification
- Kingdom: Animalia
- Phylum: Chordata
- Class: Actinopterygii
- Order: Cypriniformes
- Family: Nemacheilidae
- Genus: Schistura
- Species: S. cryptofasciata

Binomial name
- Schistura cryptofasciata X. Y. Chen, D. P. Kong & J. X. Yang, 2005

Species of fish

Schistura cryptofasciata is a species of ray-finned fish in the stone loach genus Schistura from the Nanting River in Yunnan.
