= Schistura mobbsi =

Scientific classification
- Kingdom: Animalia
- Phylum: Chordata
- Class: Actinopterygii
- Order: Cypriniformes
- Family: Nemacheilidae
- Genus: Schistura
- Species: S. mobbsi

Binomial name
- Schistura mobbsi Kottelat & Leisher, 2012

Species of fish

Schistura mobbsi is a species of troglobitic stone loach from the genus Schistura which is endemic to the Phuong Hoang Cave in Thai Nguyen Province in Vietnam. Its specific name honours Jerry Mobbs the speleologist who first discovered and explored the Phuong Hoang Cave to which this species is restricted. Schistura mobbsi has no eyes, lacks pigmentation and does not possess a lateral line, has a reduced number of fin rays, large nostrils which are placed well forward on snout, and non overlapping scales which are restricted to posterior part of flanks.
