= Schistura yingjiangensis =

Conservation status
- Data Deficient (IUCN 3.1)

Scientific classification
- Kingdom: Animalia
- Phylum: Chordata
- Class: Actinopterygii
- Order: Cypriniformes
- Family: Nemacheilidae
- Genus: Schistura
- Species: S. yingjiangensis

Binomial name
- Schistura yingjiangensis (S. Q. Zhu, 1982)

Synonyms
- Nemacheilus yingjiangensis S. Q. Zhu, 1982

Species of fish

Schistura yingjiangensis is a species of ray-finned fish in the genus Schistura, although some authorities place it in the genus Nemacheilus. The species has only been recorded from the Daying River, a tributary of the Irrawaddy River in Yingjiang County, Yunnan Province, China.
