= Schistura himachalensis =

Scientific classification
- Kingdom: Animalia
- Phylum: Chordata
- Class: Actinopterygii
- Order: Cypriniformes
- Family: Nemacheilidae
- Genus: Schistura
- Species: S. himachalensis

Binomial name
- Schistura himachalensis (Menon, 1987)

Synonyms
- Nemacheilus himachalensis Menon, 1987

Species of fish

Schistura himachalensis is a species of ray-finned fish in the genus Schistura.

It is found in India.

== Footnotes ==
- Froese, Rainer; Pauly, Daniel (eds.). "Schistura himachalensis". FishBase. June 2011 version.
