= Schistura atra =

Conservation status
- Vulnerable (IUCN 3.1)

Scientific classification
- Kingdom: Animalia
- Phylum: Chordata
- Class: Actinopterygii
- Order: Cypriniformes
- Family: Nemacheilidae
- Genus: Schistura
- Species: S. atra

Binomial name
- Schistura atra Kottelat, 1998

Species of fish

Schistura atra is a species of ray-finned fish in the stone loach genus Schistura. This species has only been recorded from the drainage systems of the Nam Theun and Nam Gnouang, tributaries of the Mekong, in Laos. It can be found in the parts of streams with deep water and fast currents where it lives among the rocks. The lower parts of the basins it occurs in have been impacted by damming and this species has probably been extirpated from these area but it continues to survive upstream of the reservoirs. The habitat of this fish is affected by deforestation, agriculture and gold mining as well as the dams.
