= Schistura procera =

Conservation status
- Least Concern (IUCN 3.1)

Scientific classification
- Kingdom: Animalia
- Phylum: Chordata
- Class: Actinopterygii
- Order: Cypriniformes
- Family: Nemacheilidae
- Genus: Schistura
- Species: S. procera

Binomial name
- Schistura procera Kottelat, 2000

Species of fish

Schistura procera is a species of ray-finned fish, a stone loach, in the genus Schistura. It has a wide distribution in the Nam Ou drainage, a tributary of the Mekong in Laos, where it occurs in a variety of flowing water habitats, from forest streams to waterfalls.
