= Schistura fascimaculata =

Scientific classification
- Kingdom: Animalia
- Phylum: Chordata
- Class: Actinopterygii
- Order: Cypriniformes
- Family: Nemacheilidae
- Genus: Schistura
- Species: S. fascimaculata

Binomial name
- Schistura fascimaculata Mirza & Nalbant, 1981

Species of fish

Schistura fascimaculata is a species of ray-finned fish in the most diverse genus of the stone loach family Nemacheilidae, the genus Schistura. It is found in Pakistan.
