= Schistura magnifluvis =

Conservation status
- Least Concern (IUCN 3.1)

Scientific classification
- Kingdom: Animalia
- Phylum: Chordata
- Class: Actinopterygii
- Order: Cypriniformes
- Family: Nemacheilidae
- Genus: Schistura
- Species: S. magnifluvis

Binomial name
- Schistura magnifluvis Kottelat, 1990

Species of fish

Schistura magnifluvis is a species of ray-finned fish, a stone loach, in the genus Schistura. It is found in the middle Mekong basin in Thailand and Laos, from the Nam Heung basin to the Xe Don system, it probably occurs in Cambodia too. It is found in streams and rivers, including the nmain channel of the Mekong, in stretches of moderate to fast current over a variety of substrates from mud to stone.
