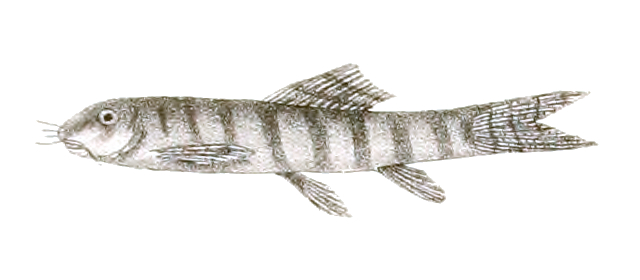

Conservation status
- Data Deficient (IUCN 3.1)

Scientific classification
- Kingdom: Animalia
- Phylum: Chordata
- Class: Actinopterygii
- Order: Cypriniformes
- Family: Nemacheilidae
- Genus: Schistura
- Species: S. cincticauda

Binomial name
- Schistura cincticauda (Blyth, 1860)

Synonyms
- Cobitis cincticauda Blyth, 1860; Nemacheilus cincticauda Blyth, 1860; Noemacheilus cincticauda Blyth, 1860

= Schistura cincticauda =

Species of fish

Schistura cincticauda is a species of ray-finned fish in the stone loach genus Schistura. It has been recorded from a tributary of the Salween River in Thailand, Myanmar and Laos.
