= Schistura pseudofasciolata =

Scientific classification
- Kingdom: Animalia
- Phylum: Chordata
- Class: Actinopterygii
- Order: Cypriniformes
- Family: Nemacheilidae
- Genus: Schistura
- Species: S. pseudofasciolata

Binomial name
- Schistura pseudofasciolata W. Zhou & G. H. Cui, 1993

Species of fish

Schistura pseudofasciolata is a species of stone loach, a freshwater fish in the family Nemacheilidae. It has only been recorded from its type locality which is the Canyu River, part of the Yangtze River drainage in Huidong County in Sichuan, China.
