= Schistura rosammai =

Scientific classification
- Kingdom: Animalia
- Phylum: Chordata
- Class: Actinopterygii
- Division: Teleostei
- Order: Cypriniformes
- Family: Nemacheilidae
- Genus: Schistura
- Species: S. rosammai

Binomial name
- Schistura rosammai (N. Sen, 2009)

Synonyms
- Aborichthys rosammai Sen, 2009

Species of fish

Schistura rosammai is a species of stone loach from India.
