= Schistura namboensis =

Conservation status
- Least Concern (IUCN 3.1)

Scientific classification
- Kingdom: Animalia
- Phylum: Chordata
- Class: Actinopterygii
- Order: Cypriniformes
- Family: Nemacheilidae
- Genus: Schistura
- Species: S. namboensis

Binomial name
- Schistura namboensis Freyhof & Serov, 2001

Species of fish

Schistura namboensis is a species of ray-finned fish, a stone loach, in the genus Schistura. It normally occurs in the rapids and riffles of medium-sized rivers and streams but it can also be found in reaches with a slow current and sandy substrate. This species appears to have some resistance to organic pollution and occurs in streams flowing through settlements, and is often the last fish species to remain in such streams. It is found in the coastal drainages in southern and central Vietnam and also in Laos in some rivers which rise there before flowing into Vietnam.
