= Schistura sigillata =

Conservation status
- Data Deficient (IUCN 3.1)

Scientific classification
- Kingdom: Animalia
- Phylum: Chordata
- Class: Actinopterygii
- Order: Cypriniformes
- Family: Nemacheilidae
- Genus: Schistura
- Species: S. sigillata

Binomial name
- Schistura sigillata Kottelat, 2000

Species of fish

Schistura sigillata is a species of ray-finned fish, a stone loach, in the genus Schistura from Laos.
