= Schistura carletoni =

Scientific classification
- Kingdom: Animalia
- Phylum: Chordata
- Class: Actinopterygii
- Order: Cypriniformes
- Family: Nemacheilidae
- Genus: Schistura
- Species: S. carletoni

Binomial name
- Schistura carletoni (Fowler, 1924)

Synonyms
- Nemacheilus carletoni Fowler, 1924; Noemacheilus carletoni (Fowler, 1924)

Species of fish

Schistura carletoni is a species of ray-finned fish in the stone loach genus Schistura. It is found in the Beas River basin of Himachal Pradesh India, located in small streams with a fast current in shallow water over gravel or rocky beds.
