= Schistura callidora =

Scientific classification
- Kingdom: Animalia
- Phylum: Chordata
- Class: Actinopterygii
- Order: Cypriniformes
- Family: Nemacheilidae
- Genus: Schistura
- Species: S. callidora

Binomial name
- Schistura callidora Bohlen & Šlechtová, 2011

Species of fish

Schistura callidora is a species of ray-finned fish in the stone loach genus Schistura. It was first found in the Myitnge River drainage, Irrawaddy basin in Myanmar. It is distinguished by possessing dark bars on its body, being much thinner in its anterior half; a high dorsal crest on the caudal peduncle; the number of dorsal-fin rays; and its lateral line which reaches behind the base of the anal fin.
