= Schistura dubia =

Conservation status
- Data Deficient (IUCN 3.1)

Scientific classification
- Kingdom: Animalia
- Phylum: Chordata
- Class: Actinopterygii
- Order: Cypriniformes
- Family: Nemacheilidae
- Genus: Schistura
- Species: S. dubia

Binomial name
- Schistura dubia Kottelat, 1990

Species of fish

Schistura dubia is a species of ray-finned fish in Schistura, the largest genus of stone loaches, from Thailand.
