= Schistura bachmaensis =

Conservation status
- Data Deficient (IUCN 3.1)

Scientific classification
- Kingdom: Animalia
- Phylum: Chordata
- Class: Actinopterygii
- Order: Cypriniformes
- Family: Nemacheilidae
- Genus: Schistura
- Species: S. bachmaensis

Binomial name
- Schistura bachmaensis Freyhof & Serov, 2001

Species of fish

Schistura bachmaensis is a species of ray-finned fish in the stone loach genus Schistura. It has been only been recorded in a single small stream with fast running water and boulders in Thua Thien Province of Vietnam.
