= Schistura striata =

Scientific classification
- Kingdom: Animalia
- Phylum: Chordata
- Class: Actinopterygii
- Order: Cypriniformes
- Family: Nemacheilidae
- Genus: Schistura
- Species: S. striata

Binomial name
- Schistura striata (F. Day, 1867)

Species of fish

Schistura striata is a species of stone loach endemic to India where it occurs in Kerala and Karnataka. This fish grows to a length of 5 centimetres (2.0 in) SL.
