= Schistura indawgyiana =

Scientific classification
- Kingdom: Animalia
- Phylum: Chordata
- Class: Actinopterygii
- Order: Cypriniformes
- Family: Nemacheilidae
- Genus: Schistura
- Species: S. indawgyiana

Binomial name
- Schistura indawgyiana Kottelat, 2017

Species of fish

Schistura ndawgyiana is a species of stone loach in the genus Schistura which has only been recorded from a single tributary of Lake Indawgyi in Kachin State, Myanmar. It was described by the Belgian ichthyologist Maurice Kottelat in 2017 and does not feature in Fishbase yet.
