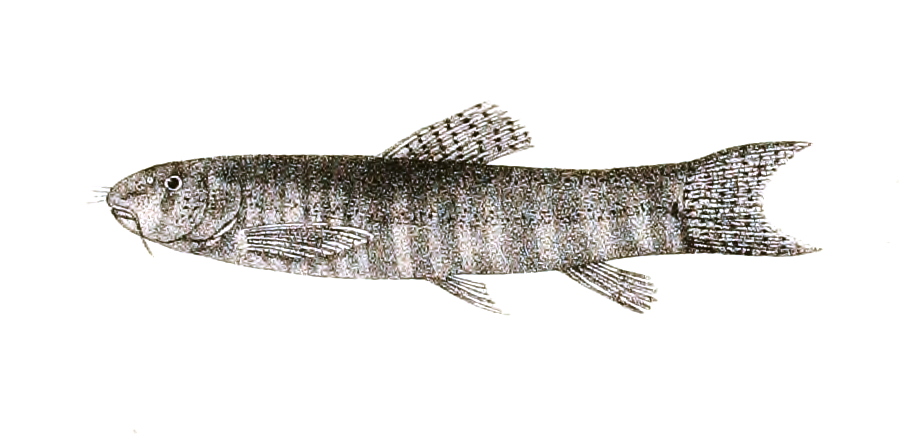

Conservation status
- Least Concern (IUCN 3.1)

Scientific classification
- Kingdom: Animalia
- Phylum: Chordata
- Class: Actinopterygii
- Order: Cypriniformes
- Family: Nemacheilidae
- Genus: Schistura
- Species: S. beavani

Binomial name
- Schistura beavani (Günther, 1868)

Synonyms
- Nemacheilus beavani Günther, 1868

= Schistura beavani =

Species of fish

Schistura beavani, the creek loach, is a species of ray-finned fish in the stone loach genus Schistura. It is a widely distributed species, especially in the Ganges where it can be found in the Indian states of Meghalaya, Uttaranchal, Uttar Pradesh and West Bengal and Nepal, it has also been reported from Bangladesh and its presence in Meghalaya need to be confirmed. Adults are found in fast flowing, clear streams with a pebbly substrate.
