= Schistura singhi =

Conservation status
- Vulnerable (IUCN 3.1)

Scientific classification
- Kingdom: Animalia
- Phylum: Chordata
- Class: Actinopterygii
- Order: Cypriniformes
- Family: Nemacheilidae
- Genus: Schistura
- Species: S. singhi

Binomial name
- Schistura singhi (Menon, 1987)

Synonyms
- Nemacheilus singhi Menon, 1987

Species of fish

Schistura singhi is a species of ray-finned fish in the stone loach genus Schistura, although some authorities place it in the genus Nemacheilus. This species has only been recorded from a single locality in Nagaland, India.
