= Schistura nagodiensis =

Conservation status
- Endangered (IUCN 3.1)

Scientific classification
- Kingdom: Animalia
- Phylum: Chordata
- Class: Actinopterygii
- Division: Teleostei
- Order: Cypriniformes
- Family: Nemacheilidae
- Genus: Schistura
- Species: S. nagodiensis

Binomial name
- Schistura nagodiensis Sreekantha, Gururaja, Rema Devi, Indra & Ramachandra, 2006

Species of fish

Schistura nagodiensis, sometimes known as the Nagodi loach, is a species of freshwater fish in the family Nemacheilidae. It is endemic to the Sharavathi River basin in the central Western Ghats, India, where it is known from Nagodihole, its type locality. It grows to 2.8 cm (1.1 in) standard length. It is known from torrential hill streams with good vegetation cover at 600–800 m (2,000–2,600 ft) above sea level.
