= Schistura colossa =

Scientific classification
- Kingdom: Animalia
- Phylum: Chordata
- Class: Actinopterygii
- Order: Cypriniformes
- Family: Nemacheilidae
- Genus: Schistura
- Species: S. colossa

Binomial name
- Schistura colossa Kottelat, 2017

Species of fish

Schistura colossa is a species of stone loach in the genus Schistura which has been recorded from the Xe Pian, Xe Set and Houay Champi rivers on the Bolaven Plateau in southern Laos. It was described by the Belgian ichthyologist Maurice Kottelat in 2017 and does not feature in Fishbase yet. The specific name colossa means giant, this species is one of the largest species of southeast Asian stone loaches.
