= Schistura caudofurca =

Conservation status
- Least Concern (IUCN 3.1)

Scientific classification
- Kingdom: Animalia
- Phylum: Chordata
- Class: Actinopterygii
- Order: Cypriniformes
- Family: Nemacheilidae
- Genus: Schistura
- Species: S. caudofurca

Binomial name
- Schistura caudofurca (Đ. Y. Mai, 1978)

Synonyms
- Barbatula caudofurca Mai, 1978; Nemacheilus laterivittatus Zhu & Wang, 1985; Schistura laterivittata (Zhu & Wang, 1985); Paracobitis hagiangensis V. H. Nguyễn, 2005; Schistura hagiangensis (V. H. Nguyễn, 2005)

Species of fish

Schistura caudofurca is a species of ray-finned fish in the stone loach genus Schistura. It occurs in the Red River system of southern China and northern Viet Nam, and also the Nam Mat, Nam Xam and Nam Ma river systems in Laos. It prefers streams with a moderate to fast flow and gravel or rock substrates.
