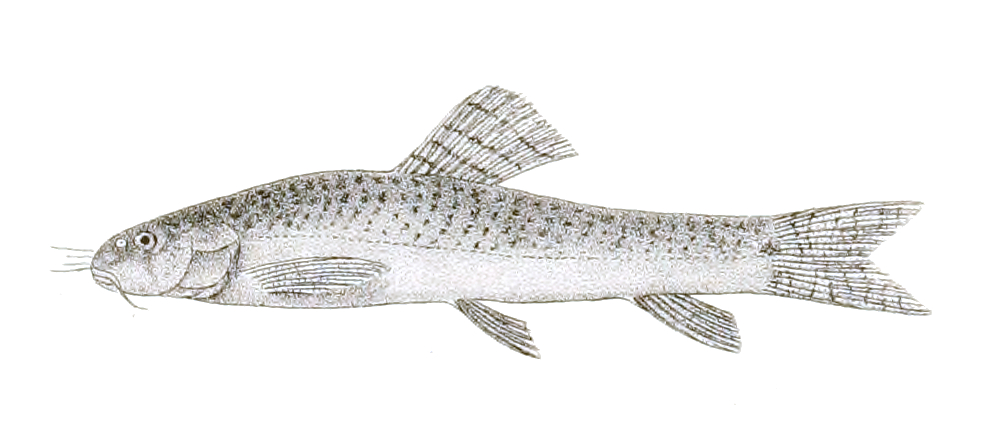

Conservation status
- Least Concern (IUCN 3.1)

Scientific classification
- Kingdom: Animalia
- Phylum: Chordata
- Class: Actinopterygii
- Order: Cypriniformes
- Family: Nemacheilidae
- Genus: Schistura
- Species: S. semiarmata

Binomial name
- Schistura semiarmata F. Day, 1867

Synonyms
- Nemacheilus semiarmatus Day, 1867; Noemacheilus semiarmatus (Day, 1867); Schistura semiarmatus (Day, 1867)

= Schistura semiarmata =

Species of stone loach

Schistura semiarmata is a species of stone loach in the genus Schistura. It is found in the Indian states of Karnataka, Kerala, and Tamil Nadu (the Bhavani River, the Seegoor River, and Billicul Lake) and, at least based on some sources, in Pakistan. It grows to 5.6 cm (2.2 in) SL. It is a very common species inhabiting high altitude streams with hard bottom (sand, gravel and cobble stones as the major substrates). It is sometimes used as an aquarium fish.
