= Schistura nagaensis =

Conservation status
- Vulnerable (IUCN 3.1)

Scientific classification
- Kingdom: Animalia
- Phylum: Chordata
- Class: Actinopterygii
- Order: Cypriniformes
- Family: Nemacheilidae
- Genus: Schistura
- Species: S. nagaensis

Binomial name
- Schistura nagaensis (Menon, 1987)

Synonyms
- Noemacheilus nagaensis Menon, 1987; Nemacheilus nagaensis (Menon, 1987)

Species of fish

Schistura nagaensis is a species of ray-finned fish, a stone loach, in the genus Schistura. It is a benthic species which is found in hill streams with a fast currents over a gravel substrate. It occurs in the Tizu River in the Chindwin basin of Manipur and Nagaland, it may also occur in the Tizu River in Myanmar. Slash and burn cultivation within the drainage of the Tizu has contributed to a decline in quality of hill stream habitats and resultant threats to fish populations which are also threatened by destructive fishing techniques including the use of explosives and poisons.
