= Schistura amplizona =

Conservation status
- Data Deficient (IUCN 3.1)

Scientific classification
- Kingdom: Animalia
- Phylum: Chordata
- Class: Actinopterygii
- Order: Cypriniformes
- Family: Nemacheilidae
- Genus: Schistura
- Species: S. amplizona

Binomial name
- Schistura amplizona Kottelat, 2000

Species of fish

Schistura amplizona is a species of ray-finned fish in the stone loach genus Schistura. It been recorded from only two river basins, the Nam Tha and Nam Youan, in northern Laos, of these the Nam Youam flows to Xishuangbanna in Yunnan, China and specimens of this species have been collected very close to the border so this species may occur in Yunnan. Its preferred habitat appears to be streams with a moderate flow and a bed of rock or pebbles. This species is harvested by local subsistence fisheries but the main potential threats are alteration of natural water courses through deforestation and agriculture.
