= Schistura susannae =

Conservation status
- Vulnerable (IUCN 3.1)

Scientific classification
- Kingdom: Animalia
- Phylum: Chordata
- Class: Actinopterygii
- Order: Cypriniformes
- Family: Nemacheilidae
- Genus: Schistura
- Species: S. susannae

Binomial name
- Schistura susannae Freyhof & Serov, 2001

Species of fish

Schistura susannae is a species of ray-finned fish, a stone loach, in the genus Schistura. It occurs in small mountain streams which have waterfalls and small riffles, where it is usually observed in pools with gravel or sandy bottoms. It has only been found to occur in the Mong Mo river, a small coastal drainage, in central Vietnam. The specific name honors Susanne Klähr, for the help she gave to Maurice Kottelat in his field work.
