= Schistura bairdi =

Conservation status
- Endangered (IUCN 3.1)

Scientific classification
- Kingdom: Animalia
- Phylum: Chordata
- Class: Actinopterygii
- Order: Cypriniformes
- Family: Nemacheilidae
- Genus: Schistura
- Species: S. bairdi

Binomial name
- Schistura bairdi Kottelat, 2000

Species of fish

Schistura bairdi is a species of ray-finned fish in the genus Schistura.

This species has so far only been found in the mainstream Mekong River in southern Laos in the Khone Falls area, which is on the border with Stung Treng and Preah Vihear provinces in northeastern Cambodia.

== Etymology ==
This fish is named after Professor Ian G. Baird, Department of Geography, University of Wisconsin-Madison.
