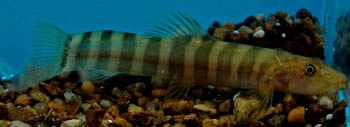

Conservation status
- Data Deficient (IUCN 3.1)

Scientific classification
- Kingdom: Animalia
- Phylum: Chordata
- Class: Actinopterygii
- Order: Cypriniformes
- Family: Nemacheilidae
- Genus: Schistura
- Species: S. alticrista

Binomial name
- Schistura alticrista Kottelat, 1990

= Schistura alticrista =

Species of fish

Schistura alticrista is a species of ray-finned fish in the genus Schistura. This stone loach has only been recorded in the basin of the Nam Mae Yuam, a tributary of the Salween River in Mae Hong Son Province, north west Thailand. It has been reported that this species has been recorded in the Salween mainstream near the inflow of the Nam Mae Yuam. The habitat from which the species has been collected is small streams over a substrate of pebbles. This fish is harvested by subsistence fisheries. Species in the genus Schistura are omnivores although the majority of their diet is animal matter such as zooplankton, insects, worms and crustaceans with small amounts of plant material and detritus. S. alticrista is occasionally traded in the aquarium trade.
