= Schistura punctifasciata =

Conservation status
- Data Deficient (IUCN 3.1)

Scientific classification
- Kingdom: Animalia
- Phylum: Chordata
- Class: Actinopterygii
- Order: Cypriniformes
- Family: Nemacheilidae
- Genus: Schistura
- Species: S. punctifasciata

Binomial name
- Schistura punctifasciata Kottelat, 1998

Species of fish

Schistura punctifasciata is a species of ray-finned fish, a stone loach, in the genus Schistura. It is found only in Laos where it is found only downstream of the subterranean section of the Xe Bangfai, inhabiting still water as well as moderately fast flowing streams over gravel substrates, with clear water.
