= Schistura xhatensis =

Conservation status
- Data Deficient (IUCN 3.1)

Scientific classification
- Kingdom: Animalia
- Phylum: Chordata
- Class: Actinopterygii
- Order: Cypriniformes
- Family: Nemacheilidae
- Genus: Schistura
- Species: S. xhatensis

Binomial name
- Schistura xhatensis Kottelat, 2000

Species of fish

Schistura xhatensis is a species of ray-finned fish, a stone loach, in the genus Schistura. It has been recorded once, in 1999, on the Nam Xhat River, in the Nam Khan drainage, a tributary of the Mekong in Laos.
