= Schistura maculosa =

Scientific classification
- Kingdom: Animalia
- Phylum: Chordata
- Class: Actinopterygii
- Order: Cypriniformes
- Family: Nemacheilidae
- Genus: Schistura
- Species: S. maculosa

Binomial name
- Schistura maculosa Lalronunga, Lalnuntluanga & Lalramliana, 2013

Species of fish

Schistura maculosa, the spotted stone loach, is a species of ray-finned fish in the family Nemacheilidae described from Tuingo and Pharsih Rivers, tributaries of Tuivai River (Barak drainage), Mizoram, India.

== Etymology ==
The specific name is derived from the Latin for ‘spotted’, referring to the numerous black spots on the caudal and dorsal fins. It is used as an adjective.

== Description ==
Dorsal-fin with 2 or 3 simple and 7½ branched rays; pectoral-fin with 11-13 rays; pelvic-fin with 8 rays; anal-fin with 3 simple and 5½ branched rays; caudal-fin branched rays 8+8.
