= Schistura moeiensis =

Conservation status
- Data Deficient (IUCN 3.1)

Scientific classification
- Kingdom: Animalia
- Phylum: Chordata
- Class: Actinopterygii
- Order: Cypriniformes
- Family: Nemacheilidae
- Genus: Schistura
- Species: S. moeiensis

Binomial name
- Schistura moeiensis Kottelat, 1990

Species of fish

Schistura moeiensis is a species of ray-finned fish, a stone loach, in the genus Schistura. It is found in the Mae Nam Noi drainage system, a tributary of the Salween, the Mae Nam Noi forms the border between Thailand and Myanmar. It has been recorded from streams which have a moderate to fast current, in riffles, over beds consisting of gravel to stone.
