= Schistura aizawlensis =

Scientific classification
- Kingdom: Animalia
- Phylum: Chordata
- Class: Actinopterygii
- Division: Teleostei
- Order: Cypriniformes
- Family: Nemacheilidae
- Genus: Schistura
- Species: S. aizawlensis

Binomial name
- Schistura aizawlensis Lalramliana, 2012

Species of fish

Schistura aizawlensis is a species of ray-finned fish in the stone loach genus Schistura. It occurs in Muthi River, a tributary of Tuirial River, Mizoram, Northeast India. It may inhabit moderate or strongly-flowing stream with a substrate of gravel and rocks and a water temperature of 22 to 28 °C over the course of the day.

== Etymology ==
Aizlawensis, named after Aizawl, the capital city of Mizoram state, India, where the type locality of the species is located.

== Description ==
The species distinguish from its congeners in having 5-7 regular broad bars, dorsal side of pectoral fin with small tubercles, very low or no adipose crest on dorsal and ventral side of caudal peduncle, intestine without loop behind the stomach, and several morphometric and meristic characters.
