= Schistura larketensis =

Scientific classification
- Kingdom: Animalia
- Phylum: Chordata
- Class: Actinopterygii
- Division: Teleostei
- Order: Cypriniformes
- Family: Nemacheilidae
- Genus: Schistura
- Species: S. larketensis

Binomial name
- Schistura larketensis Choudhury et al., 2017

Species of fish

Schistura larketensis is a species of cavefish in the family Nemacheilidae. It is found in the East Jaintia Hills district in the Indian state of Meghalaya and is named after the Larket village, where the fish was found inside a cave.
