= Schistura malaisei =

Conservation status
- Least Concern (IUCN 3.1)

Scientific classification
- Kingdom: Animalia
- Phylum: Chordata
- Class: Actinopterygii
- Order: Cypriniformes
- Family: Nemacheilidae
- Genus: Schistura
- Species: S. malaisei

Binomial name
- Schistura malaisei Kottelat, 1990

Species of fish

Schistura malaisei is a species of ray-finned fish, a stone loach, in the genus Schistura. It is a benthic species of fast-flow, well-oxygenated, cool water in the Irrawaddy River basin of Myanmar and Yunnan. It can be found in the aquarium trade and over exploitation may threaten local populations. The specific name honours Swedish entomologist René Malaise (1892-1978), who collected type and in whose fish collections from Burma (1933-1935), including specimens from some remote localities, Maurice Kottelat found the type specimen from which he described the species.
