= Schistura kodaguensis =

Conservation status
- Vulnerable (IUCN 3.1)

Scientific classification
- Kingdom: Animalia
- Phylum: Chordata
- Class: Actinopterygii
- Order: Cypriniformes
- Family: Nemacheilidae
- Genus: Schistura
- Species: S. kodaguensis

Binomial name
- Schistura kodaguensis (Menon, 1987)

Synonyms
- Nemacheilus kodaguensis Menon, 1987

Species of fish

Schistura kodaguensis is a species of ray-finned fish, a stone loach, in the genus Schistura. This species has been recorded from a single stream with a swift current and gravel bottom in the Cauvery River system in Karnataka, India. The specific name is derived from Kodagu District where the type specimen was collected.
