= Schistura bolavenensis =

Conservation status
- Endangered (IUCN 3.1)

Scientific classification
- Kingdom: Animalia
- Phylum: Chordata
- Class: Actinopterygii
- Order: Cypriniformes
- Family: Nemacheilidae
- Genus: Schistura
- Species: S. bolavenensis

Binomial name
- Schistura bolavenensis Kottelat, 2000

Species of fish

Schistura bolavenensis is a species of ray-finned fish in the stone leach genus Schistura. It is found in the Bolaven Plateau in Laos where it occurs in clear rocky streams at altitudes of 800–1,200 m which form tributaries of the Xe Kong and Xe Don rivers where it feeds on insects. It is threatened by proposals to construct dams and from the mining of bauxite on the Bolovan Plateau.
