= Schistura huongensis =

Conservation status
- Data Deficient (IUCN 3.1)

Scientific classification
- Kingdom: Animalia
- Phylum: Chordata
- Class: Actinopterygii
- Order: Cypriniformes
- Family: Nemacheilidae
- Genus: Schistura
- Species: S. huongensis

Binomial name
- Schistura huongensis Freyhof & Serov, 2001

Species of fish

Schistura huongensis is a species of ray-finned fish in the most speciose genus of the stone loach family Nemacheilidae, Schistura. It has been recorded from the drainage basins of the Perfume River and Cam Lo in central Vietnam. It can be found in the slack water upstream of riffles in medium-sized mountain rivers and streams with a fast current.
