= Schistura anambarensis =

Scientific classification
- Kingdom: Animalia
- Phylum: Chordata
- Class: Actinopterygii
- Order: Cypriniformes
- Family: Nemacheilidae
- Genus: Schistura
- Species: S. anambarensis

Binomial name
- Schistura anambarensis (Mirza & Bănărescu, 1970)

Synonyms
- Noemacheilus anambarensis Mirza & Banarescu, 1970

Species of fish

Schistura anambarensis is a species of ray-finned fish in the stone loach genus Schistura which is endemic to Pakistan.
