= Schistura robertsi =

Conservation status
- Least Concern (IUCN 3.1)

Scientific classification
- Kingdom: Animalia
- Phylum: Chordata
- Class: Actinopterygii
- Order: Cypriniformes
- Family: Nemacheilidae
- Genus: Schistura
- Species: S. robertsi

Binomial name
- Schistura robertsi Kottelat, 1990

Species of fish

Schistura robertsi is a species of ray-finned fish, a stone loach, in the genus Schistura. It is found on the western side of the Malay Peninsula from Tanintharyi Region in southern Myanmar to Trang Province in Peninsular Thailand and on Langkawi Island in Malaysia. It occurs in streams and hill creeks, inhabiting stretches with stream beds made up of gravel and small stones and it is threatened by developments for tourism, agriculture, livestock farming, residential property and commercial property. The specific name honours the American ichthyologist Tyson R. Roberts who collected most of the original type series which were used by Maurice Kottelat to describe the species.
