= Schistura macrolepis =

Scientific classification
- Kingdom: Animalia
- Phylum: Chordata
- Class: Actinopterygii
- Order: Cypriniformes
- Family: Nemacheilidae
- Genus: Schistura
- Species: S. macrolepis

Binomial name
- Schistura macrolepis Mirza & Bănărescu, 1981

Species of fish

Schistura macrolepis is a species of ray-finned fish, a stone loach in the genus Schistura from Pakistan.
