= Schistura oedipus =

Conservation status
- Vulnerable (IUCN 3.1)

Scientific classification
- Kingdom: Animalia
- Phylum: Chordata
- Class: Actinopterygii
- Order: Cypriniformes
- Family: Nemacheilidae
- Genus: Schistura
- Species: S. oedipus

Binomial name
- Schistura oedipus (Kottelat, 1988)

Synonyms
- Noemacheilus oedipus Kottelat, 1988

Species of fish

Schistura oedipus is a species of troglobitic stone loach endemic to caves in the Pang Mapha karst formation in Mae Hongson Province in Thailand. It is only found in very fast flowing cave streams where it feeds on micro-organism and organic matter. This species is highly sensitive to disturbance, changes in water quality and hydrography. The specific name oedipus refers to the mythical Ancient Greek king of Thebes, Oedipus who tore out his own eyes, this species has degenerate eyes.
