= Schistura cataracta =

Conservation status
- Least Concern (IUCN 3.1)

Scientific classification
- Kingdom: Animalia
- Phylum: Chordata
- Class: Actinopterygii
- Order: Cypriniformes
- Family: Nemacheilidae
- Genus: Schistura
- Species: S. cataracta

Binomial name
- Schistura cataracta Kottelat, 1998

Species of fish

Schistura cataracta is a species of ray-finned fish in the stone loach genus Schistura. It occurs in the Nam Theun and Nam Gnouang, in the Mekong basin of Laos. It prefers stretches of rivers with fast current and a stony or rocky substrate, but it does occasionally occur over gravel or sandy substrates. It can also be found in reservoirs, albeit at low densities and dams are the biggest threat to this species.
