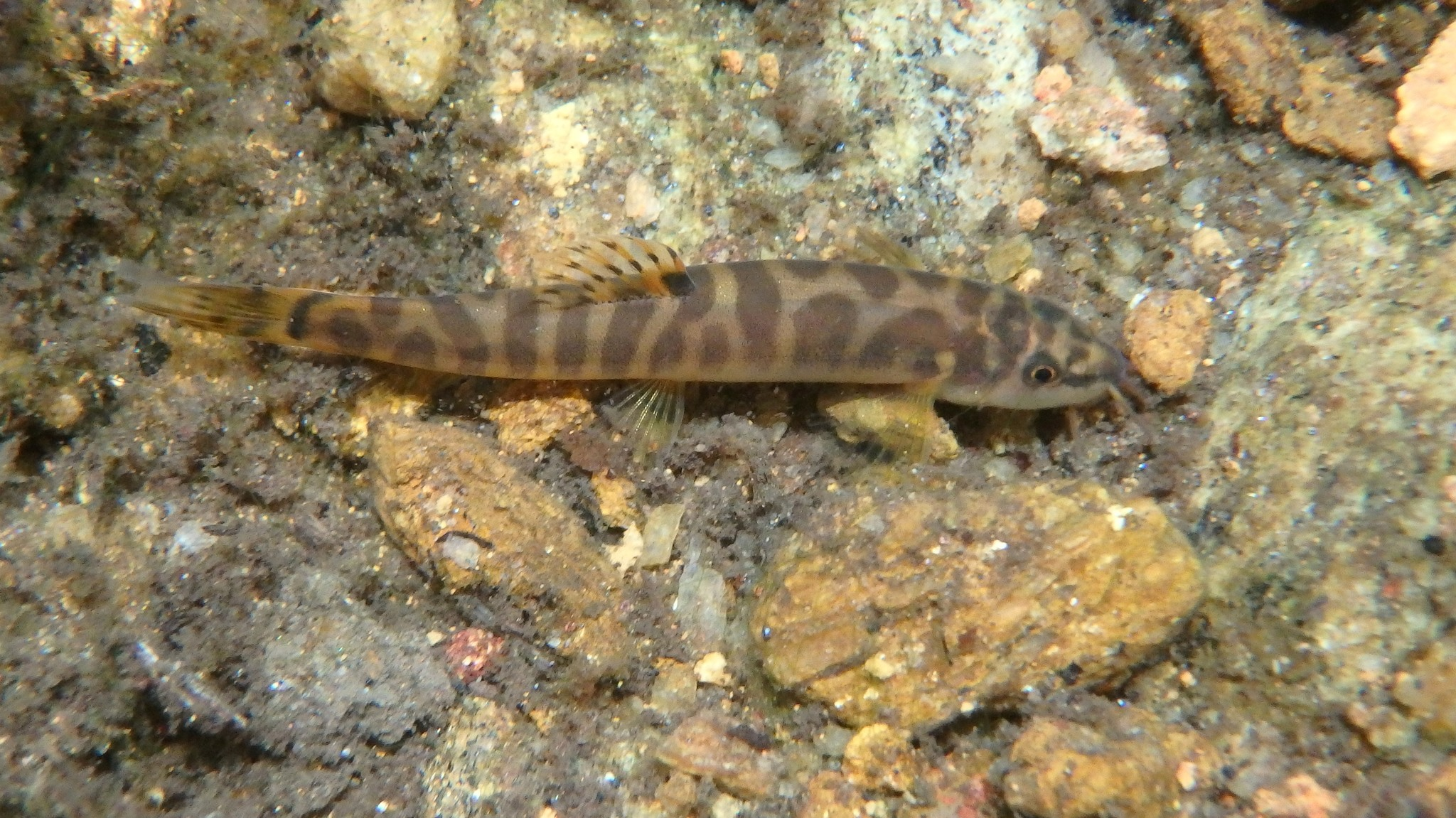

Scientific classification
- Kingdom: Animalia
- Phylum: Chordata
- Class: Actinopterygii
- Order: Cypriniformes
- Family: Nemacheilidae
- Genus: Schistura
- Species: S. notostigma

Binomial name
- Schistura notostigma (Bleeker, 1863)

Synonyms
- Nemacheilus notostigma Bleeker, 1863

= Schistura notostigma =

Species of fish

Schistura notostigma, the spotback loach, is a species of ray-finned fish in the genus Schistura, distributed in peninsula of India and Sri Lanka. Until 2017, it was thought to be the only species of Schistura stone loach found in Sri Lanka before a new species Schistura madhavai, was described.

== Description ==
Schistura notostigma can be identified by the presence of 6 to 7 wide brown post-dorsal bars, emarginated caudal fin, incomplete lateral line, pelvic fin, which is adpressed always surpassing the anal fin.
