= Schistura madhavai =

Scientific classification
- Kingdom: Animalia
- Phylum: Chordata
- Class: Actinopterygii
- Order: Cypriniformes
- Family: Nemacheilidae
- Genus: Schistura
- Species: S. madhavai

Binomial name
- Schistura madhavai Sudasinghe, 2017

Species of fish

Schistura madhavai, is a species of ray-finned fish in the genus Schistura, newly distributed from Sri Lanka. It is the second species of Schistura stone loach described from Sri Lanka, the other being the widely distributed native species Schistura notostigma.

== Etymology ==
The specific name madhavai is named in honor of Prof. Madhava Meegaskumbura, who is a renowned taxonomist of Sri Lanka, and mentor of the researcher Hiranya Sudasinghe, who described the species.

== Description ==
S. madhavai can be identified by the presence of 8 to 9 wide brown post-dorsal bars, black bar at caudal fin, incomplete lateral line, pelvic fin, which is adpressed marginally reach the anal fin and axillary pelvic lobe is absent.

== Ecology ==
The species was discovered in a stream in Suriyakanda from a two meter wide area. The stream the S. madhavi was discovered in flows through a tea plantation in hill country at 1,000, above sea level. It is the fifth species of loach found in Sri Lanka, including the Sri Lanka banded mountain loach S. notostigma and a third stone loach, the tiger loach Paracanthocobitis urophthalma . The other two Sri Lankan loaches are members of the family Cobitidae, the true loaches.
