= Schistura arifi =

Scientific classification
- Kingdom: Animalia
- Phylum: Chordata
- Class: Actinopterygii
- Order: Cypriniformes
- Family: Nemacheilidae
- Genus: Schistura
- Species: S. arifi

Binomial name
- Schistura arifi Mirza & Bănărescu, 1981

Synonyms
- Nemacheilus arifi (Mirza & Bănărescu, 1981)

Species of fish

Schistura arifi is a species of ray-finned fish in the stone loach genus Schistura which is endemic to Pakistan.
