= Schistura nicholsi =

Conservation status
- Least Concern (IUCN 3.1)

Scientific classification
- Kingdom: Animalia
- Phylum: Chordata
- Class: Actinopterygii
- Order: Cypriniformes
- Family: Nemacheilidae
- Genus: Schistura
- Species: S. nicholsi

Binomial name
- Schistura nicholsi (H. M. Smith, 1933)

Synonyms
- Nemacheilus nicholsi Smith, 1933

Species of fish

Schistura nicholsi is a species of ray-finned fish, a stone loach, in the genus Schistura. It is found in the Mekong basin of north eastern Thailand, Laos and it is also likely to be found in Cambodia. It occurs in shallow riffles with moderate to fast flows. Human modification of the rivers' morphology through such activities as logging and agriculture are affecting this species range. However, its distribution covers a wide geographic range and it is assessed as Least Concern by the IUCN.

The specific name honors John Treadwell Nichols (1883–1958), who was curator of fishes at the American Museum of Natural History and who made an important contribution to the ichthyology of China, and especially to the knowledge of loaches.
