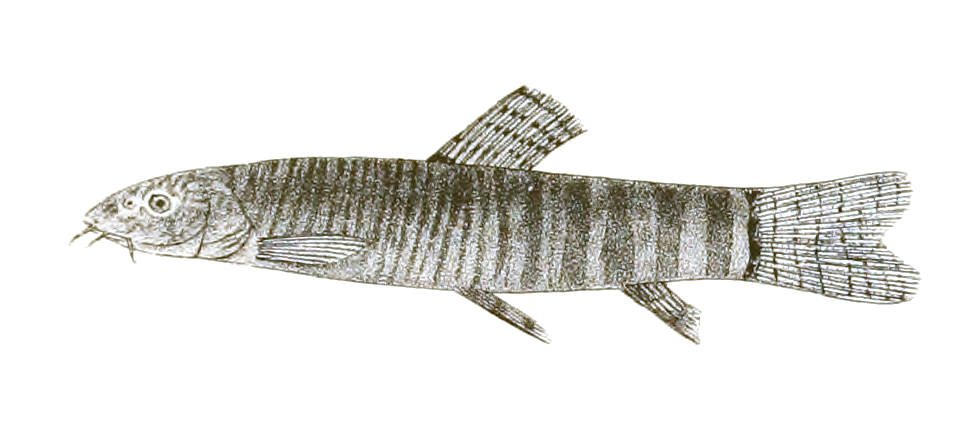

Conservation status
- Least Concern (IUCN 3.1)

Scientific classification
- Kingdom: Animalia
- Phylum: Chordata
- Class: Actinopterygii
- Order: Cypriniformes
- Family: Nemacheilidae
- Genus: Schistura
- Species: S. multifasciata

Binomial name
- Schistura multifasciata (Day, 1878)

Synonyms
- Nemacheilus multifasciatus Day, 1878; Noemacheilus multifasciatus (Day, 1878)

= Schistura multifasciata =

Species of fish

Schistura multifasciata is a species of ray-finned fish, a stone loach in the genus Schistura. It is found in the eastern Himalayas, from the Teesta River, through the base of the Nepal Himalaya, as far as the Ghaghara and Sharda River drainages, where it lives on the gravel bottoms of fast flowing hill streams.
