= Schistura pertica =

Conservation status
- Data Deficient (IUCN 3.1)

Scientific classification
- Kingdom: Animalia
- Phylum: Chordata
- Class: Actinopterygii
- Order: Cypriniformes
- Family: Nemacheilidae
- Genus: Schistura
- Species: S. pertica

Binomial name
- Schistura pertica Kottelat, 2000

Species of fish

Schistura pertica is a species of ray-finned fish, a stone loach, in the genus Schistura. It has only been recorded once, in 1997, from a very small stream entering the Nam Ou River, downstream of the Muang Khoa River in northern Laos, it is expected to occur elsewhere in the Nam Ou drainage. It was observed in streams with a moderate to fast current, in riffles, over beds varying from gravel to stone
