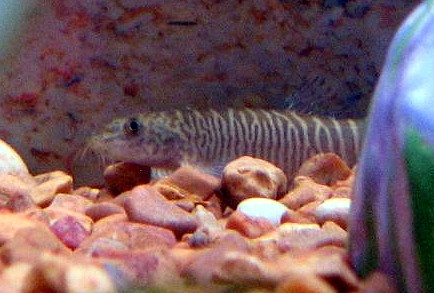
- Schistura mahnerti

Scientific classification
- Kingdom: Animalia
- Phylum: Chordata
- Class: Actinopterygii
- Division: Teleostei
- Order: Cypriniformes
- Family: Nemacheilidae
- Genus: Schistura; McClelland, 1838

Type species
- Cobitis rupecula McClelland, 1838

Synonyms
- Longischistura Bănărescu & Nalbant, 1995

= Schistura =

Genus of fishes

Schistura is a genus of fish in the stone loach family Nemacheilidae native to the streams and rivers of the southern and eastern Asia. Some of these species are troglobitic.

== Species ==
There are currently over 200 recognized species in this genus:

- Schistura acuticephala (Hora, 1929)
- Schistura afasciata Mirza & Bănărescu, 1981
- Schistura aizawlensis Lal Ramliana, 2012
- Schistura alboguttata Cao & E. Zhang, 2018
- Schistura alticrista Kottelat, 1990
- Schistura altipedunculata (Bănărescu & Nalbant, 1968)
- Schistura altuscauda F.-M. Chen, Myint, L. Chu & X. Y. Chen, 2020
- Schistura amplizona Kottelat, 2000
- Schistura anambarensis (Mirza & Bănărescu, 1970)
- Schistura andrewi Solo, Lal Ramliana, Lalronunga & Lalnun Tluanga, 2014
- Schistura antennata Freyhof & Serov, 2001
- Schistura aramis Kottelat, 2000
- Schistura arifi Mirza & Bănărescu, 1981
- Schistura ataranensis Dvořák, Bohlen, Kottelat & Šlechtová, 2023
- Schistura athos Kottelat, 2000
- Schistura atra Kottelat, 1998
- Schistura aurantiaca Plongsesthee, Page & Beamish, 2011
- Schistura bachmaensis Freyhof & Serov, 2001
- Schistura bairdi Kottelat, 2000
- Schistura balteata (Rendahl (de), 1948)
- Schistura beavani (Günther, 1868) (Creek loach)
- Schistura bhimachari (Hora, 1937)
- Schistura bolavenensis Kottelat, 2000
- Schistura breviceps (H. M. Smith, 1945)
- Schistura bucculenta (H. M. Smith, 1945)
- Schistura callichroma (S. Q. Zhu & S. H. Wang, 1985)
- Schistura callidora Bohlen & Šlechtová, 2011
- Schistura carbonaria Freyhof & Serov, 2001
- Schistura carletoni (Fowler, 1924)
- Schistura cataracta Kottelat, 1998
- Schistura caudofurca (Đ. Y. Mai, 1978)
- Schistura chapaensis (Rendahl, 1944)
- Schistura chindwinica (Tilak & Husain, 1990)
- Schistura cincticauda (Blyth, 1860)
- Schistura clatrata Kottelat, 2000
- Schistura colossa Kottelat, 2017
- Schistura conirostris (S. Q. Zhu, 1982)
- Schistura coruscans Kottelat, 2000
- Schistura crassa Kottelat, 2017
- Schistura crocotula Plongsesthee, Kottelat & Beamish, 2013
- Schistura cryptofasciata X. Y. Chen, D. P. Kong & J. X. Yang, 2005
- Schistura curtistigma Mirza & Nalbant, 1981
- Schistura dalatensis Freyhof & Serov, 2001
- Schistura daubentoni Kottelat, 1990
- Schistura dayi (Hora, 1935)
- Schistura deansmarti Vidthayanon & Kottelat, 2003
- Schistura defectiva Kottelat, 2000
- Schistura denisoni (Day 1867)
- Schistura desmotes (Fowler, 1934)
- Schistura devdevi (Hora, 1935)
- Schistura diminuta Ou, Montaña, Winemiller & Conway, 2011
- Schistura disparizona W. Zhou & Kottelat, 2005
- Schistura doonensis (Tilak & Husain, 1977)
- Schistura dorsizona Kottelat, 1998
- Schistura dubia Kottelat, 1990
- Schistura ephelis Kottelat, 2000
- Schistura epixenos Kottelat, 2017
- Schistura falamensis M.-F. Chen, Myint, L. Chu & X.-Y. Chen, 2020
- Schistura fasciata Lokeshwor & Vishwanath, 2011
- Schistura fascimaculata Mirza & Nalbant, 1981
- Schistura fasciolata (Nichols & C. H. Pope, 1927)
- Schistura ferruginea Lokeshwor & Vishwanath, 2013
- Schistura finis Kottelat, 2000
- Schistura gangetica (Menon, 1987)
- Schistura globiceps Kottelat, 2000
- Schistura harnaiensis (Mirza & Nalbant, 1969)
- Schistura hartli Dvořák, Bohlen, Kottelat & Šlechtová, 2023
- Schistura himachalensis (Menon, 1987)
- Schistura hingi (Herre, 1934)
- Schistura hiranyakeshi Praveenraj, Thackeray & Balasubramanian, 2020
- Schistura horai (Menon, 1952)
- Schistura huapingensis (Y. F. Wu & C. Z. Wu, 1992)
- Schistura huongensis Freyhof & Serov, 2001
- Schistura hypsiura Bohlen, Šlechtová & Udomritthiruj, 2014
- Schistura imitator Kottelat, 2000
- Schistura implicata Kottelat, 2000
- Schistura incerta (Nichols, 1931)
- Schistura indawgyiana Kottelat, 2017
- Schistura irregularis Kottelat, 2000
- Schistura jarutanini Kottelat, 1990
- Schistura kampucheensis Bohlen, Petrtýl, Chaloupková & Borin, 2016
- Schistura kangjupkhulensis (Hora, 1921)
- Schistura kangrae (Menon, 1952)
- Schistura kaysonei Vidthayanon & Jaruthanin, 2002
- Schistura kengtungensis (Fowler, 1936)
- Schistura khamtanhi Kottelat, 2000
- Schistura khugae Vishwanath & Shanta, 2004
- Schistura klydonion Kottelat, 2017
- Schistura kodaguensis (Menon, 1987)
- Schistura kohatensis Mirza & Bănărescu, 1981
- Schistura kohchangensis (H. M. Smith, 1933)
- Schistura koladynensis Lokeshwor & Vishwanath, 2012
- Schistura kongphengi Kottelat, 1998
- Schistura kontumensis Freyhof & Serov, 2001
- Schistura kottelati Ho, Hoang & Ngo, 2018
- Schistura kuehnei Dvořák, Bohlen, Kottelat & Šlechtová, 2023
- Schistura larketensis Choudhury, Mukhim, Basumatary, Warbah & Sarma, 2017
- Schistura laterimaculata Kottelat, 1990
- Schistura latidens Kottelat, 2000
- Schistura latifasciata (S. Q. Zhu & S. H. Wang, 1985)
- Schistura leukensis Kottelat, 2000
- Schistura liyaiensis Lokeshwor & Vishwanath, 2014
- Schistura machensis (Mirza & Nalbant 1970)
- Schistura macrocephalus Kottelat, 2000
- Schistura macrolepis Mirza & Bănărescu, 1981
- Schistura macrotaenia (J. X. Yang, 1990)
- Schistura maculosa Lalronunga, Lalnun Tluanga & Lal Ramliana, 2013
- Schistura madhavai Sudasinghe, 2017 (Madhava's stream loach)
- Schistura magnifluvis Kottelat, 1990
- Schistura mahnerti Kottelat, 1990
- Schistura malaisei Kottelat, 1990
- Schistura manipurensis (Banawari Lal Chaudhuri, 1912)
- Schistura megalodon Endruweit, 2014
- Schistura melarancia Kottelat, 2000
- Schistura menanensis (H. M. Smith 1945)
- Schistura minuta Vishwanath & Shanta Kumar, 2006
- Schistura mizoramensis Lalramliana, Lalronunga, Vanramliana & Lalthanzara, 2014
- Schistura mobbsi Kottelat & Leisher, 2012
- Schistura moeiensis Kottelat, 1990
- Schistura mukambbikaensis (Menon, 1987)
- Schistura multifasciata (Day, 1878)
- Schistura musa Kottelat, 2017
- Schistura myaekanbawensis Dvořák, Bohlen, Kottelat & Šlechtová, 2023
- Schistura myrmekia (Fowler, 1935)
- Schistura nagaensis (Menon, 1987)
- Schistura nagodiensis Sreekantha, Gururaja, Rema Devi, T. J. Indra & T. V. Ramachandra, 2006
- Schistura namboensis Freyhof & Serov, 2001
- Schistura nasifilis (Pellegrin 1936)
- Schistura nebeshwari Lokeshwor & Vishwanath, 2013
- Schistura nicholsi (H. M. Smith, 1933)
- Schistura nilgiriensis (Menon, 1987)
- Schistura nomi Kottelat, 2000
- Schistura notostigma (Bleeker 1863) (Spotback loach)
- Schistura novemradiata Kottelat, 2000
- Schistura nubigena Kottelat, 2017
- Schistura nudidorsum Kottelat, 1998
- Schistura obeini Kottelat, 1998
- Schistura obliquofascia Lokeshwor, Barat, Sati, Darshan, Vishwanath & Mahanta, 2012
- Schistura oedipus (Kottelat, 1988)
- Schistura palma Kottelat, 2023
- Schistura pantherina Page, Plongsesthee & Randall, 2012
- Schistura papulifera Kottelat, Harries & Proudlove, 2007
- Schistura paraxena Endruweit, 2017
- Schistura paucifasciata (Hora, 1929)
- Schistura paucireticulata Lokeshwor, Vishwanath & Kosygin, 2013
- Schistura pawensis Bohlen & Šlechtová, 2013
- Schistura peninsulae Dvořák, Bohlen, Kottelat & Šlechtová, 2023
- Schistura personata Kottelat, 2000
- Schistura pertica Kottelat, 2000
- Schistura pervagata Kottelat, 2000
- Schistura phamhringi Shangningam, Lokeshwor & Vishwanath, 2014
- Schistura polytaenia (S.-Q. Zhu, 1982)
- Schistura porocephala Lokeshwor & Vishwanath, 2013
- Schistura porthos Kottelat, 2000
- Schistura procera Kottelat, 2000
- Schistura pseudofasciolata W. Zhou & G. H. Cui, 1993
- Schistura psittacula Freyhof & Serov, 2001
- Schistura pumatensis X. K. Nguyễn & H. D. Nguyễn, 2007
- Schistura puncticeps Bohlen & Šlechtová, 2013
- Schistura punctifasciata Kottelat, 1998
- Schistura quaesita Kottelat,2000
- Schistura quasimodo Kottelat, 2000
- Schistura rajasthanica (D. S. Mathur & G. M. Yazdani, 1971)
- Schistura rara (S. Q. Zhu & W. X. Cao, 1987)
- Schistura rebuw H. Choudhury, Dey, Bharali, D. Sarma & Vishwanath, 2019
- Schistura reidi (H. M. Smith, 1945)
- Schistura reticulata Vishwanath & Nebeshwar Sharma, 2004
- Schistura reticulofasciata (A. Singh & Bănărescu, 1982)
- Schistura rikiki Kottelat, 2000
- Schistura robertsi Kottelat, 1990
- Schistura rosammai (N. Sen, 2009)
- Schistura rubrimaculata Bohlen & Šlechtová, 2013
- Schistura rupecula McClelland, 1838
- Schistura russa Kottelat, 2000
- Schistura scaturigina McClelland, 1839
- Schistura schultzi H. M. (Smith, 1945)
- Schistura scripta Sudasinghe, 2018
- Schistura scyphovecteta Lokeshwor & Vishwanath, 2013
- Schistura semiarmata (Day, 1867)
- Schistura sertata Kottelat, 2000
- Schistura sexcauda (Fowler, 1937)
- Schistura shadiwalensis Mirza & Nalbant, 1981
- Schistura sharavathiensis Sreekantha, Gururaja, Rema Devi, Indra & Ramachandra, 2006
- Schistura shebbearei (Hora, 1935)
- Schistura sigillata Kottelat, 2000
- Schistura sijuensis (Menon, 1987)
- Schistura sikmaiensis (Hora, 1921)
- Schistura similis Kottelat, 1990
- Schistura singhi (Menon, 1987)
- Schistura sirindhornae Suvarnaraksha, 2015 (Crown scaly stream loach)
- Schistura sokolovi Freyhof & Serov, 2001
- Schistura sombooni Kottelat, 1998
- Schistura sonarengaensis Mukhim, Sarma, Choudhury, Chandran, Das, Singh, Warbah, Sarkar & Sarma, 2024
- Schistura spekuli Kottelat, 2004
- Schistura spiesi Vidthayanon & Kottelat, 2003
- Schistura spiloptera (Valenciennes, 1846)
- Schistura spilota (Fowler, 1934)
- Schistura stala Endruweit, 2017
- Schistura striata (Day, 1867)
- Schistura susannae Freyhof & Serov, 2001
- Schistura syngkai Choudhury, Mukhim, Dey, Warbah & Sarma, 2019
- Schistura systomos Kottelat, 2017
- Schistura tamduongensis T. H. Nguyễn, X. K. Nguyễn & H. D. Nguyễn, 2009
- Schistura tenebrosa Kangrang Page & Beamish, 2012
- Schistura tenura Kottelat, 2000
- Schistura thanho Freyhof & Serov, 2001
- Schistura tigrina Vishwanath & Nebeshwar Sharma, 2005
- Schistura tirapensis Kottelat, 1990
- Schistura titan Kottelat, 2017
- Schistura tizardi Kottelat, 2000
- Schistura trilineata (Nguyen, Nguyen & Hoang, 2010)
- Schistura tubulinaris Kottelat, 1998
- Schistura udomritthiruji Bohlen & Šlechtová, 2010
- Schistura vinciguerrae (Hora, 1935)
- Schistura waltoni (Fowler, 1937)
- Schistura wanlainensis Kottelat, 2017
- Schistura xhatensis Kottelat, 2000
- Schistura yersini Freyhof & Serov, 2001
- Schistura yingjiangensis (Z.-Q. Zhu, 1982)
- Schistura zonata McClelland, 1839

== See also ==
- Sgouros, Katherine; Lawrence M. Page; Sarah A. Orlofske; Robert C. Jadin (2019). "A Revised Molecular Phylogeny Reveals Polyphyly in Schistura (Teleostei: Cypriniformes: Nemacheilidae)". Zootaxa. 4559 (2): 349–362. doi:10.11646/zootaxa.4559.2.8. PMID 30791021.
