= Schistura scaturigina =

Conservation status
- Least Concern (IUCN 3.1)

Scientific classification
- Kingdom: Animalia
- Phylum: Chordata
- Class: Actinopterygii
- Order: Cypriniformes
- Family: Nemacheilidae
- Genus: Schistura
- Species: S. scaturigina

Binomial name
- Schistura scaturigina McClelland, 1839

Synonyms
- Cobitis scaturigina (McClelland, 1839); Nemacheilus scaturigina (McClelland, 1839); Noemacheilus scaturigina (McClelland, 1839); Nemacheilus mugah Day, 1869; Nemacheilus shebbearei Hora, 1935

Species of fish

Schistura scaturigina is a species of ray-finned fish, a stone loach, in the genus Schistura. It is found in high altitude streams with gravelly bottoms in the upper Ganges basin in Nepal and the Indian states of Bihar, West Bengal, Jharkhand, Sikkim and Uttar Pradesh.
