= Sekong River =

River in Vietnam, Laos and Cambodia

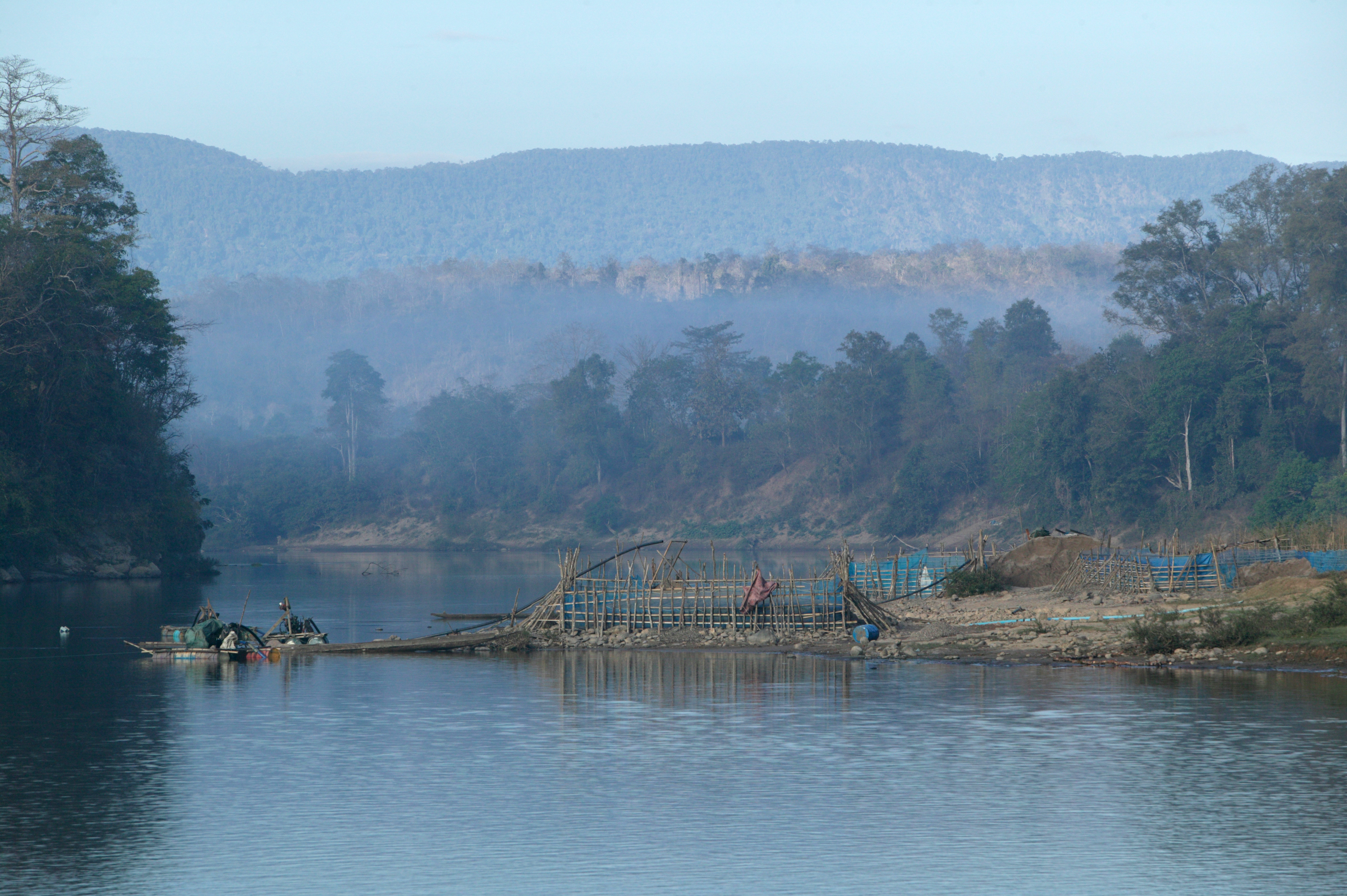

Location
- Country: Vietnam, Laos, Cambodia

Physical characteristics
- Source
  - location: Huế, Vietnam
- Mouth
  - location: Stung Treng, Cambodia
- Length: 480 km (300 mi)

Basin features
- River system: Mekong river

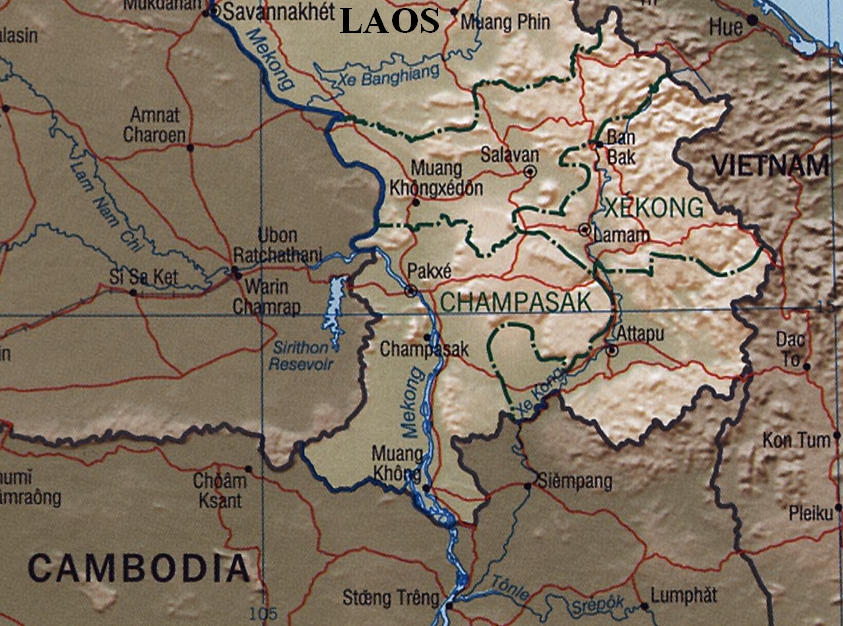
The Sekong river

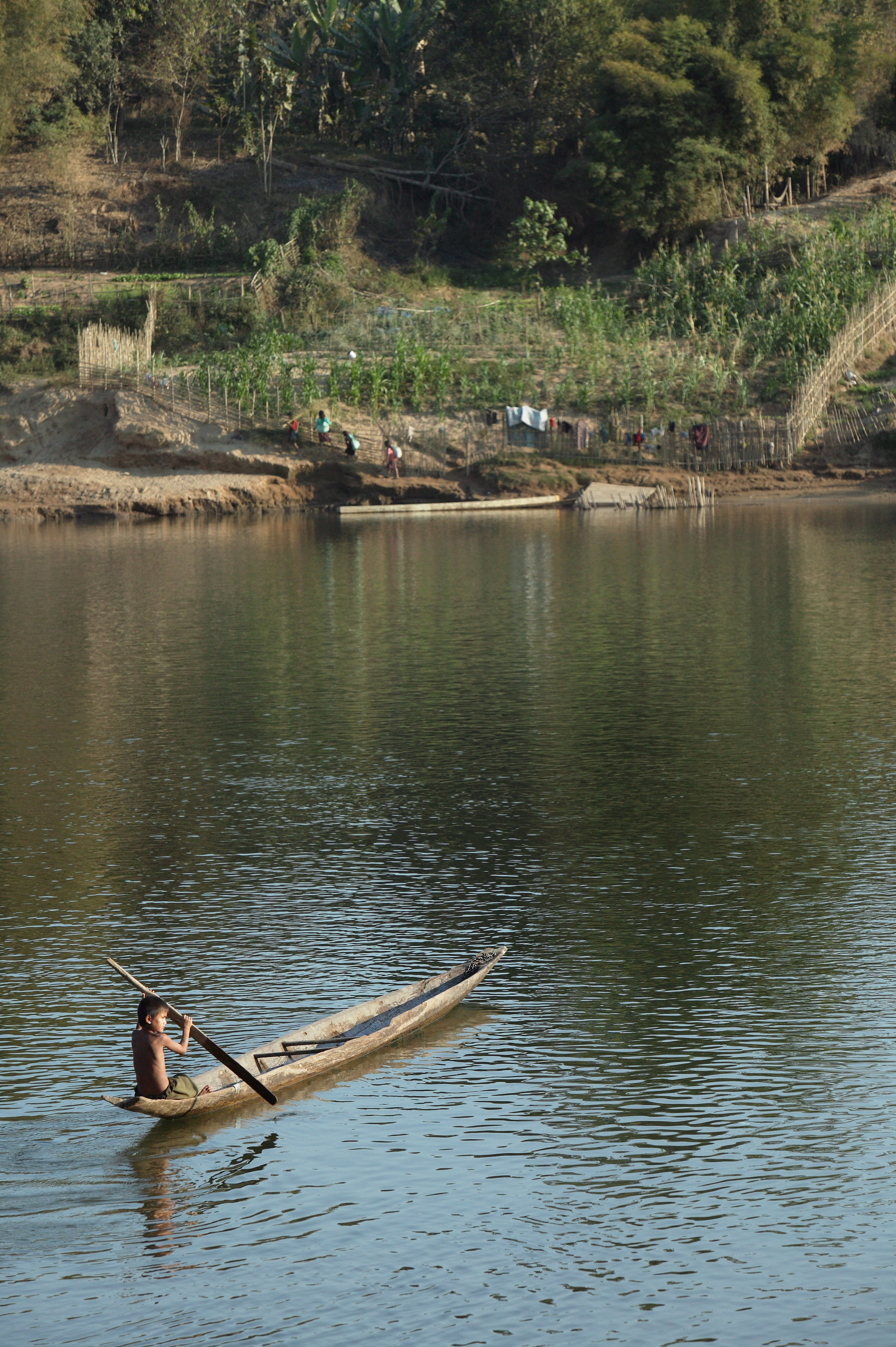
A small Laotian boy paddles a boat on the Sekong river

The Sekong River (Vietnamese: Sông Sê Kông, Khmer: ទន្លេកុង), is a river in Mainland Southeast Asia and an important tributary of the Mekong river.

== Course ==
The river originates in Huế in Central Vietnam and flows 480 kilometres (300 mi) through southern Laos and northeastern Cambodia. It joins the Tonlé San near the Stung Treng town of Cambodia, just 5 miles upstream from the confluence of the Tonlé San and the Mekong river.

Part of its course forms the international boundary between Laos and Cambodia.

== Tributaries ==
- Xe Kaman River
