= Mbuna =

Common name for several species of fish

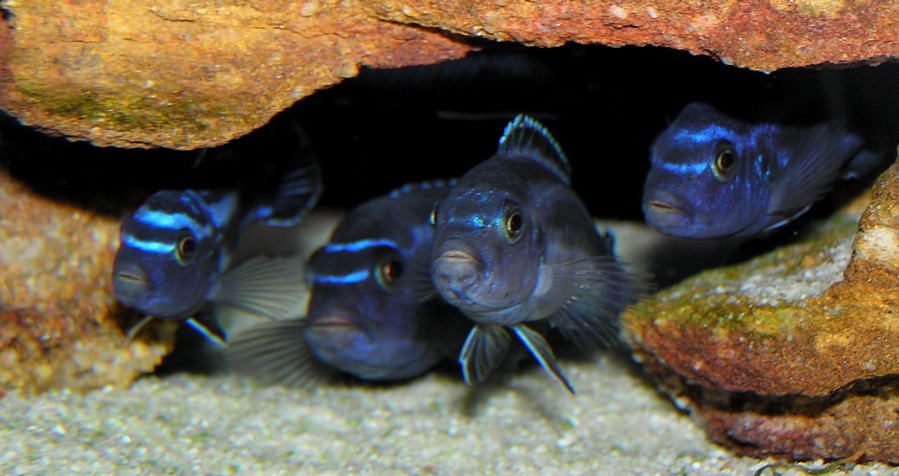
Melanochromis cyaneorhabdos displaying behaviour typical of mbuna

Mbuna (pronounced boo-nuh (the "m" is silent), though some pronounce it umm-boo-nuh ) is the common name for a large group of African cichlids from Lake Malawi, and are members of the haplochromine tribe within the family Cichlidae. The name mbuna means "rockfish" in the language of the Tonga people of Malawi. As the name implies, most mbuna are cichlids that live among the piles of rocks and along the rocky shores of Lake Malawi, as opposed to the utaka, cichlids that live in the open water or on sandy shores or soft substrates. Some species of mbuna are highly sexually dimorphic, although many are not. Almost all of the cichlid species of Lake Malawi, including mbuna and non mbuna such as the utaka, are believed to have descended from one or a very few species that became isolated in the lake. With rising water levels, new habitats could be colonized and the many isolated rocky outcrops allowed new mbuna species to form. Their striking colors, intriguing behavioral characteristics, and relative hardiness make them very popular despite their unique demands for the home aquarist.

== Mbuna in aquaria ==
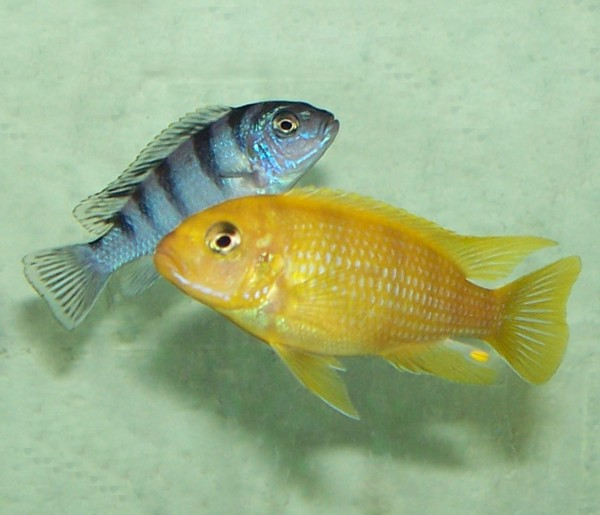
While many haplochromines tend to be colorful in males though dull in females, both sexes of mbuna often have striking coloration. This is a pair of kenyi cichlids, Maylandia lombardoi.

These cichlids are some of the most colorful freshwater fish for the home aquarium. Mbuna are very aggressive and territorial fish, they are not suitable for beginner fishkeepers. A suitable aquarium setting includes many rocks, adequate filtration, caves, and hiding places; plants may be uprooted, so they are best avoided, but a small number will work well in the aquarium. One of these is Java fern, which may become the object of mbuna aggression, but will not be eaten due to an undesirable taste.

== Social behavior ==
Mbuna exhibit strong social behavior and establish a clearly visible social hierarchy including well-defined and enforced territories. A dominant male maintains a spherical territory, only allowing females to enter this territory for breeding purposes. Overcrowding helps spread out the aggression caused by these territorial conflicts. They, like Astatotilapia burtoni, are maternal mouthbrooders and breed readily in good conditions.

== Water parameters ==
All species from Lake Malawi thrive in the temperature range of 77–84 °F. pH 7.5–8.4 is ideal with an almost pristine (near 0 ppm) ammonia and ammonium nitrite content.

== Notable mbuna cichlids ==
Many mbuna cichlids are regularly stocked and sold by pet shops. Some of the most common ones are the Bumblebee Cichlid or Hornet Cichlid (Pseudotropheus crabro), Golden Cichlid (Melanochromis auratus), Electric Yellow or Yellow Lab Cichlid (Labidochromis caeruleus), Red Zebra Cichlid (Maylandia estherae), Blue Zebra Cichlid (Maylandia callainos), and Blue Johannii Melanochromis cyaneorhabdos. Many of these species are considered to have large territorial needs and aggressively defend these territories. Cichlids belonging to any of the genera listed below are considered mbuna.

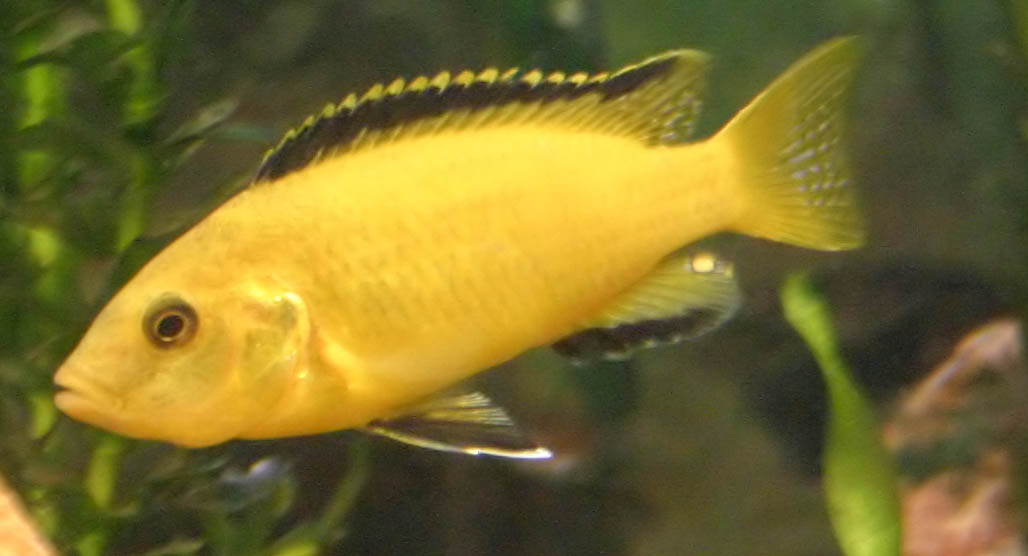
An electric yellow cichlid, Labidochromis caeruleus.

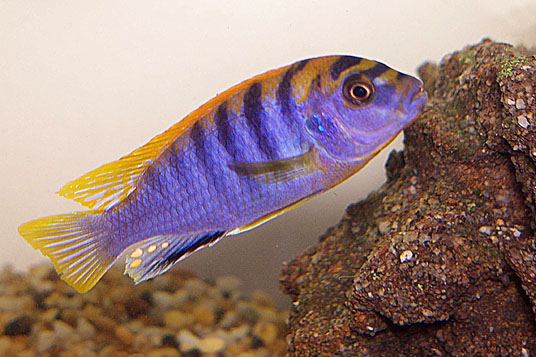
Labidochromis sp.

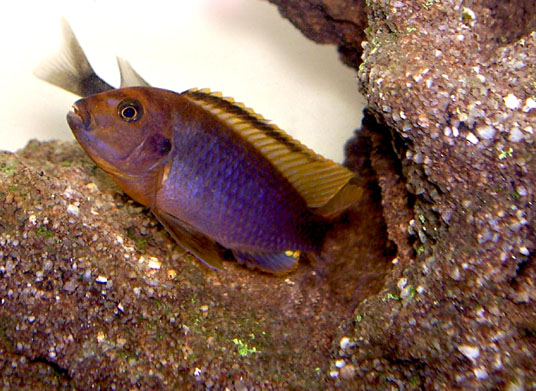
Rusty cichlid, Iodotropheus sprengerae

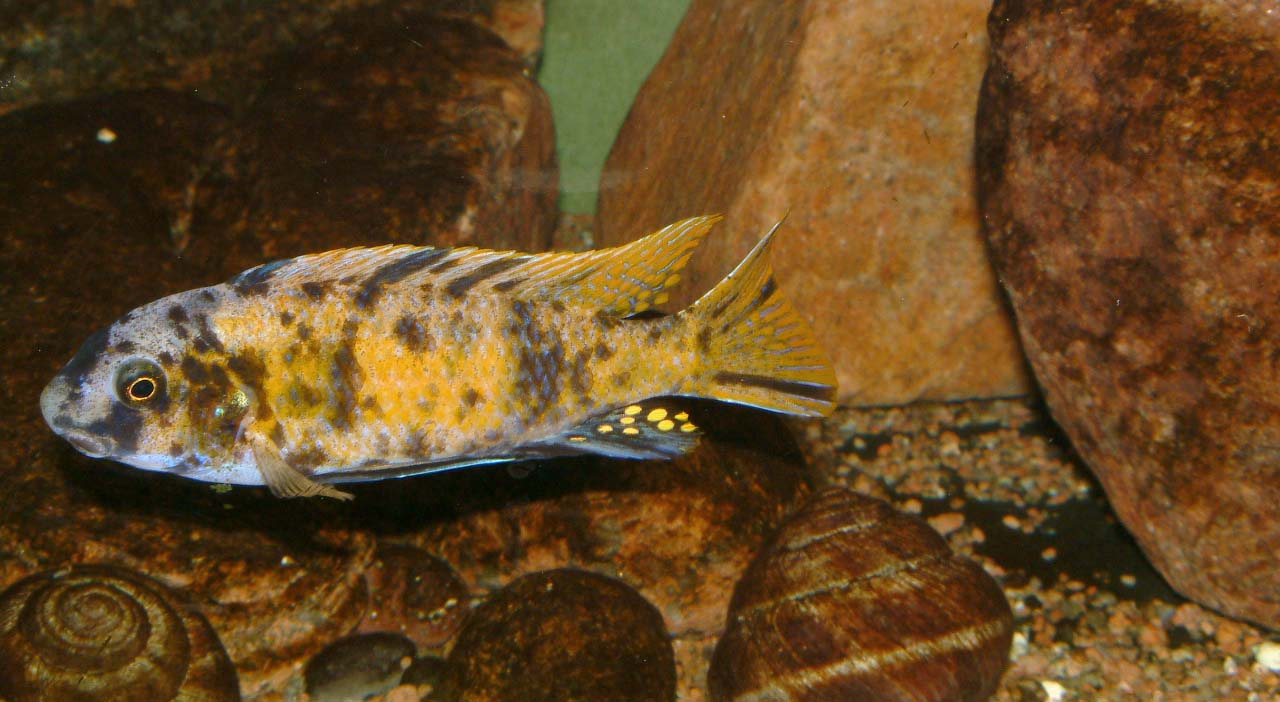
Labeotropheus fuelleborni

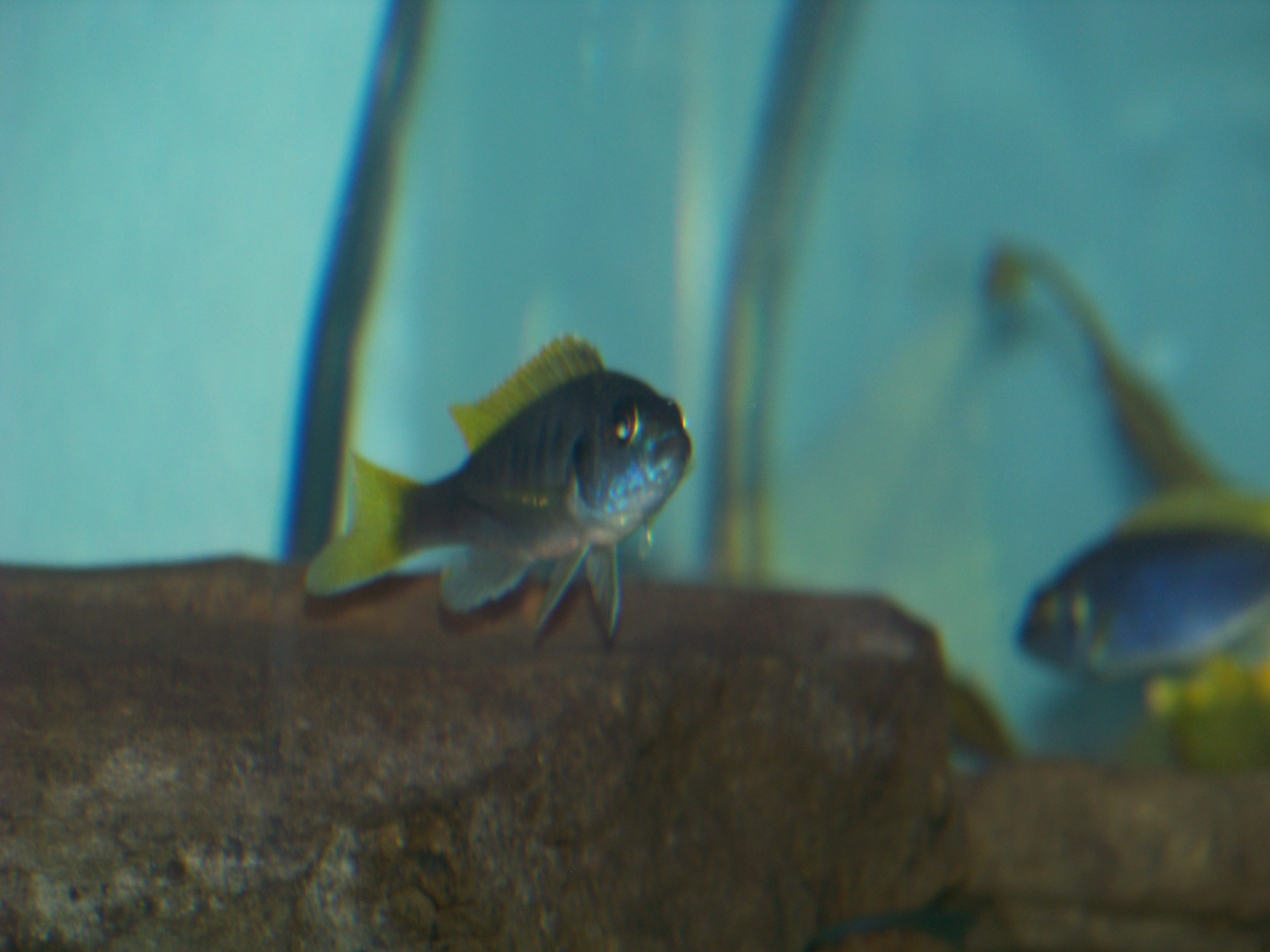
Pseudotropheus "acei"

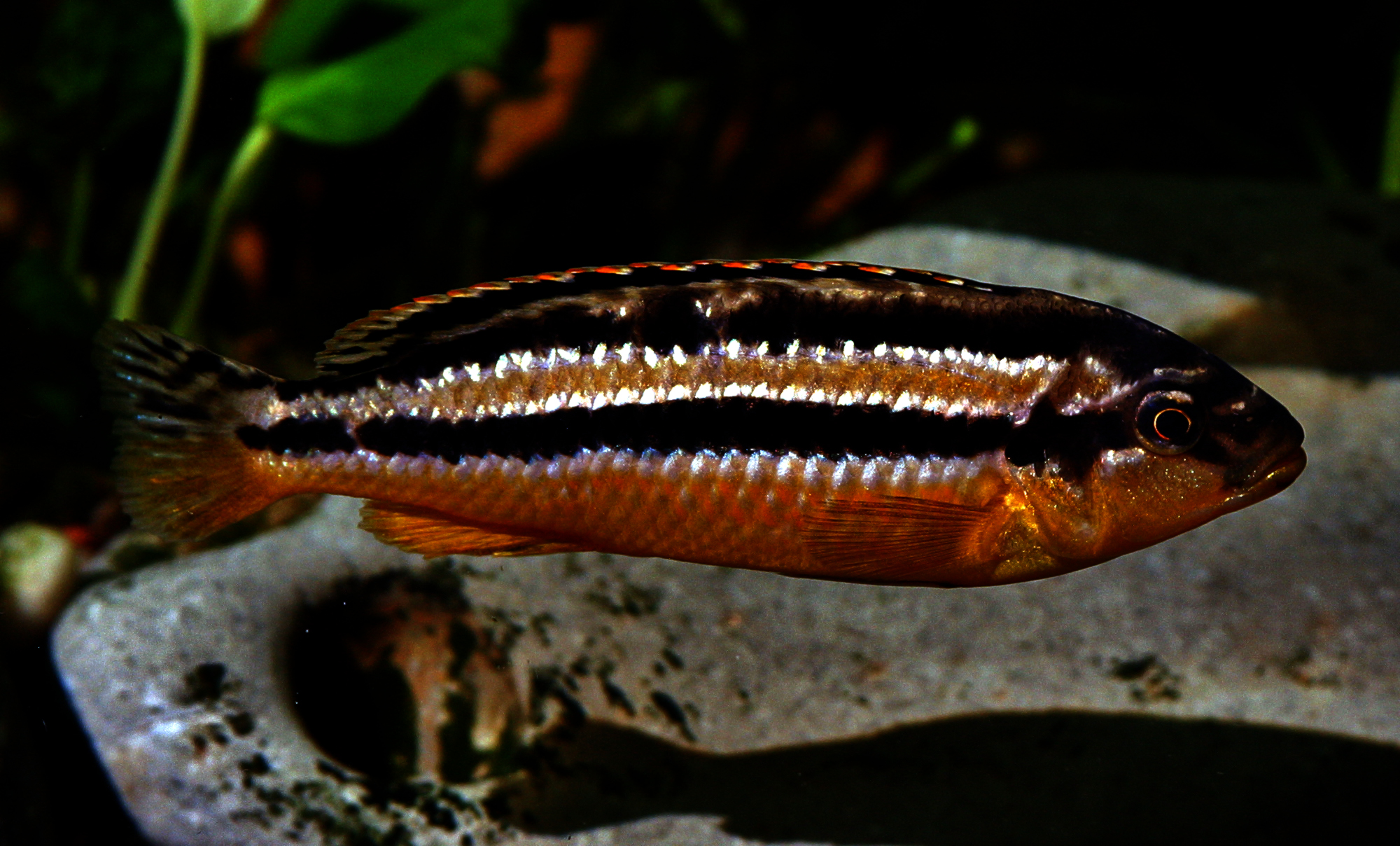
Female M. auratus

- Abactochromis Oliver & Arnegard 2010
- Chindongo Shan Li, Konings and Stauffer, 2016
- Cyathochromis Trewavas 1935
- Cynotilapia Regan 1922
- Genyochromis Trewavas 1935
- Gephyrochromis Boulenger 1901
- Iodotropheus Oliver & Loiselle 1972
- Labeotropheus Ahl 1926
- Labidochromis Trewavas 1935
- Maylandia Meyer & Foerster 1984. (syn. Metriaclima Stauffer, Bowers, Kellogg, & McKaye 1997)
- Melanochromis Trewavas 1935
- Petrotilapia Trewavas 1935
- Pseudotropheus Regan 1922
- Tropheops Trewavas 1984

The list below includes groups of nonmbuna mouthbrooding cichlids from Lake Malawi.

- Peacock cichlids (Aulonocara species)
- Utaka cichlids
- Other genera such as Rhamphochromis

== See also ==
- List of freshwater aquarium fish species
- Utaka
- Cichlids
- Aquarium
