= Blue zebra cichlid =

Blue zebra cichlid is a common name for several fish and may refer to:

- Maylandia callainos
- Maylandia greshakei
- Metriaclima callainos
