= Iodotropheus declivitas =

Scientific classification
- Kingdom: Animalia
- Phylum: Chordata
- Class: Actinopterygii
- Order: Cichliformes
- Family: Cichlidae
- Genus: Iodotropheus
- Species: I. declivitas

Binomial name
- Iodotropheus declivitas Stauffer, 1994

Species of fish

Iodotropheus declivitas is a species of cichlid endemic to Lake Malawi. This species can reach a length of 6.5 centimetres (2.6 in) SL. This taxon is regarded as a junior synonym of Iodotropheus sprengerae by some authorities.
