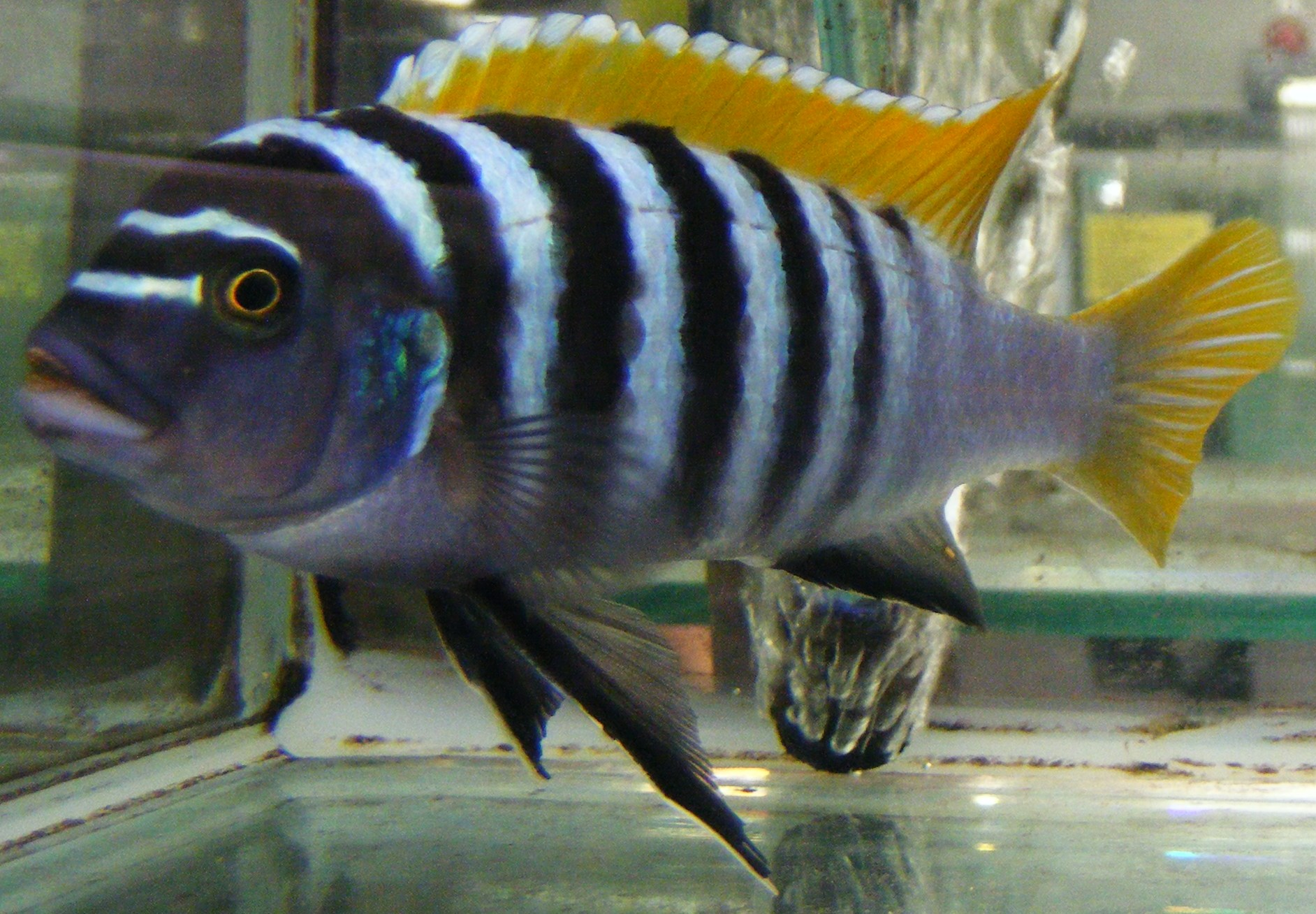

Conservation status
- Least Concern (IUCN 3.1)

Scientific classification
- Kingdom: Animalia
- Phylum: Chordata
- Class: Actinopterygii
- Order: Cichliformes
- Family: Cichlidae
- Genus: Maylandia
- Species: M. emmiltos

Binomial name
- Maylandia emmiltos (Stauffer, Bowers, Kellogg & McKaye, 1997)

Synonyms
- Metriaclima emmiltos Stauffer, Bowers, Kellogg & McKaye, 1997

= Maylandia emmiltos =

Species of fish

Maylandia emmiltos is a species of cichlid endemic to Lake Malawi where it is only known from the Mpanga Rocks near Chilumba. This species can reach a length of 8.4 centimetres (3.3 in) SL. It is also found in the aquarium trade.
