= Maylandia phaeos =

Conservation status
- Least Concern (IUCN 3.1)

Scientific classification
- Kingdom: Animalia
- Phylum: Chordata
- Class: Actinopterygii
- Order: Cichliformes
- Family: Cichlidae
- Genus: Maylandia
- Species: M. phaeos

Binomial name
- Maylandia phaeos (Stauffer, Bowers, Kellogg & McKaye, 1997)

Synonyms
- Metriaclima phaeos Stauffer, Bowers, Kellogg & McKaye, 1997

Species of fish

Maylandia phaeos is a species of cichlid endemic to Lake Malawi where it is known from Cobue on the Mozambique coast and possibly other places along the coast. This species can reach a length of 8.6 centimetres (3.4 in) SL.
