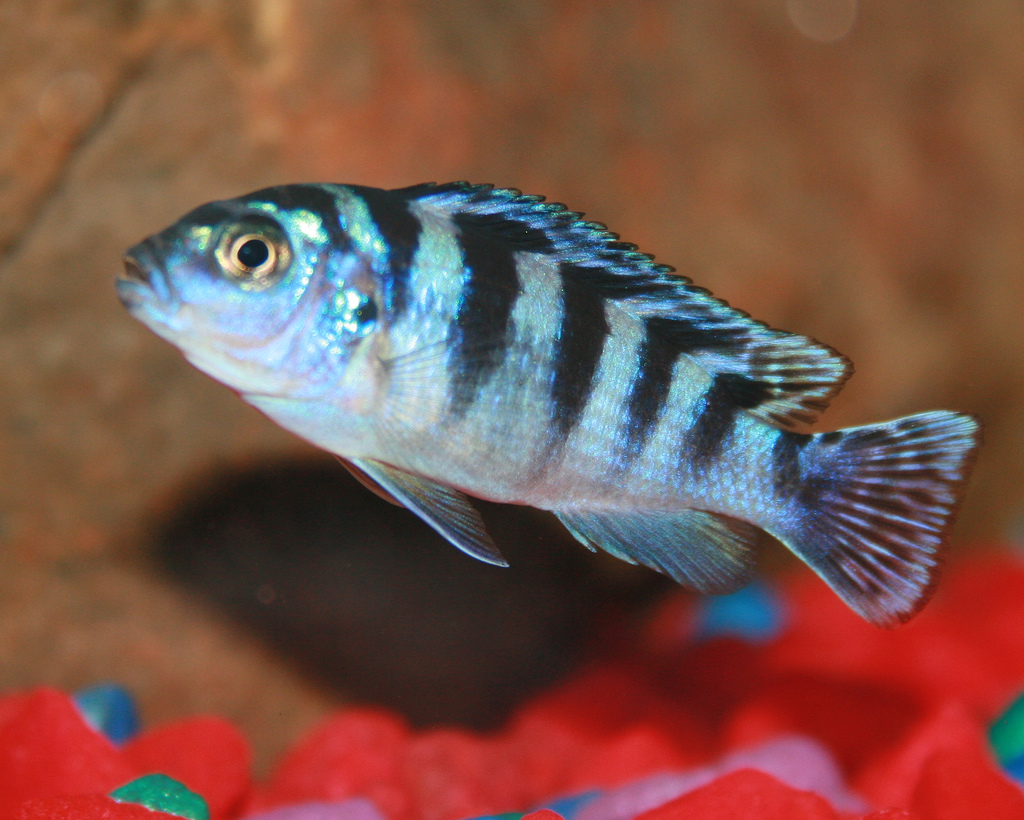
- Female Kennyi Mbuna or "lombardoi" (M. lombardoi)

Scientific classification
- Kingdom: Animalia
- Phylum: Chordata
- Class: Actinopterygii
- Division: Teleostei
- Order: Cichliformes
- Family: Cichlidae
- Tribe: Haplochromini
- Genus: Maylandia; M. K. Meyer & W. Förster, 1984

Type species
- Maylandia greshakei M. K. Meyer & W. Förster, 1984

Synonyms
- Metriaclima Stauffer, Bowers, Kellogg, & McKaye, 1997 (but see text)

= Maylandia =

Genus of fishes

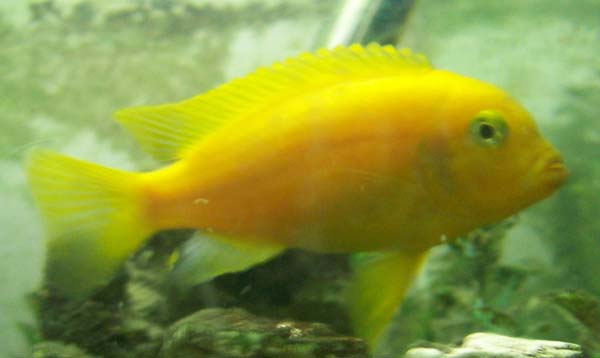
Male Maylandia lombardoi

Maylandia or Metriaclima is a genus of haplochromine cichlids endemic to Lake Malawi in East Africa. They belong to the mbuna (rock-dwelling) haplochromines.

All species in this genus are relatively small fishes, less than 20 cm (7.9 in) in length. Like most Lake Malawi cichlids, exhibit brood care via maternal mouthbrooding. Numerous members of the genus are traded as aquarium fish. They are attractive because they are brightly colored and often very sexually dimorphic; like other cichlids they are not suited for beginners and for most companion tanks.

== Name ==
The name Maylandia, honours the cichlid enthusiast and author about aquaria Hans Joachim Mayland, who died in 2004, was proposed as a subgenus of Pseudotropheus in 1984, naming the long-known but undescribed "Ice Blue Zebra" as the type species.

In 1997 Stauffer et al. described the genus Metriaclima, dismissing the pre-existing Maylandia on the assumption that it lacked a type species and a diagnosis. Two years later Condé and Géry published an analysis and declared Metriaclima to be a junior synonym of Maylandia, and Maylandia hence the valid name of the genus, a view accepted by most ichthyologists.

A few authors, notably Ad Konings, dispute that the original description of Maylandia is sufficient to establish and maintain the genus. They maintain that "Maylandia" is a nomen nudum – literally, a "naked name" that does not validly refer to a group of animals as per the rules of the International Code of Zoological Nomenclature.

In the present article, following FishBase, Catalog of Fishes and the IUCN, the genus name Maylandia is used.

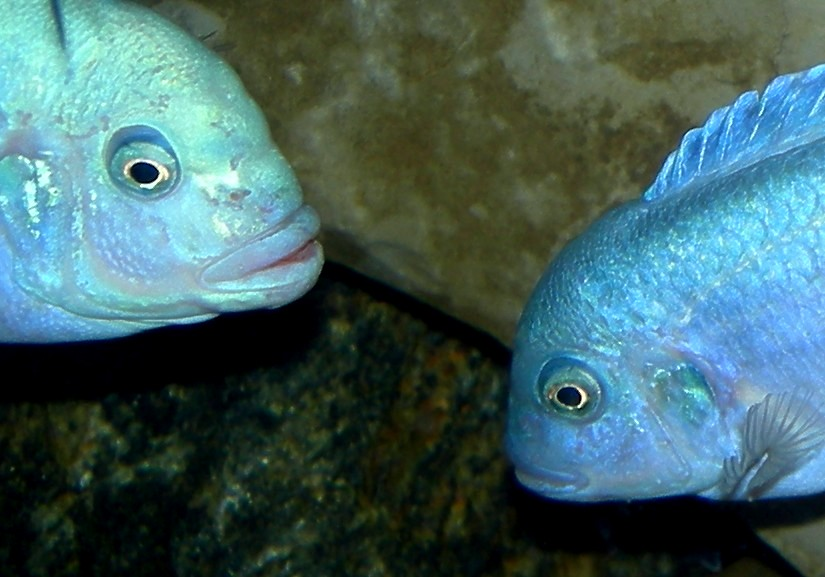
Male (left) and female Cobalt Zebras (M. callainos) are not dichromatic, but have different mouths

== Species ==
There are currently 30 recognized species in this genus:

- Maylandia aurora (W. E. Burgess, 1976)
- Maylandia barlowi (McKaye & Stauffer, 1986)
- Maylandia benetos (Stauffer, Bowers, Kellogg & McKaye, 1997)
- Maylandia callainos (Stauffer & Hert, 1992) (Cobalt Zebra, Cobalt Blue Mbuna)
- Maylandia chrysomallos (Stauffer, Bowers, Kellogg & McKaye, 1997)
- Maylandia cyneusmarginatus (Stauffer, Bowers, Kellogg & McKaye, 1997)
- Maylandia emmiltos (Stauffer, Bowers, Kellogg & McKaye, 1997)
- Maylandia estherae (Konings, 1995) (Red Zebra Mbuna, Red Zebra, Esther Grant's Zebra)
- Maylandia fainzilberi Staeck, 1976
- Maylandia flavicauda (Li, Konings & Stauffer 2016)
- Maylandia flavifemina (Konings & Stauffer, 2006)
- Maylandia glaucos (Ciccotta, Konings & Stauffer, 2011)
- Maylandia greshakei (M. K. Meyer & W. Förster, 1984) (William's Mbuna, Ice Blue Zebra Mbuna, Ice Blue Zebra)
- Maylandia hajomaylandi (M. K. Meyer & Schartl, 1984)
- Maylandia heteropicta Staeck, 1980
- Maylandia koningsi (Stauffer 2018)
- Maylandia lanisticola (W. E. Burgess, 1976)
- Maylandia livingstonii (Boulenger, 1899)
- Maylandia lombardoi (W. E. Burgess, 1977) (Kennyi Mbuna, Kenyi Mbuna, Lombardoi Mbuna)
- Maylandia lundoensis (Stauffer, K. E. Black & Konings, 2013)
- Maylandia mbenjii (Stauffer, Bowers, Kellogg & McKaye, 1997)
- Maylandia midomo (Stauffer, K. E. Black & Konings, 2013)
- Maylandia mossambica (Ciccotta, Konings & Stauffer, 2011)
- Maylandia nigrodorsalis (Stauffer, K. E. Black & Konings, 2013)
- Maylandia nkhunguensis (Ciccotta, Konings & Stauffer, 2011)
- Maylandia pambazuko (Stauffer, K. E. Black & Konings, 2013)
- Maylandia phaeos (Stauffer, Bowers, Kellogg & McKaye, 1997)
- Maylandia pulpican (Tawil, 2002)
- Maylandia pyrsonotos (Stauffer, Bowers, Kellogg & McKaye, 1997)
- Maylandia sciasma (Ciccotta, Konings & Stauffer, 2011)
- Maylandia tarakiki (Stauffer, K. E. Black & Konings, 2013)
- Maylandia xanstomachus (Stauffer & Boltz, 1989)
- Maylandia xanthos (Ciccotta, Konings & Stauffer, 2011)
- Maylandia zebra (Boulenger, 1899) (Zebra Mbuna)
