= Maylandia mbenjii =

Conservation status
- Least Concern (IUCN 3.1)

Scientific classification
- Kingdom: Animalia
- Phylum: Chordata
- Class: Actinopterygii
- Order: Cichliformes
- Family: Cichlidae
- Genus: Maylandia
- Species: M. mbenjii

Binomial name
- Maylandia mbenjii (Stauffer, Bowers, Kellogg & McKaye, 1997)

Synonyms
- Metriaclima mbenjii Stauffer, Bowers, Kellogg & McKaye, 1997

Species of fish

Maylandia mbenjii is a species of cichlid endemic to Lake Malawi where it is only known from Mbenji Island. This species can reach a length of 8.8 centimetres (3.5 in) SL. It is also found in the aquarium trade.
