= Maylandia cyneusmarginata =

Conservation status
- Near Threatened (IUCN 3.1)

Scientific classification
- Kingdom: Animalia
- Phylum: Chordata
- Class: Actinopterygii
- Order: Cichliformes
- Family: Cichlidae
- Genus: Maylandia
- Species: M. cyneusmarginata

Binomial name
- Maylandia cyneusmarginata (Stauffer, Bowers, Kellogg & McKaye, 1997)

Synonyms
- Metriaclima cyneusmarginatus Stauffer, Bowers, Kellogg & McKaye, 1997; Maylandia cyneusmarginatus (Stauffer, Bowers, Kellogg & McKaye, 1997)

Species of fish

Maylandia cyneusmarginata is a species of fish in the family Cichlidae. It is endemic to Lake Malawi. The blue marginal band on its fin and brown lappets distinguish it from other members of its genus.
