= Maylandia flavifemina =

Conservation status
- Least Concern (IUCN 3.1)

Scientific classification
- Kingdom: Animalia
- Phylum: Chordata
- Class: Actinopterygii
- Order: Cichliformes
- Family: Cichlidae
- Genus: Maylandia
- Species: M. flavifemina

Binomial name
- Maylandia flavifemina (Konings & Stauffer, 2006)

Synonyms
- Metriaclima flavifemina Konings & Stauffer, 2006

Species of fish

Maylandia flavifemina is a species of haplochromine cichlid which is endemic to Lake Malawi.

== Description ==
Maylandia flavifemina has 17–19 spines in its dorsal fin which also have 17–19 soft rays, there are 8-10 spines and 6–9 soft rays. Juveniles and femalesvary in colour from a pale bluish-beige to completely yellow and they have a bright yellow anal fin. The males have a black anal fin and black membranes in the caudal fin, distinguishing them from their congeners which have blue or yellow anal fins and the membranes of the caudal fin are yellow or blue. They grow to a standard length of 8.5 centimetres (3.3 in).

== Distribution ==
Maylandia flavifemina is endemic to Lake Malawi where it has been recorded from the southern part of the lake in Malawi, occurring around Maleri Island, Nakantenga Island, Nankoma Island, Thumbi West Island, Chidunga Rocks and Namalenje Island.

== Habitat and ecology ==
Maylandia flavifemina inhabits Lives the interfaces between sandy and rock substrates over slabs, above small areas of sand between rocks and rarely over fragmented rock. The males are territorial and will defend their territories against conspecific males. A territory usually consists of an area of sand situated between rocks and males with territories at the bottom of reefs excavate a spawning cave beneath the rock. The females are frequently solitary but they can be found in small groups of up to 3 individuals. The juveniles and non-territorial adult males similarly occur in singles, pairs or in small shoals of 3-8 fish. It occurs at depths of 5–40 metres (16–131 ft)>

This species feeds from the sediment rich aufwuchs on the rocks, raking diatoms and loose algal strands with its mouth. They have also been recorded as eating benthic crustaceans, insects and plankton.

== Name ==
This species was first recorded in 1998 but was not formally described until Ad Konings and Jay Richard Stauffer Jr. named it as Metriaclima flavifemina in 2006. The specific name flavifemina is Latin for "yellow lady", an allusion to the yellow colouration of the females.
