= Maylandia xanstomachus =

Conservation status
- Near Threatened (IUCN 3.1)

Scientific classification
- Kingdom: Animalia
- Phylum: Chordata
- Class: Actinopterygii
- Order: Cichliformes
- Family: Cichlidae
- Genus: Maylandia
- Species: M. xanstomachus

Binomial name
- Maylandia xanstomachus (Stauffer & Boltz, 1989)

Synonyms
- Metriaclima xanstomachus (Stauffer & Boltz, 1989); Pseudotropheus xanstomachus Stauffer & Boltz, 1989

Species of fish

Maylandia xanstomachus is a species of cichlid endemic to Lake Malawi where it is only known from the Maleri Islands and Kanjedza Island. This species can reach a length of 12.5 centimetres (4.9 in) TL. It can also be found in the aquarium trade.
