= Maylandia benetos =

Conservation status
- Near Threatened (IUCN 3.1)

Scientific classification
- Kingdom: Animalia
- Phylum: Chordata
- Class: Actinopterygii
- Order: Cichliformes
- Family: Cichlidae
- Genus: Maylandia
- Species: M. benetos

Binomial name
- Maylandia benetos (Stauffer, Bowers, Kellogg & McKaye, 1997)

Synonyms
- Metriaclima benetos Stauffer, Bowers, Kellogg & McKaye, 1997

Species of fish

Maylandia benetos is a species of cichlid endemic to Lake Malawi where it is only known from the southeastern part of the lake from Mazinzi Reef.
