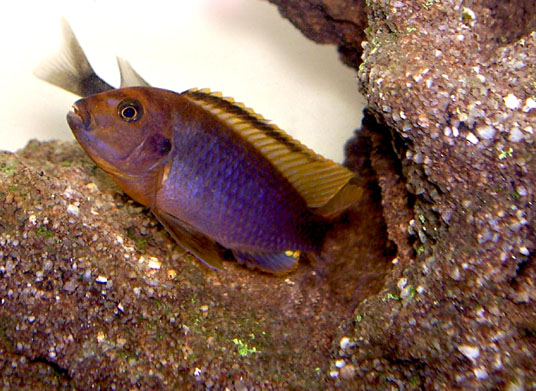
- Lavender mbuna, Iodotropheus sprengerae

Scientific classification
- Kingdom: Animalia
- Phylum: Chordata
- Class: Actinopterygii
- Order: Cichliformes
- Family: Cichlidae
- Subfamily: Pseudocrenilabrinae
- Tribe: Haplochromini
- Genus: Iodotropheus; M. K. Oliver & Loiselle, 1972

Type species
- Iodotropheus sprengerae Oliver & Loiselle, 1972

= Iodotropheus =

Genus of fishes

Iodotropheus is a small genus of cichlids endemic to Lake Malawi in east Africa. The genus is distinguished from other genera of mbuna by the upper lip which is usually connected medially to the skin of the snout by a frenum; by its small, terminal mouth; by the outer teeth of both jaws, which are unequally bicuspid and loosely spaced, the tooth shafts inclined slightly toward the jaw symphysis; by the anterior teeth of the upper jaw being much longer and more robust than the lateral and posterior teeth. The rusty cichlid or lavender mbuna, Iodotropheus sprengerae is the most commonly encountered member of the genus in the aquarium trade.

== Species ==
There are currently three recognized species in this genus:

- Iodotropheus declivitas Stauffer, 1994
- Iodotropheus sprengerae M. K. Oliver & Loiselle, 1972 (Rusty cichlid, Lavender mbuna)
- Iodotropheus stuartgranti Konings, 1990

== In the aquarium ==
Like all cichlids from Lake Malawi these cichlids are best maintained in hard, alkaline water. Iodotropheus are best kept in aquariums with volumes greater than 120 L (31.5 gallon).
