= CCDC138 =

Protein found in humans

Identifiers
- Aliases: CCDC138, coiled-coil domain containing 138
- External IDs: MGI: 1923388; GeneCards: CCDC138

Gene location (Human)
Chr.	Chromosome 2 (human)
Band	2q13	Start	108,786,757 bp
Band	2q13	End	108,885,477 bp

Gene location (Mouse)
Chr.	Chromosome 10 (mouse)
Band	10|10 B4	Start	58,497,948 bp
Band	10|10 B4	End	58,576,244 bp
RNA expression pattern
Bgee	Human / Mouse (ortholog); Top expressed in: testicle; sperm; ventricular zone; olfactory zone of nasal mucosa; ganglionic eminence; gonad; secondary oocyte; right uterine tube; Achilles tendon; bronchial epithelial cell / Top expressed in: spermatid; zygote; spermatocyte; tail of embryo; genital tubercle; ventricular zone; right kidney; embryo; morula; embryo; More reference expression data
BioGPS	n/a
Orthologs
Databases	NCBI: entry; OMA: entry
Species	Human	Mouse
Entrez	165055	76138
Ensembl	ENSG00000163006	ENSMUSG00000038010
UniProt	Q96M89	Q0VF22
RefSeq (mRNA)	NM_001303105; NM_001303106; NM_144978; NM_001351544; NM_001351545 NM_001351548; NM_001351549; NM_001351551; NM_001351553; NM_001351554; NM_001351555; NM_001351557; NM_001351559; NM_001351561; NM_001351565	NM_001162956
RefSeq (protein)	NP_001290034; NP_001290035; NP_659415; NP_001338473; NP_001338474 NP_001338477; NP_001338478; NP_001338480; NP_001338482; NP_001338483; NP_001338484; NP_001338486; NP_001338488; NP_001338490; NP_001338494	NP_001156428
Location (UCSC)	Chr 2: 108.79 – 108.89 Mb	Chr 10: 58.5 – 58.58 Mb
PubMed search
- Wikidata
View/Edit Human	View/Edit Mouse

Coiled-coil domain-containing protein 138, also known as CCDC138, is a human protein encoded by the CCDC138 gene. The exact function of CCDC138 is unknown.

== Gene ==
The CCDC138 gene can be found at the positive strand of chromosome 2.

=== Locus ===
The CCDC138 gene is located at the long(q) arm of chromosome 2 at locus 12.13, or in short 2q12.3. It can be found at location 108,786,752-108,876,591. The DNA sequence is 89,840bp long.

The red line shows the CCDC138 locus on chromosome 2q12.3.

=== Common aliases ===
CCDC138 is the only established common alias.

== Homology and evolution ==
=== Paralogs ===
No paralogs of CCDC138 have been identified.

=== Orthologs ===
CCDC138 is conserved in various organisms as shown in the table below.

Scientific name	Common name	Date of divergence from human lineage	Sequence length	Sequence identity to human RNA/protein	Sequence similarity to human RNA/protein
Mus musculus	House mouse	92.3 MYA	2466 bp	77%	65.7%
Columbia livia	Rock dove	296 MYA	1863 bp	61%	59.4%
Xenopus laevis	African clawed frog	371.2 MYA	2634 bp	52%	40.1%
Anolis carolinensis	Red-throated anole	296 MYA	9588 bp	78%	46.3%
Latimeria chalumnae	West Indian Ocean coelacanth	414.9 MYA	1838 bp	71%	38.1%
Strongylocentrotus purpuratus	Purple sea urchin	742.9 MYA	2047 bp	59%	14.5%
Ciona intestinalis	Vase tunicate	722.5 MYA	2420 bp	56%	23.8%
Aplysia californica	California sea slug	782.7 MYA	2103 bp	49%	17.2%
Hydra vulgaris	Fresh-water polyp	855.3 MYA	1482 bp	46%	13.7%
Chrysemys picta bellii	Western painted turtle	296 MYA	700 bp	36%	15.9%
Alligator mississippiensis	American alligator	296 MYA	2089 bp	76%	38.4%
Melopsittacus undulatus	Budgerigar	296 MYA	1764 bp	73%	40.3%
Taeniopygia guttata	Zebra finch	296 MYA	1980 bp	75%	44.2%
Lepisosteus oculatus	Spotted gar	400.1 MYA	1269 bp	65%	30.9%
Saccoglossus kowalevskii	Acorn worm	661.2 MYA	2515 bp	42%	24.1%
Branchiostoma floridae	Lancelet	713.2 YA	1758 bp	55%	27.0%
Maylandia zebra	Zebra mbuna fish	400.1 MYA	4815 bp	58%	21.4%
Trichoplax adhaerens	Trichoplax	800 MYA	1605 bp	56%	10.3%
Pelodiscus sinensis	Chinese softshell turtle	296 MYA	2895 bp	77%	33.9%
Falco cherrug	Saker falcon	296 MYA	1866 bp	73%	48.9%

=== Distant homologs ===
The most distant homolog detected or predicted is Trichoplax adhaerans. It has a conserved CCDC138 gene and has evolved 800 MYA before the human lineage.

=== Homologous domains ===
Among the orthologs stated above, there are various homologous regions that are conserved shown in figures below.

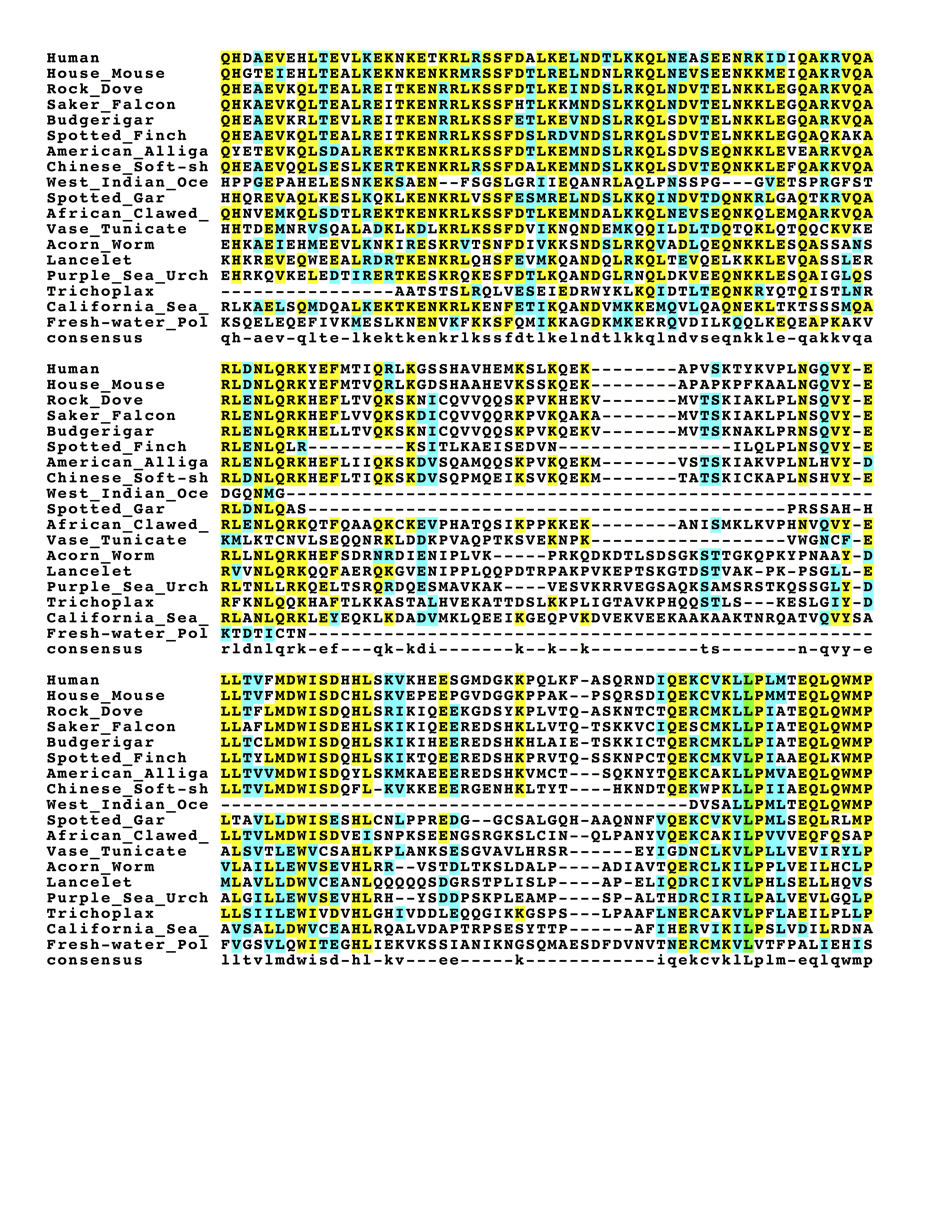
CCDC138 multiple sequence alignment showing conserved regions.

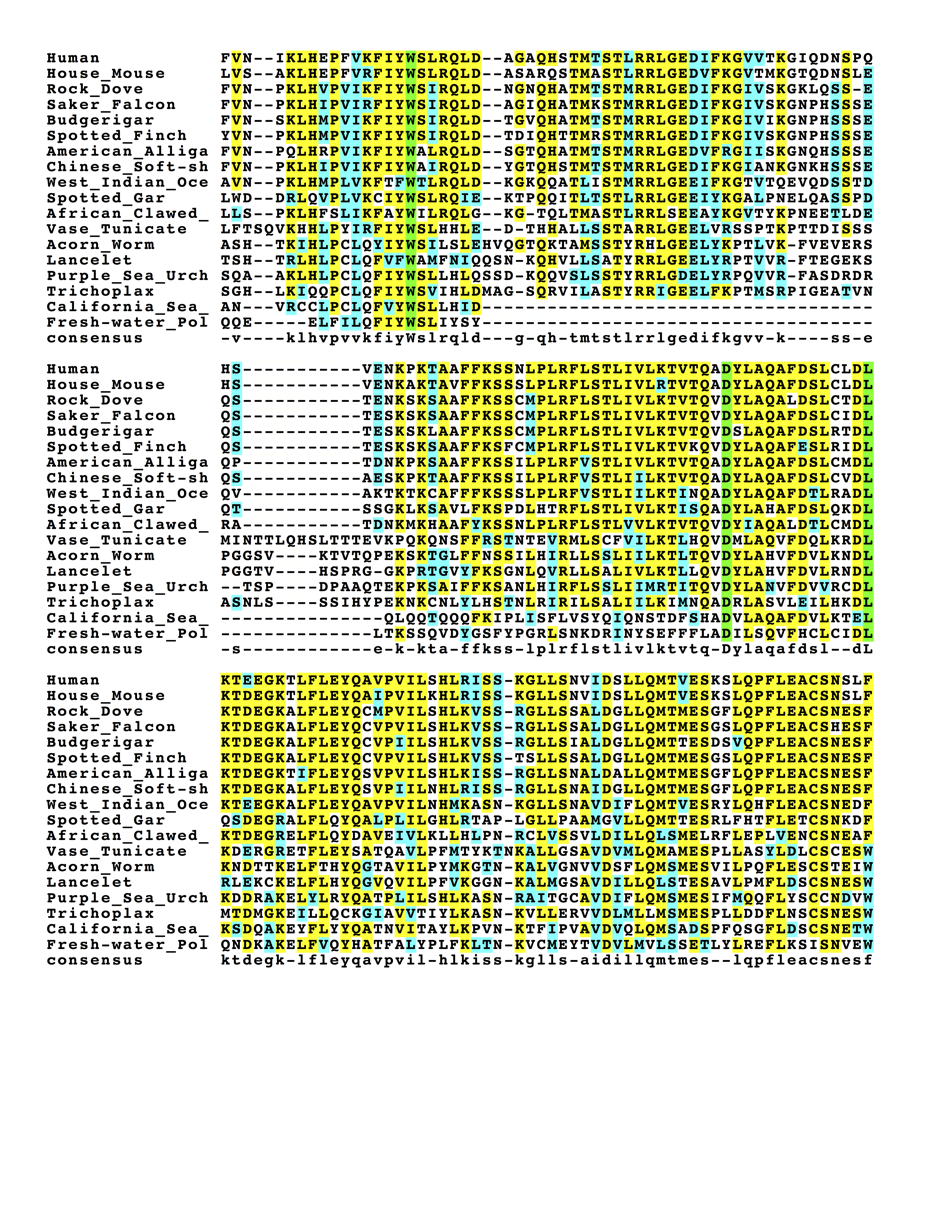
CCDC138 multiple sequence alignment showing conserved regions.

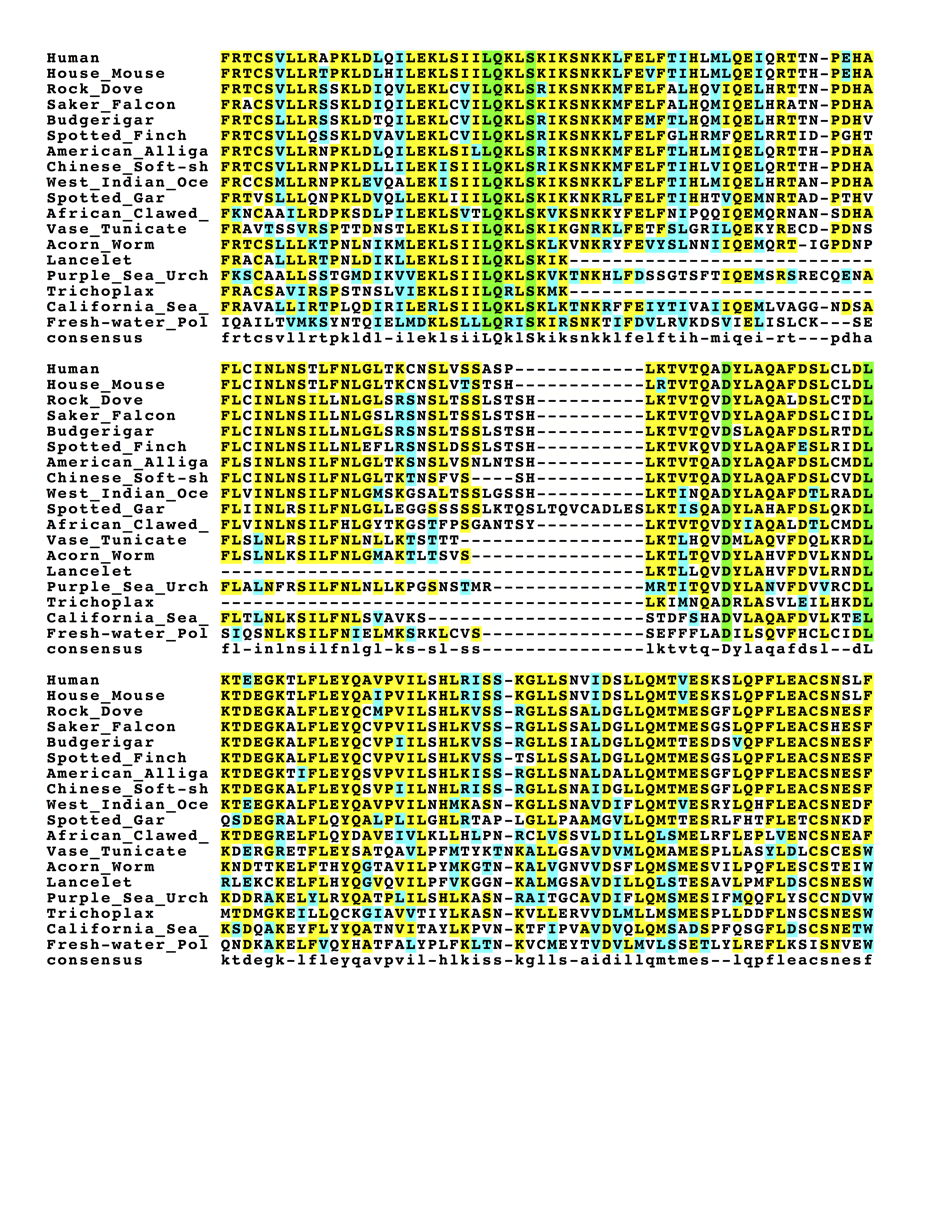
CCDC138 multiple sequence alignment showing conserved regions.

Green colors shows completely conserved residues, yellow color shows identical residues, cyan color shows similar residues, white color shows different residues.

=== Phylogeny ===
The observed phylogeny of the CCDC138 gene of the above mentioned orthologs recapitulates the evolutionary history.

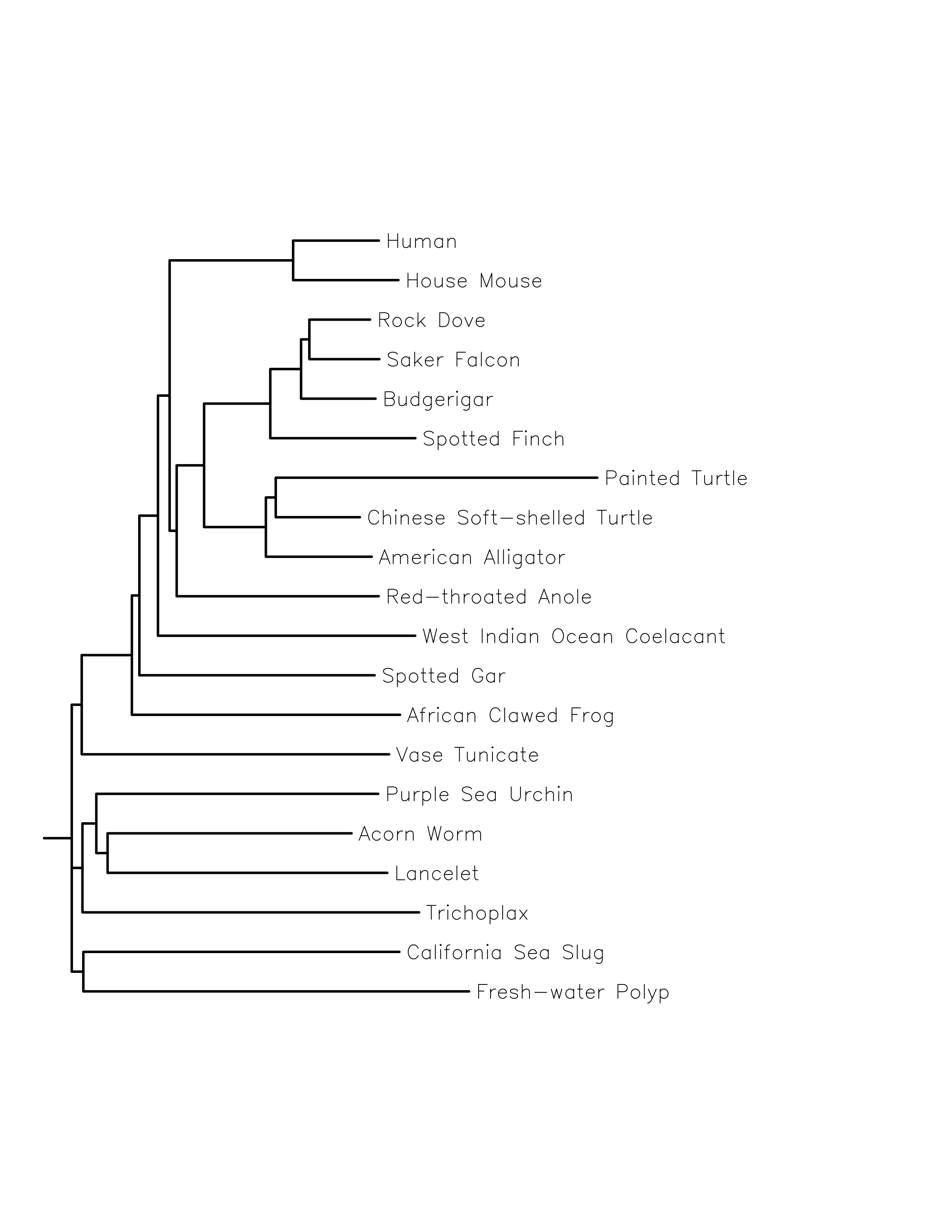
CCDC138 rooted phylogeny tree

The figure above shows the evolutionary relationship of CCDC138 in the orthologs.

== Protein ==
The CCDC138 protein is predated to have a molecular weight of 76.2Kda and an isoelectric point of 8.614. Compositional analysis shows that there is a low usage of the AGP grouping in CCDC138, and there are no positive, negative or mixed charge clusters. The protein has no ER retention motif in the C-terminus and no RNA binding motif. It has also been predicted to be a soluble nuclear protein with a leucine zipper pattern (PS00029) at position 205 onwards with a sequence LQKRERFLLEREQLLFRHENAL.

=== Primary sequence and variants/isoforms ===
There are two isoforms of the CCDC138 protein. The primary isoform has 665 amino acids while the secondary isoform has 577 amino acids, and is missing 88 amino acids at the C-terminus.

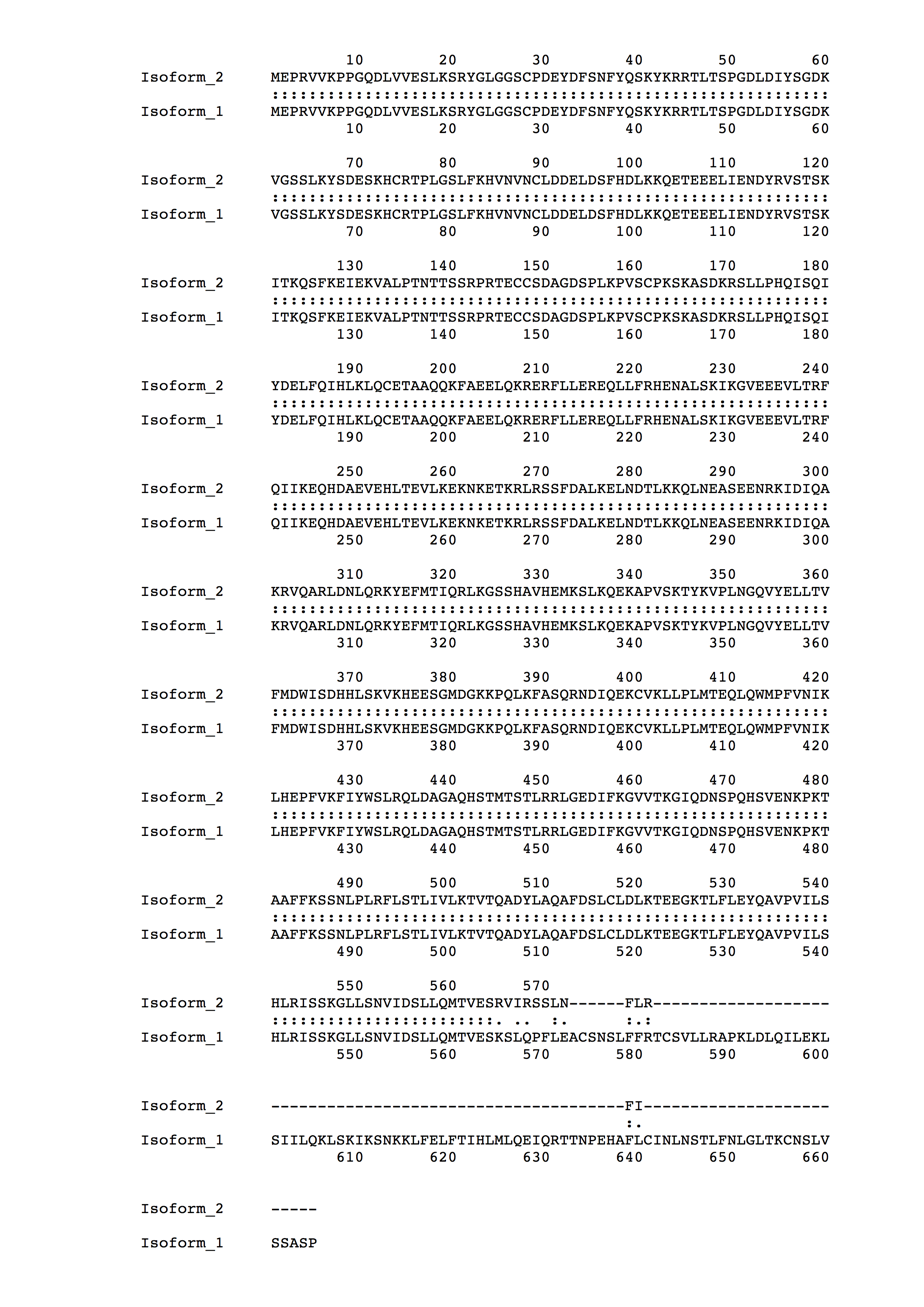
Pairwise sequence alignment comparing isoforms 1 and 2 of the CCDC138 protein.

Figure shows the pairwise sequence alignment comparing the primary isoform (Isoform 1) to the secondary isoform (Isoform 2).

=== Domain and motifs ===
A domain of unknown function (DUF2317) on the protein at location 212 – 315 has been characterized in bacteria. TMHMM and TMAP suggests that there are no predicted transmembrane domain. SOSUI further predicts that CCDC138 is a soluble protein with no transmembrane domain.

=== Post-translational modifications ===
According to SUMOplot Analysis Program, there are 7 predicted sumoylation at lysine residues K7, K207, K336, K374, K383, K521, and K591. NetPhos predicts that there are 44 phosphorylations sites, including 29 serine residues, 10 threonine residues, and 5 tyrosine residues. There are no further post-translational modifications as predicted by NetNGlyc, NetOGlyc, SignalP, Sulfinator, and Myristoylator.

=== Secondary structure ===
The CCDC138 protein contains multiple alpha helixes, beta sheets and coiled-coils as predicted by PELE, CHOFAS, and GOR4.

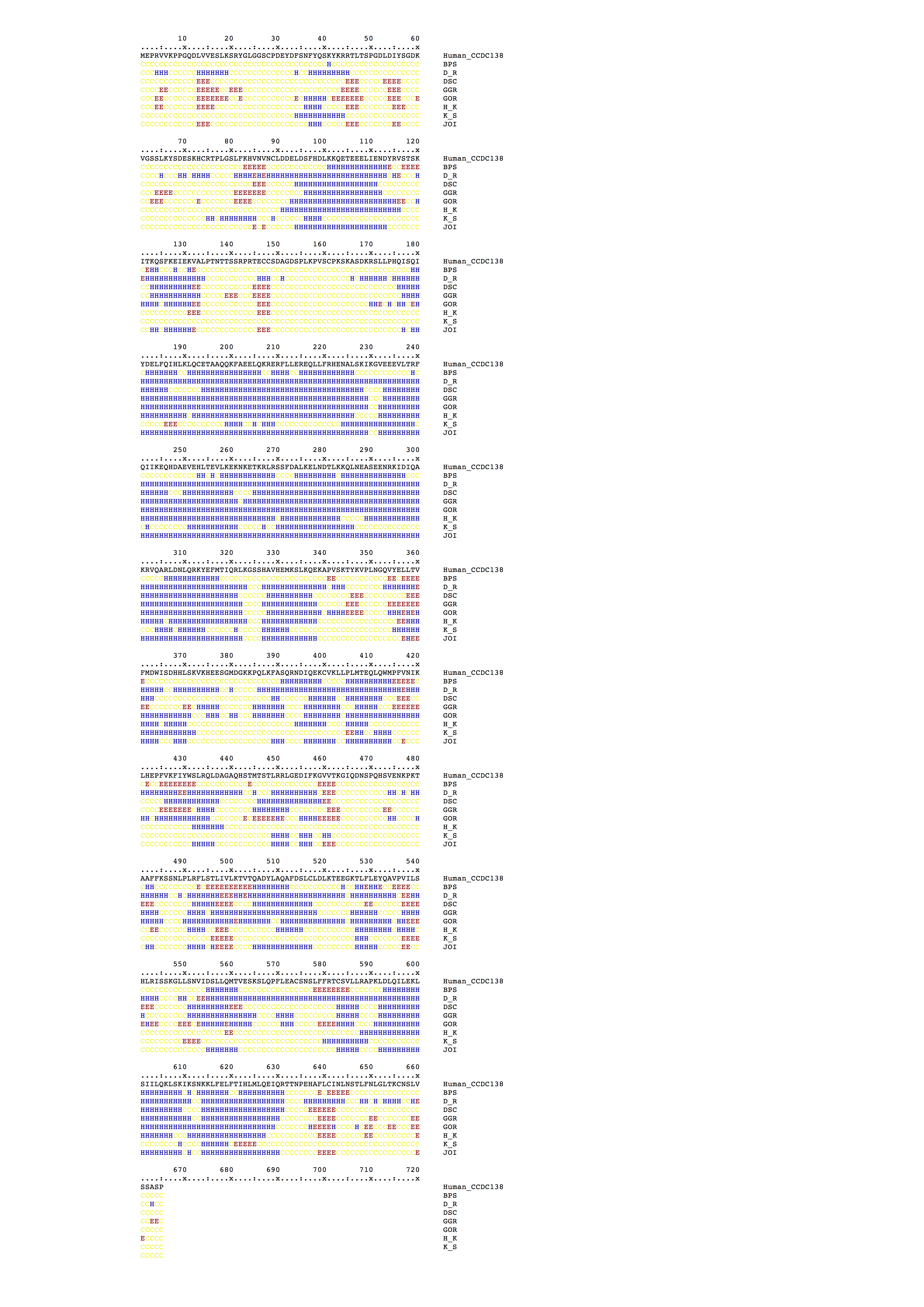
CCDC138 secondary structure as predicted by PELE

Yellow shows coiled-coil, blue shows alpha helix, and red shows beta sheet. The majority of the sequence are coiled-coils and alpha helixes.

=== 3° and 4° structures ===
There are no predicted 3° and 4° Structures for the CCDC138 protein. However, there is a similar structure that has a 29% identity. The predicted structure is Chain A, crystal structure analysis of Clpb, a protein that encodes an ATP-dependent protease and chaperone. This protein has an aligned-length of 144 amino acids, and the alignment is located at the domain of unknown function of CCDC138.

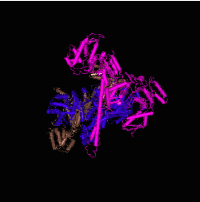
Chain A, crystal analysis structure of Clpb

== Expression ==
The gene is expressed at low levels in almost all human tissues, but higher levels have been seen in certain cancer tissues. CCDC138 is a soluble protein that is pre diced to localise in the nucleus of a cell.

=== Promoter ===
The promoter region of CCDC138 is shown as figure below.

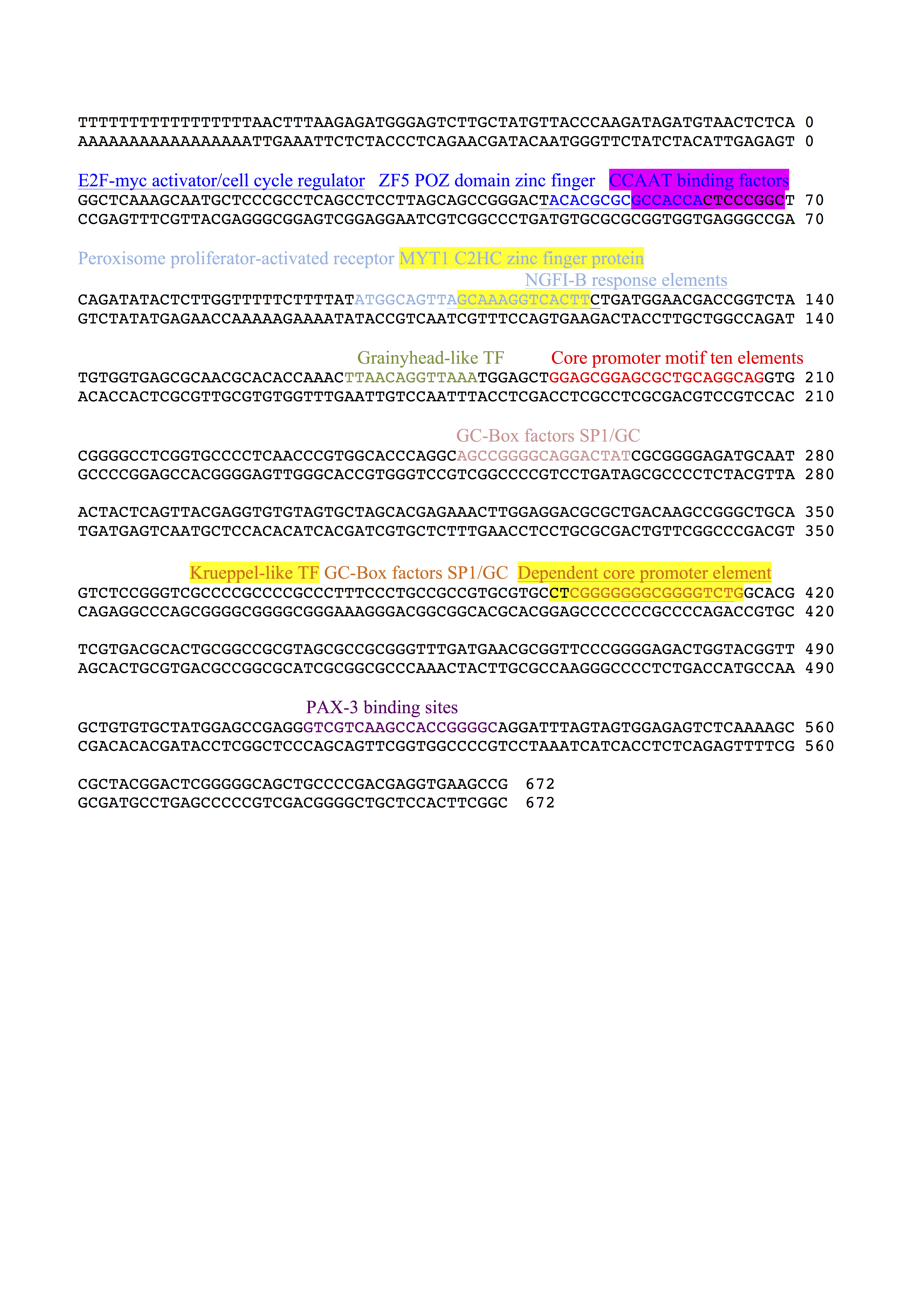
Promoter region of CCDC138 with labeled transcription factor binding sites

=== Expression ===
Microarray-assessed tissue expression patterns through GEO profiles show that CCDC138 is expressed in moderate levels in various tissues including peripheral blood lymphocyte, fetal thymus, thymus, testis, ovary, feral brain, colon, mammary gland, and bone marrow.

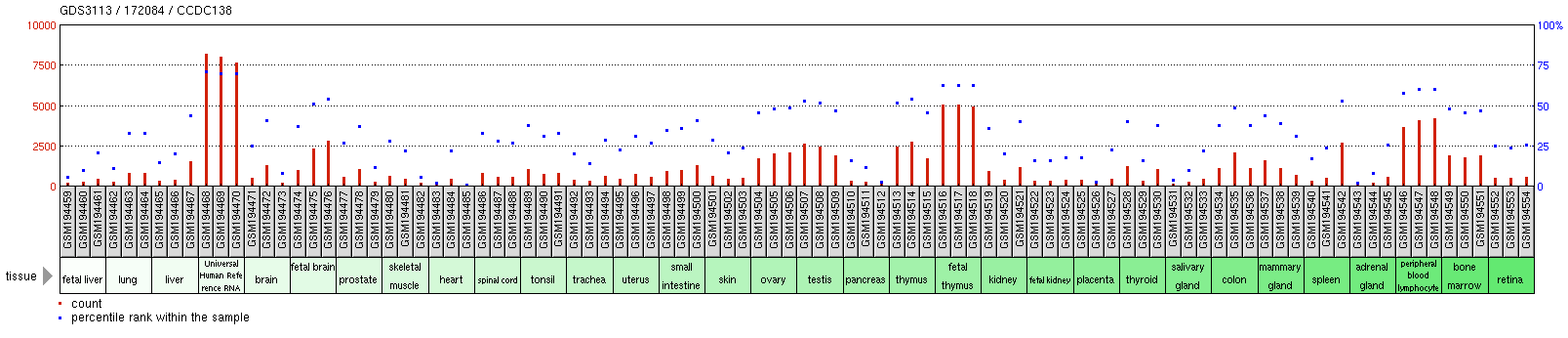
Microarray-assessed tissue expression patterns shown in GEO profile.

=== Transcript variants ===
There are two most significant alternative transcript variants for CCDC138 mRNA. The first variant as shown in the figure below has been found in lung, blood, and human embryonic stem cells. The second variant has been found in adenocarcinoma, prostate, lung, and primary lung epithelial cells.

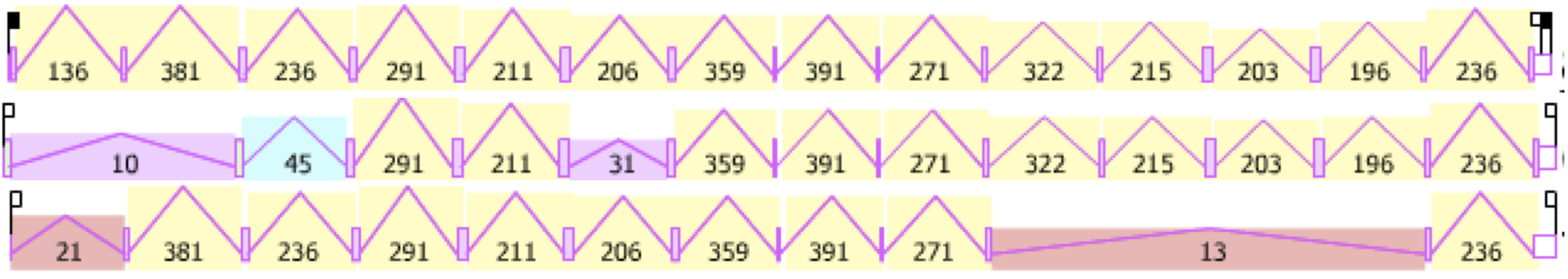
Transcript variants of CCDC138

First transcript shows the complete mRNA transcript. Second transcript is the first variant, while the thirst transcript is the second variant.

== Function and biochemistry ==
The exact function of CCDC138 is yet to be known.

== Interacting proteins ==
The CCDC138 protein has been found to interact with ubiquitin C, a protein involved in ubiquination and eventually protein degradation.

=== Transcription factors that might bind to regulatory sequence ===
The table below shows some transcription factors that have been predicted by Genomatix that binds to the regulatory sequence of the CCDC138 gene.

Detailed family information	Detailed matrix information	Tissue
GC-Box factors SP1/GC	Stimulating protein 1, ubiquitous zinc finger transcription factor	Ubiquitous
Peroxisome proliferator-activated receptor	Peroxisome proliferator-activated receptor gamma, DR1 sites	Adipose Tissue, Connective Tissue, Digestive System, Liver
MYT1 C2HC zinc finger protein	MyT1 zinc finger transcription factor involved in primary neurogenesis	Central Nervous System, Nervous System, Neuroglia, Neurons
NGFI-B response elements, nur subfamily of nuclear receptors	Monomers of the nur subfamily of nuclear receptors (nur77, nurr1, nor-1)	Brain, Central Nervous System, Endocrine System, Immune System, Leydig Cells, Nervous System, Neurons, Testis, Thymus Gland, Urogenital System
Krueppel-like transcription factors	Core promoter-binding protein (CPBP) with 3 Krueppel-type zinc fingers (KLF6, ZF9)	Blood cells, bone marrow cells, digestive system, embryonic structures, Erythrocytes, Hematopoietic System, liver
Grainyhead-like transcription factors	Grainyhead-like 3 (sister-of-mammalian grainyhead - SOM)	Embryonic Structures, Integumentary System
CTCF and BORIS gene family, transcriptional regulators with 11 highly conserved zinc finger domains	Insulator protein CTCF (CCCTC-binding factor)	Blood Cells, Embryonic Structures, Endocrine System, Erythrocytes, Germ Cells, Testis, Urogenital System
Core promoter motif ten elements	Human motif ten element	-
Abdominal-B type homeodomain transcription factors	Homeobox C13 / Hox-3gamma	Bone Marrow Cells, Bone and Bones, Central Nervous System, Connective Tissue, Embryonic Structures, Hematopoietic System, Integumentary System, Kidney, Nervous System, Neurons, Prostate, Skeleton, Spinal Cord, Urogenital System
E2F-myc activator/cell cycle regulator	E2F transcription factor 2	Ubiquitous
PAX-3 binding sites	Pax-3 paired domain protein, expressed in embryogenesis, mutations correlate to Waardenburg Syndrome	Embryonic structures, muscle, skeletal, muscles
ZF5 POZ domain zinc finger	ZF5 POZ domain zinc finger, zinc finger protein 161	-
Vertebrate TATA binding protein factor	Cellular and viral TATA box elements	-
CCAAT binding factors	Avian C-type LTR CCAAT box	Ubiquitous
Ccaat/Enhancer Binding Protein	CCAAT/enhancer binding protein alpha	Adipose Tissue, Bone Marrow Cells, Connective Tissue, Digestive System, Hematopoietic System, Immune System, Liver, Myeloid Cells, Phagocytes
Activator-, mediator- and TBP-dependent core promoter element for RNA polymerase II transcription from TATA-less promoters	X gene core promoter element 1	-

== Clinical significance ==
CCDC138 has been identified as one of the many genes involved in initiating term labor in myometrium.
