= Maylandia chrysomallos =

Conservation status
- Near Threatened (IUCN 3.1)

Scientific classification
- Kingdom: Animalia
- Phylum: Chordata
- Class: Actinopterygii
- Order: Cichliformes
- Family: Cichlidae
- Genus: Maylandia
- Species: M. chrysomallos

Binomial name
- Maylandia chrysomallos (Stauffer, Bowers, Kellogg & McKaye, 1997)

Synonyms
- Metriaclima chrysomallos Stauffer, Bowers, Kellogg & McKaye, 1997

Species of fish

Maylandia chrysomallos is a species of cichlid endemic to Lake Malawi where it is only known from rocky areas around Mumbo Island. This species can reach a length of 9 centimetres (3.5 in) SL. It is also found in the aquarium trade.
