= Maylandia barlowi =

Conservation status
- Least Concern (IUCN 3.1)

Scientific classification
- Kingdom: Animalia
- Phylum: Chordata
- Class: Actinopterygii
- Order: Cichliformes
- Family: Cichlidae
- Genus: Maylandia
- Species: M. barlowi

Binomial name
- Maylandia barlowi (McKaye & Stauffer, 1986)

Synonyms
- Pseudotropheus barlowi Mckaye & Stauffer, 1986; Metriaclima barlowi (Mckaye & Stauffer, 1986)

Species of fish

Maylandia barlowi is a species of cichlid endemic to Lake Malawi where it is only known from the area around the Maleri Islands where it prefers areas with soft substrates. This species can reach a length of 8.1 centimetres (3.2 in) SL. It is also found in the aquarium trade. The specific name of this species honours the ichthyologist George W. Barlow (1929–2007).
