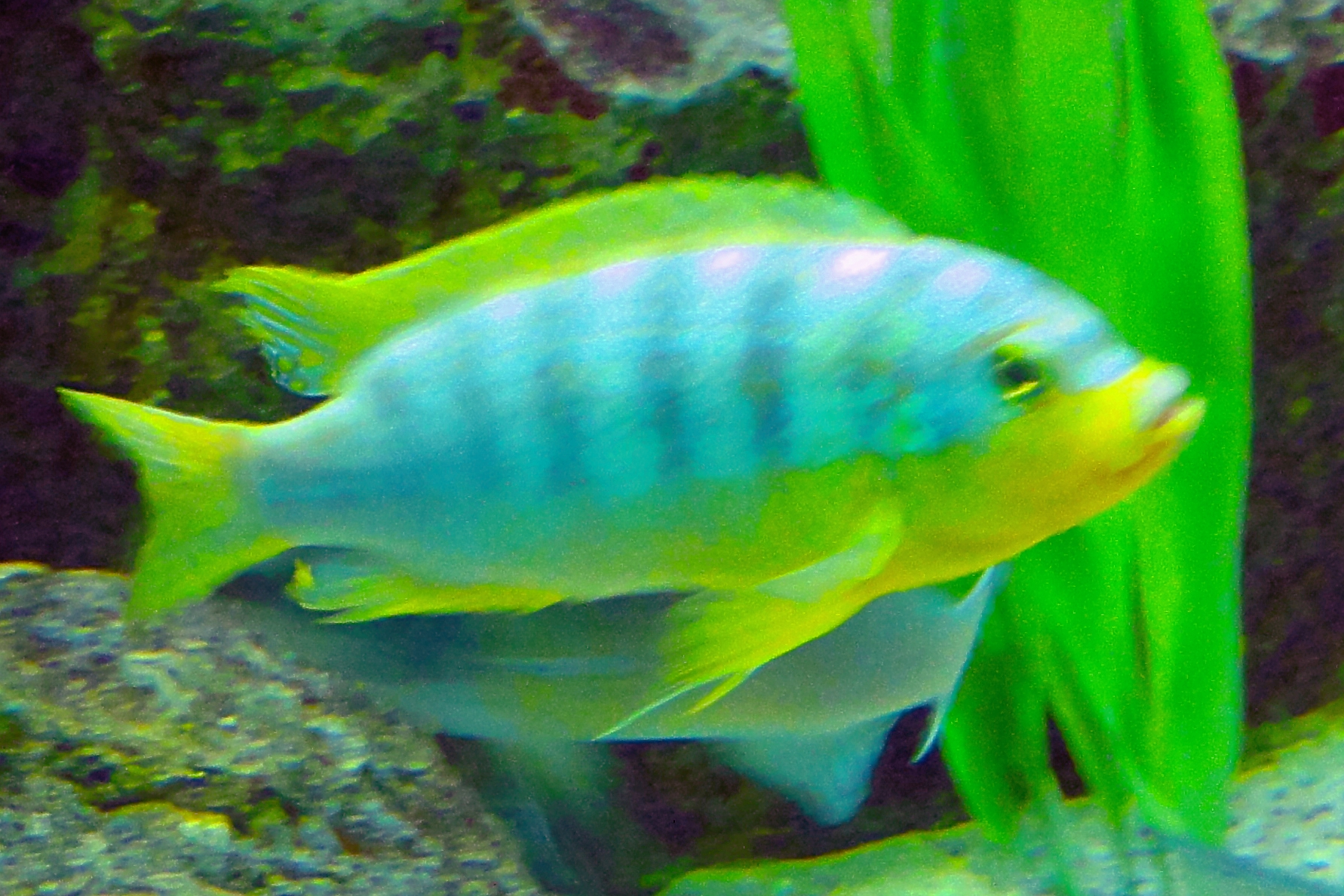
- Maylandia aurora

Conservation status
- Least Concern (IUCN 3.1)

Scientific classification
- Kingdom: Animalia
- Phylum: Chordata
- Class: Actinopterygii
- Order: Cichliformes
- Family: Cichlidae
- Genus: Maylandia
- Species: M. aurora

Binomial name
- Maylandia aurora (W. E. Burgess, 1976)

Synonyms
- Pseudotropheus aurora Burgess, 1976; Metriaclima aurora (Burgess, 1976)

= Maylandia aurora =

Species of fish

Maylandia aurora is a species of cichlid endemic to Lake Malawi where it is only known from the southern half of Likoma Island where it prefers habitats with rocky substrates close to sand. Males of this species can reach a length of 8.7 centimetres (3.4 in) SL while females reach 8 centimetres (3.1 in) SL. It is also found in the aquarium trade.
