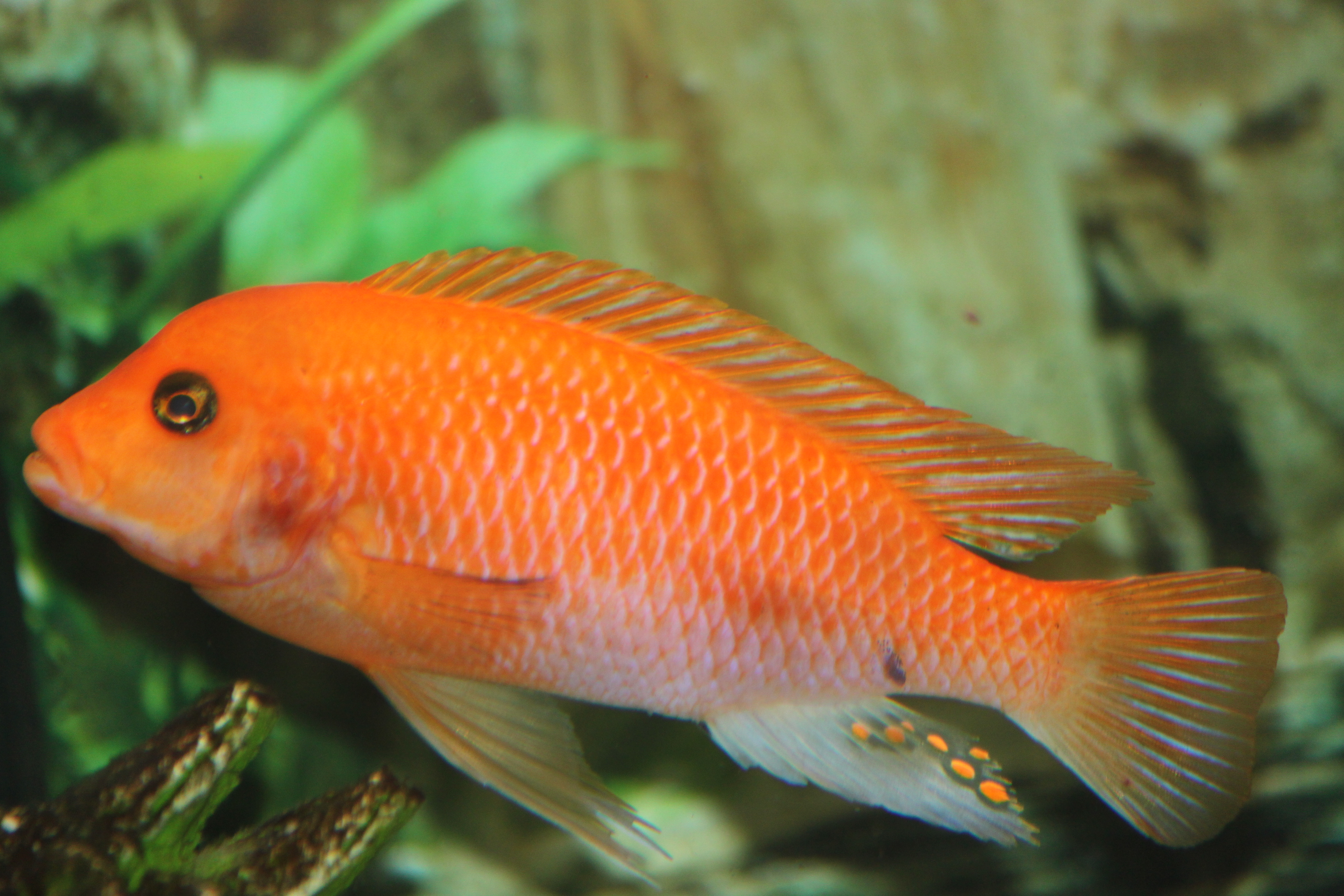

Conservation status
- Least Concern (IUCN 3.1)

Scientific classification
- Kingdom: Animalia
- Phylum: Chordata
- Class: Actinopterygii
- Order: Cichliformes
- Family: Cichlidae
- Genus: Maylandia
- Species: M. estherae

Binomial name
- Maylandia estherae (Konings, 1995)

Synonyms
- Metriaclima estherae (Konings, 1995); Pseudotropheus estherae Konings, 1995

= Maylandia estherae =

Red zebra

Species of fish

Maylandia estherae (the Red Zebra mbuna, Red Zebra Cichlid, or Esther Grant's Zebra) is a haplochromine cichlid. It is a rock dwelling fish or mbuna from Lake Malawi. This fish, like most cichlids from Lake Malawi, is a mouthbrooder - females hold their fertilized eggs then fry in their mouths until they are released after about 21 days.

== Taxonomy and naming ==
The genus name for this fish was once Pseudotropheus but that name is now restricted to different fish. Most ichthyological taxonomists place the species in Maylandia, though Ad Konings and thus much of the aquarium-related literature use Metriaclima instead. The specific name of this fish honours Esther Grant, the wife of the cichlid exporter Stuart M. Grant.

== Distribution ==
Maylandia estherae is endemic to Lake Malawi. Specifically, this species of freshwater tropical fish can be found along the eastern coast of the lake from Chilucha Reef near Metangula to Narungu.

== Description ==
Females can grow up to 10 cm (4 in) while males will grow up to 12.7 cm (5.0 in).

Despite their "red zebra" name, this species is polymorphic and can be found with different colors. The normal color of wild females is beige to brown while males are typically bright blue. However, red-orange females (O morph) as well as blotched females (OB morph) can be found in certain localities. O morph males (found only at Minos Reef) are white-pink colored with a tint of blue in the fins. OB males (so called "marmalade cats") are extremely rare in the wild.

Early exporters often selected the red females for the aquarium trade and used O-morph males to create a strain of orange-red males, making it the most commonly found variant from breeders and fish keepers.

== In the aquarium ==
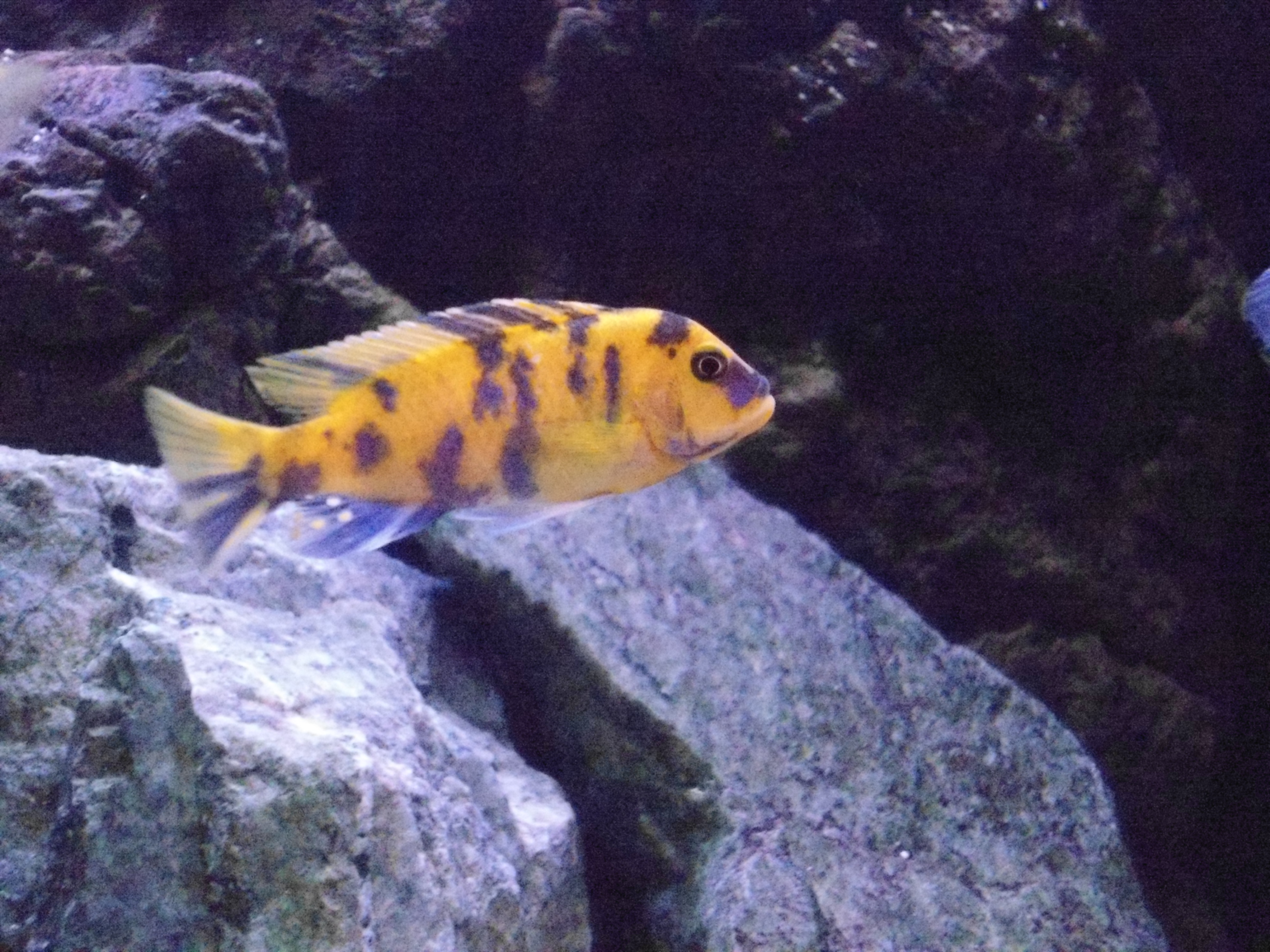
Adult female red zebra cichlid in an aquarium.

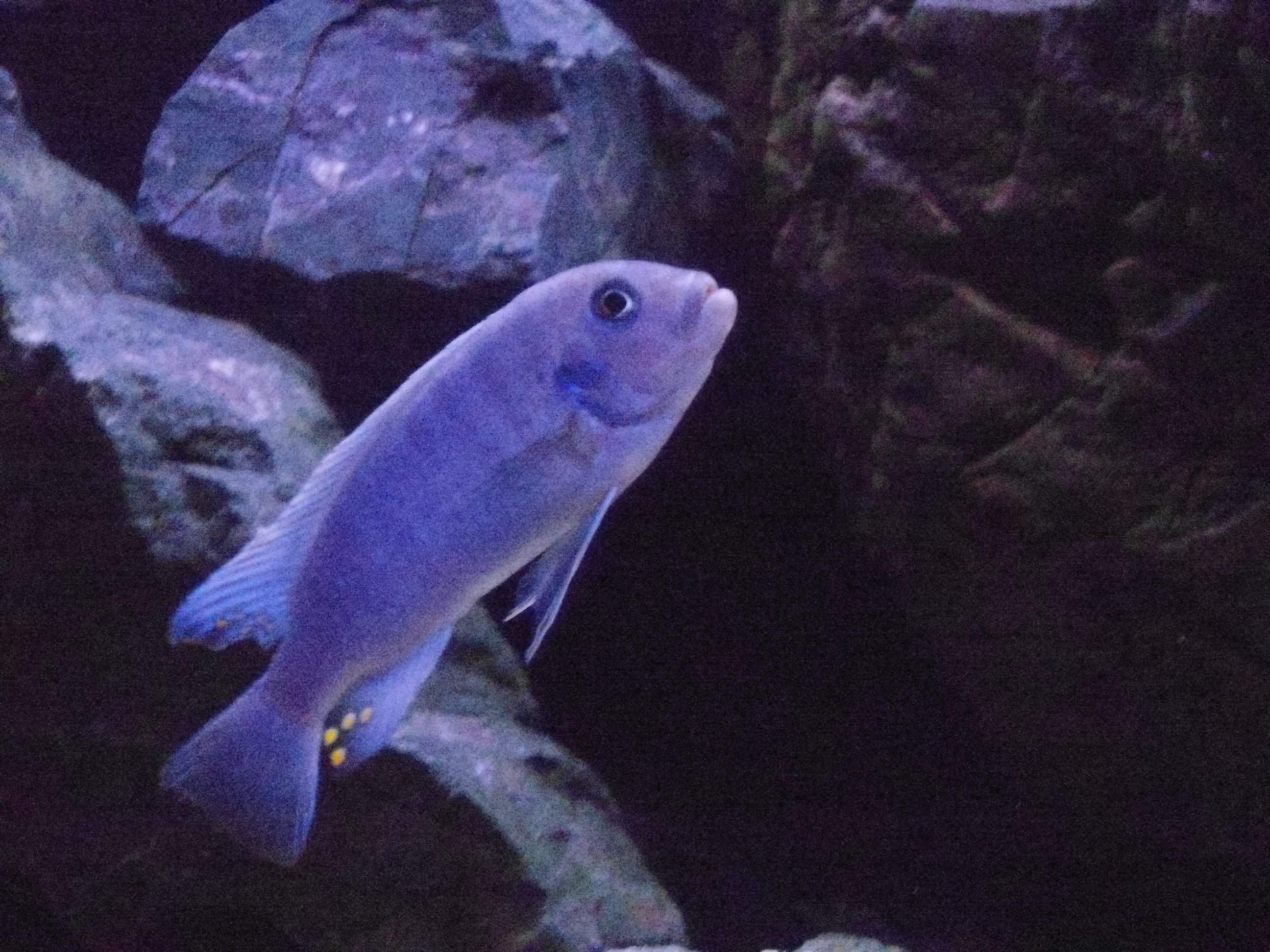
Adult male, blue morph

The males are territorial over the areas they prefer and those who reach dominance in an aquarium will pick on subordinate males and behave territorially in general. Like the other cichlids of this genus, they are best kept in a harem with one male to many females. Like any cichlid, it is recommended to house red zebra cichlids in rather large tanks with several other African cichlids. One should exercise caution when selecting tank mates because even if one takes care to only house a red zebra with other cichlids, South American cichlids and African cichlids are often unable to share a community tank in peace (though it is completely within the realm of reason for an experienced aquarium keeper to make this work). In addition, every keeper of the red zebra cichlid should be mindful of their preference for rocky terrain with numerous hiding places — for both smaller, weaker fish to seek shelter, and for the red zebra(s) to claim as their territory.

This is a species known to "arrange" substrate pebbles, small plants, and other aquarium decor far more often than other aquarium fish. This means keepers of red zebra cichlids often find their desired tank aesthetic slowly altered by this fish to maximize its comfort in the tank. It is often a pointless exercise to undo the arrangements of a red zebra, as they will readily overrule the keeper by moving everything back into the arrangement they desire. Oftentimes, the red zebra will seek to maximize the size of their chosen "home" by creating a pit in the substrate underneath covered shelter. Proficient in using their mouth as a tool, like most cichlids, red zebras will also pick up pebbles/rocks with their mouths for the purpose of "building" up areas they want covered up or elevated. One such example is to wall up secondary entrances to their favorite "dwelling" in an effort to make it more private. Because the fish is so active in terms of "renovating" their aquariums with their mouths, keepers must make sure the substrate within red zebra aquariums is smooth and of high quality to avoid injury.

The fish's predominate food source is algae and other plant life when in its natural habitat of Lake Malawi, though those in aquariums will certainly eat typical cichlid foods, some vegetable greens, and small, freeze-dried aquatic fauna as a treat. They should not be fed live foods by their keeper or there will be a risk for bloating, which can prove fatal. High protein foods typically sold for cichlids are unnecessary for red zebras as they grow to their relatively small adult size quickly. Like other cichlids, they thrive in waters that are between a pH of 7.5-8.5, hard 150–200 mg/L, and 72-82 degrees F (22-26 degrees C). Red zebra cichlids are rather hardy and can tolerate less than ideal water conditions, but keepers should seek the conditions listed above in order for the red zebra to live a healthy, active life.

== See also ==
- Cichlid
- Tropical fish
- Mbuna
- List of freshwater aquarium fish species
