= Iodotropheus stuartgranti =

Conservation status
- Least Concern (IUCN 3.1)

Scientific classification
- Kingdom: Animalia
- Phylum: Chordata
- Class: Actinopterygii
- Order: Cichliformes
- Family: Cichlidae
- Genus: Iodotropheus
- Species: I. stuartgranti

Binomial name
- Iodotropheus stuartgranti Konings, 1990

Species of fish

Iodotropheus stuartgranti is a species of cichlid endemic to Lake Malawi. It can also be found in the aquarium trade. This species can reach a length of 10 centimetres (3.9 in) TL. The specific name honours Stuart M. Grant (1937-2007), an exporter of cichlids from lake Malawi for the aquarium trade. This species feeds mainly on aufwuchs. The males are territorial and the female will lay anywhere within a male's territory.
