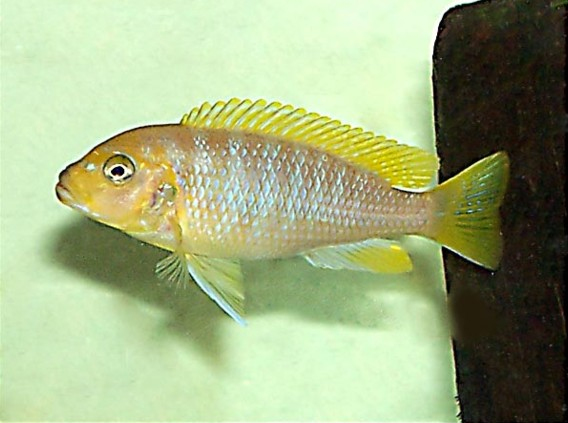

Conservation status
- Least Concern (IUCN 3.1)

Scientific classification
- Kingdom: Animalia
- Phylum: Chordata
- Class: Actinopterygii
- Order: Cichliformes
- Family: Cichlidae
- Genus: Maylandia
- Species: M. hajomaylandi

Binomial name
- Maylandia hajomaylandi (M. K. Meyer & Schartl, 1984)

Synonyms
- Maylandia hayomaylandi (lapsus); Metriaclima hajomaylandi (M. K. Meyer & Schartl, 1984); Metriaclima hayomaylandi (lapsus)

= Maylandia hajomaylandi =

Species of fish

Maylandia hajomaylandi is a species of cichlid endemic to Lake Malawi where it is only known from around Chisumulu Island. This species can reach a length of 12 centimetres (4.7 in) TL. It can also be found in the aquarium trade. The specific name honours the cichlid enthusiast and author about aquaria Hans Joachim Mayland, who died in 2004,
