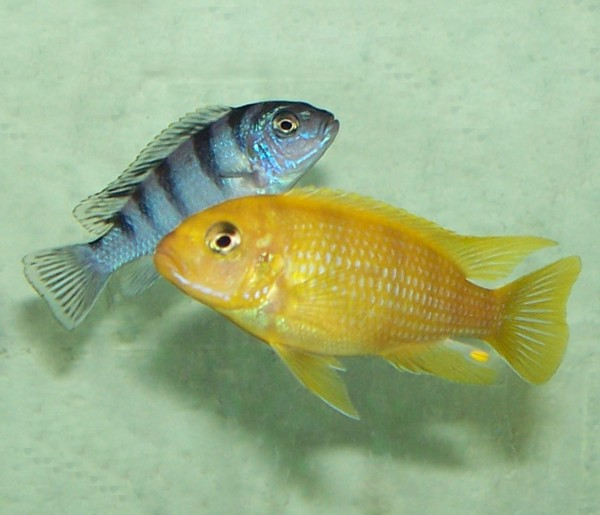
- male (front) and female (back)

Conservation status
- Least Concern (IUCN 3.1)

Scientific classification
- Kingdom: Animalia
- Phylum: Chordata
- Class: Actinopterygii
- Order: Cichliformes
- Family: Cichlidae
- Genus: Maylandia
- Species: M. lombardoi

Binomial name
- Maylandia lombardoi (W. E. Burgess, 1977)

Synonyms
- Pseudotropheus lombardoi Burgess, 1977; Metriaclima lombardoi (Burgess, 1977)

= Maylandia lombardoi =

Species of fish

Maylandia lombardoi, is a 13 centimetres (5.1 in) long freshwater fish from the family Cichlidae. This species is popular in the aquarium hobby where it is sold under a variety of common names including: lombardoi mbuna, kenyi mbuna or kennyi mbuna or kenyi cichlid. This species is sometimes seen in the genus Metriaclima owing to a dispute in which a minority of cichlid researchers do not consider Maylandia valid (see Maylandia for discussion. The specific name honours the exotic fish dealer John Lombardo.

== Distribution and habitat ==
It is endemic to the rocky shores of Mbenji Island, Lake Malawi in east Africa. The species is highly sexually dimorphic, females and juvenile males are pale white-blue with several blue-black vertical bands extending into the dorsal fin. Adult males turn bright yellow with faint brown bars crossing the body; fins are plain yellow with egg spots on the anal fin.

== In the aquarium ==
Kenyi cichlids are often found in the aquarium hobby. They are often kept in single-species tanks or with other similar Mbunas.

== Reproduction ==
Like most mbuna cichlids, this species is a maternal mouthbrooder. When mouthbrooding, females may defend a small territory and assume the colouration of males.

== Images of Kenyi cichlids ==
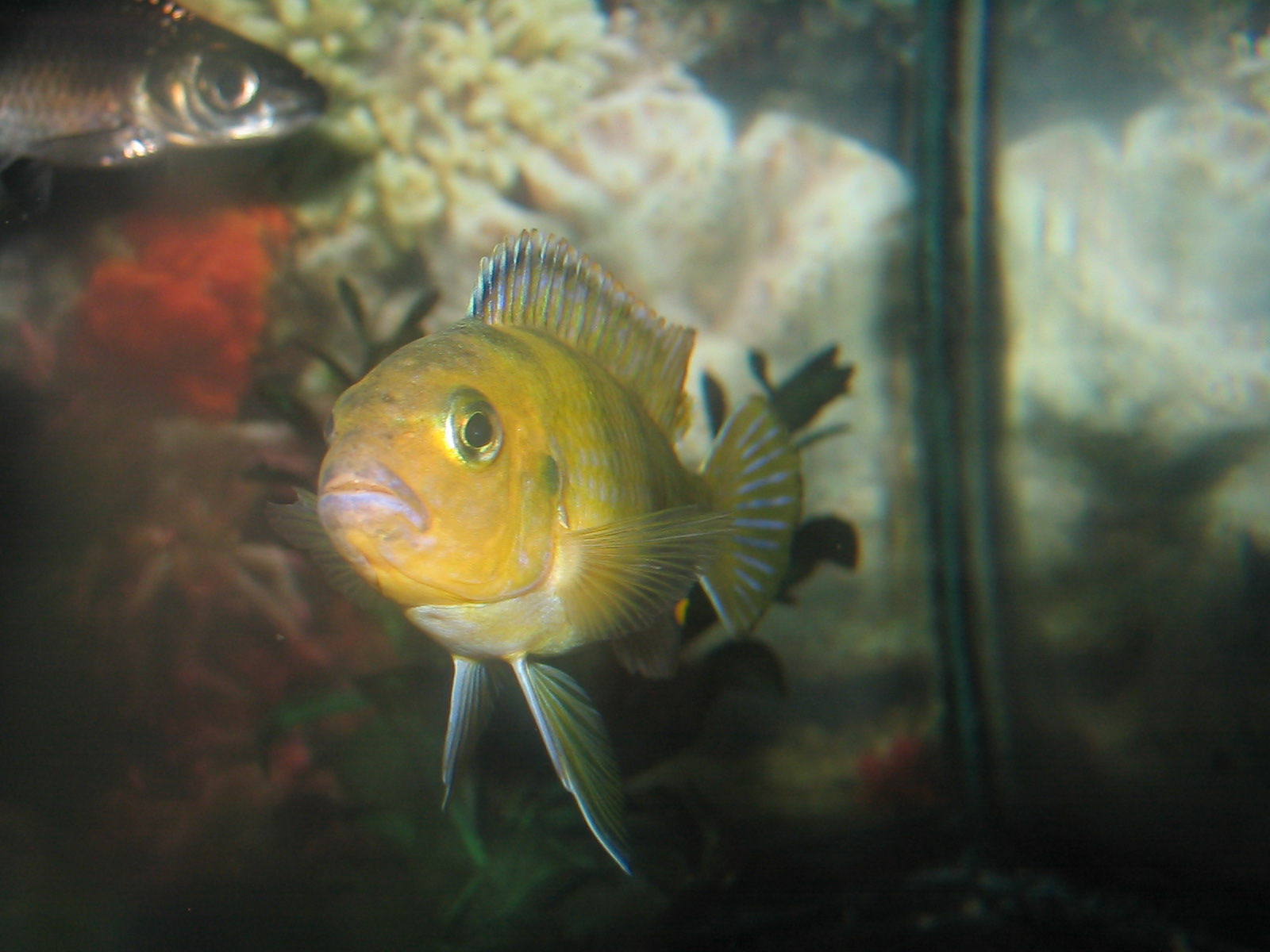
A male M. lombardoi in an aquarium.

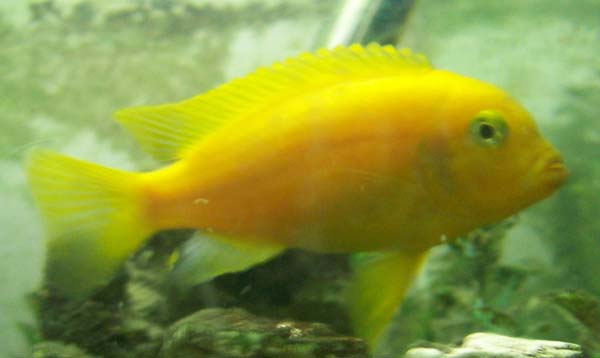
M. lombardoi male.

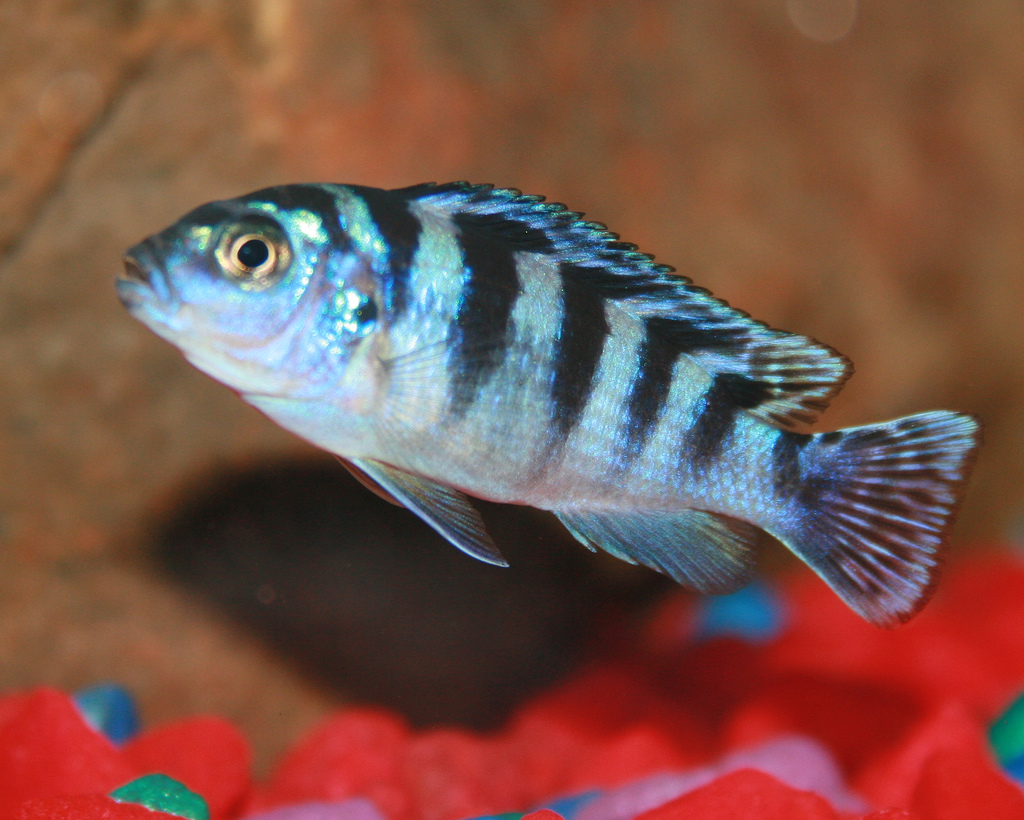
A female M. lombardoi in an aquarium.

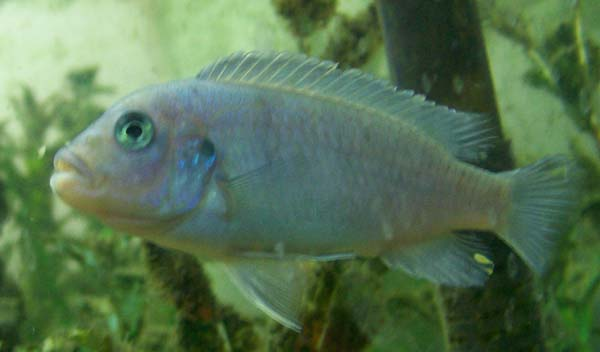
A male M. lombardoi with faint stripes.

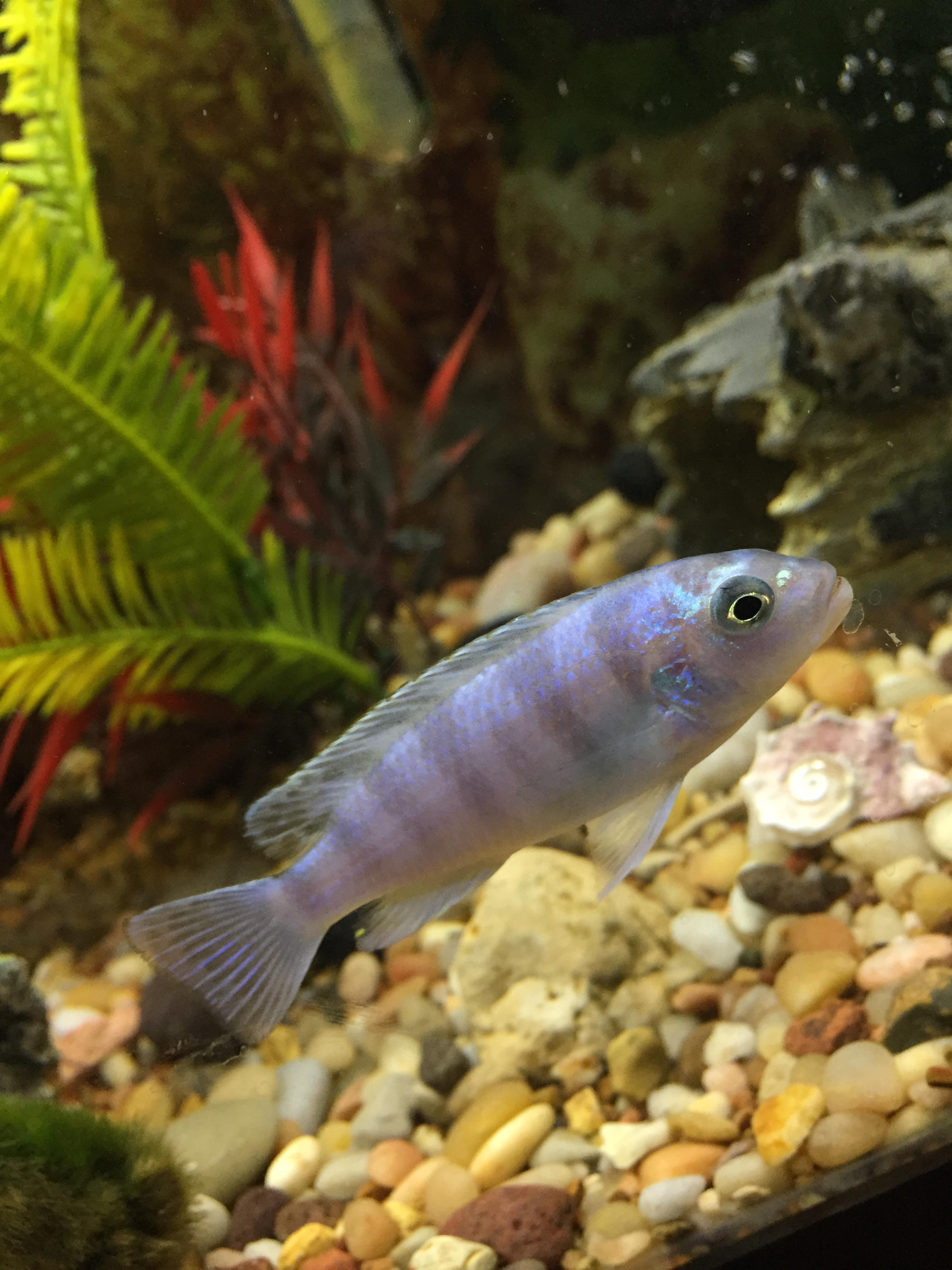
Juvenile male M. Lombardoi with faint stripes.

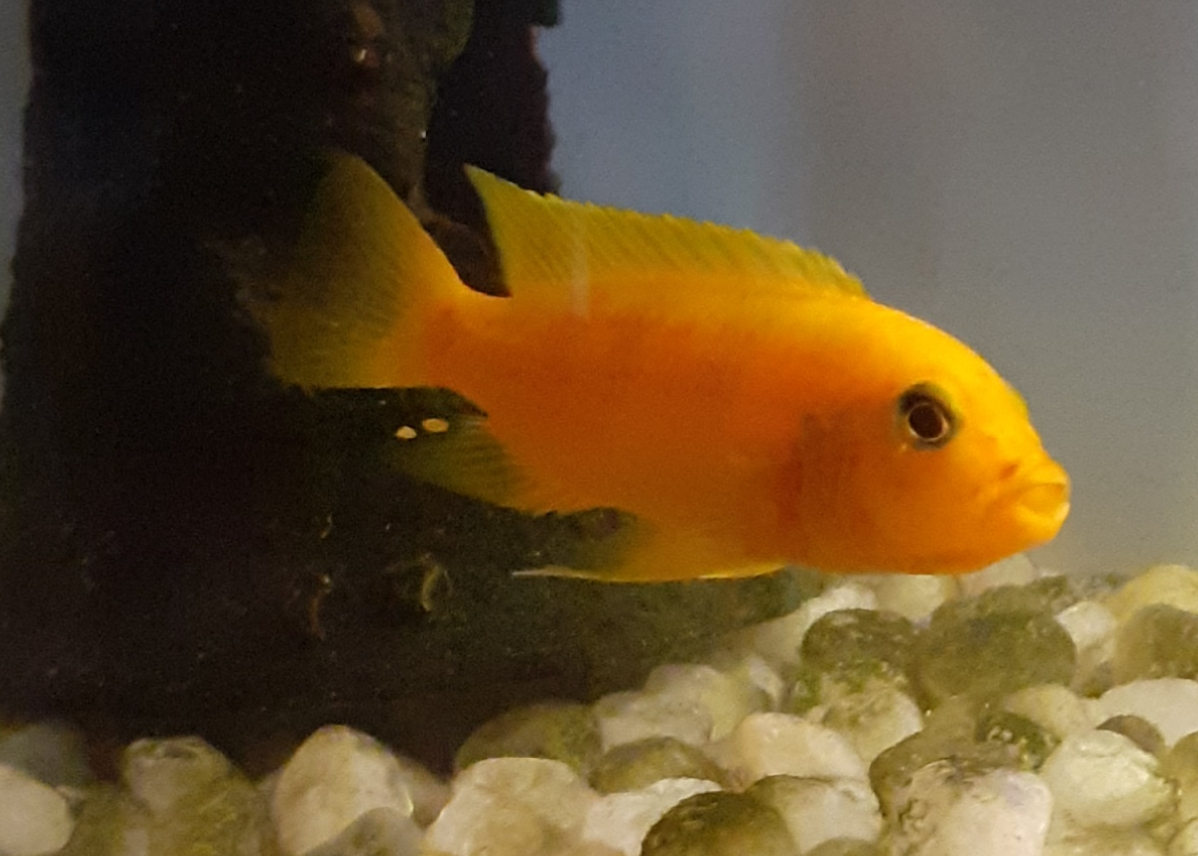
A male kenyi cichlid (M.Lombardoi) in an aquarium

== See also ==
- Mbuna
- List of freshwater aquarium fish species
