= Maylandia lanisticola =

Conservation status
- Least Concern (IUCN 3.1)

Scientific classification
- Kingdom: Animalia
- Phylum: Chordata
- Class: Actinopterygii
- Order: Cichliformes
- Family: Cichlidae
- Genus: Maylandia
- Species: M. lanisticola

Binomial name
- Maylandia lanisticola (W. E. Burgess, 1976)

Synonyms
- Pseudotropheus lanisticola Burgess 1976; Maylandia pursa Stauffer, 1991

Species of fish

Maylandia lanisticola is a species of cichlid endemic to Lake Malawi. It can also be found in the aquarium trade. This species is alternatively classified in the genus Pseudotropheus.
