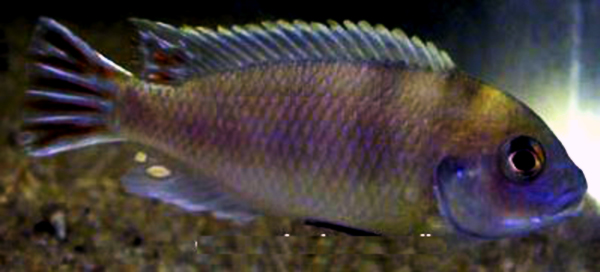

Conservation status
- Least Concern (IUCN 3.1)

Scientific classification
- Kingdom: Animalia
- Phylum: Chordata
- Class: Actinopterygii
- Division: Teleostei
- Order: Cichliformes
- Family: Cichlidae
- Genus: Maylandia
- Species: M. livingstonii

Binomial name
- Maylandia livingstonii (Boulenger, 1899)

Synonyms
- Tilapia livingstonii Boulenger, 1899; Metriaclima livingstonii (Boulenger, 1899); Pseudotropheus livingstonii (Boulenger, 1899)

= Maylandia livingstonii =

Species of fish

Maylandia livingstonii is a species of cichlid native to Lake Malawi and Lake Malombe. This species can reach a length of 15 centimetres (5.9 in) TL. It can also be found in the aquarium trade. The specific name of this fish honours the Scottish explorer and missionary David Livingstone (1813-1873).
