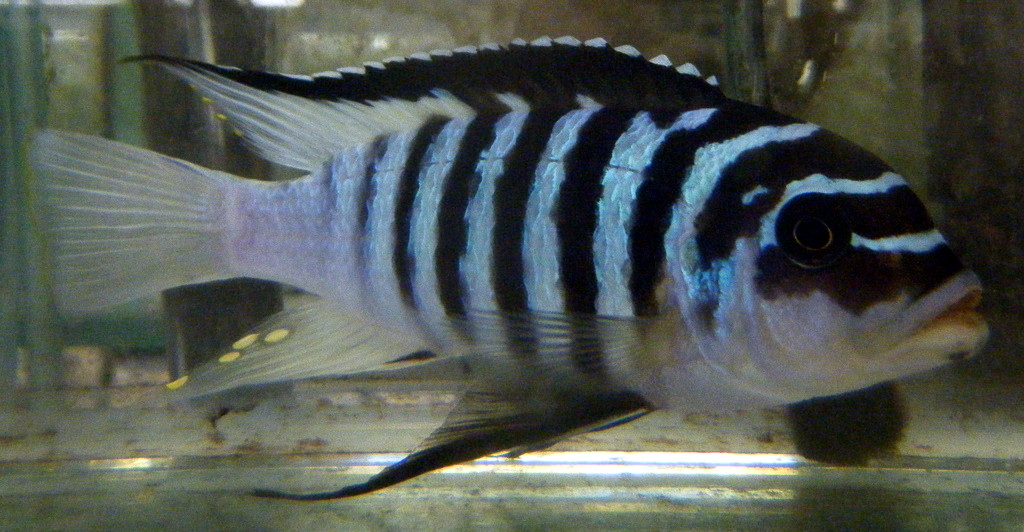

Conservation status
- Least Concern (IUCN 3.1)

Scientific classification
- Kingdom: Animalia
- Phylum: Chordata
- Class: Actinopterygii
- Order: Cichliformes
- Family: Cichlidae
- Genus: Maylandia
- Species: M. fainzilberi

Binomial name
- Maylandia fainzilberi Staeck, 1976

Synonyms
- Pseudotropheus fainzilberi (Staeck, 1976); Metriaclima fainzilberi (Staeck, 1976)

= Maylandia fainzilberi =

Species of fish

Maylandia fainzilberi is a species of cichlid endemic to Lake Malawi. It can reach a length of 12.9 centimetres (5.1 in) TL. It can also be found in the aquarium trade. The honours the tropical fish dealer Misha Fainzilber who helped the author, Wolfgang Staeck, gain access to Lake Malawi.
