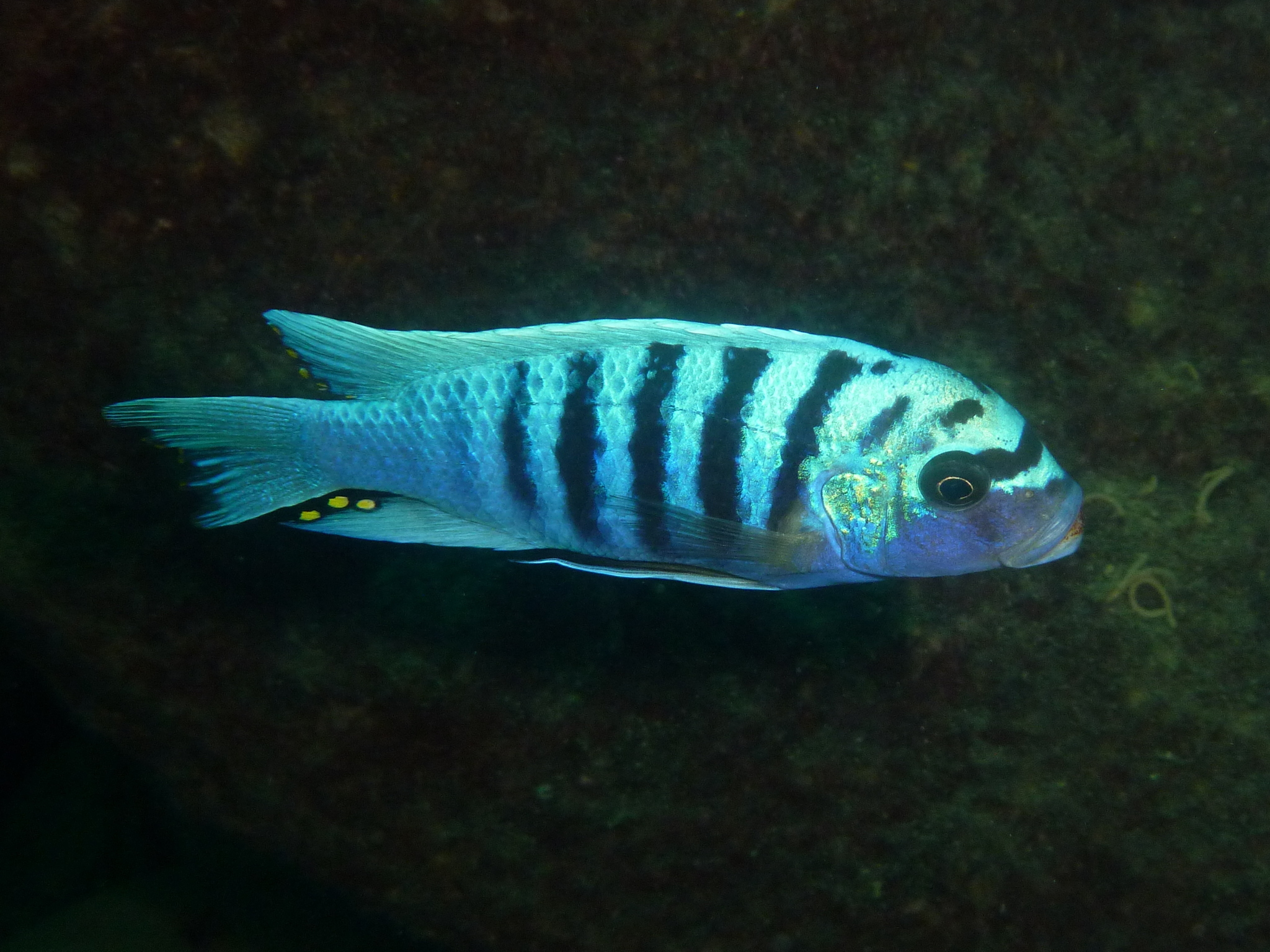
- Male zebra mbuna

Conservation status
- Least Concern (IUCN 3.1)

Scientific classification
- Kingdom: Animalia
- Phylum: Chordata
- Class: Actinopterygii
- Order: Cichliformes
- Family: Cichlidae
- Genus: Maylandia
- Species: M. zebra

Binomial name
- Maylandia zebra (Boulenger, 1899)

Synonyms
- Maylandia melabranchion (Stauffer, Bowers, Kellogg & McKaye, 1997); Metriaclima melabranchion Stauffer, Bowers, Kellogg & McKaye, 1997; Metriaclima zebra (Boulenger, 1899); Pseudotropheus zebra (Boulenger, 1899); Tilapia zebra Boulenger, 1899

= Zebra mbuna =

Species of fish

The zebra mbuna (Maylandia zebra) is a species of cichlid endemic to Lake Malawi in Africa. This species can reach a length of 11.3 cm (4.4 in). It feeds on aufwuchs, a surface layer of mostly algal material that grows on rocks. This cichlid is a mouthbrooder and the female broods the eggs in her mouth for about three weeks. This fish can sometimes be found in the aquarium trade.

== Description ==
The zebra mbuna has a single dorsal fin with sixteen to nineteen spines and seven to ten soft rays. The anal fin has three to four spines and six to nine soft rays. It grows to a maximum length of 11.3 cm (4.4 in) SL. The male fish varies in colour in different parts of its range, in some locations having a dark head, throat and belly and in others a blue head, whitish throat and grey/blue belly. In both cases the body is bright blue with up to eight grey/black bars, the dorsal fin is blue and the anal fin is blue to grey, with one to five orange to yellow spots. The female zebra mbuna is polymorphic, that is to say it occurs in two different colour forms. In one morph the head and body colour is pale brownish-grey, with similar coloured dorsal, anal and caudal fins, the pectoral fins have grey rays and clear membranes, and the black pelvic fins have white leading edges. In the other colour morph the throat is brown and the head and body are dark brown to black, the body having blue highlights. The dorsal and caudal fins are a similar brown/black colour and so are the anal fins, but on them, the trailing edges have a number of yellow spots. The pectorals have brown rays and clear membranes, and the black pelvic fins have white leading edges.

== Distribution and habitat ==
The zebra mbuna is endemic to Lake Malawi where it is found in rocky areas, both where there is sediment and where the rock is bare at depths between 6 and 28 m (20 and 92 ft).

== Biology ==
The zebra mbuna largely feeds on aufwuchs, an algae-based community of organisms adhering to rock surfaces. It also consumes zooplankton and small invertebrates. Its mobile mouth is at the tip of its snout with bicuspid teeth at the front and widely spaced tricuspid teeth behind. It holds its body at right angles to the rock and presses its mouth against the surface, repeatedly opening and closing it, and these actions scrape off the loose aufwuchs which it then ingests.

The zebra mbuna is a maternal mouth brooding cichlid. The female broods the eggs and early stage young in her mouth for 18 to 24 days. During this time she is unable to feed and she loses weight. When mature enough, the fry are expelled into the open water and quickly find natural shelter in which to hide. A study by Pierottia et al. (2008) investigated whether the colour morph of the female influenced the male's choice of mate. It was found that the male's preference in mate colouring was best predicted by the colour morph of his mother and that he was not influenced in his choice by his rearing experience.

== Use in aquaria ==
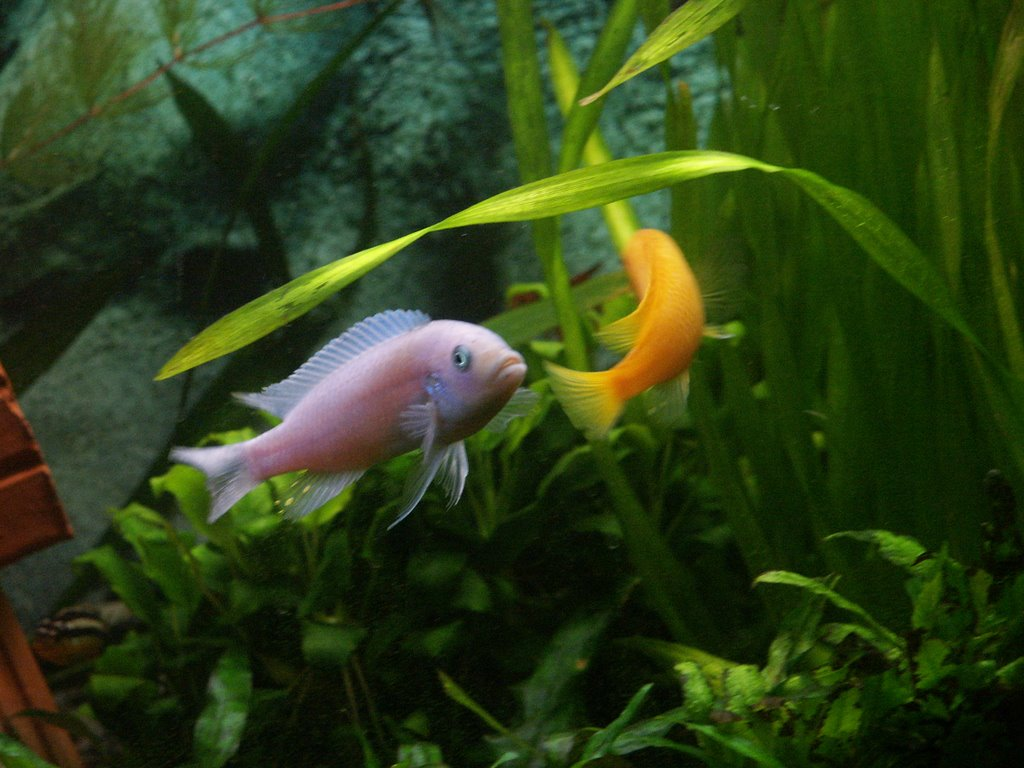
Zebra mbuna

This fish is popular for the aquarium trade.

== Genome ==
A draft nuclear genome assembly of Maylandia zebra was first published in 2008. A second, independent draft genome was also published in 2014 and subsequently improved upon in 2015 with Pacific Biosciences single-molecule real-time sequencing.
