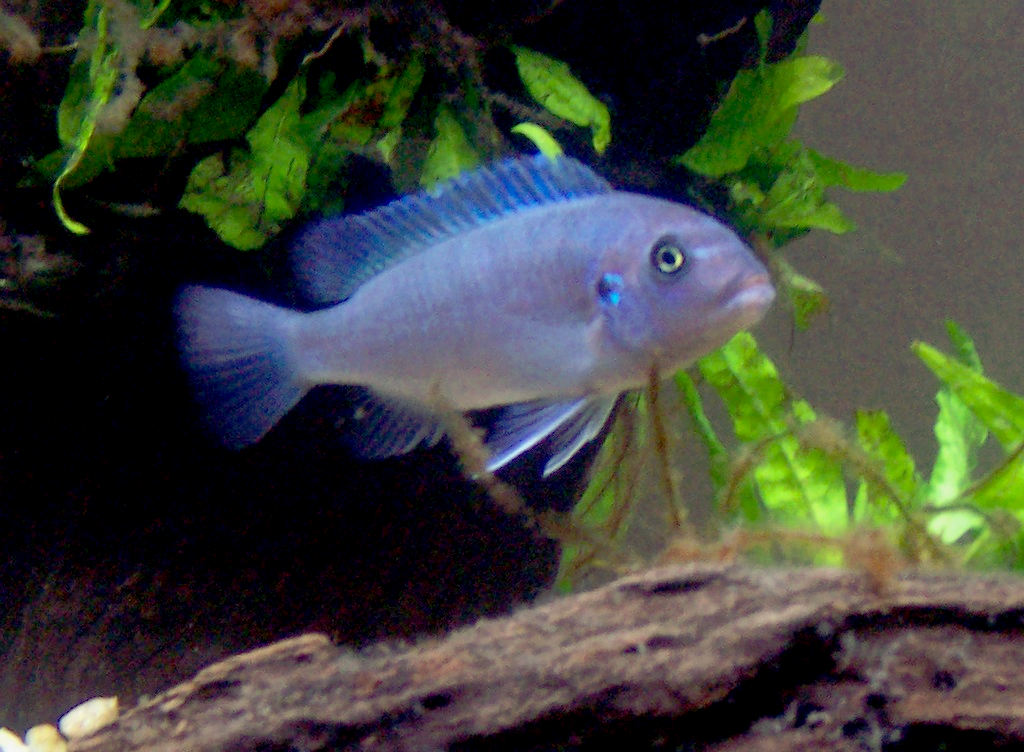

Conservation status
- Least Concern (IUCN 3.1)

Scientific classification
- Kingdom: Animalia
- Phylum: Chordata
- Class: Actinopterygii
- Order: Cichliformes
- Family: Cichlidae
- Genus: Maylandia
- Species: M. callainos

Binomial name
- Maylandia callainos (Stauffer & Hert, 1992)

Synonyms
- Pseudotropheus callainos Stauffer & Hert, 1992; Metriaclima callainos (Stauffer & Hert, 1992)

= Maylandia callainos =

Species of fish

Maylandia callainos (sometimes referred to as cobalt zebra, cobalt blue mbuna or cobalt blue zebra cichlid) is a species of cichlid endemic to Lake Malawi where they only occurred naturally in Nkhata Bay though it has now been introduced to other locations. This species can reach a length of 8 centimetres (3.1 in) SL. It can also be found in the aquarium trade. Maylandia callainos was formally named Pseudotropheus callainos and is often referred as such in the scientific literature.

== See also ==
- List of freshwater aquarium fish species
