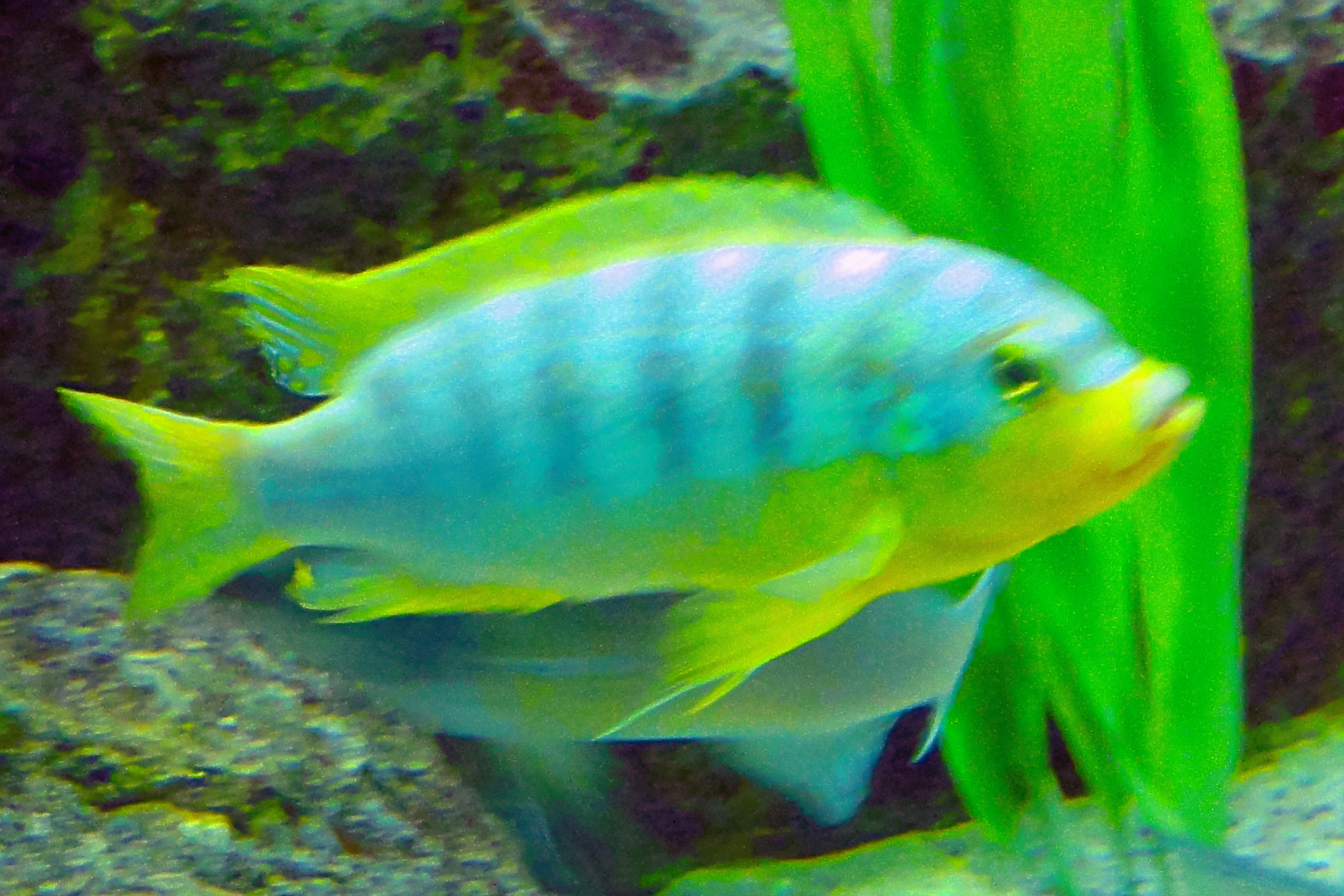

Conservation status
- Near Threatened (IUCN 3.1)

Scientific classification
- Kingdom: Animalia
- Phylum: Chordata
- Class: Actinopterygii
- Order: Cichliformes
- Family: Cichlidae
- Genus: Maylandia
- Species: M. greshakei

Binomial name
- Maylandia greshakei (M. K. Meyer & W. Förster, 1984)

Synonyms
- Metriaclima greshakei (M. K. Meyer & W. Förster, 1984); Pseudotropheus greshakei M. K. Meyer & W. Förster, 1984

= William's mbuna =

Species of fish

William's mbuna (Maylandia greshakei), also known as ice blue zebra mbuna or ice blue zebra or the Pseudotropheus ice blue among the aquarium enthusiasts, is a species of cichlid fish endemic to Lake Malawi where it is only found at Makokola in the southeastern arm of the lake. This species can reach a length of 13.4 centimetres (5.3 in) TL. It can also be found in the aquarium trade. The specific name honours the German ornamental fish importer Alfons Greshake.
