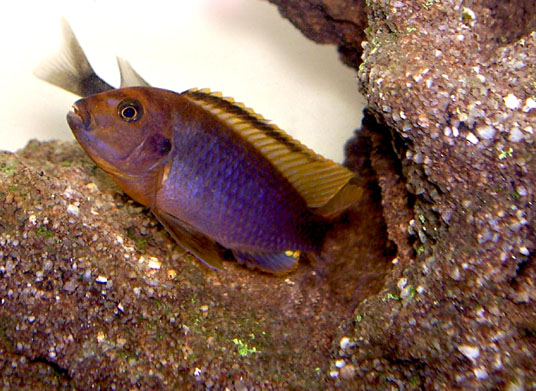

Conservation status
- Near Threatened (IUCN 3.1)

Scientific classification
- Kingdom: Animalia
- Phylum: Chordata
- Class: Actinopterygii
- Order: Cichliformes
- Family: Cichlidae
- Genus: Iodotropheus
- Species: I. sprengerae

Binomial name
- Iodotropheus sprengerae M. K. Oliver & Loiselle, 1972

Synonyms
- Iodochromis sprengerae (Oliver & Loiselle, 1972); Iodotropheus declivitas Stauffer, 1994

= Iodotropheus sprengerae =

Rusty cichlid

Species of fish

Iodotropheus sprengerae, the rusty cichlid, lavender mbuna or lavender cichlid, is a species of cichlid endemic to the Boadzulu and Chinyankwazi Islands and Chinyamwezi Island regions of Lake Malawi. It prefers a temperature range of 24–26 °C (75–79 °F).

Rusty cichlids are elongate fish that can grow up to 10.8 centimetres (4.3 in) SL. Juveniles and females are rusty brown color, while mature males have lavender purple hue.

Rusty cichlids are mouthbrooders. Females hold their fertilized eggs and fry, in their mouth for a few weeks before releasing the fry.

Rusty cichlids are endemic to Lake Malawi where it is apparently restricted to islands and reefs in the southeastern arm of the lake. The restricted distribution and the effects of the aquarium trade and increased sedimentation on this fish are unknown. The IUCN list this species as Near Threatened.

This species is named in honour of Kappy Sprenger, an aquarist, author and artist from Los Gatos, California, whose efforts to have this fish correctly identified led to the realisation that this was an undescribed species.

== Aquarium care ==
Although not entirely a peaceful fish, the rusty cichlid is considered one of the least aggressive among the mbuna cichlids. This quality makes rusty cichlids an ideal starter fish for aquarists with less experience keeping the mbuna. Hiding places and space should be provided or this fish will be bullied by their more aggressive tank mates. Rusty cichlids are omnivorous and will eat various kinds of food, but meaty food can often cause them serious digestive problems.

== See also ==
- Mbuna
- List of freshwater aquarium fish species
