= Jay Richard Stauffer Jr. =

Jay Stauffer Jr. is a Distinguished Professor of Ichthyology at Pennsylvania State University.

He received his BS from Cornell University in 1972 and his Ph.D. from the Virginia Polytechnic Institute and State University in 1975. From April 1975 until June 1984 he was an assistance professor for Appalachian Environmental Laboratory, Center for Environmental and Estuarine Studies, at the University of Maryland. Since July 1984, he has been with the Penn State School of Forest Resources, first as an Associate Professor of Fishery Science from July 1984 to June 1988, then as a Professor of Ichthyology from July 1988 until December 2005, and as a Distinguished Professor of Ichthyology from January 2007 to the present. He was elected to the graduate faculty at the University of Maryland in the fall of 1978 and to the Pennsylvania State University Graduate Faculty in 1984.

He has published dozens of articles including:

- "River of the Dammed: Longitudinal changes in fish assemblages in response to dams" with Jonathan Freedman, B. D. Lorson, R.B. Taylor, R. F. Carline, J.R. Stauffer
- "Introgression in Lake Malaŵi: Increasing the Threat of Human Urogenital Schistosomiasis?" with Jay R Stauffer, Henry Madsen, David Rollinson
- "Prey species and size choice of the molluscivorous fish, black carp (Mylopharyngodon piceus)" N. M. Hung, J. R. Stauffer, H. Madsen

== Awards ==
- Phi Sigma Award. 1974. For outstanding graduate research in the biological sciences at VPI & SU.
- Sigma Xi Research Award, 1974. For outstanding graduate students and promoting scholarly achievement.
- Fulbright Research Scholar 1990–1991 to Malawi, Africa
- Fulbright Research Scholar 1995 to Malawi, Africa

== Certifications and memberships ==
Professor Stauffer is certified as a Professional Fisheries Biologist by the American Fisheries Society. He is also a member of the American Institute of Fishery Research Biologists. He has the following affiliations as well:

- Association of Southeastern Biologists
- American Fisheries Society
- American Association of the Advancement of Science Sigma Xi
- Pennsylvania Academy of Sciences
- American Society of Ichthyologists and Herpetologists
- Ecological Society of America
- Potomac River Basin Commission
- Society of Systematic Zoologists
- American Institute of Biological Sciences
- American Society of Naturalists

== See also ==
- Category:Taxa named by Jay Richard Stauffer Jr.
