= List of vulnerable fishes =

- Extinct in the wild (EW): 11 species
- Critically endangered (CR): 906 species
- Endangered (EN): 1,533 species
- Vulnerable (VU): 1,740 species
- Near threatened (NT, LR/cd): 1,042 species
- Least concern (LC): 18,621 species
- Data deficient (DD): 5,492 species
Fish species (IUCN, 2025-2)
- 29,447 extant species have been evaluated
- 23,955 of those are fully assessed (Note: excludes data deficient evaluations.)
- 19,663 are not threatened at present
- 4,292 to 9,784 are threatened (Note: Threatened comprises CR, EN and VU. Upper estimate additionally includes DD.)
- 113 to 268 are extinct or extinct in the wild:
  - 102 extinct (EX) species (Note: Chart omits extinct (EX) species)
  - 11 extinct in the wild (EW)
  - 147 possibly extinct [CR(PE)]
  - 8 possibly extinct in the wild [CR(PEW)]

Vulnerable (VU) species are considered to be facing a high risk of extinction in the wild.

In September 2016, the International Union for Conservation of Nature (IUCN) listed 1245 vulnerable fish species. Of all evaluated fish species, 8.1% are listed as vulnerable. The IUCN also lists eight fish subspecies as vulnerable.

Of the subpopulations of fishes evaluated by the IUCN, 18 species subpopulations have been assessed as vulnerable.

For a species to be assessed as vulnerable to extinction the best available evidence must meet quantitative criteria set by the IUCN designed to reflect "a high risk of extinction in the wild". Endangered and critically endangered species also meet the quantitative criteria of vulnerable species, and are listed separately. See: List of endangered fishes, List of critically endangered fishes. Vulnerable, endangered and critically endangered species are collectively referred to as threatened species by the IUCN.

Additionally 3191 fish species (21% of those evaluated) are listed as data deficient, meaning there is insufficient information for a full assessment of conservation status. As these species typically have small distributions and/or populations, they are intrinsically likely to be threatened, according to the IUCN. While the category of data deficient indicates that no assessment of extinction risk has been made for the taxa, the IUCN notes that it may be appropriate to give them "the same degree of attention as threatened taxa, at least until their status can be assessed."

This is a complete list of vulnerable fish species and subspecies evaluated by the IUCN. Species and subspecies which have vulnerable subpopulations (or stocks) are indicated.

== Lobe-finned fishes ==
- Indonesian coelacanth (Latimeria menadoensis)

== Cartilaginous fishes ==
Chondrichthyes includes sharks, rays, skates, and sawfish. There are 121 species and eight subpopulations of cartilaginous fish assessed as vulnerable.

=== Angelsharks ===
- Eastern angelshark (Squatina albipunctata)
- Pacific angelshark (Squatina californica)
- Japanese angelshark (Squatina japonica)
- Clouded angelshark (Squatina nebulosa)
- Ocellated angelshark (Squatina tergocellatoides)

=== Mackerel sharks ===
Species

- Bigeye thresher (Alopias superciliosus)
- Common thresher (Alopias vulpinus)
- Great white shark (Carcharodon carcharias)
- Porbeagle (Lamna nasus)

Subpopulations

- Shortfin mako shark (Isurus oxyrinchus) (2 subpopulations)

=== Rays and skates ===
There are 74 species and one subpopulation in the order Rajiformes assessed as vulnerable.

==== Guitarfish species ====
- Spotted shovelnose ray (Aptychotrema timorensis)
- Sharpnose guitarfish (Glaucostegus granulatus)
- Clubnose guitarfish (Glaucostegus thouin)
- Common shovelnose ray (Glaucostegus typus)
- White-spotted guitarfish (Rhinobatos albomaculatus)
- Taiwan guitarfish (Rhinobatos formosensis)
- Spineback guitarfish (Rhinobatos irvinei)
- Rhinobatos jimbaranensis
- Widenose guitarfish (Rhinobatos obtusus)
- Flathead guitarfish (Rhinobatos planiceps)
- Rhinobatos penggali
- Shortnose guitarfish (Zapteryx brevirostris)
- Southern banded guitarfish (Zapteryx xyster)

==== Whiptail stingrays ====
- Estuary stingray (Dasyatis fluviorum)
- Niger stingray (Dasyatis garouaensis)
- Izu stingray (Dasyatis izuensis)
- Yantai stingray (Dasyatis laevigata)
- Pale-edged stingray (Dasyatis zugei)
- Pink whipray (Himantura fai)
- Whitespotted whipray (Himantura gerrardi)
- Mangrove whipray (Himantura granulata)
- Hortle's whipray (Himantura hortlei)
- Jenkins' whipray (Himantura jenkinsii)
- Leopard whipray (Himantura leoparda)
- Tubemouth whipray (Himantura lobistoma)
- Round whipray (Himantura pastinacoides)
- Whitenose whipray (Himantura uarnacoides)
- Reticulate whipray (Himantura uarnak)
- Round ribbontail ray (Taeniurops meyeni)
- Sharpnose stingray (Telatrygon acutirostra)
- Porcupine ray (Urogymnus asperrimus)

==== Narcinids ====
Species

- Brazilian blind electric ray (Benthobatis kreffti)
- Taiwanese blind electric ray (Benthobatis yangi)
- Colombian electric ray (Diplobatis colombiensis)
- Brownband numbfish (Diplobatis guamachensis)
- Ocellated electric ray (Diplobatis ommata)
- Painted electric ray (Diplobatis pictus)
- Shortlip electric ray (Narcine brevilabiata)
- Giant electric ray (Narcine entemedor)
- Blackspotted numbfish (Narcine timlei)

Subpopulations

- Apron ray (Discopyge tschudii) (1 subpopulation)

==== Skates ====
- Thickbody skate (Amblyraja frerichsi)
- Thorny skate (Amblyraja radiata)
- Mottled skate (Beringraja pulchra)
- Sydney skate (Dipturus australis)
- Madagascar skate (Dipturus crosnieri)
- Thintail skate (Dipturus leptocaudus)
- South Brazilian skate (Dipturus mennii)
- Longnosed skate (Dipturus oxyrinchus)
- Dipturus trachydermus
- Onefin skate (Gurgesiella dorsalifera)
- Shagreen ray (Leucoraja fullonica)
- Ocellate spot skate (Okamejei kenojei)
- Bigeye skate (Okamejei meerdervoortii)
- Madeira skate (Raja maderensis)
- Melbourne skate (Spiniraja whitleyi)
- Large-nose ray (Zearaja chilensis)

==== Softnose skates ====
- Eyespot skate (Atlantoraja cyclophora)
- La Plata skate (Atlantoraja platana)
- Whitedotted skate (Bathyraja albomaculata)
- Rio skate (Rioraja agassizii)

==== Other Rajiformes species ====
- Ocellated eagle ray (Aetobatus ocellatus)
- Banded eagle ray (Aetomylaeus nichofii)
- Spiny butterfly ray (Gymnura altavela)
- Japanese butterfly ray (Gymnura japonica)
- Longtail butterfly ray (Gymnura poecilura)
- Zonetail butterfly ray (Gymnura zonura)
- Natal electric ray (Heteronarce garmani)
- Reef manta ray (Manta alfredi)
- Giant oceanic manta ray (Manta birostris)
- Manta de monk (Mobula munkiana)
- Lesser Guinean devil ray (Mobula rochebrunei)
- Box ray (Mobula tarapacana)
- Chilean eagle ray (Myliobatis chilensis)
- Southern eagle ray (Myliobatis goodei)
- Peruvian eagle ray (Myliobatis peruvianus)
- Japanese eagle ray (Myliobatis tobijei)
- Japanese sleeper ray (Narke japonica)
- Fanray (Platyrhina sinensis)
- Long-tailed river stingray (Plesiotrygon iwamae)
- Short-tailed river stingray (Potamotrygon brachyura)
- Xingu River ray (Potamotrygon leopoldi)
- Bowmouth guitarfish (Rhina ancylostoma)
- Cownose ray (Rhinoptera bonasus)
- Flapnose ray (Rhinoptera javanica)
- Finless sleeper ray (Temera hardwickii)
- Marbled electric ray (Torpedo marmorata)
- Common torpedo (Torpedo torpedo)
- Tumbes round stingray (Urobatis tumbesensis)
- Sandyback stingaree (Urolophus bucculentus)
- Yellowback stingaree (Urolophus sufflavus)
- Greenback stingaree (Urolophus viridis)
- Reticulate round stingray (Urotrygon reticulata)
- Fake round ray (Urotrygon simulatrix)
- Striped panray (Zanobatus schoenleinii)

=== Ground sharks ===
Species

- New Caledonia catshark (Aulohalaelurus kanakorum)
- Dusky catshark (Bythaelurus canescens)
- Silvertip shark (Carcharhinus albimarginatus)
- Graceful shark (Carcharhinus amblyrhynchoides)
- Pigeye shark (Carcharhinus amboinensis)
- Copper shark (Carcharhinus brachyurus)
- Spinner shark (Carcharhinus brevipinna)
- Silky shark (Carcharhinus falciformis)
- Smoothtooth blacktip shark (Carcharhinus leiodon)
- Bull shark (Carcharhinus leucas)
- Blacktip shark (Carcharhinus limbatus)
- Oceanic whitetip shark (Carcharhinus longimanus)
- Blacktip reef shark (Carcharhinus melanopterus)
- Dusky shark (Carcharhinus obscurus)
- Sandbar shark (Carcharhinus plumbeus)
- Blackspot shark (Carcharhinus sealei)
- Night shark (Carcharhinus signatus)
- Hooktooth shark (Chaenogaleus macrostoma)
- School shark (Galeorhinus galeus)
- Southern sawtail catshark (Galeus mincaronei)
- African sawtail catshark (Galeus polli)
- Speartooth shark (Glyphis glyphis)
- Speckled catshark (Halaelurus boesemani)
- Tiger catshark (Halaelurus natalensis)
- Brown shyshark (Haploblepharus fuscus)
- Sicklefin weasel shark (Hemigaleus microstoma)
- Snaggletooth shark (Hemipristis elongata)
- Ocellate topeshark (Hemitriakis complicofasciata)
- Barbeled houndshark (Leptocharias smithii)
- Sharptooth smooth-hound (Mustelus dorsalis)
- Common smooth-hound (Mustelus mustelus)
- Blackspotted smooth-hound (Mustelus punctulatus)
- Humpback smooth-hound (Mustelus whitneyi)
- White-fin smooth-hound (Mustelus widodoi)
- Sicklefin lemon shark (Negaprion acutidens)
- Lemon shark (Negaprion brevirostris)
- Whitetip weasel shark (Paragaleus leucolomatus)
- Slender weasel shark (Paragaleus randalli)
- Graceful catshark (Proscyllium habereri)
- Brazilian sharpnose shark (Rhizoprionodon lalandii)
- Pacific sharpnose shark (Rhizoprionodon longurio)
- Lizard catshark (Schroederichthys saurisqualus)
- Nursehound (Scyliorhinus stellaris)
- Flapnose houndshark (Scylliogaleus quecketti)
- Smalleye hammerhead (Sphyrna tudes)
- Smooth hammerhead (Sphyrna zygaena)
- Whitetip reef shark (Triaenodon obesus)
- Spotted houndshark (Triakis maculata)

Subpopulations

- Copper shark (Carcharhinus brachyurus) (1 subpopulation)
- Spinner shark (Carcharhinus brevipinna) (1 subpopulation)
- Blacktip shark (Carcharhinus limbatus) (1 subpopulation)
- Dusky shark (Carcharhinus obscurus) (1 subpopulation)
- Scalloped hammerhead (Sphyrna lewini) (2 subpopulations)

=== Carpet sharks ===
- Bluegrey carpetshark (Brachaelurus colcloughi)
- Burmese bamboo shark (Chiloscyllium burmensis)
- Grey bamboo shark (Chiloscyllium griseum)
- Slender bamboo shark (Chiloscyllium indicum)
- Taiwan saddled carpetshark (Cirrhoscyllium formosanum)
- Nurse shark (Ginglymostoma cirratum)
- Cenderawasih epaulette shark (Hemiscyllium galei)
- Henry's epaulette shark (Hemiscyllium henryi)
- Papuan epaulette shark (Hemiscyllium hallstromi)
- Michael's epaulette shark (Hemiscyllium michaeli)
- Hooded carpetshark (Hemiscyllium strahani)
- Tawny nurse shark (Nebrius ferrugineus)

=== Squaliformes ===
Species

- Lowfin gulper shark (Centrophorus lusitanicus)
- Smallfin gulper shark (Centrophorus moluccensis)
- Leafscale gulper shark (Centrophorus squamosus)
- Granular dogfish (Centroscyllium granulatum)
- Kitefin shark (Dalatias licha)
- Longsnout dogfish (Deania quadrispinosa)
- Angular roughshark (Oxynotus centrina)
- Japanese roughshark (Oxynotus japonicus)
- Sailfin roughshark (Oxynotus paradoxus)
- Largespine velvet dogfish (Proscymnodon macracanthus)
- Plunket shark (Proscymnodon plunketi)
- Japanese velvet dogfish (Scymnodon ichiharai)
- Knifetooth dogfish (Scymnodon ringens)
- Greenland shark (Somniosus microcephalus)
- Spiny dogfish (Squalus acanthias)
- Indonesian shortsnout spurdog (Squalus hemipinnis)
- Philippine spurdog (Squalus montalbani)

Subpopulations

- Spiny dogfish (Squalus acanthias) (2 subpopulations)

=== Other cartilaginous fish species ===
- Rabbit fish (Chimaera monstrosa)
- Silver chimaera (Chimaera phantasma)
- Striped rabbitfish (Hydrolagus matallanasi)
- Broadnose sevengill shark (Notorynchus cepedianus)

== Lampreys ==
- Miller Lake lamprey (Entosphenus minimus)
- Kern brook lamprey (Lampetra hubbsi)
- Chilean lamprey (Mordacia lapicida)

== Ray-finned fishes ==
There are 1114 species, eight subspecies, and four subpopulations of ray-finned fish assessed as vulnerable.

=== Acipenseriformes ===
Includes sturgeons and paddlefishes.

Species

- Shortnose sturgeon (Acipenser brevirostrum)
- Atlantic sturgeon (Acipenser oxyrinchus)
- White sturgeon (Acipenser transmontanus)
- American paddlefish (Polyodon spathula)
- Shovelnose sturgeon (Scaphirhynchus platorynchus)

=== Salmoniformes ===
Species

- Bernese whitefish (Coregonus albellus)
- Coregonus arenicolus
- Coregonus atterensis
- Spiny whitefish (Coregonus candidus)
- Powan (Coregonus clupeoides)
- Coregonus confusus
- Coregonus danneri
- Coregonus hoyi
- Atlantic whitefish (Coregonus huntsmani)
- Kiyi (Coregonus kiyi)
- Lavaret (Coregonus lavaretus)
- Coregonus lucinensis
- Maraene (Coregonus maraena)
- Coregonus subautumnalis
- Shortjaw cisco (Coregonus zenithicus)
- Siberian taimen (Hucho taimen)
- Mexican golden trout (Oncorhynchus chrysogaster)
- Salmo akairos
- Fibreno trout (Salmo fibreni)
- Sonaghen (Salmo nigripinnis)
- Salmo ohridanus
- Salmo pelagonicus
- Gillaroo (Salmo stomachicus)
- Bull trout (Salvelinus confluentus)
- Salvelinus evasus
- Salvelinus fimbriatus
- Salvelinus gracillimus
- Salvelinus killinensis
- Salvelinus mallochi
- Salvelinus maxillaris
- Salvelinus perisii
- Fjellfrøsvatn charr (Salvelinus sp. 'Fjellfrøsvatn')
- Salvelinus struanensis
- Salvelinus youngeri
- Salvethymus svetovidovi

Subpopulations

- Sockeye salmon (Oncorhynchus nerka) (3 subpopulations)

=== Silversides ===
- Lined silverside (Atherinomorus lineatus)
- Zona (Bedotia geayi)
- Bedotia marojejy
- Bedotia masoala
- Bedotia sp. 'Ankavia-Ankavanana'
- Bedotia sp. 'Bemarivo'
- Bedotia sp. 'Betampona'
- Bedotia sp. 'Lazana'
- Bedotia sp. 'Mahanara'
- Bedotia sp. 'Namorona'
- Bedotia sp. 'Nosivola'
- Cairns rainbowfish (Cairnsichthys rhombosomoides)
- Allen's rainbowfish (Chilatherina alleni)
- Bleher's rainbowfish (Chilatherina bleheri)
- Largetooth silverside (Chirostoma arge)
- Alberca silverside (Chirostoma bartoni)
- Darling River hardyhead (Craterocephalus amniculus)
- Dalhousie hardyhead (Craterocephalus dalhousiensis)
- Glover's hardyhead (Craterocephalus gloveri)
- Kutubu hardyhead (Craterocephalus lacustris)
- Red rainbowfish (Glossolepis incisus)
- Tami River rainbowfish (Glossolepis pseudoincisus)
- Ramu rainbowfish (Glossolepis ramuensis)
- Arfak rainbowfish (Melanotaenia arfakensis)
- Lake Eacham rainbowfish (Melanotaenia eachamensis)
- Lake Tebera rainbowfish (Melanotaenia herbertaxelrodi)
- Lake Kutubu rainbowfish (Melanotaenia lacustris)
- Ogilby's rainbowfish (Melanotaenia ogilbyi)
- Oktedi rainbowfish (Melanotaenia oktediensis)
- Papuan rainbowfish (Melanotaenia papuae)
- Lake Kurumoi rainbowfish (Melanotaenia parva)
- Pygmy rainbowfish (Melanotaenia pygmaea)
- Waccamaw silverside (Menidia extensa)
- Paratherina cyanea
- Paratherina labiosa
- Paratherina striata
- Paratherina wolterecki
- Phallostethus dunckeri
- Popondetta blue-eye (Pseudomugil connieae)
- Transparent blue-eye (Pseudomugil pellucidus)
- Katrana (Rheocles alaotrensis)
- Rheocles derhami
- Rheocles vatosoa
- Telmatherina abendanoni
- Telmatherina antoniae
- Telmatherina celebensis
- Celebes rainbow (Telmatherina ladigesi)
- Telmatherina obscura
- Telmatherina opudi
- Telmatherina prognatha
- Telmatherina sarasinorum
- Telmatherina wahjui
- Tominanga aurea
- Tominanga sanguicauda

=== Toothcarps ===
There are 85 species and three subspecies of toothcarp assessed as vulnerable.

==== Goodeids ====
- Bold characodon (Characodon audax)
- Dark-edged splitfin (Girardinichthys multiradiatus)
- Dusky splitfin (Goodea gracilis)

==== Pupfish species ====
- Railroad Valley springfish (Crenichthys nevadae)
- Leon Springs pupfish (Cyprinodon bovinus)
- Thicklip pupfish (Cyprinodon labiosus)
- Desert pupfish (Cyprinodon macularius)
- Maya pupfish (Cyprinodon maya)
- Amargosa pupfish (Cyprinodon nevadensis)
- Pecos pupfish (Cyprinodon pecosensis)
- Largefin pupfish (Cyprinodon verecundus)
- Orestias chungarensis
- Orestias ctenolepis
- Orestias olivaceus
- Orestias pentlandii
- Orestias silustani

==== Aplocheilids ====
- Pachypanchax arnoulti

==== Rivulids ====
- Anablepsoides lineasoppilatae
- Anablepsoides parlettei
- Aphyolebias obliquus
- Austrolebias affinis
- Santa Catarina sabrefin (Campellolebias brucei)
- Brasilia lyrefin (Cynolebias boitonei)
- Ginger pearlfish (Leptolebias marmoratus)
- Minute pearlfish (Leptolebias minimus)
- Opalescent pearlfish (Leptolebias opalescens)
- Splendid pearlfish (Leptolebias splendens)
- Simpsonichthys picturatus
- Spectrolebias pilleti

==== Nothobranchiids ====
Species

- Aphyosemion abacinum
- Golden killi (Aphyosemion aureum)
- Twostripe lyretail (Aphyosemion bivittatum)
- Sky-blue killi (Aphyosemion coeleste)
- Mbam killi (Aphyosemion dargei)
- Edea killi (Aphyosemion edeanum)
- Aphyosemion louessense
- Aphyosemion primigenium
- Aphyosemion rectogoense
- Aphyosemion schluppi
- Aphyosemion thysi
- Aphyosemion wildekampi
- Callopanchax monroviae
- Epiplatys guineensis
- Epiplatys hildegardae
- Redspotted panchax (Epiplatys lamottei)
- Epiplatys longiventralis
- Nimbapanchax petersi
- Nimbapanchax viridis
- Nothobranchius albimarginatus
- Nothobranchius annectens
- Boji Plains nothobranch (Nothobranchius bojiensis)
- Elongate nothobranch (Nothobranchius elongatus)
- Nothobranchius flammicomantis
- Nothobranchius foerschi
- Nothobranchius geminus
- Kikambala nothobranch (Nothobranchius interruptus)
- Nothobranchius kilomberoensis
- Nothobranchius korthausae
- Nothobranchius lourensi
- Nothobranchius luekei
- Nothobranchius rubripinnis
- Nothobranchius steinforti
- Mnanzini nothobranch (Nothobranchius willerti)
- Scriptaphyosemion schmitti

Subspecies

- Aphyosemion cameronense obscurum
- Epiplatys chaperi spillmanni
- Epiplatys olbrechtsi kassiapleuensis

==== Poeciliids ====
- Aplocheilichthys keilhacki
- Kibiti lampeye (Aplocheilichthys lacustris)
- Ruaha lampeye (Aplocheilichthys omoculatus)
- Rovuma topminnow (Aplocheilichthys sp. 'Rovuma')
- Usangu lampeye (Aplocheilichthys usanguensis)
- Yellowfin gambusia (Gambusia alvarezi)
- San Felipe gambusia (Gambusia clarkhubbsi)
- Big Bend gambusia (Gambusia gaigei)
- Clear Creek gambusia (Gambusia heterochir)
- Crescent gambusia (Gambusia hurtadoi)
- Spotfin gambusia (Gambusia krumholzi)
- Cuatrocienegas gambusia (Gambusia longispinis)
- Micropanchax bracheti
- Red striped lampeye (Plataplochilus miltotaenia)
- Yaqui topminnow (Poeciliopsis sonorensis)
- Procatopus nimbaensis
- Rhexipanchax kabae
- Lambert's lampeye (Rhexipanchax lamberti)

==== Fundulids ====
- Broadstripe topminnow (Fundulus euryzonus)
- Giant killifish (Fundulus grandissimus)
- Saltmarsh topminnow (Fundulus jenkinsi)
- Waccamaw killifish (Fundulus waccamensis)

=== Cypriniformes ===
Cypriniformes includes carps, minnows, loaches and relatives. There are 298 species and one subspecies in the order Cypriniformes assessed as vulnerable.

==== Hillstream loaches ====
- Aborichthys garoensis
- Aborichthys tikaderi
- Slender stone loach (Balitora mysorensis)
- Waterfall climbing cave fish (Cryptotora thamicola)
- Hemimyzon confluens
- Hemimyzon taitungensis
- Pambar banded loach (Mesonoemacheilus pambarensis)
- Nemacheilus banar
- Indoreonectes keralensis (Nemacheilus keralensis)
- Nemacheilus kodaguensis
- Periyar blotched loach (Nemacheilus menoni)
- Nemacheilus pavonaceus
- Periyar reticulated loach (Nemacheilus periyarensis)
- Starostin's loach (Nemacheilus starostini)
- Oreonectes anophthalmus
- Orthrias tschaiyssuensis
- Central Anatolian loach (Oxynoemacheilus eregliensis)
- Carian loach (Oxynoemacheilus germencicus)
- Oxynoemacheilus pindus
- Zagroz blind loach (Paracobitis smithi)
- Physoschistura elongata
- Schistura atra
- Schistura chindwinica
- Schistura deansmarti
- Schistura inglisi
- Schistura jarutanini
- Laotian cave loach (Schistura kaysonei)
- Schistura khugae
- Schistura kontumensis
- Schistura nagaensis
- Schistura oedipus
- Schistura prashadi
- Schistura reticulofasciata
- Sharavati loach (Schistura sharavathiensis)
- Schistura singhi
- Schistura spekuli
- Schistura spiesi
- Schistura susannae
- Schistura tubulinaris
- Southern pond loach (Seminemacheilus ispartensis)
- Northern pond loach (Seminemacheilus lendlii)
- Sewellia lineolata
- Sinogastromyzon puliensis
- Sundoreonectes sabanus
- Speonectes tiomanensis (Sundoreonectes tiomanensis)
- Triplophysa gejiuensis
- Triplophysa xiangxiensis
- Yunnanilus brevis
- Yunnanilus niger
- Yunnanilus pleurotaenia

==== True loaches ====
- Long-faced loach (Acantopsis octoactinotos)
- Botia rostrata
- Cobitis dalmatina
- Cobitis maroccana
- Cobitis meridionalis
- Cobitis narentana
- Cobitis paludica
- Cobitis punctilineata
- Cobitis zanandreai
- Elongate loach (Leptobotia elongata)
- Protocobitis typhlops
- Romanian loach (Sabanejewia romanica)
- Serpenticobitis cingulata
- Black-lined loach (Yasuhikotakia nigrolineata)
- Yasuhikotakia splendida

==== Cyprinids ====
Species

- Yarkon bream (Acanthobrama telavivensis)
- Itasenpara bitterling (Acheilognathus longipinnis)
- Achondrostoma arcasii
- Crimean spirlin (Alburnoides maculatus)
- Ohrid spirlin (Alburnoides ohridanus)
- Prespa spirlin (Alburnoides prespensis)
- Italian bleak (Alburnus albidus)
- Gediz shemaya (Alburnus battalgilae)
- Alburnus belvica
- Eastern Aegean bleak (Alburnus demiri)
- Orontes spotted bleak (Alburnus orontis)
- Pike asp (Aspiolucius esocinus)
- Bangana almorae
- Bangana behri
- Bangana musaei
- Bangana tonkinensis
- Barbodes hemictenus
- Barbodes lindog
- Barbodes manguaoensis
- Barbodes sirang
- Barbodes tumba
- Barboides gracilis
- Barbus alluaudi
- Amatola barb (Barbus amatolicus)
- Barbus anniae
- Barbus bagbwensis
- Barbus cadenati
- Clanwilliam redfin (Barbus calidus)
- Barbus choloensis
- Barbus collarti
- Barbus dialonensis
- Barbus ditinensis
- Barbus eburneensis
- Barbus foutensis
- Barbus gruveli
- Shabout (Barbus grypus)
- Barbo de cola roja (Barbus haasi)
- Barbus harterti
- Barbus huloti
- Barbus issenensis
- Barbus kissiensis
- Barbus ksibi
- Barbus laticeps
- Marico barb (Barbus motebensis)
- Barbus niokoloensis
- Barbus paytonii
- Barbus pseudotoppini
- Barbus raimbaulti
- Barbus reinii
- Barbus salessei
- Barbus serengetiensis
- Chimanimani chubbyhead (Barbus sp. 'Chimanimani')
- Barbus sp. 'Pangani'
- Barbus taeniurus
- Barbus tauricus
- Barbus walkeri
- Barbus zalbiensis
- Barilius chatricensis
- Barilius dimorphicus
- Manipur baril (Barilius dogarsinghi)
- Barilius ngawa
- Congo blind barb (Caecobarbus geertsii)
- Pamphylian scraper (Capoeta antalyensis)
- Kiss-lip himri (Carasobarbus kosswigi)
- Lake Rukwa sardine (Chelaethiops rukwaensis)
- Eastern Aegean nase (Chondrostoma holmwoodii)
- Neretvan nase (Chondrostoma knerii)
- Işıklı nase (Chondrostoma meandrense)
- Chondrostoma prespense
- Tennessee dace (Chrosomus tennesseensis)
- Mrigal carp (Cirrhinus cirrhosus)
- Smallscale mud carp (Cirrhinus microlepis)
- Beautiful shiner (Cyprinella formosa)
- Spotfin chub (Cyprinella monacha)
- Proserpine shiner (Cyprinella proserpina)
- Assamese kingfish (Cyprinion semiplotum)
- Common carp (Cyprinus carpio)
- Danio jaintianensis
- Mascara barb (Dawkinsia assimilis)
- Rohan's barb (Dawkinsia rohani)
- Delminichthys adspersus
- Delminichthys ghetaldii
- Devario acuticephala
- Devario anomalus
- Devario apopyris
- Devario assamensis
- Devario browni
- Fraser danio (Devario fraseri)
- Devario naganensis
- Devario yuensis
- Red fin shark (Epalzeorhynchos munense)
- Desert dace (Eremichthys acros)
- Garra allostoma
- Garra bispinosa
- Asir garra (Garra buettikeri)
- Garra compressa
- Garra duobarbis
- Garra flavatra
- Garra litanensis
- Garra manipurensis
- Silent Valley stone sucker (Garra menoni)
- Garra nambulica
- Garra paralissorhynchus
- Periyar stone sucker (Garra periyarensis)
- Garra regressus
- Wadi Hasik garra (Garra smarti)
- Garra tana
- Gibbibarbus cyphotergous
- Sonora chub (Gila ditaenia)
- Chihuahua chub (Gila nigrescens)
- Arroyo chub (Gila orcuttii)
- Yaqui chub (Gila purpurea)
- Gobio feraeensis
- Gobio kovatschevi
- Salgir gudgeon (Gobio krymensis)
- Beysehir gudgeon (Gobio microlepidotus)
- Gobio ohridanus
- Gymnocypris dobula
- Gymnocypris scleracanthus
- Horalabiosa palaniensis
- Kolus barb (Hypselobarbus kolus)
- Hypsibarbus lagleri
- Iberochondrostoma lemmingii
- Iberocypris alburnoides
- Zagros cave garra (Iranocypris typhlops)
- Ewaso Nyiro labeo (Labeo percivali)
- Labeo pierrei
- Labeo rectipinnis
- Labeo sp. 'Baomo'
- Labeo sp. 'Mzima'
- Labeo trigliceps
- Labeobarbus acutirostris
- Clanwilliam yellowfish (Labeobarbus capensis)
- Labeobarbus gorguari
- Labeobarbus ossensis
- Labeobarbus platydorsus
- Ghizáni (Ladigesocypris ghigii)
- Malabar hatchet chela (Laubuca fasciata)
- Laubuca khujairokensis
- Southern leatherside chub (Lepidomeda aliciae)
- Virgin spinedace (Lepidomeda mollispinis)
- Leptocypris crossensis
- Leptocypris konkourensis
- Leptocypris taiaensis
- Luciobarbus brachycephalus
- Luciobarbus capito
- Iberian barbel (Luciobarbus comizo)
- Mangar (Luciobarbus esocinus)
- Barbo mediterraneo (Luciobarbus guiraonis)
- Menderes barbel (Luciobarbus kottelati)
- Luciobarbus microcephalus
- Luciobarbus steindachneri
- Gattan (Luciobarbus xanthopterus)
- Shuttle-like carp (Luciocyprinus langsoni)
- Prairie chub (Macrhybopsis australis)
- Binni (Mesopotamichthys sharpeyi)
- Mystacoleucus lepturus
- Dark mahseer (Naziritor chelynoides)
- Cave brook carp (Neolissochilus subterraneus)
- Neolissochilus theinemanni
- Soto la Marina shiner (Notropis aguirrepequenoi)
- Smalleye shiner (Notropis buccula)
- Arkansas river shiner (Notropis girardi)
- Notropis imeldae
- Blackmouth shiner (Notropis melanostomus)
- Sharpnose shiner (Notropis oxyrhynchus)
- Peppered shiner (Notropis perpallidus)
- Roughhead shiner (Notropis semperasper)
- Opsaridium microcephalum
- Umpqua chub (Oregonichthys kalawatseti)
- Oxygaster pointoni
- South-west European nase (Parachondrostoma toxostoma)
- Ratnagiri minnow (Parapsilorhynchus discophorus)
- Parasinilabeo assimilis
- Pethia ater
- Pethia khugae
- Pethia ornata
- Indigo barb (Pethia setnai)
- Shalyni barb (Pethia shalynius)
- Pethia yuensis
- Phoxinellus pseudalepidotus
- Phreatichthys andruzzii
- Poropuntius speleops
- Poropuntius tawarensis
- Pseudochondrostoma duriense
- Pseudochondrostoma willkommii
- Pseudohemiculter dispar
- Pseudolaubuca hotaya
- Antalya spring minnow (Pseudophoxinus antalyae)
- Ceyhan spring minnow (Pseudophoxinus zekayi)
- Pterocapoeta maroccana
- Bluenose shiner (Pteronotropis welaka)
- Colorado pikeminnow (Ptychocheilus lucius)
- Arenatus barb (Puntius arenatus)
- Puntius mudumalaiensis
- Rasbora baliensis
- Rasbora ennealepis
- Rasbora ornata
- Rasbora tawarensis
- Loach minnow (Rhinichthys cobitis)
- Kyushu bitterling (Rhodeus atremius)
- Rhodeus laoensis
- Rutilus panosi
- Rutilus prespensis
- Salmophasia belachi
- Hora razorbelly minnow (Salmophasia horai)
- Scaphognathops bandanensis
- Schizothorax richardsonii
- Sinocyclocheilus anatirostris
- Sinocyclocheilus angularis
- Sinocyclocheilus anophthalmus
- Sinocyclocheilus hyalinus
- Sinocyclocheilus microphthalmus
- Borax Lake chub (Siphateles boraxobius)
- Squalius aradensis
- Thick lipped chub (Squalius cephaloides)
- Squalius janae
- Aksehir chub (Squalius recurvirostris)
- Squalius svallize
- Squalius valentinus
- Bicolor minnow (Tampichthys dichromus)
- Tokyo bitterling (Tanakia tanago)
- Telestes metohiensis
- Tor ater
- Troglocyclocheilus khammouanensis
- Tropidophoxinellus spartiaticus
- Typhlobarbus nudiventris
- Varicorhinus ansorgii
- Varicorhinus leleupanus
- Varicorhinus ruwenzori

Subspecies

- Incilevrek baligi (Phoxinellus zeregi fahirae)

==== Suckers ====
- Matalote cahita (Catostomus cahita)
- Matalote conchos (Catostomus conchos)
- Bavispe sucker (Catostomus leopoldi)
- Opata sucker (Catostomus wigginsi)

=== Esociformes ===
Includes pike and relatives.

Species

- Cisalpine pike (Esox cisalpinus)
- European mudminnow (Umbra krameri)

=== Gasterosteiformes ===
Includes sticklebacks and relatives.

Species

- Indostomus crocodilus
- Amur stickleback (Pungitius sinensis)

Subpopulations

- Little dragonfish (Eurypegasus draconis) (1 subpopulation)
- Longtail seamoth (Pegasus volitans) (2 subpopulations)

=== Osmeriformes ===
Includes freshwater smelts and allies.

- Aplochiton marinus
- Giant kokopu (Galaxias argenteus)
- Flathead galaxias (Galaxias depressiceps)
- Dwarf inanga (Galaxias gracilis)
- Galaxiella pusilla
- Ariakehimeshirauo (Neosalanx regani)
- Arthurs paragalaxias (Paragalaxias mesotes)

=== Catfishes ===
There are 89 catfish species assessed as vulnerable.

==== Ictalurids ====
- Bagre de Rio Verde (Ictalurus mexicanus)
- Smoky madtom (Noturus baileyi)
- Yellowfin madtom (Noturus flavipinnis)
- Frecklebelly madtom (Noturus munitus)
- Phantom blindcat (Prietella lundbergi)
- Widemouth blindcat (Satan eurystomus)
- Toothless blindcat (Trogloglanis pattersoni)

==== Sisorids ====
- Deccan nangra (Gagata itchkeea)
- Glyptothorax manipurensis
- Glyptothorax saisii
- Glyptothorax trewavasae
- Myersglanis jayarami
- Pseudecheneis sirenica
- Pseudecheneis ukhrulensis
- Sisor barakensis

==== Loach catfishes ====
- Amphilius dimonikensis
- Amphilius kakrimensis
- Amphilius mamonekenensis
- Dolichamphilius brieni
- Doumea gracila
- Doumea thysi
- Paramphilius teugelsi
- Zaireichthys wamiensis

==== Claroteids ====
- Chrysichthys aluuensis
- Chrysichthys dageti
- Chrysichthys dendrophorus
- Chrysichthys helicophagus
- Chrysichthys longidorsalis
- Chrysichthys nyongensis
- Chrysichthys polli
- Notoglanidium pallidum
- Notoglanidium walkeri
- Parauchenoglanis pantherinus

==== Airbreathing catfishes ====
- Clariallabes teugelsi
- Clarias submarginatus
- Encheloclarias prolatus
- Encheloclarias tapeinopterus
- Gymnallabes nops
- Uegitglanis zammaranoi

==== Loricariids ====
- Ancistrus bolivianus
- Chaetostoma branickii
- Chaetostoma marmorescens
- Hypostomus annectens
- Hypostomus wilsoni
- Pseudotocinclus tietensis

==== Mochokids ====
- Chiloglanis benuensis
- Chiloglanis disneyi
- Chiloglanis elisabethianus
- Chiloglanis harbinger
- Kalombo suckermouth (Chiloglanis kalambo)
- Chiloglanis macropterus
- Mbozi suckermouth (Chiloglanis mbozi)
- Lake Rukwa suckermouth (Chiloglanis rukwaensis)
- Synodontis arnoulti
- Synodontis brichardi
- Synodontis cuangoanus
- Synodontis lufirae
- Synodontis macrophthalmus
- Synodontis macrops
- Synodontis robbianus
- Synodontis ruandae

==== Bagrids ====
- Bagrus caeruleus
- Travancore batasio (Batasio travancoria)
- Günther's catfish (Horabagrus brachysoma)
- Mystus bocourti
- Nekogigi (Pseudobagrus ichikawai)
- Pseudomystus myersi

==== Other catfish species ====
- Acrochordonichthys chamaeleon
- Astroblepus heterodon
- Astroblepus latidens
- Astroblepus supramollis
- Astroblepus ventralis
- Clanwilliam rock-catfish (Austroglanis gilli)
- Callichthys fabricioi
- Cranoglanis bouderius
- Diplomystes camposensis
- Listrura camposi
- False bronze sea-catfish (Notarius cookei)
- Caribbean sculptured sea catfish (Notarius neogranatensis)
- Kutubu tandan (Oloplotosus torobo)
- Ompok fumidus
- Pangasius krempfi
- Pimelodella macrocephala
- Juil ciego (Rhamdia reddelli)
- Rhamdia zongolicensis
- Gillbacker sea catfish (Sciades parkeri)
- Trichomycterus chungarensis
- Trichomycterus regani
- Trichomycterus transandianus

=== Batrachoidiformes ===
- Boulenger's toadfish (Batrachoides boulengeri)
- Toadfish (Daector reticulata)
- Schmitt's toadfish (Daector schmitti)
- Whitespotted toadfish (Sanopus astrifer)
- Whitelined toadfish (Sanopus greenfieldorum)
- Thalassophryne uranoscopus
- Glover's reef toadfish (Vladichthys gloverensis)

=== Perciformes ===
There are 405 species, one subspecies, and one subpopulation in the order Perciformes assessed as vulnerable.

==== Gouramis ====
- Betta burdigala
- Betta chini
- Betta chloropharynx
- Betta hipposideros
- Spotfin betta (Betta macrostoma)
- Betta pinguis
- Siamese fighting fish (Betta splendens)
- Betta tomi
- Elephant ear gourami (Osphronemus exodon)
- Pseudosphromenus dayi
- Sphaerichthys vaillanti

==== Cichlids ====
Species

- Alcolapia grahami
- Andinoacara biseriatus
- Apistogramma cinilabra
- Aulonocara aquilonium
- Aulonocara auditor
- Chitande aulonocara (Aulonocara ethelwynnae)
- Fort Maguire aulonocara (Aulonocara hansbaenschi)
- Night aulonocara (Aulonocara hueseri)
- Aulonocara kandeense
- Aulonocara chizumulu (Aulonocara korneliae)
- Sulfurhead aulonocara (Aulonocara maylandi)
- Emperor cichlid (Aulonocara nyassae)
- Pale Usisya aulonocara (Aulonocara steveni)
- Benitochromis batesii
- Chromidotilapia cavalliensis
- Chromidotilapia regani
- Copadichromis atripinnis
- Copadichromis boadzulu
- Copadichromis conophorus
- Copadichromis cyclicos
- Copadichromis geertsi
- Copadichromis mbenji
- Copadichromis nkatae
- Copadichromis thinos
- Copadichromis trewavasae
- Copadichromis verduyni
- Coptodon camerunensis
- Ctenochromis aff. pectoralis
- Cynotilapia axelrodi
- Cynotilapia zebroides
- Haplochromis aeneocolor
- Haplochromis argens
- Haplochromis azureus
- Haplochromis bicolor
- Haplochromis bwathondii
- Haplochromis chromogynos
- Haplochromis demeusii
- Haplochromis fasciatus
- Haplochromis fischeri
- Jordan mouthbrooder (Haplochromis flaviijosephi)
- Haplochromis fusiformis
- Haplochromis gigas
- Smok (Haplochromis howesi)
- Katavi mouthbrooder (Haplochromis katavi)
- Haplochromis luteus
- Haplochromis macrocephalus
- Haplochromis maxillaris
- Haplochromis megalops
- Haplochromis melanopterus
- Haplochromis moeruensis
- Haplochromis nubilus
- Haplochromis obliquidens
- Haplochromis orthostoma
- Haplochromis petronius
- Haplochromis piceatus
- Haplochromis plagiodon
- Haplochromis polli
- Haplochromis retrodens
- Rock kribensis (Haplochromis sauvagei)
- Haplochromis schwetzi
- Haplochromis sp. 'Blue Rockpicker'
- Double stripe (Haplochromis thereuterion)
- Haplochromis tweddlei
- Haplochromis vanoijeni
- Haplochromis velifer
- Haplochromis welcommei
- Black pseudo-nigricans (Haplochromis xanthopteryx)
- Harpagochromis sp. 'frogmouth'
- Barton's cichlid (Herichthys bartoni)
- Minkley's cichlid (Herichthys minckleyi)
- Chairel cichlid (Herichthys pantostictus)
- Iodotropheus declivitas
- Lavender mbuna (Iodotropheus sprengerae)
- Iodotropheus stuartgranti
- Katria katria
- Labidochromis chisumulae
- Chisumulu pearl (Labidochromis flavigulis)
- Labidochromis freibergi
- Labidochromis gigas
- Labidochromis heterodon
- Labidochromis ianthinus
- Labidochromis lividus
- Labidochromis mbenjii
- Labidochromis mylodon
- Labidochromis pallidus
- Labidochromis strigatus
- Labidochromis zebroides
- Lamprologus teugelsi
- Lamprologus tigripictilis
- Lamprologus werneri
- Lethrinops macrophthalmus
- Lethrinops oculatus
- Maylandia aurora
- Maylandia benetos
- Maylandia callainos
- Maylandia chrysomallos
- Maylandia cyneusmarginata
- Maylandia emmiltos
- Maylandia estherae
- Maylandia hajomaylandi
- Maylandia heteropicta
- Maylandia mbenjii
- Maylandia melabranchion
- Maylandia phaeos
- Maylandia pursa
- Maylandia pyrsonotos
- Maylandia sandaracinos
- Maylandia thapsinogen
- Maylandia xanstomachus
- Melanochromis baliodigma
- Melanochromis chipokae
- Melanochromis cyaneorhabdos
- Melanochromis dialeptos
- Melanochromis heterochromis
- Pearl of Likoma (Melanochromis joanjohnsonae)
- Bluegray mbuna (Melanochromis johannii)
- Melanochromis lepidiadaptes
- Melanochromis loriae
- Melanochromis perileucos
- Nanochromis consortus
- Nanochromis minor
- Nanochromis splendens
- Neolamprologus christyi
- Neolamprologus devosi
- Neolamprologus schreyeni
- Threespot tilapia (Oreochromis andersonii)
- Oreochromis latilabris
- Greenhead tilapia (Oreochromis macrochir)
- Mozambique tilapia (Oreochromis mossambicus)
- Oreochromis ndalalani
- Lake Rukwa tilapia (Oreochromis rukwaensis)
- Oreochromis salinicola
- Orthochromis luichensis
- Orthochromis malagaraziensis
- Orthochromis rugufuensis
- Otopharynx lithobates
- Otopharynx pachycheilus
- Parananochromis brevirostris
- Marakely (Paratilapia polleni)
- Kotsovato (Paretroplus kieneri)
- Paretroplus loisellei
- Paretroplus nourissati
- Paretroplus polyactis
- Paretroplus sp. 'Dridri mena'
- Petrotilapia chrysos
- Petrotilapia nigra
- Protomelas dejunctus
- Protomelas virgatus
- Pseudotropheus ater
- Cyan hap (Pseudotropheus cyaneus)
- Pseudotropheus demasoni
- Elongate mbuna (Pseudotropheus elongatus)
- Pseudotropheus flavus
- Pseudotropheus galanos
- Pseudotropheus interruptus
- Pseudotropheus longior
- Pseudotropheus modestus
- Pseudotropheus purpuratus
- Pseudotropheus saulosi
- Pseudotropheus tursiops
- Ptychochromis sp. 'Garaka'
- Simochromis margaretae
- Simochromis marginatus
- Steatocranus glaber
- Tahuantinsuyoa chipi
- Teleogramma gracile
- Teleogramma monogramma
- Tilapia busumana
- Tilapia discolor
- Coelotilapia joka (Tilapia joka)
- Short jaw tristramella (Tristramella simonis)
- Tropheops gracilior
- Tropheops microstoma
- Tropheops romandi
- Tropheops tropheops
- Tropheus duboisi
- Tailbar cichlid (Vieja hartwegi)
- Xenotilapia burtoni

Subspecies

- Sarotherodon galilaeus borkuanus

==== Percids ====
- Western sand darter (Ammocrypta clara)
- Crystal darter (Crystallaria asprella)
- Sharphead darter (Etheostoma acuticeps)
- Conchos darter (Etheostoma australe)
- Warrior darter (Etheostoma bellator)
- Holiday darter (Etheostoma brevirostrum)
- Ashy darter (Etheostoma cinereum)
- Golden darter (Etheostoma denoncourti)
- Etowah darter (Etheostoma etowahae)
- Barrens darter (Etheostoma forbesi)
- Rio Grande darter (Etheostoma grahami)
- Tuxedo darter (Etheostoma lemniscatum)
- Spotted darter (Etheostoma maculatum)
- Niangua darter (Etheostoma nianguae)
- Paleback darter (Etheostoma pallididorsum)
- Waccamaw darter (Etheostoma perlongum)
- Mexican darter (Etheostoma pottsii)
- Egg-mimic darter (Etheostoma pseudovulatum)
- Citico darter (Etheostoma sitikuense)
- Striated darter (Etheostoma striatulum)
- Trispot darter (Etheostoma trisella)
- Tuscumbia darter (Etheostoma tuscumbia)
- Boulder darter (Etheostoma wapiti)
- Halloween darter (Percina crypta)
- Goldline darter (Percina aurolineata)
- Chesapeake logperch (Percina bimaculata)
- Blotchside logperch (Percina burtoni)
- Bluestripe darter (Percina cymatotaenia)
- Roanoke logperch (Percina rex)
- Bankhead darter (Percina sipsi)
- Snail darter (Percina tanasi)
- Sickle darter (Percina williamsi)

==== Epinephelids ====
Species

- Humpback grouper (Cromileptes altivelis)
- Captain fine (Epinephelus albomarginatus)
- Kelp grouper (Epinephelus bruneus)
- Gabriella's grouper (Epinephelus gabriellae)
- Giant grouper (Epinephelus lanceolatus)
- Poey's grouper (Hyporthodus flavolimbatus)
- Hyporthodus niveatus
- Yellowmouth grouper (Mycteroperca interstitialis)
- Sailfin grouper (Mycteroperca olfax)
- Mycteroperca rosacea
- Polkadot cod (Plectropomus areolatus)
- Blacksaddled coral grouper (Plectropomus laevis)

Subpopulations

==== Gobies ====
- Awaous bustamantei
- Southern frillfin (Bathygobius lineatus)
- Dalhousie goby (Chlamydogobius gloveri)
- White-starred goby (Chriolepis dialepta)
- Pretty goby (Chriolepis lepidota)
- Corcyrogobius lubbocki
- Barfin goby (Coryphopterus alloides)
- Pallid goby (Coryphopterus eidolon)
- Glass goby (Coryphopterus hyalinus)
- Peppermint goby (Coryphopterus lipernes)
- Masked goby (Coryphopterus personatus)
- Bartail goby (Coryphopterus thrix)
- Patch-reef goby (Coryphopterus tortugae)
- Sand-canyon goby (Coryphopterus venezuelae)
- Mexican goby (Ctenogobius claytonii)
- Didogobius amicuscaridis
- Broken-back cleaner-goby (Elacatinus nesiotes)
- Broadstripe goby (Elacatinus prochilos)
- Cable's goby (Eleotrica cableae)
- Shortjaw mudsucker (Gillichthys seta)
- Glossogobius ankaranensis
- Glossogobius flavipinnis
- Glossogobius intermedius
- Glossogobius matanensis
- Hildebrand's goby (Gobiosoma hildebrandi)
- Gobius tetrophthalmus
- Gorogobius stevcici
- Neretva dwarf goby (Knipowitschia croatica)
- Gediz dwarf goby (Knipowitschia mermere)
- Norin goby (Knipowitschia radovici)
- Lentipes whittenorum
- Galapagos blue-banded goby (Lythrypnus gilberti)
- Distant goby (Lythrypnus insularis)
- Mugilogobius adeia
- Mugilogobius latifrons
- Arno goby (Padogobius nigricans)
- Turan's goby (Ponticola turani)
- Boehlke's goby (Psilotris boehlkei)
- Rhinogobius albimaculatus
- Rhinogobius chiengmaiensis
- Sicyopus axilimentus
- Stenogobius keletaona
- Stiphodon imperiorientis
- Stiphodon surrufus
- Stupidogobius flavipinnis
- Sarasin's goby (Tamanka sarasinorum)
- Cinta goby (Tigrigobius redimiculus)

==== Sparids ====
- Okinawa seabream (Acanthopagrus sivicolus)
- Acanthopagrus vagus
- Hoshierenko (Cheimerius matsubarai)
- Black musselcracker (Cymatoceps nasutus)
- Common dentex (Dentex dentex)
- Scotsman seabream (Polysteganus praeorbitalis)
- White stumpnose (Rhabdosargus globiceps)

==== Sand stargazers ====
- Dactyloscopus insulatus
- Milky sand stargazer (Dactyloscopus lacteus)
- Cocos stargazer (Gillellus chathamensis)
- Myxodagnus sagitta
- Shortfin sand stargazer (Platygillellus rubellulus)

==== Sciaenids ====
- African weakfish (Atractoscion aequidens)
- Gulf corvina (Cynoscion othonopterus)
- Galapagos croaker (Odontoscion eurymesops)
- Law croaker (Pseudotolithus senegallus)
- Galápagos drum (Umbrina galapagorum)

==== Labrisomids ====
- Galápagos four-eyed blenny (Dialommus fuscus)
- Bravo clinid (Gobioclinus dendriticus)
- Jenkins' blenny (Labrisomus jenkinsi)
- Misspelled blenny (Labrisomus socorroensis)
- Belted blenny (Malacoctenus zonogaster)
- Paraclinus fehlmanni
- Galapagos blenny (Starksia galapagensis)

==== Serranids ====
- Anthias regalis
- Maya hamlet (Hypoplectrus maya)
- Plectranthias chungchowensis
- Socorran soapfish (Rypticus courtenayi)
- Socorro serrano (Serranus socorroensis)

==== Chaenopsids ====
- Cocos barnacle blenny (Acanthemblemaria atrata)
- Galápagos barnacle blenny (Acanthemblemaria castroi)
- Revillagigedo barnacle blenny (Acanthemblemaria mangognatha)
- Malpelo barnacle blenny (Acanthemblemaria stephensi)
- Yellow-mouth pikeblenny (Chaenopsis schmitti)
- Seafan blenny (Emblemariopsis pricei)

==== Combtooth blennies ====
- Ecsenius kurti
- Ecsenius randalli
- Ecsenius tigris
- Derawan combtooth-blenny (Ecsenius tricolor)
- Entomacrodus chapmani
- Socorro blenny (Hypsoblennius proteus)
- Medusablennius chani
- Meiacanthus abruptus
- Meiacanthus naevius
- Mimoblennius lineathorax
- Oman blenny (Oman ypsilon)
- Omobranchus aurosplendidus
- Omobranchus hikkaduwensis
- Mekran blenny (Omobranchus mekranensis)
- Omobranchus smithi
- Ophioblennius clippertonensis
- Mud blenny (Parablennius lodosus)
- Parablennius serratolineatus
- Natal blenny (Praealticus natalis)
- Salarias atlantica
- Scartella nuchifilis
- Scartella poiti
- Scartella springeri

==== Wrasses ====
- Western blue groper (Achoerodus gouldii)
- Barred hogfish (Bodianus scrofa)
- Green humphead parrotfish (Bolbometopon muricatum)
- Mutant wrasse (Conniella apterygia)
- Doubleheader (Coris bulbifrons)
- Black wrasse (Halichoeres adustus)
- Cocos wrasse (Halichoeres discolor)
- Socorro wrasse (Halichoeres insularis)
- Malpelo wrasse (Halichoeres malpelo)
- Halichoeres salmofasciatus
- Green wrasse (Labrus viridis)
- Hogfish (Lachnolaimus maximus)
- California sheephead (Semicossyphus pulcher)
- Tautog (Tautoga onitis)
- Thalassoma robertsoni
- Thalassoma virens
- Galapagos razorfish (Xyrichtys victori)
- Xyrichtys virens
- Xyrichtys wellingtoni

==== Threefin blennies ====
- Cocos triplefin (Axoclinus cocoensis)
- Multibarred triplefin (Axoclinus multicinctus)
- Rubinoff's triplefin (Axoclinus rubinoffi)
- Enneanectes smithi
- Twinspot triplefin (Lepidonectes bimaculatus)
- Galapagos triplefin blenny (Lepidonectes corallicola)

==== Other Perciformes species ====
- Kapingamarangi surgeonfish (Acanthurus chronixis)
- Aioliops brachypterus
- Bidyanus bidyanus
- Boroda expatria
- Ornamented dragonet (Callionymus comptus)
- Channa diplogramme
- Torrentfish (Cheimarrichthys fosteri)
- Ctenopoma nebulosum
- Datnioides undecimradiatus
- Carolina pygmy sunfish (Elassoma boehlkei)
- Bluebarred pygmy sunfish (Elassoma okatie)
- Verdean nibbler (Girella zonata)
- Bluegill bully (Gobiomorphus hubbsi)
- Adamson's grunter (Hephaestus adamsoni)
- Striped grunter (Hephaestus obtusifrons)
- Threespot grunter (Hephaestus trimaculatus)
- Clarion angelfish (Holacanthus clarionensis)
- Sailfish (Istiphorus platypterus)
- Bigeye lates (Lates mariae)
- Northern red snapper (Lutjanus campechanus)
- Cubera snapper (Lutjanus cyanopterus)
- Atlantic blue marlin (Makaira nigricans)
- Mesopristes elongatus
- Blotched mogurnda (Mogurnda spilota)
- Striped mogurnda (Mogurnda vitta)
- Yarra pygmy perch (Nannoperca obscura)
- Golden pygmy perch (Nannoperca variegata)
- Golden threadfin bream (Nemipterus virgatus)
- Royal threadfin (Pentanemus quinquarius)
- Bluefish (Pomatomus saltatrix)
- Pale dottyback (Pseudochromis pesi)
- West African goatfish (Pseudupeneus prayensis)
- Vermilion snapper (Rhomboplites aurorubens)
- Monterrey Spanish mackerel (Scomberomorus concolor)
- Galapagos ringtail damselfish (Stegastes beebei)
- Whitetail damselfish (Stegastes leucorus)
- Clarion damselfish (Stegastes redemptus)
- Bigeye tuna (Thunnus obesus)
- Pacific bluefin tuna (Thunnus orientalis)
- Totoaba macdonaldi
- Atlantic horse mackerel (Trachurus trachurus)
- Yamur Lake grunter (Varia jamoerensis)
- White salema (Xenichthys agassizii)
- Black-striped salema (Xenocys jessiae)

=== Beloniformes ===
- Hyporhamphus xanthopterus
- Oryzias celebensis
- Oryzias marmoratus
- Oryzias matanensis
- Black buntingi (Oryzias nigrimas)
- Oryzias profundicola
- Tondanichthys kottelati
- Nomorhamphus towoetii

=== Synbranchiformes ===
- Chendol lubricus
- Mastacembelus aviceps
- Mastacembelus crassus
- Mastacembelus latens
- Mastacembelus taiaensis
- Bombay swamp eel (Monopterus indicus)

=== Osteoglossiformes ===
==== Mormyrids ====
- Campylomormyrus bredoi
- Ivindomyrus opdenboschi
- Marcusenius brucii
- Marcusenius cuangoanus
- Marcusenius ntemensis
- Marcusenius sanagaensis
- Marcusenius sp. 'Malindi'
- Marcusenius sp. 'Turkwell'
- Mormyrus cyaneus
- Mormyrus iriodes
- Myomyrus pharao
- Paramormyrops eburneensis
- Paramormyrops gabonensis
- Paramormyrops hopkinsi
- Paramormyrops longicaudatus
- Stomatorhinus microps

=== Gobiesociformes ===
- Apletodon barbatus
- Galapagos clingfish (Arcos poecilophthalmus)
- Clarion clingfish (Gobiesox aethus)
- Socorro clingfish (Gobiesox canidens)
- Woods' clingfish (Gobiesox woodsi)
- Distant clingfish (Tomicodon absitus)
- Bifid clingfish (Tomicodon bidens)
- Vermiculate clingfish (Tomicodon vermiculatus)

=== Characiformes ===
Species

- Alestopetersius smykalai
- Niger tetra (Arnoldichthys spilopterus)
- Astyanax cordovae
- Astyanax trierythropterus
- Attonitus bounites
- Brycinus brevis
- Brycinus carolinae
- Brycinus derhami
- Brycinus luteus
- Brycon fowleri
- Brycon moorei
- Brycon orthotaenia
- Bryconamericus tolimae
- Clupeocharax schoutedeni
- Cynopotamus atratoensis
- Distichodus petersii
- Genycharax tarpon
- Hyphessobrycon nigricinctus
- Ichthyoelephas longirostris
- Knodus longus
- Adonis tetra (Lepidarchus adonis)
- Leporinus muyscorum
- Micralestes comoensis
- Nannocharax latifasciatus
- Nannocharax rubrolabiatus
- Neolebias spilotaenia
- Pseudochalceus longianalis

Subspecies

- Astyanax mexicanus jordani

=== Syngnathiformes ===
Includes the pipefishes and seahorses.

- West African seahorse (Hippocampus algiricus)
- Barbour's seahorse (Hippocampus barbouri)
- Tiger tail seahorse (Hippocampus comes)
- Lined seahorse (Hippocampus erectus)
- Sea pony (Hippocampus fuscus)
- Spiny seahorse (Hippocampus histrix)
- Pacific seahorse (Hippocampus ingens)
- Great seahorse (Hippocampus kelloggi)
- Spotted seahorse (Hippocampus kuda)
- Hedgehog seahorse (Hippocampus spinosissimus)
- Flat-faced seahorse (Hippocampus trimaculatus)
- Andaman pipefish (Microphis insularis)
- Verco's pipefish (Vanacampus vercoi)

=== Clupeiformes ===
Species

- Blueback herring (Alosa aestivalis)
- Pontic shad (Alosa immaculata)
- Macedonian shad (Alosa macedonica)
- Alosa sp. 'Skadar'
- Chame point anchovy (Anchoa chamensis)
- Denticle herring (Denticeps clupeoides)
- Dungu sprat (Microthrissa minuta)
- Cuban longfin herring (Neoopisthopterus cubanus)
- Galapágos thread herring (Opisthonema berlangai)
- Vaqueira longfin herring (Opisthopterus effulgens)
- Lake Mweru sprat (Poecilothrissa moeruensis)
- Madeiran sardinella (Sardinella maderensis)
- Ronquillo's anchovy (Stolephorus ronquilloi)
- Laotian shad (Tenualosa thibaudeaui)

Subspecies

- Clupeonella abrau muhlisi

=== Scorpaeniformes ===
- Bear Lake sculpin (Cottus extensus)
- Timavo sculpin (Cottus scaturigo)
- Slender sculpin (Cottus tenuis)
- Galapagos gurnard (Prionotus miles)
- Long-ray searobin (Prionotus teaguei)

=== Ophidiiformes ===
- New Providence cusk-eel (Lucifuga spelaeotes)
- Lucifuga subterranea
- Lucifuga teresinarum
- Cocos brotula (Ogilbia cocoensis)
- Galapagos cuskeel (Ogilbia galapagosensis)
- Cuyo coralbrotula (Paradiancistrus cuyoensis)
- Stygicola dentata
- Mexican blind brotula (Typhliasina pearsei)

=== Tetraodontiformes ===
- Bellystriped blaasop (Arothron inconditus)
- Grey triggerfish (Balistes capriscus)
- Bluespotted triggerfish (Balistes punctatus)
- Canthigaster marquesensis
- Dwarf pufferfish (Carinotetraodon travancoricus)
- Liosaccus pachygaster
- Ocean sunfish (Mola mola)
- Orange spotted filefish (Oxymonacanthus longirostris)
- Redline pufferfish (Tetraodon pustulatus)

=== Other ray-finned fish species ===
- Shortjaw bonefish (Albula glossodonta)
- Indonesian longfinned eel (Anguilla borneensis)
- Apteronotus spurrellii
- Atlantic cod (Gadus morhua)
- Grasseichthys gabonensis
- Gymnotus henni
- Kneria ruaha
- Kneria uluguru
- Atlantic tarpon (Megalops atlanticus)
- Haddock (Melanogrammus aeglefinus)
- Candil amarillo (Myripristis clarionensis)
- Clipperton cardinal soldierfish (Myripristis gildi)
- Parakneria tanzaniae
- Pouch snake eel (Paraletharchus opercularis)
- Yellowtail flounder (Pleuronectes ferrugineus)
- Galapagos snake eel (Quassiremus evionthas)
- Zebrias lucapensis

== Hagfishes ==
- Longfin hagfish (Eptatretus longipinnis)
- Myxine garmani
- Myxine sotoi
- Paramyxine cheni
- Paramyxine fernholmi
- Paramyxine nelsoni

== See also ==
- Lists of IUCN Red List vulnerable species
- List of least concern fishes
- List of near threatened fishes
- List of endangered fishes
- List of critically endangered fishes
- List of recently extinct fishes
- List of data deficient fishes
- Sustainable seafood advisory lists and certification
