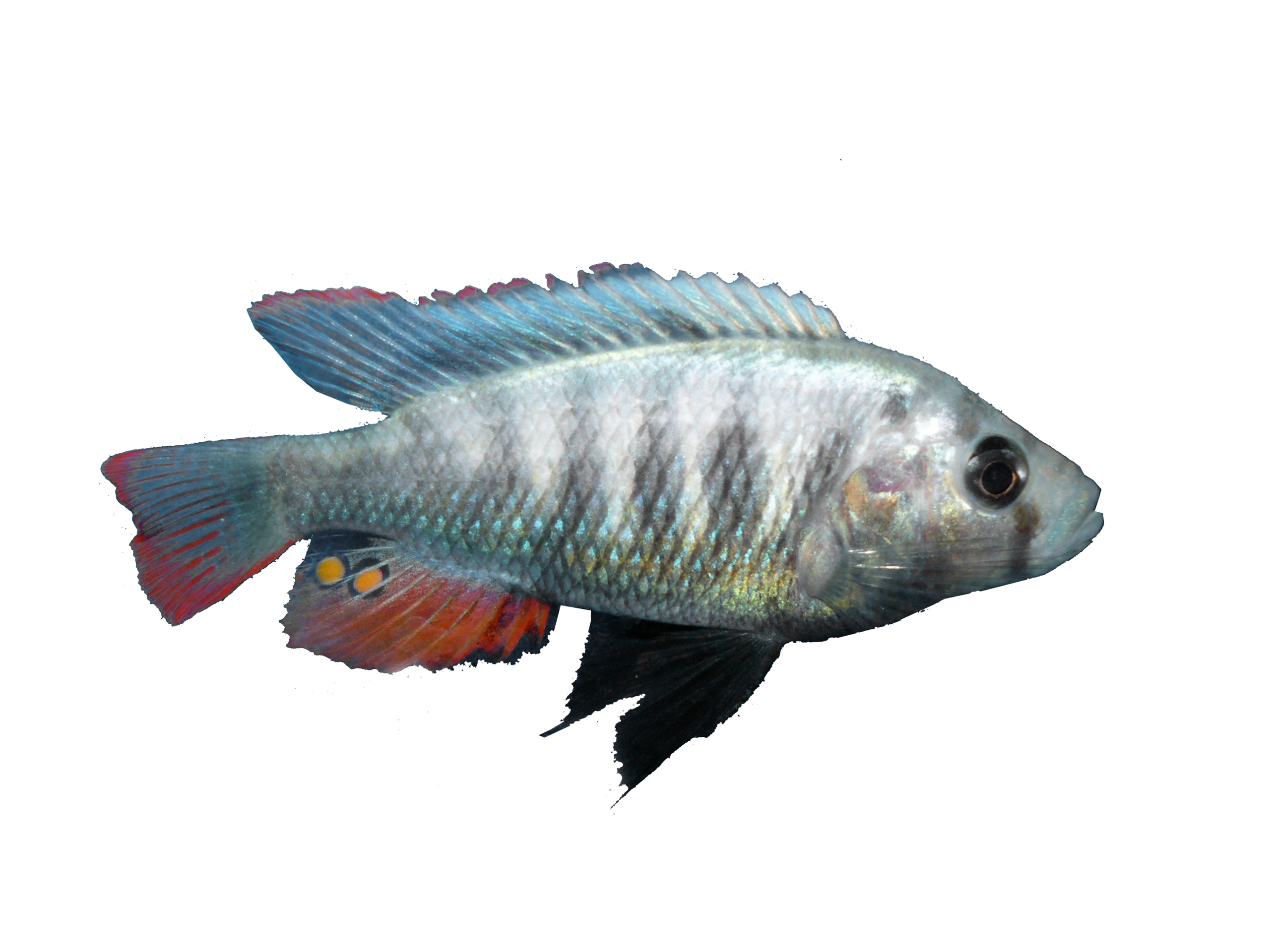
- Pundamilia pundamilia

Scientific classification
- Kingdom: Animalia
- Phylum: Chordata
- Class: Actinopterygii
- Order: Cichliformes
- Family: Cichlidae
- Tribe: Haplochromini
- Genus: Pundamilia; Seehausen & Lippitsch, 1998

Type species
- Pundamilia pundamilia Seehausen & Bouton, 1998

= Pundamilia =

Genus of fishes

Pundamilia is a small genus of haplochromine cichlids endemic to East Africa, primarily in Lake Victoria. FishBase includes them in Haplochromis. The generic epithet comes from Swahili punda milia ("zebra") after their striped appearance.

At present, five species are placed here:

- Pundamilia azurea Seehausen and Lippisch, 1998
- Pundamilia igneopinis Seehausen & Lippitsch 1998
- Pundamilia macrocephala Seehausen & Bouton 1998
- Pundamilia nyererei (Witte-Maas & F. Witte, 1985)
- Pundamilia pundamilia Seehausen & Bouton 1998
