= Silver barb =

Silver barb is a common name for several fishes and may refer to:

- Barbonymus gonionotus, known as silver barb in aquaculture, also called the Java barb
- Enteromius choloensis, found only in Malawi
- Puntius vittatus, also called the greenstripe barb or striped barb
