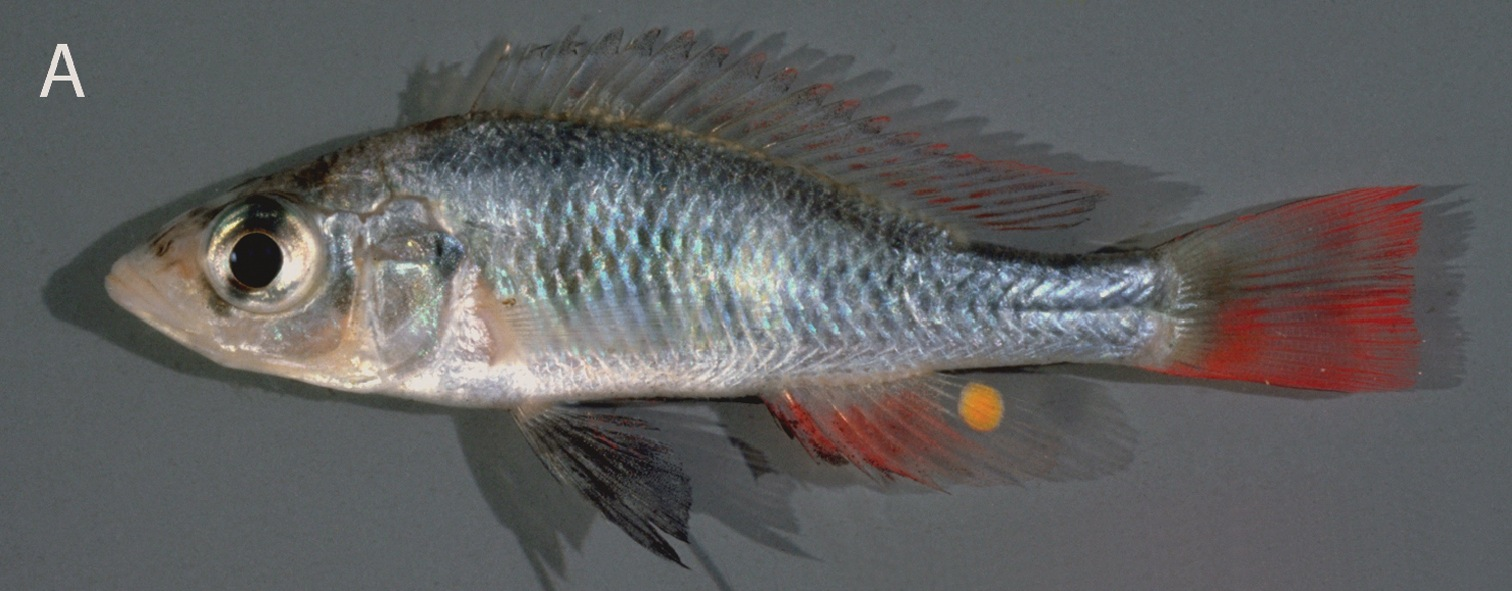

Conservation status
- Vulnerable (IUCN 3.1)

Scientific classification
- Kingdom: Animalia
- Phylum: Chordata
- Class: Actinopterygii
- Order: Cichliformes
- Family: Cichlidae
- Genus: Haplochromis
- Species: H. argens

Binomial name
- Haplochromis argens de Zeeuw, Westbroek & F. Witte, 2013

= Haplochromis argens =

Species of fish

Haplochromis argens is a species of haplochromine cichlid endemic to Lake Victoria where it is only known from the Tanzanian portion. This species reaches a length of 7.6 centimetres (3.0 in) SL. It feeds on zooplankton, primarily copepods and cladocerans, reflecting its dietary specialization as a zooplanktivore. By preying on planktonic crustaceans, it plays a key role in maintaining zooplankton population balance within the lake's ecosystem, which helps sustain its complex food web.
