= Gorogobius =

Scientific classification
- Kingdom: Animalia
- Phylum: Chordata
- Class: Actinopterygii
- Order: Gobiiformes
- Family: Gobiidae
- Genus: Gorogobius; P. J. Miller, 1978

Type species
- Gobius nigricinctus Delais, 1951

Genus of fishes

Gorogobius is a genus of gobies native to the Atlantic coast of Africa.

== Species ==
Two recognized species are in this genus:

- Gorogobius nigricinctus (Delais, 1951)
- Gorogobius stevcici Kovačić & Schliewen, 2008
