= Barboides britzi =

Scientific classification
- Kingdom: Animalia
- Phylum: Chordata
- Class: Actinopterygii
- Order: Cypriniformes
- Family: Cyprinidae
- Subfamily: Smiliogastrinae
- Genus: Barboides
- Species: B. britzi

Binomial name
- Barboides britzi Conway & Moritz, 2006

Species of fish

Barboides britzi is a species of ray-finned fish in the carp and minnow family, Cyprinidae which occurs only in the permanently flooded Lokoli swamp forest in the basin of the Ouémé River in southern Benin.

== Footnotes ==
- Froese, Rainer; Pauly, Daniel (eds.). "Barboides britzi". FishBase.
