= Labeobarbus alluaudi =

Conservation status
- Data Deficient (IUCN 3.1)

Scientific classification
- Kingdom: Animalia
- Phylum: Chordata
- Class: Actinopterygii
- Order: Cypriniformes
- Family: Cyprinidae
- Subfamily: Torinae
- Genus: Labeobarbus
- Species: L. alluaudi

Binomial name
- Labeobarbus alluaudi (Pellegrin, 1909)

Synonyms
- Barbus alluaudi Pellegrin, 1909

Species of fish

Labeobarbus alluaudi is a species of ray-finned fish in the family Cyprinidae. It has been found only in three rivers in Uganda. Some taxonomic authorities consider this species to be a hybrid of Labeobarbus somereni and Labeobarbus ruwenzorii.
