= Gorogobius nigricinctus =

Conservation status
- Least Concern (IUCN 3.1)

Scientific classification
- Domain: Eukaryota
- Kingdom: Animalia
- Phylum: Chordata
- Class: Actinopterygii
- Order: Gobiiformes
- Family: Gobiidae
- Genus: Gorogobius
- Species: G. nigricinctus

Binomial name
- Gorogobius nigricinctus (Delais, 1951)

Species of fish

Gorogobius nigricinctus is a species of marine fish from the family Gobiidae, the true gobies. It occurs in the Atlantic Ocean along the African coast from Senegal to Ghana and in the Gulf of Guinea, from 0 to 35 m (0 to 115 ft) depth. They are harmless to humans.

== Description ==
The fish grows to maximum 4 cm length.
