= Physoschistura =

Scientific classification
- Kingdom: Animalia
- Phylum: Chordata
- Class: Actinopterygii
- Division: Teleostei
- Order: Cypriniformes
- Family: Nemacheilidae
- Genus: Physoschistura; Bănărescu & Nalbant, 1982

Type species
- Nemachilus brunneanus Annandale, 1918

Genus of fishes

Physoschistura is a genus of fish in the family Nemacheilidae found mostly in Southeast Asia.

== Species ==
These are the currently recognized species in this genus:

- Physoschistura brunneana (Annandale, 1918)
- Physoschistura chulabhornae Suvarnaraksha, 2013
- Physoschistura elongata N. Sen & Nalbant, 1982
- Physoschistura longibulla Lin, Liu & Chen, 2024
- Physoschistura mango Conway & Kottelat, 2023 (Rosy loach)
- Physoschistura pseudobrunneana Kottelat, 1990
- Physoschistura ranikhetensis Singh & Das, 2019
- Physoschistura raoi (Hora, 1929)
- Physoschistura rivulicola (Hora, 1929)
