= Barboides =

Scientific classification
- Kingdom: Animalia
- Phylum: Chordata
- Class: Actinopterygii
- Order: Cypriniformes
- Family: Cyprinidae
- Subfamily: Smiliogastrinae
- Genus: Barboides; Brüning, 1929

Type species
- Barboides gracilis Brüning, 1929

Species
- See text

Synonyms
- Raddabarbus Thys van den Audenaerde, 1971

Genus of fishes

Barboides is a genus of very small ray-finned fish in the family Cyprinidae from freshwater habitats in West and Middle Africa.

== Species ==
- Barboides britzi Conway & Moritz, 2006
- Barboides gracilis Brüning, 1929
