= Physoschistura chulabhornae =

Scientific classification
- Domain: Eukaryota
- Kingdom: Animalia
- Phylum: Chordata
- Class: Actinopterygii
- Order: Cypriniformes
- Family: Nemacheilidae
- Genus: Physoschistura
- Species: P. chulabhornae

Binomial name
- Physoschistura chulabhornae Suvarnaraksha, 2013

Species of fish

Physoschistura chulabhornae is a species of loach, a freshwater fish in the family Nemacheilidae. It was described in 2013 from the Chaophraya River drainage of the Chiangmai province of Thailand.
