= Labeo sp. nov. 'Mzima' =

Conservation status
- Vulnerable (IUCN 3.1)

Scientific classification
- Kingdom: Animalia
- Phylum: Chordata
- Class: Actinopterygii
- Order: Cypriniformes
- Family: Cyprinidae
- Subfamily: Labeoninae
- Genus: Labeo
- Species: L. sp. nov. 'Mzima'

Binomial name
- Labeo sp. nov. 'Mzima'

Species of fish

Labeo sp. nov. 'Mzima' is a formally undescribed species of freshwater fish in the family Cyprinidae, found only in springs in the Mzima Springs in Tsavo, Kenya. While lacking published information, it has been listed as vulnerable in the IUCN Red List of Threatened Species.
