= Enteromius niokoloensis =

Conservation status
- Least Concern (IUCN 3.1)

Scientific classification
- Domain: Eukaryota
- Kingdom: Animalia
- Phylum: Chordata
- Class: Actinopterygii
- Order: Cypriniformes
- Family: Cyprinidae
- Subfamily: Smiliogastrinae
- Genus: Enteromius
- Species: E. niokoloensis

Binomial name
- Enteromius niokoloensis (Daget, 1959)

Synonyms
- Barbus niokoloensis Daget, 1959

Species of fish

Enteromius niokoloensis is a species of ray-finned fish in the genus Enteromius from the Gambia River and Senegal River.

== Footnotes ==
- Froese, Rainer; Pauly, Daniel (eds.). "Enteromius niokoloensis". FishBase.
