= Enteromius dialonensis =

Conservation status
- Least Concern (IUCN 3.1)

Scientific classification
- Domain: Eukaryota
- Kingdom: Animalia
- Phylum: Chordata
- Class: Actinopterygii
- Order: Cypriniformes
- Family: Cyprinidae
- Subfamily: Smiliogastrinae
- Genus: Enteromius
- Species: E. dialonensis

Binomial name
- Enteromius dialonensis (Daget, 1962)

Synonyms
- Barbus dialonensis Daget, 1962

Species of fish

Enteromius dialonensis is a species of ray-finned fish in the genus Enteromius found in the upper Gambia River, upper Niger River and upper Senegal River in West Africa.

== Footnotes ==
- Froese, Rainer; Pauly, Daniel (eds.). "Enteromius dialonensis". FishBase.
