= Enteromius raimbaulti =

Conservation status
- Vulnerable (IUCN 3.1)

Scientific classification
- Domain: Eukaryota
- Kingdom: Animalia
- Phylum: Chordata
- Class: Actinopterygii
- Order: Cypriniformes
- Family: Cyprinidae
- Subfamily: Smiliogastrinae
- Genus: Enteromius
- Species: E. raimbaulti

Binomial name
- Enteromius raimbaulti (Daget, 1962)

Synonyms
- Barbus raimbaulti

Species of fish

Enteromius raimbaulti is a species of ray-finned fish in the genus Enteromius which is endemic to Guinea. It is threatened by the decline in water quality due to agricultural pollution and damming of the rivers it occurs in.

== Footnotes ==
- Froese, Rainer; Pauly, Daniel (eds.). "Enteromius raimbaulti". FishBase.
