= Hypostomus annectens =

Conservation status
- Vulnerable (IUCN 3.1)

Scientific classification
- Kingdom: Animalia
- Phylum: Chordata
- Class: Actinopterygii
- Division: Teleostei
- Order: Siluriformes
- Family: Loricariidae
- Genus: Hypostomus
- Species: H. annectens

Binomial name
- Hypostomus annectens (Regan, 1904)

Synonyms
- Ancistrus annectens Regan, 1904; Hemiancistrus annectens (Regan, 1904); Hemiancistrus fugleri Ovchynnyk 1971; Hemiancistrus fugleri Ovchynnyk, 1971

Species of fish

Hypostomus annectens is a species of freshwater ray-finned fish belonging to the family Loricariidae, the suckermouth armored catfishes, and the subfamily Hypostominae, the suckermouth catfishes. This catfish occurs in the Santiago-Cayapas River basin in northwestern Ecuador and in the Baudo, Patia and Guapi Rivers in southwestern Colombia. This species reaches a total length of 28 cm (11 in) and is believed to be a facultative air-breather.
