= Physoschistura elongata =

Conservation status
- Vulnerable (IUCN 3.1)

Scientific classification
- Kingdom: Animalia
- Phylum: Chordata
- Class: Actinopterygii
- Order: Cypriniformes
- Family: Nemacheilidae
- Genus: Physoschistura
- Species: P. elongata

Binomial name
- Physoschistura elongata N. Sen & Nalbant, 1982

Synonyms
- Nemacheilus barapaniensis Menon, 1987

Species of fish

Physoschistura elongata is a species of stone loach endemic to India. This species grows to a length of 5 centimetres (2.0 in) TL.

== Habitat ==
It is a freshwater, benthopelagic tropical fish, which lives in large lakes with a gravel substrate.

== Threats ==
It is prone to threats caused by natural disasters and anthropogenic impacts. In fact, its habitat is being destroyed by mining and human activities.
