= Paramormyrops hopkinsi =

Conservation status
- Vulnerable (IUCN 3.1)

Scientific classification
- Kingdom: Animalia
- Phylum: Chordata
- Class: Actinopterygii
- Division: Teleostei
- Order: Osteoglossiformes
- Family: Mormyridae
- Genus: Paramormyrops
- Species: P. hopkinsi

Binomial name
- Paramormyrops hopkinsi (Taverne & Thys van den Audenaerde, 1985)

Synonyms
- Brienomyrus hopkinsi Taverne & Thys van den Audenaerde, 1985

Species of ray-finned fish

Paramormyrops hopkinsi is a species of freshwater electric fish. It was discovered in the Ivindo River in Gabon, in west-Central Africa by Dr. Carl D. Hopkins of Cornell University. It is distributed throughout the Ivindo River basin of Gabon and the Ntem River basin of Cameroon. Described originally as a Brienomyrus in 1985 it was transferred to Paramormyrops in 2007. The electric discharge has two phases: a head-positive phase followed by a head-negative phase. The mean duration of the EOD is 2.8 ms for females, 2.96 for males. The Fourier transform of the EOD peaks at 536 Hz for females, 468 for males. Both male and female EODs have a head-negative voltage bump about 5 to 6 ms after the main head positive phase (arrows).

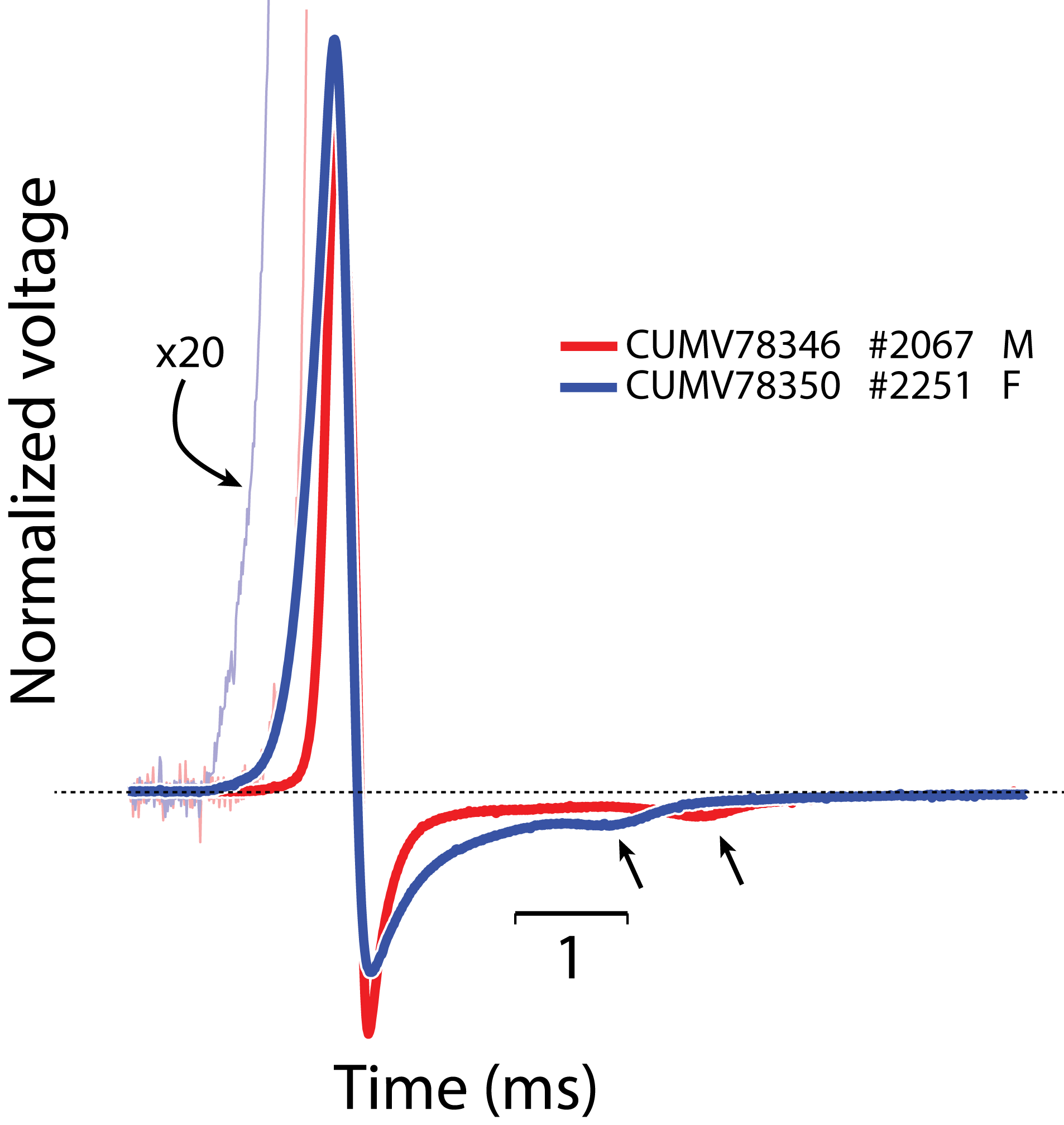

== Sources ==
- Cornell University (1998). "Brienomyrus hopkinsi - Photo by Dr. Carl D. Hopkins". Cornell University Department of Neurobiology and Behavior. Archived from the original on November 9, 2005.
- CTD's Brienomyrus hopkinsi page from the Comparative Toxicogenomics Database
- UniProt Taxonomy (2007). "Species Brienomyrus hopkinsi". UniProt Consortium.
