= Enteromius salessei =

Conservation status
- Least Concern (IUCN 3.1)

Scientific classification
- Domain: Eukaryota
- Kingdom: Animalia
- Phylum: Chordata
- Class: Actinopterygii
- Order: Cypriniformes
- Family: Cyprinidae
- Subfamily: Smiliogastrinae
- Genus: Enteromius
- Species: E. salessei

Binomial name
- Enteromius salessei (Pellegrin, 1908)

Synonyms
- Barbus salessei

Species of fish

Enteromius salessei is a species of ray-finned fish in the genus Enteromius which is found in the upper reaches of rivers in Guinea and Sierra Leone. Its populations are threatened by deforestation, urbanisation, water pollution and sedimentation.

== Footnotes ==
- Froese, Rainer; Pauly, Daniel (eds.). "Enteromius salessei". FishBase.
