= Marcusenius sp. nov. 'Turkwell' =

Conservation status
- Vulnerable (IUCN 3.1)

Scientific classification
- Kingdom: Animalia
- Phylum: Chordata
- Class: Actinopterygii
- Order: Osteoglossiformes
- Family: Mormyridae
- Genus: Marcusenius
- Species: M. sp. nov. 'Turkwell'

Binomial name
- Marcusenius sp. nov. 'Turkwell'

Species of fish

Marcusenius sp. nov. 'Turkwell' is a species of fish in the family Mormyridae. It is endemic to Kenya. Its natural habitat is rivers.
