= Glossogobius flavipinnis =

Conservation status
- Near Threatened (IUCN 3.1)

Scientific classification
- Kingdom: Animalia
- Phylum: Chordata
- Class: Actinopterygii
- Order: Gobiiformes
- Family: Gobiidae
- Genus: Glossogobius
- Species: G. flavipinnis

Binomial name
- Glossogobius flavipinnis (Aurich, 1938)

Synonyms
- Stupidogobius flavipinnis Aurich, 1938

Species of fish

Glossogobius flavipinnis is a species from the family Gobiidae endemic to Lake Towuti in Sulawesi, Indonesia, where it is generally found at shallow depths over hard bottoms. This species can reach a length of 8 cm (3.1 in) TL, although in a review of museum specimens the largest male was only 3.9 cm (1.5 in) and the largest female 5.7 cm (2.2 in). It is overall uniform dark with a yellow first dorsal fin. It was previously known under the name Stupidogobius flavipinnis.
