= Synodontis macrops =

Conservation status
- Data Deficient (IUCN 3.1)

Scientific classification
- Kingdom: Animalia
- Phylum: Chordata
- Class: Actinopterygii
- Order: Siluriformes
- Family: Mochokidae
- Genus: Synodontis
- Species: S. macrops

Binomial name
- Synodontis macrops Greenwood, 1963

Species of fish

Synodontis macrops is a species of upside-down catfish endemic to Uganda where it is found in the Aswa River basin. This species grows to a length of 17.3 centimetres (6.8 in) TL.
