= Synodontis arnoulti =

Conservation status
- Least Concern (IUCN 3.1)

Scientific classification
- Domain: Eukaryota
- Kingdom: Animalia
- Phylum: Chordata
- Class: Actinopterygii
- Order: Siluriformes
- Family: Mochokidae
- Genus: Synodontis
- Species: S. arnoulti

Binomial name
- Synodontis arnoulti Román, 1966

Species of fish

Synodontis arnoulti is a species of upside-down catfish native to the Volta River basin of Burkina Faso and Ghana. This species grows to a length of 13.6 centimetres (5.4 in) TL.
