= Garra smartae =

Conservation status
- Vulnerable (IUCN 3.1)

Scientific classification
- Kingdom: Animalia
- Phylum: Chordata
- Class: Actinopterygii
- Order: Cypriniformes
- Family: Cyprinidae
- Subfamily: Labeoninae
- Genus: Garra
- Species: G. smartae

Binomial name
- Garra smartae Krupp & Budd, 2009

Synonyms
- Garra smarti Krupp & Budd, 2009 (misspelling)

Species of fish

Garra smartae, the Hasik Garra, is a species of cyprinid fish in the genus Garra from Oman. The specific name honours Emma Smart for her studies of the fish faunas of the wadis of the Arabian Peninsula. The original specific name smarti was amended to smartae to reflect the correct gender of the person being honoured.
