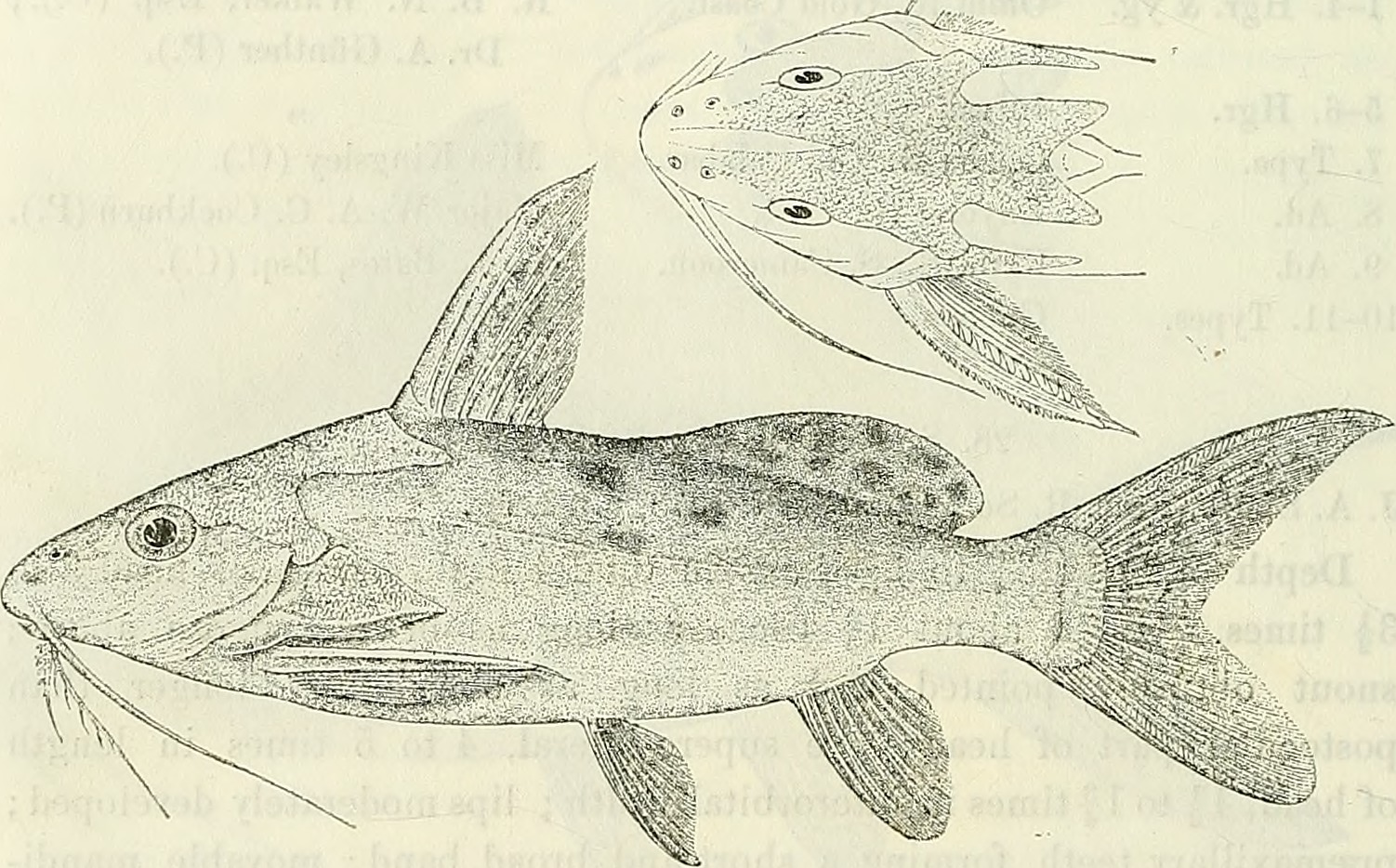

Conservation status
- Data Deficient (IUCN 3.1)

Scientific classification
- Kingdom: Animalia
- Phylum: Chordata
- Class: Actinopterygii
- Order: Siluriformes
- Family: Mochokidae
- Genus: Synodontis
- Species: S. robbianus

Binomial name
- Synodontis robbianus Smith, 1875

= Synodontis robbianus =

Species of fish

Synodontis robbianus, known as the russet synodontis, is a species of upside-down catfish that is native to Nigeria where it is found in the Cross and lower Niger Rivers. It was first described by John Alexander Smith in 1875, from specimens collected in the Calabar River, Nigeria. The species name robbianus is named after Rev. Alexander Robb, a Scottish missionary, who collected the original species samples.

== Description ==
Like all members of the genus Synodontis, S. robbianus has a strong, bony head capsule that extends back as far as the first spine of the dorsal fin. The head contains a distinct narrow, bony, external protrusion called a humeral process. The shape and size of the humeral process helps to identify the species. In S. robbianus, the humeral process is about 1 1/2 to 2 times as long as it is broad, rough, and with a ridge on the lower edge.

The fish has three pairs of barbels. The maxillary barbels are on located on the upper jaw, and two pairs of mandibular barbels are on the lower jaw. The maxillary barbel is long and straight without any branches, with a broad membrane at the base. It extends to a length of about 1 1/4 to 1 1/2 times the length of the head. The outer pair of mandibular barbels is a little under twice the length of the inner pair; and the outer pair with moderately long branches and the inner pair with secondary branches present.

The front edges of the dorsal fins and the pectoral fins of Syntontis species are hardened into stiff spines. In S. robbianus, the spine of the dorsal fin is about 2/3 to 3/4 times the length of the head, slightly curved, smooth in the front and serrated on the back. The remaining portion of the dorsal fin is made up of seven branching rays. The spine of the pectoral fin is a little longer than the size of the dorsal spine, and serrated on both sides. The adipose fin is 2 1/2 to 3 1/2 times as long as it is deep. The anal fin contains three to four unbranched and eight or nine branched rays. The tail, or caudal fin, is deeply forked, with the upper lobe longer.

All members of Syndontis have a structure called a premaxillary toothpad, which is located on the very front of the upper jaw of the mouth. This structure contains several rows of short, chisel-shaped teeth. In S. robbianus, the toothpad forms a short and broad band. On the lower jaw, or mandible, the teeth of Syndontis are attached to flexible, stalk-like structures and described as "s-shaped" or "hooked". The number of teeth on the mandible is used to differentiate between species; in S. robbianus, there are about 15 to 20 teeth on the mandible.

The body color is pale brown, blotched or mottled with darker brown. The ventral and anal fins are dark, the dorsal and caudal fins are lighter. Juveniles show a light streak on each side of the snout, and cross-bars on the dorsal, anal, and caudal fins.

The maximum total length of the species is 13.8 centimetres (5.4 in). Generally, females in the genus Synodontis tend to be slightly larger than males of the same age.

== Habitat and behavior ==
In the wild, the species has only been found in the Cross and lower Niger Rivers. It lives in streams and lakes and eats plankton, detritus, and plants. It is capable of breathing air, and can live in waters with low dissolved oxygen. The reproductive habits of most of the species of Synodontis are not known, beyond some instances of obtaining egg counts from gravid females. Spawning likely occurs during the flooding season between July and October, and pairs swim in unison during spawning. The growth rate is rapid in the first year, then slows down as the fish age.
