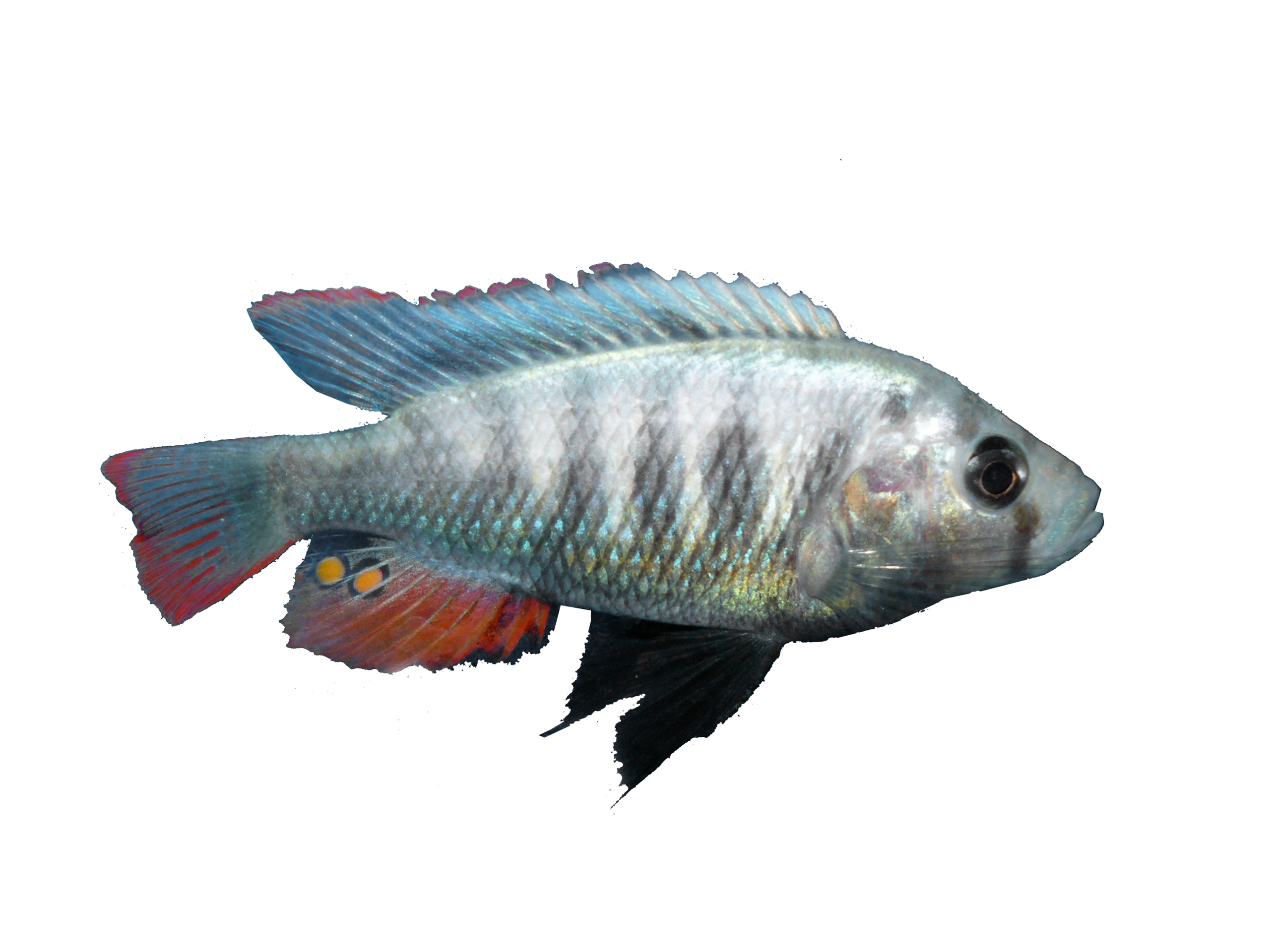

Conservation status
- Least Concern (IUCN 3.1)

Scientific classification
- Kingdom: Animalia
- Phylum: Chordata
- Class: Actinopterygii
- Order: Cichliformes
- Family: Cichlidae
- Genus: Haplochromis
- Species: H. pundamilia

Binomial name
- Haplochromis pundamilia (Seehausen & Bouton, 1998)

Synonyms
- Pundamilia pundamilia Seehausen & Bouton, 1998

= Haplochromis pundamilia =

Species of fish

Haplochromis pundamilia is a species of cichlid endemic to the Tanzanian portions of Lake Victoria. This species can reach a length of 12.4 centimetres (4.9 in) SL.
