= Enteromius eburneensis =

Conservation status
- Least Concern (IUCN 3.1)

Scientific classification
- Kingdom: Animalia
- Phylum: Chordata
- Class: Actinopterygii
- Order: Cypriniformes
- Family: Cyprinidae
- Subfamily: Smiliogastrinae
- Genus: Enteromius
- Species: E. eburneensis

Binomial name
- Enteromius eburneensis Poll, 1941

Synonyms
- Barbus eburneensis Poll, 1941

Species of fish

Enteromius eburneensis is a species of ray-finned fish in the genus Enteromius which is found in the rivers flowing from Mount Nimba in West Africa.

== Footnotes ==
- Froese, Rainer; Pauly, Daniel (eds.). "Enteromius eburneensis". FishBase.
