= Enteromius bagbwensis =

Conservation status
- Critically Endangered (IUCN 3.1)

Scientific classification
- Kingdom: Animalia
- Phylum: Chordata
- Class: Actinopterygii
- Order: Cypriniformes
- Family: Cyprinidae
- Subfamily: Smiliogastrinae
- Genus: Enteromius
- Species: E. bagbwensis

Binomial name
- Enteromius bagbwensis (Norman, 1932)

Synonyms
- Barbus bagbwensis Norman, 1932

Species of fish

Enteromius bagbwensis is a species of freshwater benthopelagic ray-finned fish in the genus Enteromius it is endemic to the Bagbwe River in Sierra Leone. The current maximum length is a 9.6 cm male.

== Description ==
This fish has 12 scales around caudal peduncle, 8 branched dorsal fin rays, and two pairs of rather long barbels. The anterior barbel does not reach to the anterior margin of the eye. It has a posterior barbel extending beyond the hind margin of its eye. This fish also has a complete lateral line and slightly depressed below dorsal fin.
