= Synodontis macrophthalmus =

Conservation status
- Critically Endangered (IUCN 3.1)

Scientific classification
- Domain: Eukaryota
- Kingdom: Animalia
- Phylum: Chordata
- Class: Actinopterygii
- Order: Siluriformes
- Family: Mochokidae
- Genus: Synodontis
- Species: S. macrophthalmus

Binomial name
- Synodontis macrophthalmus Poll, 1971

Species of fish

Synodontis macrophthalmus is a species of upside-down catfish endemic to Ghana where it occurs in the Volta River basin. This species grows to a length of 20 centimetres (7.9 in) TL.
