= Enteromius foutensis =

Conservation status
- Endangered (IUCN 3.1)

Scientific classification
- Kingdom: Animalia
- Phylum: Chordata
- Class: Actinopterygii
- Order: Cypriniformes
- Family: Cyprinidae
- Subfamily: Smiliogastrinae
- Genus: Enteromius
- Species: E. foutensis

Binomial name
- Enteromius foutensis (Lévêque, Teugels & Thys van den Audenaerde, 1988)

Synonyms
- Barbus foutensis Lévêque, Teugels & Thys van den Audenaerde, 1988

Species of fish

Enteromius foutensis is a species of ray-finned fish in the genus Enteromius. It has been found in the Little Scarcies River that flows through Guinea and Sierra Leone.
