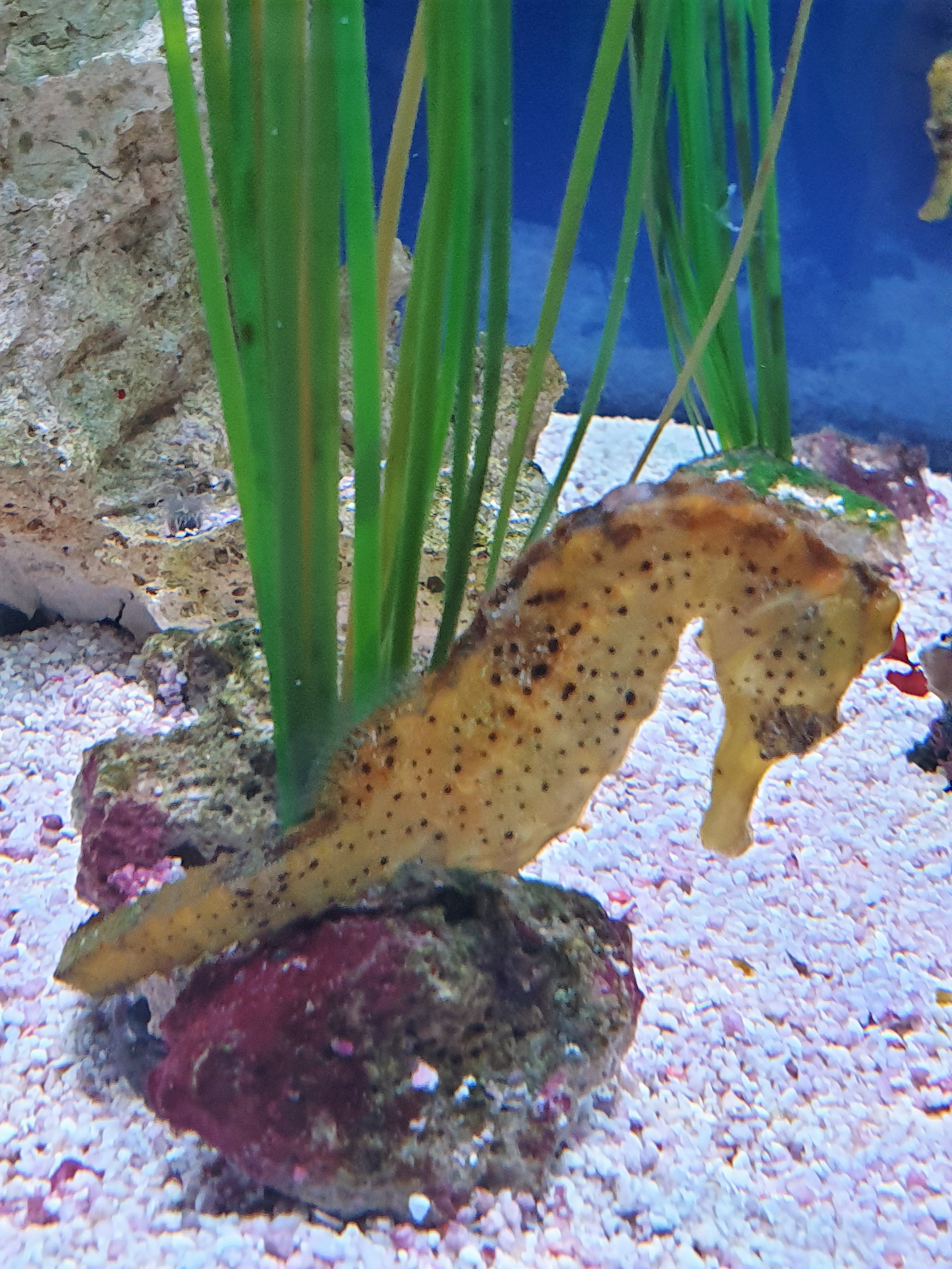
- At Sea Life Hanover, Germany

Conservation status
- Vulnerable (IUCN 3.1)
- CITES Appendix II

Scientific classification
- Kingdom: Animalia
- Phylum: Chordata
- Class: Actinopterygii
- Order: Syngnathiformes
- Family: Syngnathidae
- Genus: Hippocampus
- Species: H. kuda

Binomial name
- Hippocampus kuda Bleeker, 1852

Synonyms
- Hippocampus fuscus Rüppell, 1838; Hippocampus moluccensis Bleeker, 1852; Hippocampus taeniopterus Bleeker, 1852; Hippocampus polytaenia Bleeker, 1854; Hippocampus melanospilos Bleeker, 1854; Hippocampus chinensis Basilewsky, 1855; Hippocampus rhynchomacer Duméril, 1870; Hippocampus borboniensis Duméril, 1870; Hippocampus tristis Castelnau, 1872; Hippocampus aterrimus Jordan & Snyder, 1902; Hippocampus hilonis Jordan & Evermann, 1903; Hippocampus taeniops Fowler, 1904; Hippocampus natalensis {von Bonde, 1923; Hippocampus horai Duncker, 1926; Hippocampus novaehebudorum Fowler, 1944; Hippocampus raji Whitley, 1955

= Hippocampus kuda =

Species of seahorse

Hippocampus kuda is a species of seahorse, also known as the common seahorse, estuary seahorse, yellow seahorse or spotted seahorse. The common name sea pony has been used for populations formerly treated as the separate species Hippocampus fuscus, now a synonym of H. kuda.

== Physical description ==
The yellow seahorse is a small fish that can reach a length of 17–30 cm (6.7–11.8 in). The body is quite large, elongated, and has no spines, all bumps are rounded. The head is relatively large compared to the body. The snout is short and thick. The coronet is small and rises towards the rear, it can also sometimes have more or less long filaments. Some adults have a black line running through the dorsal fin in the direction of its width. The body coloration is often dark with a grainy texture but can also be yellow, cream, or reddish blotches and numerous small dark spots.

The seahorse possesses a tail that is used as a bending and grasping appendage. The seahorse is able to bend its tail ventrally due to its possession of body plates. The hypoxia muscle is responsible for bending the seahorse's tail. The plates send forces to the hypoxia muscles to ensure bending of the tail. These functions of the musculoskeletal system allow us to understand the anatomy of seahorses in further depth.

== Distribution and habitat ==
Hippocampus kuda inhabits waters from the Persian Gulf to Southeast Asia, Australia, Japan, and several Pacific islands including Hawaii, and is also found the eastern coast of Africa from Tanzania to South Africa, including the Indo-Pacific region ranging from the northwest Indian Ocean to the central areas of the Pacific Ocean. The majority of H. kuda populates the Chinese coast down to Australia.

H. kuda inhabit estuaries, lagoons, harbors, littoral zones, and coastal seagrass beds, where they are found in shallow waters of up to fifty-five meters in depth. Their habitat regions can include (but are not limited to) tropical, saltwater, or marine regions.

== Biological development and reproduction ==
The mating system of H. kuda is completely monogamous. The species engages in a unique courtship ritual before engaging in mating. The male will change its color patterns and dance around the female and while producing a clicking with the coronet. Eventually, the tails of the male and female intertwine and the female will place her eggs into the male's ventral brood pouch via an ovipositor. There may be up to one-thousand eggs in a singular pouch, where the developmental process can last from twenty to twenty-eight days. Birth, however, depends largely on the monsoon patterns, lunar cycles, and water temperature. Males typically go into labor during a full moon, and after birth, the baby seahorses average a length of seven millimeters.

== Predation ==
H. kuda are omnivores, feeding on minuscule living prey, such as larval fishes and zooplankton, via suction feeding. They are not strong swimmers. Predators of H. kuda include crabs, rays, tuna, and sea turtles, as well as humans.

== Importance to humans ==
H. kuda are extremely valuable to the traditional Chinese medicine trade. H. kuda has been said to regulate nervous, reproductive, endocrine, and immune systems. 25 million seahorses are used every year for medicinal purposes. The largest known exporters of H. kuda are Vietnam, India, the Philippines, and Thailand.

== In the aquarium ==
H. kuda is a popular species among aquarium keepers. Common seahorses have very small mouths, eating only small animals like brine shrimp and even newborn guppies. Seahorses need to eat approximately 4–5 times daily. Many aquarists who have kept H. kuda cultivate their own brine shrimp and rotifers. Daphnia is eaten when other foods are unavailable.

Seahorses spend most of their time anchoring to coral reefs and branches with their tails because they are poor swimmers. They therefore need similar anchor points in the aquarium. Seahorses like a quiet tank, without large, belligerent fish, and a slow-moving current. Aquarists have found them to be generally accepting of tankmates like Synchiropus splendidus and other bottom-dwelling fishes.

=== Temperature, pH, and salinity ===
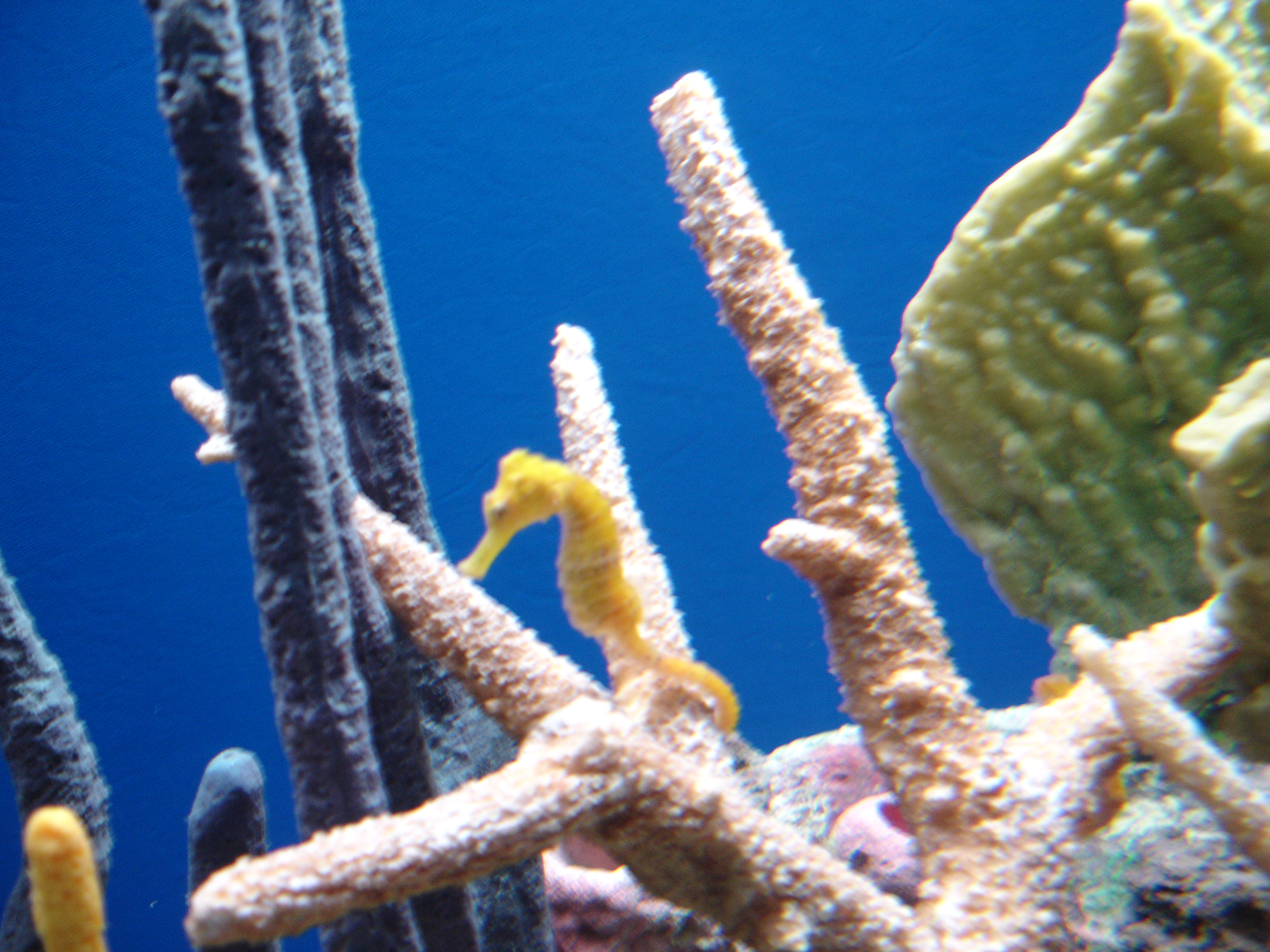
Yellow seahorse in an aquarium

Common seahorses generally do best at a temperature of 72–77 °F (22–25 °C), optimally 73–75 °F (23–24 °C). They do not tolerate even spikes above 80 °F (27 °C) well. Their optimal pH range is around 8.1–8.4. The common seahorse can tolerate a range of salinity from 18 parts per thousand (ppt) to 36 ppt but salinity below about 25ppt should be promptly corrected. About 32 ppt is ideal.

== Conservation status ==
The species is still commonly encountered (especially in Indonesia and New Guinea) but is currently classified as vulnerable by the IUCN, as populations face some threat from bycatch in the shrimp trawl fishery, targeted catch for the aquarium and traditional medicine trade, and habitat destruction, coupled with low fecundity due to the involved method of parental brood care. Internationally, it is also listed in Appendix II of the Convention on International Trade in Endangered Species of Wild Fauna and Flora (CITES), which means that it is not necessarily threatened with extinction, but its trade must still be controlled in order to avoid utilization incompatible with their survival. Populations of H. kuda have declined by 30% in the last few decades due to pollution, habitat destruction, and illegal trading in Chinese medicine.
