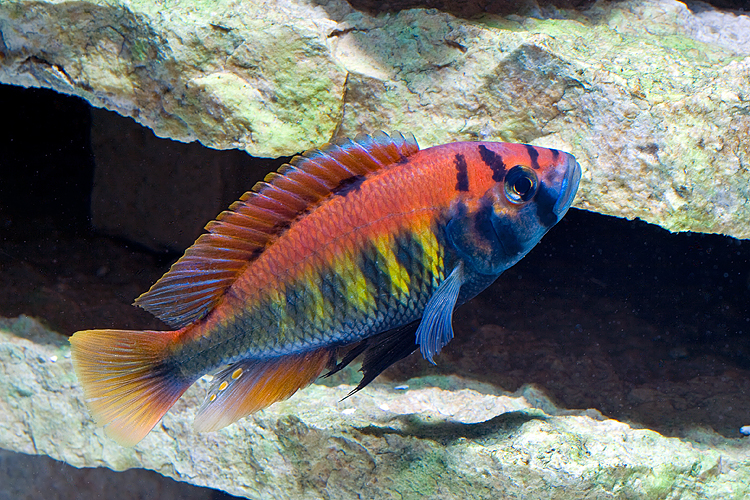

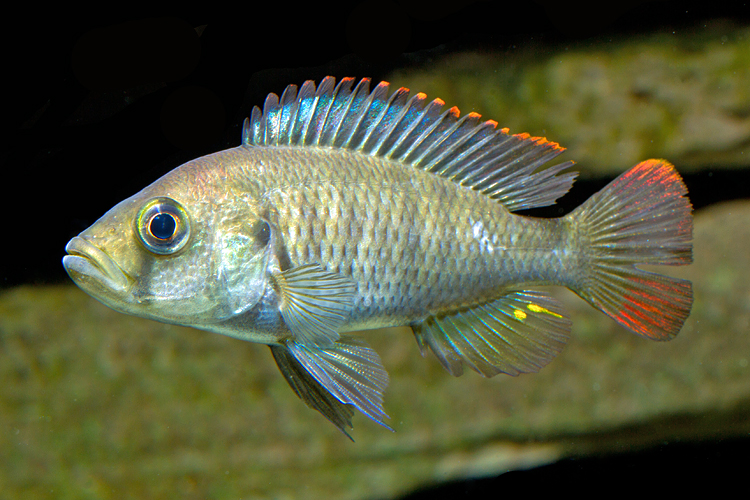
- Male above, female below

Conservation status
- Least Concern (IUCN 3.1)

Scientific classification
- Kingdom: Animalia
- Phylum: Chordata
- Class: Actinopterygii
- Order: Cichliformes
- Family: Cichlidae
- Genus: Haplochromis
- Species: H. nyererei

Binomial name
- Haplochromis nyererei Witte-Maas & F. Witte, 1985

Synonyms
- Pundamilia nyererei (Witte-Maas & Witte, 1985); Pundamilia nyerere (lapsus)

= Haplochromis nyererei =

Cichlid fish from Lake Victoria named after Julius Nyerere

Haplochromis nyererei is a species of cichlid endemic to Lake Victoria in Africa. This species can reach a length of 7.7 centimetres (3.0 in) SL. The specific name honours Julius Nyerere (1922–1999), who was president of Tanzania from 1961 to 1985.

The females of Haplochromis species prefer male Haplochromis nyererei that are more colorful and brighter compared to the dull male Haplochromis.
