= Haplochromis xanthopteryx =

Conservation status
- Vulnerable (IUCN 3.1)

Scientific classification
- Kingdom: Animalia
- Phylum: Chordata
- Class: Actinopterygii
- Order: Cichliformes
- Family: Cichlidae
- Genus: Haplochromis
- Species: H. xanthopteryx

Binomial name
- Haplochromis xanthopteryx (Seehausen & Bouton, 1998)

Synonyms
- Lithochromis xanthopteryx Seehausen & Bouton, 1998

Species of fish

Haplochromis xanthopteryx is a species of cichlid endemic to Lake Victoria where it is only known to occur in the Mwanza Gulf in areas with rocky substrates. This species can reach a length of 10.7 centimetres (4.2 in) SL. It can also be found in the aquarium trade. This species may be placed back in the genus Lithochromis when a comprehensive review of Haplochromis is carried out.
