= Haplochromis azureus =

Conservation status
- Vulnerable (IUCN 3.1)

Scientific classification
- Kingdom: Animalia
- Phylum: Chordata
- Class: Actinopterygii
- Order: Cichliformes
- Family: Cichlidae
- Genus: Haplochromis
- Species: H. azureus

Binomial name
- Haplochromis azureus (Seehausen & Lippitsch, 1998)

Synonyms
- Pundamilia azurea Seehausen & Lippitsch, 1998

Species of fish

Haplochromis azureus is a species of haplochromine cichlid which is endemic to groups of islands in the middle part of the Speke Gulf in the Tanzanian part Lake Victoria. It is restricted to areas of steep, rocky beds where the females and non breeding males congregate in shoals which are often mixed with Haplochromis nyererei. The breeding males are territorial and they are polygynous female mouthbrooders with only the female caring for the eggs and fry. They feed on zooplankton.
