= Menderes barbel =

Conservation status
- Vulnerable (IUCN 3.1)

Scientific classification
- Kingdom: Animalia
- Phylum: Chordata
- Class: Actinopterygii
- Order: Cypriniformes
- Family: Cyprinidae
- Subfamily: Barbinae
- Genus: Luciobarbus
- Species: L. kottelati

Binomial name
- Luciobarbus kottelati Turan, Ekmekçi, İlhan & Engin, 2008

Species of fish

The Menderes barbel (Luciobarbus kottelati) is a species of ray-finned fish in the genus Luciobarbus from the Büyük Menderes River basin in Turkey.

The fish is named in honor of Swiss ichthyologist Maurice Kottelat (b. 1957), because of his contributions to the knowledge of European and Asian fishes.
