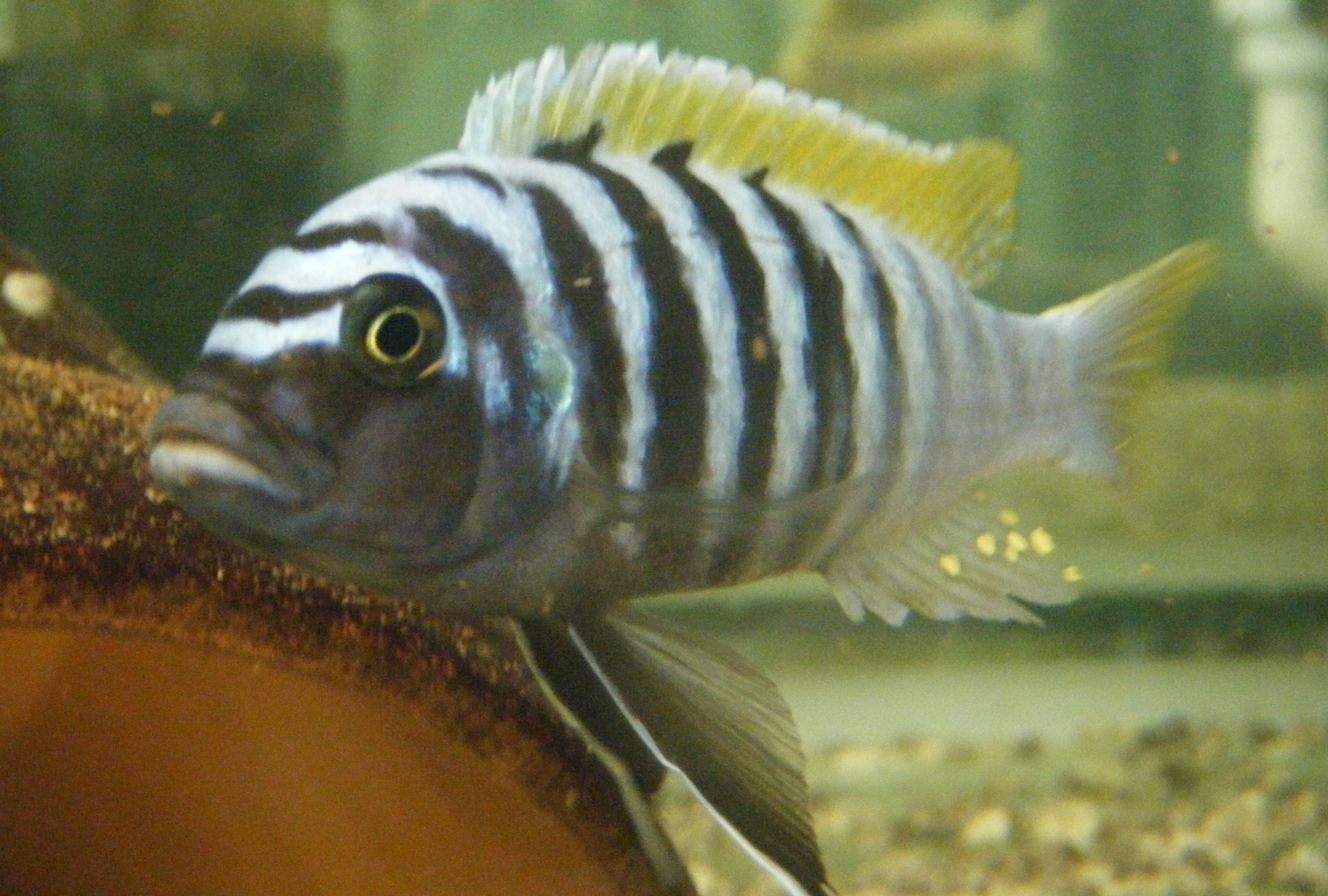
- Male Maylandia pyrsonotos
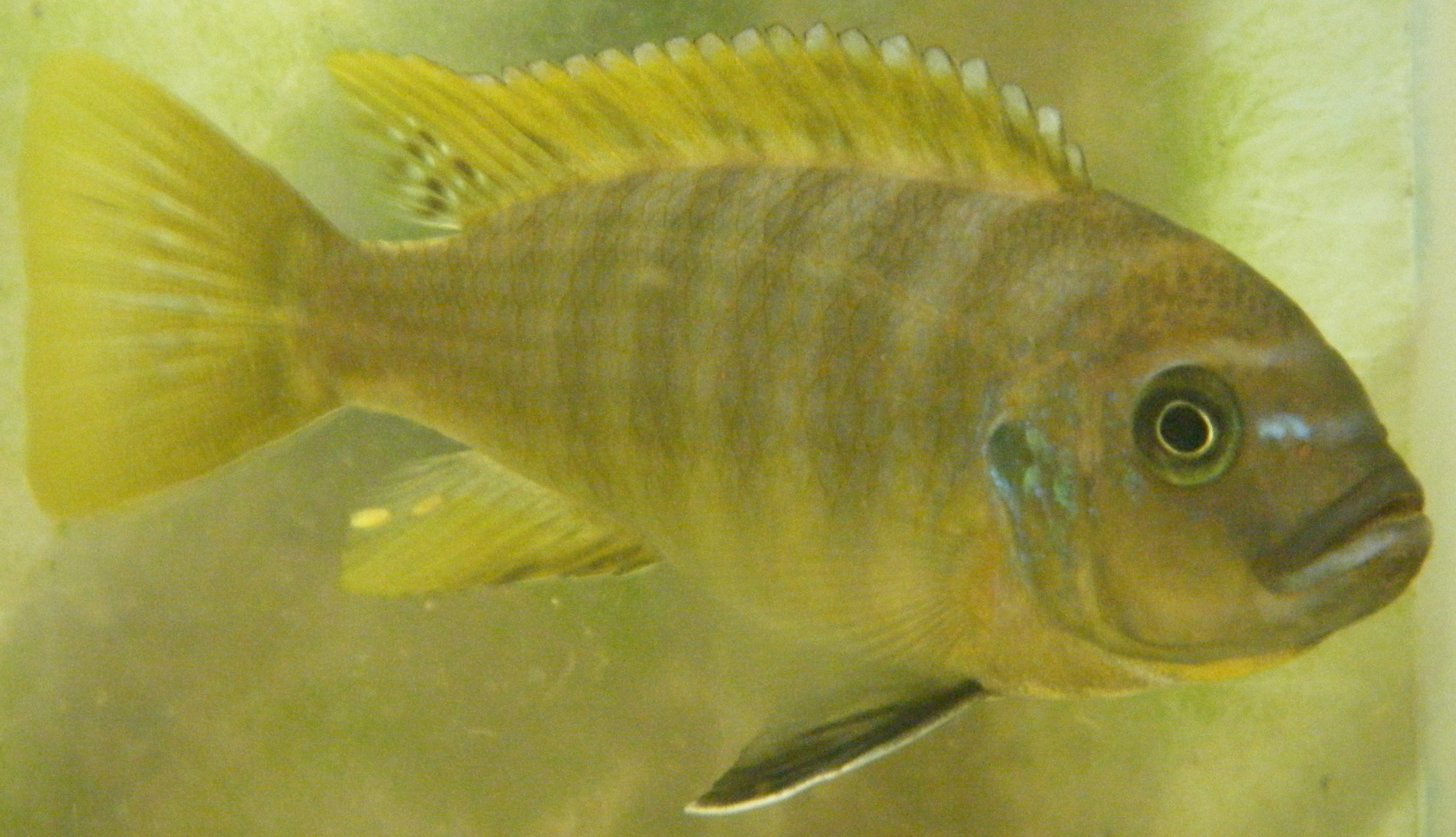
- Female Maylandia pyrsonotos

Conservation status
- Least Concern (IUCN 3.1)

Scientific classification
- Kingdom: Animalia
- Phylum: Chordata
- Class: Actinopterygii
- Order: Cichliformes
- Family: Cichlidae
- Genus: Maylandia
- Species: M. pyrsonotos

Binomial name
- Maylandia pyrsonotos (Stauffer, Bowers, Kellogg & McKaye, 1997)

Synonyms
- Maylandia sandaracinos (Stauffer, Bowers, Kellogg & McKaye, 1997); Maylandia thapsinogen (Stauffer, Bowers, Kellogg & McKaye, 1997); Metriaclima thapsinogen Stauffer, Bowers, Kellogg & McKaye, 1997

= Maylandia pyrsonotos =

Species of fish

Maylandia pyrsonotos is a species of cichlid endemic to Lake Malawi where it occurs naturally around Nakatenga Island and has been introduced to the waters around Maleri Island. This species can reach a length of 7.7 centimetres (3.0 in) SL. It is also found in the aquarium trade.
