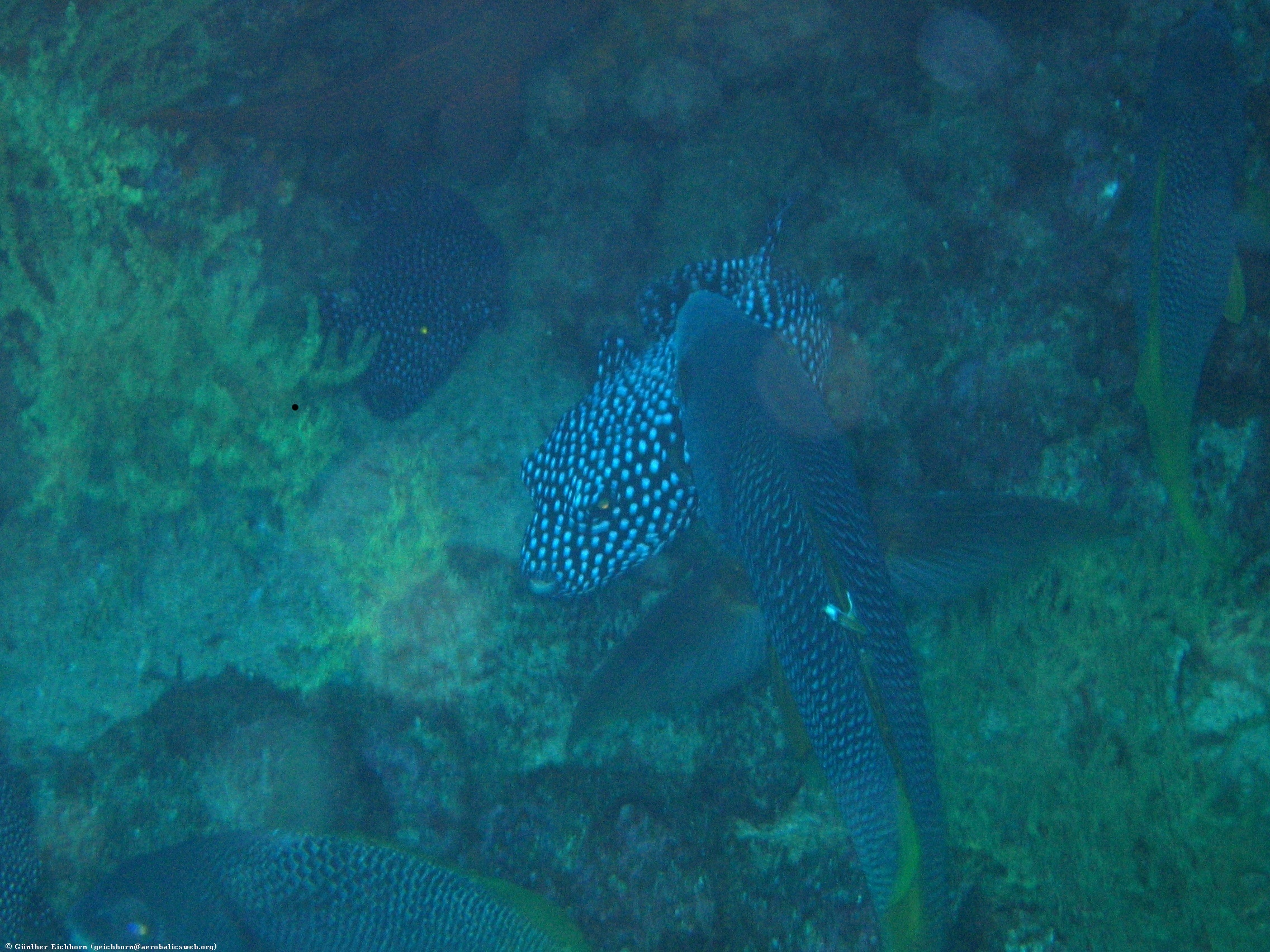
- Halichoeres adustus (darker fish) around a Guineafowl pufferfish (Arothron meleagris) (lighter fish)

Conservation status
- Vulnerable (IUCN 3.1)

Scientific classification
- Kingdom: Animalia
- Phylum: Chordata
- Class: Actinopterygii
- Division: Teleostei
- Order: Labriformes
- Family: Labridae
- Genus: Halichoeres
- Species: H. adustus

Binomial name
- Halichoeres adustus (C. H. Gilbert, 1890)

Synonyms
- Pseudojulis adustus C. H. Gilbert, 1890

= Black wrasse =

Species of fish

The black wrasse (Halichoeres adustus) is a species of wrasse native to the eastern Pacific Ocean around Cocos Island, the Revillagigedo Islands, Tres Marias Islands, and the Galapagos. This species prefers areas with rocky bottoms at depths from 1 to 3 m (3.3 to 9.8 ft). It can reach 12.5 cm (4.9 in) in total length.
