= Haplochromis gigas =

Conservation status
- Vulnerable (IUCN 3.1)

Scientific classification
- Kingdom: Animalia
- Phylum: Chordata
- Class: Actinopterygii
- Order: Cichliformes
- Family: Cichlidae
- Genus: Haplochromis
- Species: H. gigas

Binomial name
- Haplochromis gigas (Seehausen & Lippitsch, 1998)

Species of fish

Haplochromis gigas is a species of cichlid endemic to Lake Victoria where it is only known to occur with certainty in the Speke Gulf, though its presence is suspected in other portions of the lake. Its preferred habitat is gently sloping areas with rocky substrates. This species can reach a length of 14.2 centimetres (5.6 in) SL.
