= Gorogobius stevcici =

Conservation status
- Vulnerable (IUCN 3.1)

Scientific classification
- Kingdom: Animalia
- Phylum: Chordata
- Class: Actinopterygii
- Order: Gobiiformes
- Family: Gobiidae
- Genus: Gorogobius
- Species: G. stevcici

Binomial name
- Gorogobius stevcici Kovačić & Schliewen, 2008

Species of fish

Gorogobius stevcici (English name: Stevcic's goby) is a species of gobies in the family of Gobiidae, endemic to the coastal waters of the islands of São Tomé and Príncipe, where it occurs at depths from 15 to 40 m (49 to 131 ft). The species was named and described by Kovačić and Schliewen in 2008. The fish grows to a maximum of 3.3 cm in length for males and 2.3 cm for females.
