= Barboides gracilis =

Conservation status
- Vulnerable (IUCN 3.1)

Scientific classification
- Kingdom: Animalia
- Phylum: Chordata
- Class: Actinopterygii
- Order: Cypriniformes
- Family: Cyprinidae
- Subfamily: Smiliogastrinae
- Genus: Barboides
- Species: B. gracilis

Binomial name
- Barboides gracilis Brüning, 1929

Synonyms
- Barbus lorenzi Loiselle & Welcomme, 1971; Raddabarbus camerunensis Thys van den Audenaerde, 1971

Species of fish

Barboides gracilis is a species of ray-finned fish in the carp and minnow family, Cyprinidae which occurs in small, slow flowing rivers in forests in the coastal lowlands in West Africa from Benin to Equatorial Guinea. It is a small species of 1.8 cm (0.71 in) in length which feeds mainly on aquatic plants and detritus. It is threatened by habitat destruction caused by barrage fishing, development and oil exploration.
