= Haplochromis macrocephalus =

Conservation status
- Vulnerable (IUCN 3.1)

Scientific classification
- Kingdom: Animalia
- Phylum: Chordata
- Class: Actinopterygii
- Order: Cichliformes
- Family: Cichlidae
- Genus: Haplochromis
- Species: H. macrocephalus

Binomial name
- Haplochromis macrocephalus (Seehausen & Bouton, 1998)

Synonyms
- Pundamilia macrocephala Seehausen & Bouton, 1998

Species of fish

Haplochromis macrocephalus is a species of cichlid endemic to the Tanzanian portion of Lake Victoria where it is found in Mwanza Gulf and Speke Gulf. This species can reach a length of 10.6 centimetres (4.2 in) SL.
