= Enteromius choloensis =

Conservation status
- Data Deficient (IUCN 3.1)

Scientific classification
- Kingdom: Animalia
- Phylum: Chordata
- Class: Actinopterygii
- Order: Cypriniformes
- Family: Cyprinidae
- Subfamily: Smiliogastrinae
- Genus: Enteromius
- Species: E. choloensis

Binomial name
- Enteromius choloensis (Norman, 1925)

Synonyms
- Barbus choloensis Norman, 1925

Species of fish

Enteromius choloensis, or the silver barb, is a species of freshwater fish in the family Cyprinidae.

It is found only in Malawi.

Its natural habitat is rivers.

It is found only on the Ruo River and its tributary the Nswadzi River on the Thyolo escarpment above Zoa Falls. The Ruo is a tributary of the Shire River, part of the Zambezi system.
