= Labeobarbus ruwenzorii =

Conservation status
- Vulnerable (IUCN 3.1)

Scientific classification
- Kingdom: Animalia
- Phylum: Chordata
- Class: Actinopterygii
- Order: Cypriniformes
- Family: Cyprinidae
- Subfamily: Torinae
- Genus: Labeobarbus
- Species: L. ruwenzorii

Binomial name
- Labeobarbus ruwenzorii (Pellegrin, 1909)

Synonyms
- Capoeta ruwenzorii Pellegrin, 1909; Varicorhinus ruwenzorii (Pellegrin, 1909)

Species of fish

Labeobarbus ruwenzorii is a species of ray-finned fish in the family Cyprinidae. It is found only in Uganda. Its natural habitat is rivers. It reproduces by inserting its seminiferous tubules into the mate's orifice, resulting in the discharge of unfertilised spawn.

== Classification / Names ==
Common names of Labeobarbus ruwenzorii also called "Chramule ruvenzorská" in Czechia, "Ruwensori lõunaramul" in Estonia.
