= Frans Witte =

Dutch ichthyologist

- Born: 16 December 1950; Zeist, the Netherlands
- Died: 12 February 2013 (aged 62)
- Education: Leiden University
- Scientific career
- Fields: Evolutionary biology Ecology Ichthyology
- Thesis: From Form to Fishery. An ecological and taxonomical contribution to morphology and fishery of Lake Victoria cichlids (1987)

Frans Witte (16 December 1950 – 12 February 2013) was a Dutch evolutionary biologist and ichthyologist, best known for his research on Lake Victoria cichlids. He was affiliated with Leiden University and the Naturalis Biodiversity Center in the Netherlands, where he conducted long-term studies on cichlid taxonomy, ecology, evolution, and the impacts of environmental change on biodiversity.

== Early life and education ==
Witte was born on 16 December 1950, in Zeist, the Netherlands. In 1958, he emigrated with his parents to Suriname, where he completed his secondary education. He later returned to the Netherlands, earning a bachelor's degree in biology in 1973 and a PhD in 1987 from Leiden University.

== Career and research ==
In 1977, Witte joined the Institute of Biology at Leiden University and moved with his wife, Els Witte‑Maas, and colleague Marteen van Oijen to Mwanza, Tanzania, as part of the Haplochromis Ecology Survey Team (HEST). During the first five years of his appointment, Witte conducted fieldwork in Lake Victoria documenting the diversity of haplochromine cichlids, a group that had radiated into more than 500 endemic species over a relatively short geological period. In 1982, he became the director of HEST, where he supervised extensive surveys that documented the diversity, morphology, and ecology of Lake Victoria's cichlids.

Witte's early research focused on the taxonomy and ecology of Lake Victoria cichlids, particularly species adapted to distinct ecological niches such as algae grazers, detritivores, insectivores, and piscivores. He collaborated with East African and international researchers to document species flocks and characterize fine-scale morphological differences among them.

Throughout the 1980s and 1990s, Witte documented the collapse of many endemic cichlid populations in Lake Victoria, caused by the introduction of the Nile perch (Lates niloticus), eutrophication, and climate change. He witnessed numerous species disappear, a phenomenon that was described in the book Darwin’s Dreampond by Tijs Goldschmidt. His observations demonstrated the fragility of species boundaries and became central to understanding evolutionary resilience, speciation reversal, and extinction in sympatric radiations. He also recorded signs of adaptive recovery, including the reappearance of some species and the formation of hybrid swarms, showing that evolutionary processes continued to operate under altered ecological conditions.

In addition to his research, Witte was also a dedicated educator and mentor. At Leiden University, he was voted Best Teacher in Biology (2005) and Best Teacher in the Faculty (2009) in recognition of his contributions to teaching. He trained Dutch and African students in field ecology and ichthyology, collaborating with institutions in Kenya, Uganda, and Tanzania.

During his career, Witte authored over 100 scientific publications and described many new cichlid species.

== Personal life ==
Witte was married to Dutch ichthyologist Els L.M. Witte-Maas. He died from cancer on 12 February 2013.

== Selected Publications ==
- Seehausen, Ole; Alphen, Jacques J. M. van; Witte, Frans (1997). "Cichlid Fish Diversity Threatened by Eutrophication That Curbs Sexual Selection". Science. 277 (5333): 1808–1811. doi:10.1126/science.277.5333.1808.
- Witte, F.; Msuku, B.S.; Wanink, J.H.; Seehausen, O.; Katunzi, E.F.B.; Goudswaard, P.C.; Goldschmidt, T. (2000). "Recovery of cichlid species in Lake Victoria: An examination of factors leading to differential extinction". Reviews in Fish Biology and Fisheries. 10 (2): 233–241. Bibcode:2000RFBF...10..233W. doi:10.1023/A:1016677515930.
- Witte, Frans; Goldschmidt, Tijs; Wanink, Jan; Van Oijen, Martien; Goudswaard, Kees; Witte-Maas, Els; Bouton, Niels (1992). "The destruction of an endemic species flock: Quantitative data on the decline of the haplochromine cichlids of Lake Victoria". Environmental Biology of Fishes. 34 (1): 1–28. Bibcode:1992EnvBF..34....1W. doi:10.1007/BF00004782.
- Witte, F.; Barel, C.D.N.; Witte-Maas, Els L.M.; Van Oijen, M.J.P. (1976). "An Introduction to the Taxonomy and Morphology of the Haplochromine Cichlidae from Lake Victoria". Netherlands Journal of Zoology. 27 (4): 333–380. doi:10.1163/002829677X00199.
- Goldschmidt, Tijs; Witte, Frans; Wanink, Jan (1993). "Cascading Effects of the Introduced Nile Perch on the Detritivorous/Phytoplanktivorous Species in the Sublittoral Areas of Lake Victoria". Conservation Biology. 7 (3): 686–700. doi:10.1046/j.1523-1739.1993.07030686.x.
- Ligtvoet, W.; Witte, F.; Goldschmidt, T.; Van Oijen, M.J.P.; Wanink, J.H.; Goudswaard, P.C. (1991). "Species Extinction and Concomitant Ecological Changes in Lake Victoria". Netherlands Journal of Zoology. 42 (2–3): 214–232. doi:10.1163/156854291X00298.
