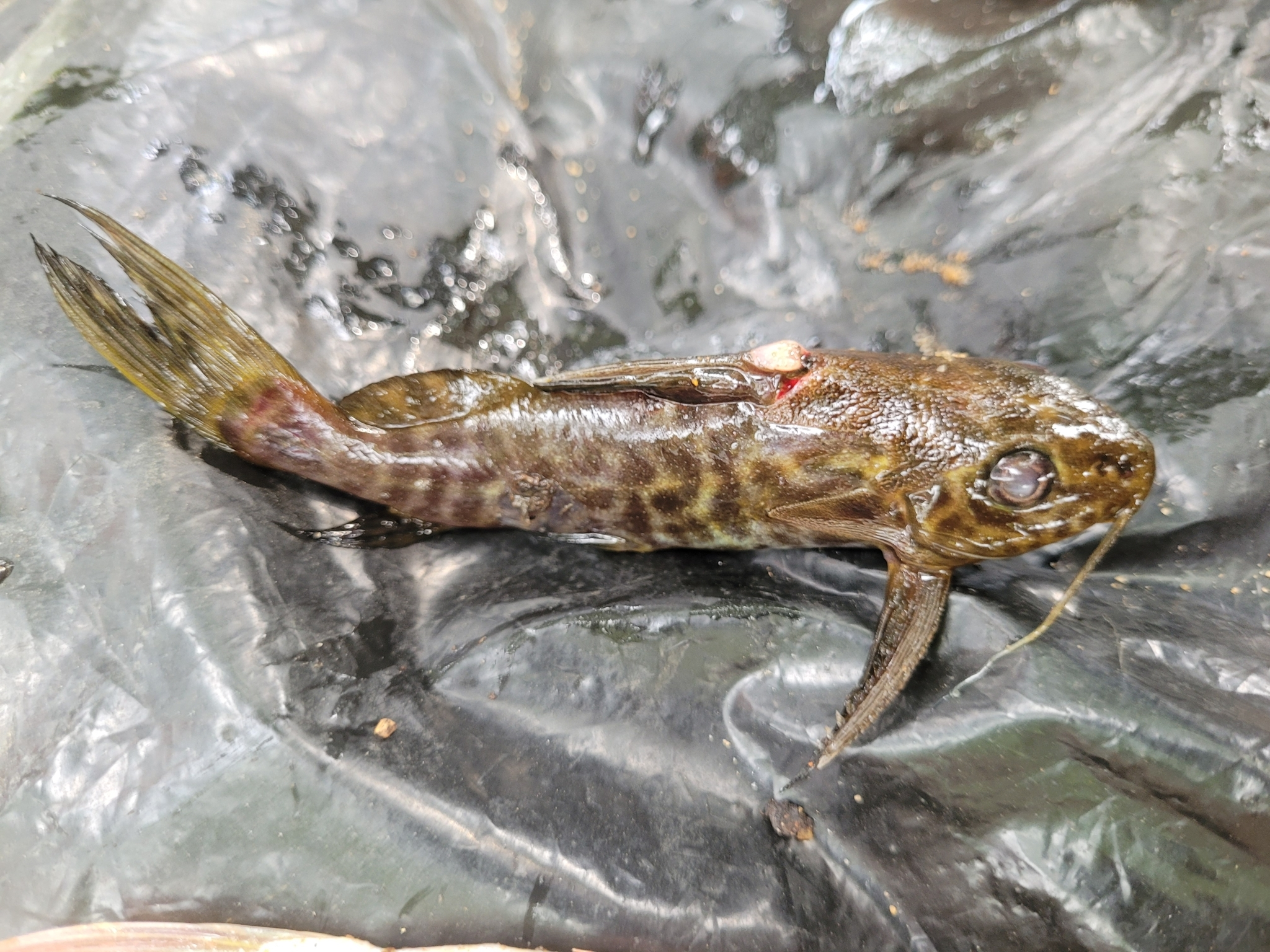

Conservation status
- Least Concern (IUCN 3.1)

Scientific classification
- Kingdom: Animalia
- Phylum: Chordata
- Class: Actinopterygii
- Order: Siluriformes
- Family: Mochokidae
- Genus: Synodontis
- Species: S. koensis

Binomial name
- Synodontis koensis Pellegrin, 1933

= Synodontis koensis =

Species of fish

Synodontis koensis is a species of upside-down catfish that is endemic to the Nzo River basin of Ivory Coast. This species grows to a length of 14.8 centimetres (5.8 in) total length. This species can be found in the aquarium trade.
