= Synodontis longispinis =

Conservation status
- Data Deficient (IUCN 3.1)

Scientific classification
- Kingdom: Animalia
- Phylum: Chordata
- Class: Actinopterygii
- Order: Siluriformes
- Family: Mochokidae
- Genus: Synodontis
- Species: S. longispinis

Binomial name
- Synodontis longispinis Pellegrin, 1930

Species of fish

Synodontis longispinis is a species of upside-down catfish that is endemic to the Republic of the Congo where it is found in the Sangha River. It was first described by Jacques Pellegrin in 1930 as Synodontis batesi longspinis, a subspecies of S. batesi with an especially long dorsal fin spine, but it is presently recognized as its own species. The species name longispinis is derived from the word longus, meaning long, and the word spinis, meaning spine, which is a reference to the long dorsal fin spine on the fish.

== Description ==
Like all members of the genus Synodontis, S. longispinis has a strong, bony head capsule that extends back as far as the first spine of the dorsal fin. The head contains a distinct narrow, bony, external protrusion called a humeral process. The fish has three pairs of barbels. The maxillary barbels are on located on the upper jaw, and two pairs of mandibular barbels are on the lower jaw. The adipose fin is large and the tail, or caudal fin, is forked.

The front edges of the dorsal fins and the pectoral fins are hardened into stiff spines. These spines can be raised into position at right angles to the body and locked into position for defensive purposes. The ability to lock the spines into place comes from several small bones attached to the spine, and once raised, the spines cannot be folded down by exerting pressure on the tip.

The fish has a structure called a premaxillary toothpad, which is located on the very front of the upper jaw of the mouth. This structure contains several rows of short, chisel-shaped teeth. On the lower jaw, or mandible, the teeth are attached to flexible, stalk-like structures and described as "s-shaped" or "hooked".

The maximum standard length of the species is 13.5 centimeters (5.3 in). Generally, females in the genus Synodontis tend to be slightly larger than males of the same age.

== Habitat and behavior ==
In the wild, the species is only known from its type locality in the Sangha River, but it may be more widespread than is currently known. The fish is harvested for human consumption. As a whole, species of Synodontis are omnivores, consuming insect larvae, algae, gastropods, bivalves, sponges, crustaceans, and the eggs of other fishes. The reproductive habits of most of the species of Synodontis are not known, beyond some instances of obtaining egg counts from gravid females. Spawning likely occurs during the flooding season between July and October, and pairs swim in unison during spawning. The growth rate is rapid in the first year, then slows down as the fish age.
