= Synodontis carineae =

Scientific classification
- Kingdom: Animalia
- Phylum: Chordata
- Class: Actinopterygii
- Order: Siluriformes
- Family: Mochokidae
- Genus: Synodontis
- Species: S. carineae

Binomial name
- Synodontis carineae Vreven & Ibala Zamba, 2011

Species of fish

Synodontis carineae is a species of upside-down catfish endemic to the Republic of the Congo, where it is only known from the Kouilou-Niari basin. This species grows to a length of 14.7 centimetres (5.8 in) SL.
