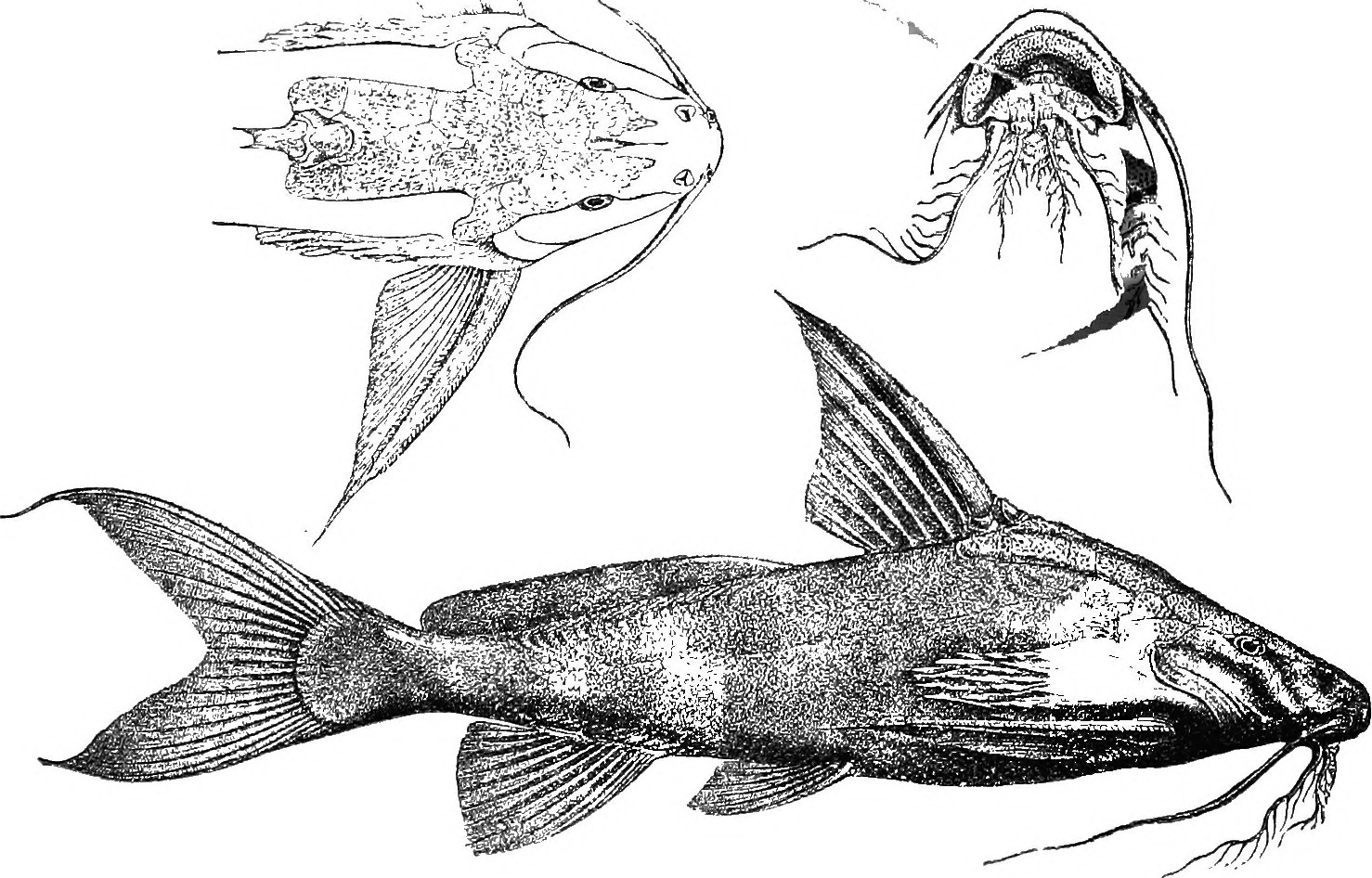

Conservation status
- Least Concern (IUCN 3.1)

Scientific classification
- Kingdom: Animalia
- Phylum: Chordata
- Class: Actinopterygii
- Order: Siluriformes
- Family: Mochokidae
- Genus: Synodontis
- Species: S. acanthomias

Binomial name
- Synodontis acanthomias Boulenger, 1899

= Synodontis acanthomias =

Species of fish

Synodontis acanthomias is a species of upside-down catfish native to the Congo Basin of Cameroon, the Central African Republic, the Democratic Republic of the Congo and the Republic of the Congo. It was originally discovered by George Albert Boulenger in 1899 in Boma, in the Democratic Republic of the Congo. The original specimen resides in the Natural History Museum in London. The species Synodontis pfefferi, described by Franz Steindachner in 1912 was found to be the same species. The specific name "acanthomias" means "very spiny", a reference to spines found on the side of the fish's body.

The fish has a greyish-brown body with black spots. One identifying characteristic of the species is its humeral process, which is a bony spike that is attached to a hardened head cap on the fish and can be seen extending beyond the gill opening. On adults, this contains spines which gives it a ragged appearance. The first ray of the dorsal fin and the pectoral fins are hardened and serrated. It has three pairs of barbels, the two mandibular pairs are branched. The caudal fin is deeply forked with an extension on the top lobe. It has short, cone-shaped teeth in the upper jaw. In the lower jaw, the teeth are s-shaped and movable. In the wild, the species grows to a length of 59 centimetres (23 in) TL. They inhabit waters with temperature ranges between 22 and 24 °C (72 and 75 °F) and a pH range of 6.5 to 8.0.

The fish has some commercial importance and is harvested for human consumption.
