= Synodontis ngouniensis =

Scientific classification
- Kingdom: Animalia
- Phylum: Chordata
- Class: Actinopterygii
- Order: Siluriformes
- Family: Mochokidae
- Genus: Synodontis
- Species: S. ngouniensis

Binomial name
- Synodontis ngouniensis De Weirdt, Vreven & Fermon, 2008

Species of fish

Synodontis ngouniensis is a species of upside-down catfish native to the Republic of the Congo and Gabon, where it occurs in the Ngounié and upper Nyanga river basins. This species grows to a length of 19 centimetres (7.5 in) SL.
