= Synodontis kogonensis =

Conservation status
- Vulnerable (IUCN 3.1)

Scientific classification
- Domain: Eukaryota
- Kingdom: Animalia
- Phylum: Chordata
- Class: Actinopterygii
- Order: Siluriformes
- Family: Mochokidae
- Genus: Synodontis
- Species: S. kogonensis

Binomial name
- Synodontis kogonensis Musschoot & Lalèyè, 2008

Species of fish

Synodontis kogonensis is a species of upside-down catfish endemic to Guinea, where it occurs in the Kogon and Fatala rivers. This species grows to a length of 21.2 centimetres (8.3 in) SL.
