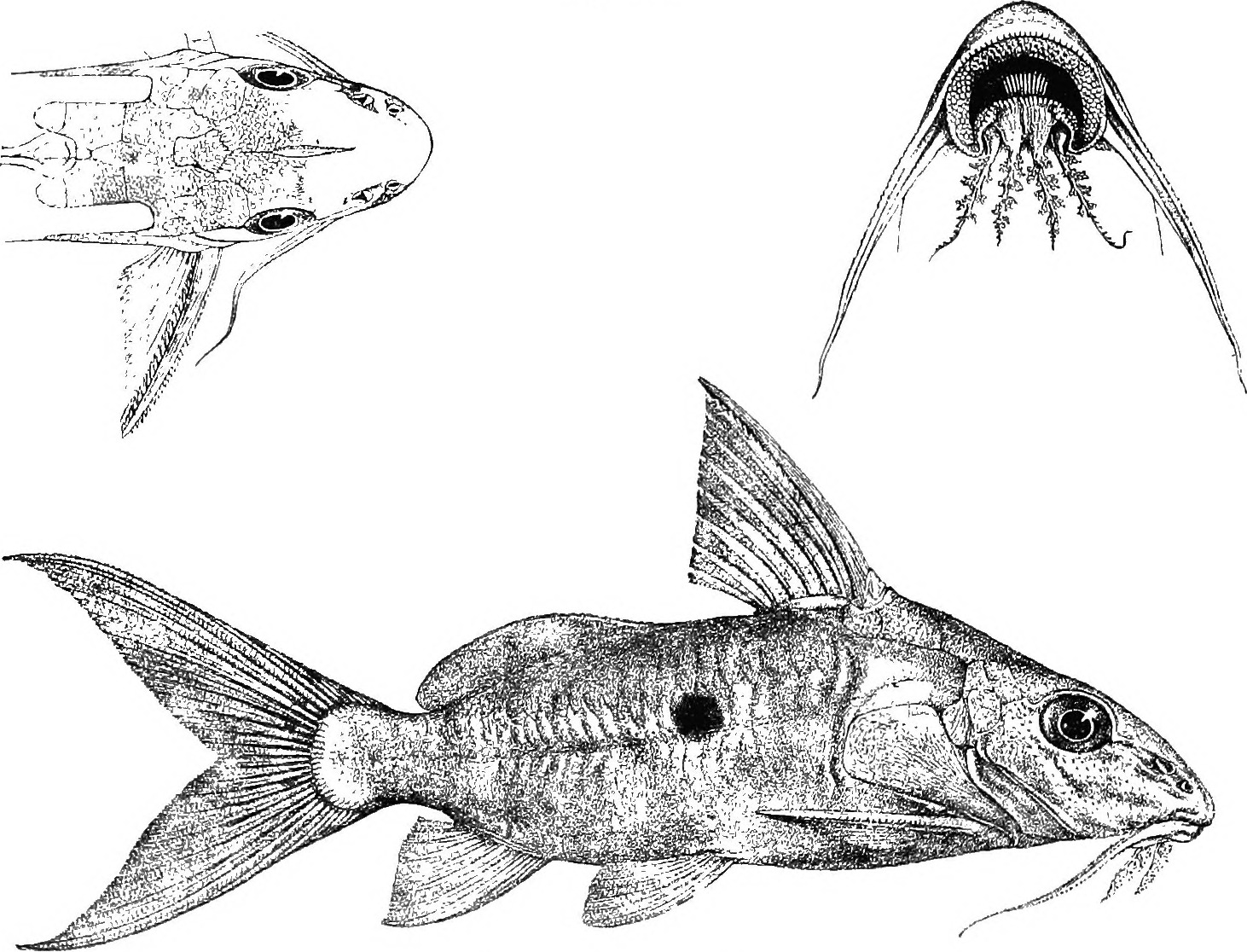

Conservation status
- Least Concern (IUCN 3.1)

Scientific classification
- Kingdom: Animalia
- Phylum: Chordata
- Class: Actinopterygii
- Order: Siluriformes
- Family: Mochokidae
- Genus: Synodontis
- Species: S. nummifer

Binomial name
- Synodontis nummifer Boulenger, 1899

= Synodontis nummifer =

Species of fish

Synodontis nummifer, known as the two spot synodontis, is a species of upside-down catfish native to the Congo Basin of Cameroon, the Democratic Republic of the Congo and the Republic of the Congo. It was first described by the Belgian-British zoologist George Albert Boulenger in 1899, based upon a holotype discovered in Léopoldville, Belgian Congo. The specific name "nummifer" comes from the Latin for "to bear a coin", which refers to the large spots on its sides.

== Description ==
The body of the fish is olive colored on the back transitioning to whitish on the underside. The sides of the fish have a large round black spot on each side, above the lateral line, and frequently a second spot above the base of the anal fin. The pigmentation of the head is spotted.

Like other members of the genus, this fish has a humeral process, which is a bony spike that is attached to a hardened head cap on the fish and can be seen extending beyond the gill opening. This process is broad and rounded at the end, and extends as far as the occipito-nuchal process. The first ray of the dorsal fin and the pectoral fins have a hardened first ray which is serrated, as long or a little longer than the head. The caudal fin is very deeply forked. It has short, cone-shaped teeth in the upper jaw. In the lower jaw, the teeth are s-shaped and movable. The fish has one pair of maxillary barbels, with broad membranes at the base, as long as the head or slightly shorter, and two pairs of mandibular barbels that are often branched. The adipose fin is about four times as long as it is deep. The pectoral spine is a little shorter than the head, and strongly serrated on both sides.

This species grows to a length of 17.5 centimetres (6.9 in) SL although specimens up to 20.5 centimetres (8.1 in) TL have been recorded in the wild.

== Habitat ==
In the wild, the species inhabits tropical waters with a temperature range of 22 to 25 °C (72 to 77 °F), a pH of 6.4 – 7.2, and dH range of up to 18. It has been found throughout the Congo River basin, but not the southern tributaries of the Congo River.

== Parasites ==
As other fish, Synodontis nummifer harbours parasites, including species of the monogenean genus Synodontella.
