= Synodontis voltae =

Scientific classification
- Domain: Eukaryota
- Kingdom: Animalia
- Phylum: Chordata
- Class: Actinopterygii
- Order: Siluriformes
- Family: Mochokidae
- Genus: Synodontis
- Species: S. voltae

Binomial name
- Synodontis voltae Román, 1975

Species of fish

Synodontis voltae is a species of upside-down catfish endemic to Burkina Faso where it is found in the Bougouriba River. This species grows to a length of 14.7 centimetres (5.8 in) TL.
