= Synodontis laessoei =

Conservation status
- Data Deficient (IUCN 3.1)

Scientific classification
- Domain: Eukaryota
- Kingdom: Animalia
- Phylum: Chordata
- Class: Actinopterygii
- Order: Siluriformes
- Family: Mochokidae
- Genus: Synodontis
- Species: S. laessoei

Binomial name
- Synodontis laessoei Norman, 1923

Species of fish

Synodontis laessoei is a species of upside-down catfish endemic to Angola where it is only known from the Kokema River. This species grows to a length of 14.8 centimetres (5.8 in) TL.
