= Synodontis annectens =

Conservation status
- Least Concern (IUCN 3.1)

Scientific classification
- Domain: Eukaryota
- Kingdom: Animalia
- Phylum: Chordata
- Class: Actinopterygii
- Order: Siluriformes
- Family: Mochokidae
- Genus: Synodontis
- Species: S. annectens

Binomial name
- Synodontis annectens Boulenger, 1911

Species of fish

Synodontis annectens is a species of upside-down catfish native to the freshwater rivers of Gambia, Guinea, Guinea-Bissau and Sierra Leone. This species grows to a length of 32.3 centimetres (12.7 in) TL.
