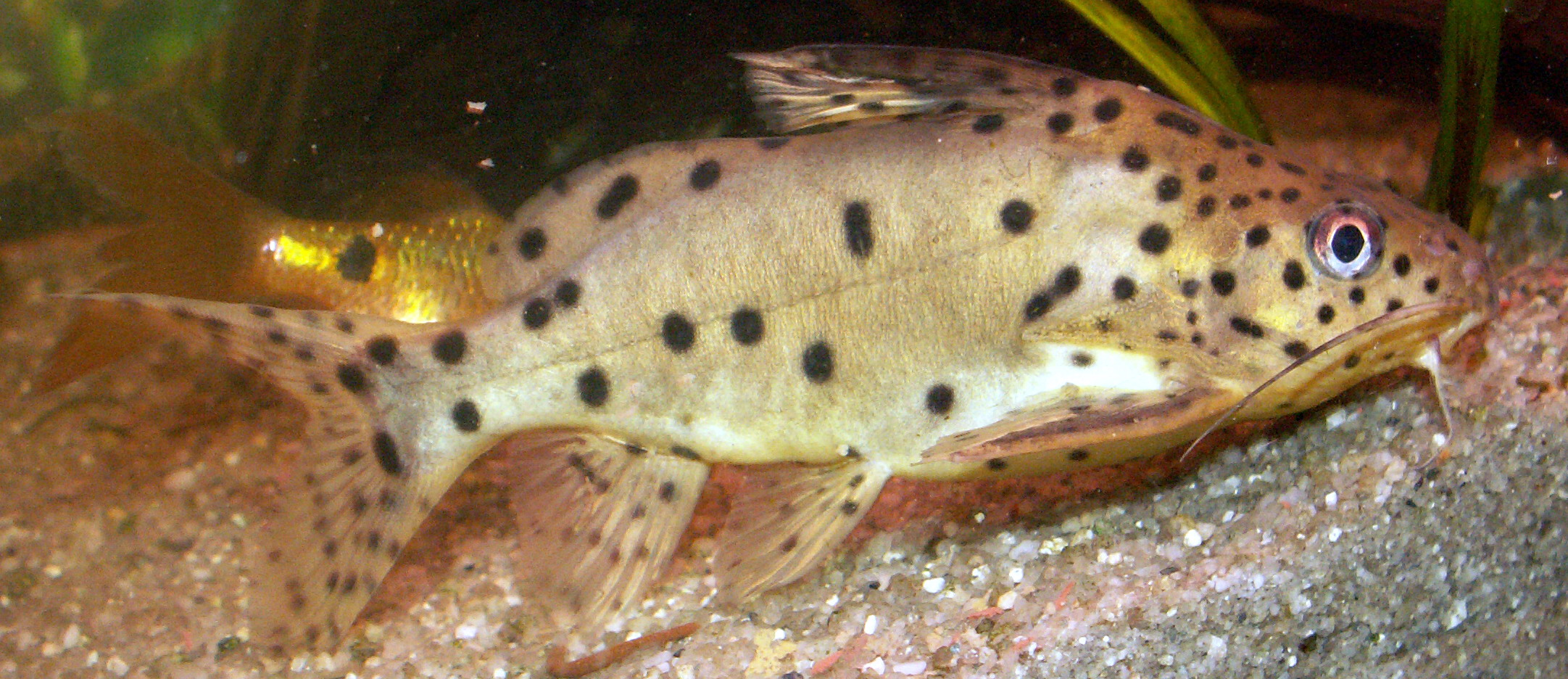
- Synodontis njassae

Scientific classification
- Kingdom: Animalia
- Phylum: Chordata
- Class: Actinopterygii
- Division: Teleostei
- Order: Siluriformes
- Family: Mochokidae
- Genus: Synodontis; G. Cuvier, 1816

Type species
- Silurus clarias Linnaeus, 1758

Synonyms
- Leiosynodontis Bleeker, 1862; Pseudosynodontis Bleeker, 1862

= Synodontis =

Synodontis Temporal range: Early Miocene–Recent

Genus of fishes

Synodontis is the largest genus of mochokid catfishes. It is the biggest genus within the 10 genera and 190 different species in the family Mochokidae. Synodontis has over 131 different species within the genus. Synodontis are also known as squeakers, due to their ability to make stridulatory sounds through their pectoral fin spines when handled or disturbed. Synodontis make a sound that sounds like squeaking by rubbing their spines together. They do this when they have been frightened or when they become angry. Synodontis may also squeak when they are taken out of the water. These catfish are small- to medium-sized fish with many species exhibiting attractive spotted markings. Some species are also known for naturally swimming belly-up, earning the name upside-down catfish. Some of these species are Synodontis contractus and Synodontis nigriventris. While some Synodontis are known to swim upside down, another species, Synodontis multipunctatus, is a brood parasite. This species, Synodontis petricola, and Synodontis grandiops are collectively known as cuckoo catfish.

== Distribution ==
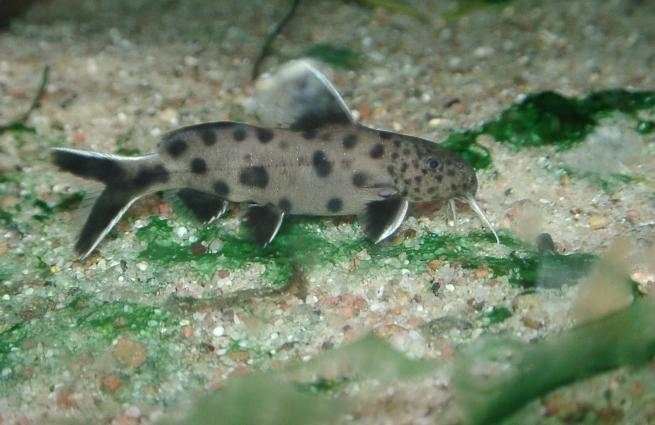
Synodontis petricola

Synodontis is a freshwater catfish that is most commonly found throughout Africa, occurring mostly in Central and West Africa. Synodontis is the most widely distributed mochokidae genus, occurring throughout most of the freshwaters of sub-Saharan Africa and the Nile River system. They can live in freshwaters which can be creeks, ponds, streams, lakes, and rivers. Their distribution is similar to that of cichlid fishes, however, unlike cichlids the majority of their diversity occurs in rivers not lakes.

== Evolutionary history ==
Synodontis catfish form a small endemic radiation in Lake Tanganyika, which includes the non-endemic species S. victoriae. This radiation is thought to have evolved relatively recently (~5.5. Million years ago), having diversified within full lacustrine conditions. This is also the case for other endemic Lake Tanganyika lineages such as mastacembelid eels and platythelphusid crabs for example. Lake Tanganyikan Synodontis have also been shown to be Müllerian mimics, and that at least one species (Synodontis multipunctatus) is a brood parasite.

== Fossil record ==
The earliest fossils of Synodontis in East African are from the Early Miocene. Many Synodontis fossils are the spines because they are very sturdy and so they are preserved better. The fossils of spines that are found are used to determine the family or genera of the fish but it cannot determine the species. Synodontis species that have survived and are still living can be identified by the shape of their whisker like organs on their heads called barbels, which relate to touch. The can also be identified by the color of their skin, the skull bones, and the number and length of the teeth.

== Ecology ==
Synodontis species are omnivorous generalists, feeding on a wide spectrum of different foods and are largely unspecialized. Insects, crustaceans, mollusks, annelids, seeds, and algae have been found in the stomachs of different species of Synodontis. They are bottom-feeders and may be detritivores, some species may also be able to adapt to filter feeding. This allows them to cope with seasonal and habitat changes and gives them a better ability to colonize different habitats. Different Synodontis species have somewhat different growth rates but most of them are fairly similar. Females of a species are generally larger than the males. There is a great increase in growth the first year in both male and female and then the growth slows down as they become older. The form and structure of these fish are very different compared to other fish. The size and shape of the mouth are distinct because of its ventral mouth and these fish usually are triangular or cylindrical when looking at it from the side. Not much is known about the reproduction in these fish. It has been determined that July to October is when they spawn and that they swim in pairs during this spawning time. Species of Synodontis have been noted to reproduce with the flooding period of the rainy season.

== Relationship to humans ==
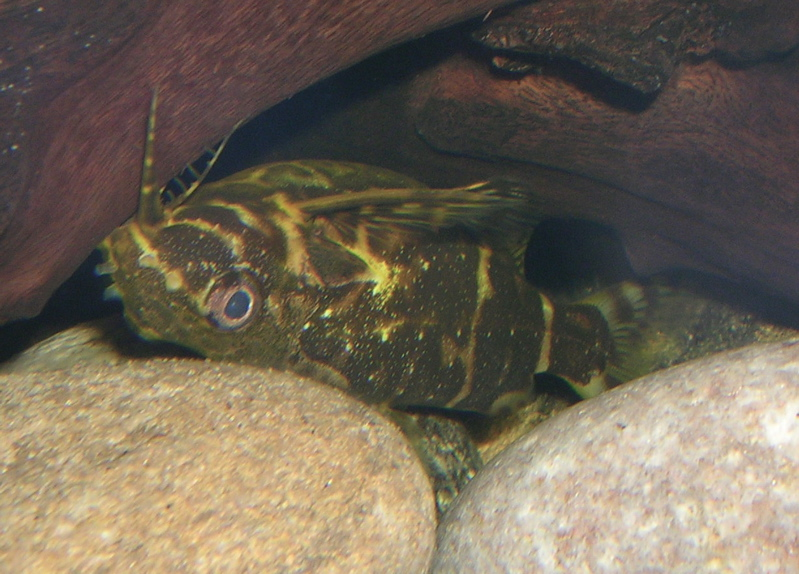
Synodontis nigriventris is a popular aquarium fish.

Many Synodontis species are prized ornamental fish in the fishkeeping hobby. While species of Synodontis are prized for their color or behavior, others are wanted for food. Some of the bigger species in the genus are important food sources for the people in Africa.

== Species ==
There are currently 131 recognized species in this genus: Synodontis accounts for about one-quarter of African catfish species. This genus has more members than any other African teleost genus other than Barbus and Haplochromis.

Newer species are listed with references.

- Synodontis acanthomias Boulenger, 1899
- Synodontis acanthoperca Friel & Vigliotta, 2006
- Synodontis afrofischeri Hilgendorf, 1888 (Fischer's Victoria squeaker)
- Synodontis alberti Schilthuis, 1891 (Bigeye squeaker)
- Synodontis albolineatus Pellegrin, 1924
- Synodontis angelicus Schilthuis, 1891 (Angel squeaker)
- Synodontis annectens Boulenger, 1911
- Synodontis ansorgii Boulenger, 1911
- Synodontis arnoulti Román, 1966
- Synodontis aterrimus Poll & Roberts, 1968
- Synodontis bastiani Daget, 1948
- Synodontis batensoda Rüppell, 1832 (Upsidedown catfish)
- Synodontis batesii Boulenger, 1907
- Synodontis brichardi Poll, 1959
- Synodontis budgetti Boulenger, 1911
- Synodontis camelopardalis Poll, 1971
- Synodontis carineae Vreven & Ibala Zamba, 2011
- Synodontis caudalis Boulenger, 1899
- Synodontis caudovittatus Boulenger, 1901
- Synodontis centralis Poll, 1971
- Synodontis clarias (Linnaeus, 1758) (Mandi)
- Synodontis comoensis Daget & Lévêque, 1981
- Synodontis congicus Poll, 1971
- Synodontis contractus Vinciguerra, 1928 (Bugeye squeaker)
- Synodontis courteti Pellegrin, 1906
- Synodontis cuangoanus Poll, 1971
- Synodontis decorus Boulenger, 1899 (Clown squeaker)
- Synodontis dekimpei Paugy, 1987
- Synodontis depauwi Boulenger, 1899
- Synodontis dhonti Boulenger, 1917
- Synodontis dorsomaculatus Poll, 1971
- Synodontis eupterus Boulenger, 1901 (Featherfin squeaker)
- Synodontis filamentosus Boulenger, 1901
- Synodontis flavitaeniatus Boulenger, 1919 (Orangestriped squeaker)
- Synodontis frontosus Vaillant, 1895
- Synodontis fuelleborni Hilgendorf & Pappenheim, 1903 (Fuelleborn's squeaker)
- Synodontis geledensis Günther, 1896 (Geledi squeaker)
- Synodontis gobroni Daget, 1954
- Synodontis grandiops Wright & Page, 2006
- Synodontis granulosus Boulenger, 1900
- Synodontis greshoffi Schilthuis, 1891
- Synodontis guttatus Günther, 1865
- Synodontis haugi Pellegrin, 1906
- Synodontis ilebrevis Wright & Page, 2006
- Synodontis irsacae Matthes, 1959
- Synodontis iturii Steindachner, 1911
- Synodontis katangae Poll, 1971
- Synodontis khartoumensis Abu Gideiri, 1967
- Synodontis koensis Pellegrin, 1933
- Synodontis kogonensis Musschoot & Lalèyè, 2008
- Synodontis laessoei Norman, 1923
- Synodontis leopardinus Pellegrin, 1914 (Leopard squeaker)
- Synodontis leopardus Pfeffer, 1896
- Synodontis levequei Paugy, 1987
- Synodontis longirostris Boulenger, 1902
- Synodontis longispinis Pellegrin, 1930
- Synodontis lucipinnis Wright & Page, 2006
- Synodontis lufirae Poll, 1971
- Synodontis macrophthalmus Poll, 1971
- Synodontis macrops Greenwood, 1963
- Synodontis macropunctatus Wright & Page, 2008
- Synodontis macrostigma Boulenger, 1911 (Largespot squeaker)
- Synodontis macrostoma Skelton & White, 1990 (Largemouth squeaker)
- Synodontis manni De Vos, 2001 (Feather-barbelled squeaker)
- Synodontis marmoratus Lönnberg, 1895
- Synodontis matthesi Poll, 1971
- Synodontis melanopterus Boulenger, 1903
- Synodontis melanostictus Boulenger, 1906
- Synodontis membranacea (Geoffroy Saint-Hilaire, 1809)
- Synodontis multimaculatus Boulenger, 1902
- Synodontis multipunctatus Boulenger, 1898 (Cuckoo catfish)
- Synodontis nebulosus Peters, 1852 (Cloudy squeaker)
- Synodontis ngouniensis De Weirdt, Vreven & Fermon, 2008
- Synodontis nigrita Valenciennes, 1840
- Synodontis nigriventris David, 1936 (Blotched upsidedown catfish)
- Synodontis nigromaculatus Boulenger, 1905 (Blackspotted squeaker)
- Synodontis njassae Keilhack, 1908 (Malawi squeaker)
- Synodontis notatus Vaillant, 1893 (Onespot squeaker)
- Synodontis nummifer Boulenger, 1899
- Synodontis obesus Boulenger, 1898
- Synodontis ocellifer Boulenger, 1900
- Synodontis omias Günther, 1864
- Synodontis orientalis Seegers, 2008
- Synodontis ornatipinnis Boulenger, 1899
- Synodontis ornatissimus Gosse, 1982
- Synodontis ouemeensis Musschoot & Lalèyè, 2008
- Synodontis pardalis Boulenger, 1908
- Synodontis petricola Matthes, 1959 (Cuckoo Catfish)
- Synodontis pleurops Boulenger, 1897 (Congo squeaker)
- Synodontis polli Gosse, 1982
- Synodontis polyodon Vaillant, 1895
- Synodontis polystigma Boulenger, 1915
- Synodontis pulcher Poll, 1971
- Synodontis punctifer Daget, 1965
- Synodontis punctulatus Günther, 1889
- Synodontis punu Vreven & Milondo, 2009
- Synodontis rebeli Holly, 1926
- Synodontis resupinatus Boulenger, 1904
- Synodontis ricardoae Seegers, 1996 (Ricardo's squeaker)
- Synodontis robbianus Smith, 1875
- Synodontis robertsi Poll, 1974
- Synodontis ruandae Matthes, 1959
- Synodontis rufigiensis Bailey, 1968
- Synodontis rukwaensis Hilgendorf & Pappenheim, 1903 (Lake Rukwa squeaker)
- Synodontis schall (Bloch & Schneider, 1801) (Wahrindi)
- Synodontis schoutedeni David, 1936
- Synodontis serpentis Whitehead, 1962 (Tana squeaker)
- Synodontis serratus Rüppell, 1829
- Synodontis smiti Boulenger, 1902
- Synodontis soloni Boulenger, 1899
- Synodontis sorex Günther, 1864
- Synodontis steindachneri Boulenger, 1913
- Synodontis tanganyicae Borodin, 1936
- Synodontis tessmanni Pappenheim, 1911
- Synodontis thamalakanensis Fowler, 1935
- Synodontis thysi Poll, 1971
- Synodontis tourei Daget, 1962
- Synodontis unicolor Boulenger, 1915
- Synodontis vaillanti Boulenger, 1897
- Synodontis vanderwaali Skelton & White, 1990
- Synodontis velifer Norman, 1935
- Synodontis vermiculatus Daget, 1954
- Synodontis victoriae Boulenger, 1906 (Lake Victoria squeaker)
- Synodontis violaceus Pellegrin, 1919
- Synodontis voltae Román, 1975
- Synodontis waterloti Daget, 1962
- Synodontis woleuensis Friel & Sullivan, 2008
- Synodontis woosnami Boulenger, 1911 (Upper Zambezi squeaker)
- Synodontis xiphias Günther, 1864
- Synodontis zambezensis Peters, 1852 (Plain squeaker)
- Synodontis zanzibaricus Peters, 1868 (Eastcoast squeaker)
