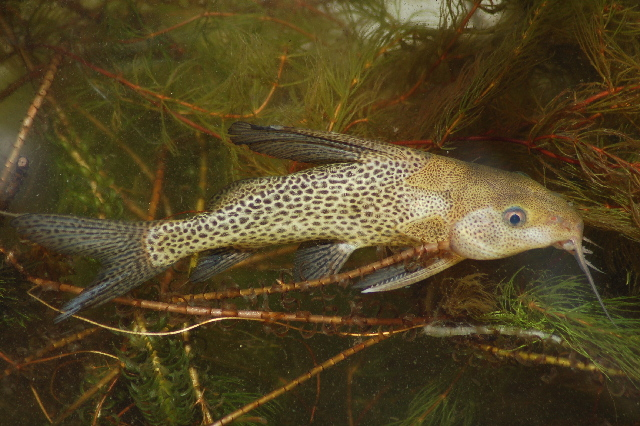

Conservation status
- Least Concern (IUCN 3.1)

Scientific classification
- Kingdom: Animalia
- Phylum: Chordata
- Class: Actinopterygii
- Order: Siluriformes
- Family: Mochokidae
- Genus: Synodontis
- Species: S. woosnami

Binomial name
- Synodontis woosnami Boulenger, 1911

= Synodontis woosnami =

Species of fish

Synodontis woosnami, known as the Upper Zambezi squeaker, or bubblebarb squeaker, is a species of upside-down catfish that is native to Angola, Botswana, Namibia, Zambia and Zimbabwe where it is found in the upper Zambezi and Okavango River basins and the Cunene River. It was first described by British-Belgian zoologist George Albert Boulenger in 1911, from a specimen collected in the Okavango River in the Lake Ngami district of Botswana. The species name woosnami is derived from R. B. Woosnam, the collector of the first specimen.

== Description ==
Like all members of the genus Synodontis, S. woosnami has a strong, bony head capsule that extends back as far as the first spine of the dorsal fin. The head contains a distinct narrow, bony, external protrusion called a humeral process. The shape and size of the humeral process helps to identify the species. In S. woosnami, the humeral process is slightly longer than it is broad, without a distinct point on the end.

The fish has three pairs of barbels. The maxillary barbels are on located on the upper jaw, and two pairs of mandibular barbels are on the lower jaw. The maxillary barbel is long and straight without any branches, without a membrane at the base. It extends about 4/5 of the length of the head. The mandibular barbels have long, slender branches, and the outer pair is about 1 1/2 as long as the inner pair.

The front edges of the dorsal fins and the pectoral fins of Syntontis species are hardened into stiff spines. In S. woosnami, the spine of the dorsal fin is about 5/6 the length of the head, slightly curved, smooth in the front and serrated on the back. The remaining portion of the dorsal fin is made up of seven branching rays. The spine of the pectoral fin is as long as the dorsal spine, and serrated on both sides. The adipose fin is 3 1/2 times as long as it is deep. The anal fin contains four unbranched and 8 branched rays, and has a rounded appearance. The tail, or caudal fin, is deeply forked.

All members of Syndontis have a structure called a premaxillary toothpad, which is located on the very front of the upper jaw of the mouth. This structure contains several rows of short, chisel-shaped teeth. In S. woosnami, the toothpad forms a short and broad band. On the lower jaw, or mandible, the teeth of Syndontis are attached to flexible, stalk-like structures and described as "s-shaped" or "hooked". The number of teeth on the mandible is used to differentiate between species; in S. woosnami, there are about 20 teeth on the mandible.

The base body color is dark brown on the back, lighter on the underside. The back, sides, and fins are covered with black dots.

The maximum standard length of the species is 20.5 centimetres (8.1 in). Generally, females in the genus Synodontis tend to be slightly larger than males of the same age.

== Habitat and behavior ==
In the wild, the species has been found in the upper Zambezi River basin, as well as the Okavango River basin and Cunene River basin. The reproductive habits of most of the species of Synodontis are not known, beyond some instances of obtaining egg counts from gravid females. Spawning likely occurs during the flooding season between July and October, and pairs swim in unison during spawning. As a whole, species of Synodontis are omnivores, consuming insect larvae, algae, gastropods, bivalves, sponges, crustaceans, and the eggs of other fishes. The growth rate is rapid in the first year, then slows down as the fish age.
