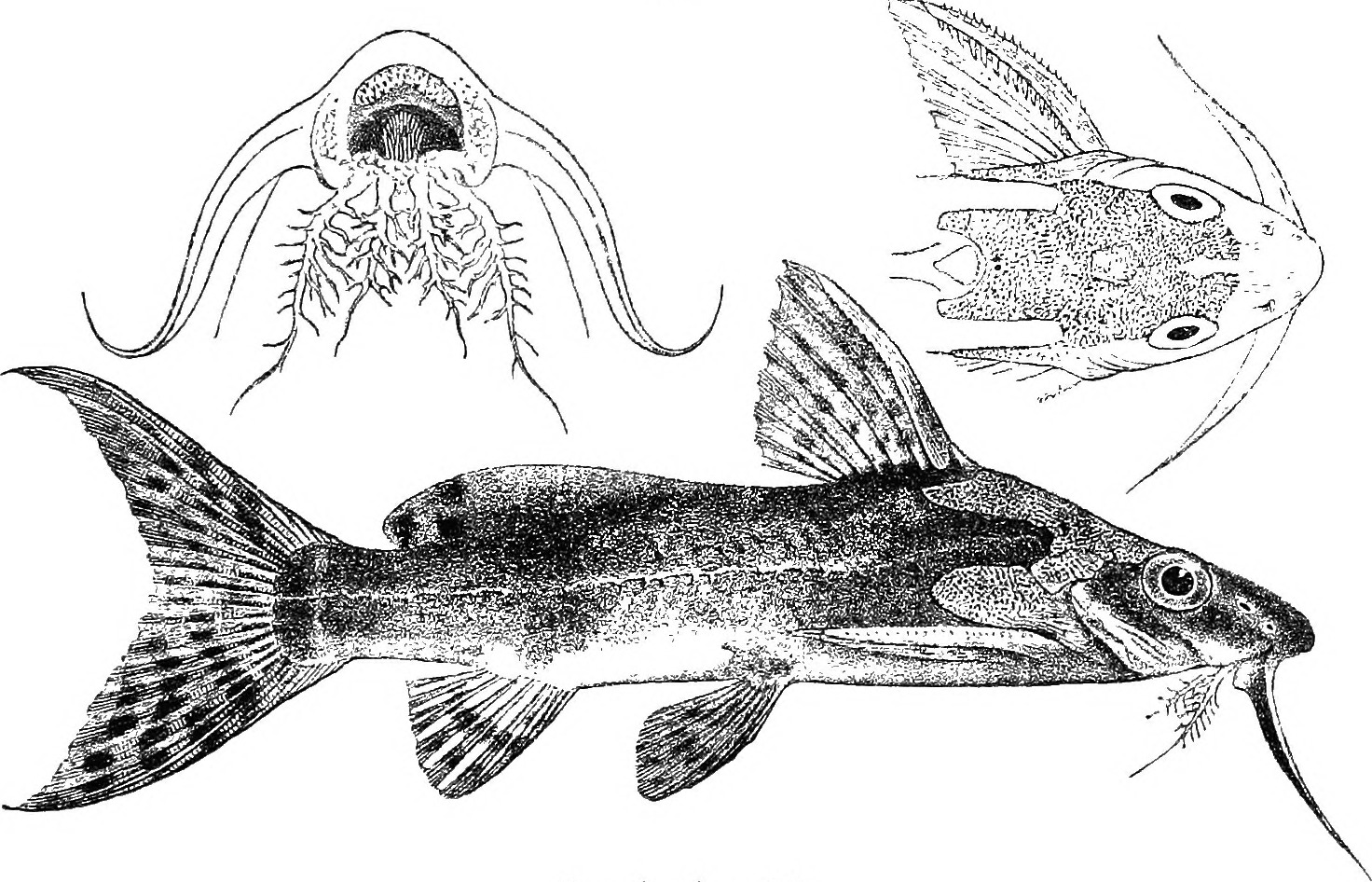

Conservation status
- Least Concern (IUCN 3.1)

Scientific classification
- Kingdom: Animalia
- Phylum: Chordata
- Class: Actinopterygii
- Order: Siluriformes
- Family: Mochokidae
- Genus: Synodontis
- Species: S. smiti

Binomial name
- Synodontis smiti Boulenger, 1902

= Synodontis smiti =

Species of fish

Synodontis smiti, known as the longtail Synodontis, or Smit's Synodontis, is a species of upside-down catfish that is endemic to the Democratic Republic of the Congo where it is found in the middle and upper Congo Basin. It was first described by British-Belgian zoologist George Albert Boulenger in 1902, from specimens obtained in the Ubangi River at Banzyville. The species name smiti is named for Pierre Jacques Smit, who illustrated the plates in Boulenger's works.

== Description ==
Like all members of the genus Synodontis, S. smiti has a strong, bony head capsule that extends back as far as the first spine of the dorsal fin. The head contains a distinct narrow, bony, external protrusion called a humeral process. The shape and size of the humeral process helps to identify the species. In S. smiti, the humeral process is rough and rounded or obtusely pointed at the end.

The fish has three pairs of barbels. The maxillary barbels are on located on the upper jaw, and two pairs of mandibular barbels are on the lower jaw. The maxillary barbel is straight without any branches, with a broad membrane at the base. It extends a little shorter than the length of the head. The outer pair of mandibular barbels is about 2/5 to 1/2 as long as the head, and the inner pair is 1/3 as long as the head., both with long, slender branches with secondary branches.

The front edges of the dorsal fins and the pectoral fins of Syntontis species are hardened into stiff spines. In S. smiti, the spine is a little shorter than the head, slightly curved, smooth in the front and serrated on the back. The remaining portion of the dorsal fin is made up of seven branching rays. The spine of the pectoral fin is as long as the head, and serrated on both sides. The adipose fin is 4 to 5 times as long as it is deep. The anal fin contains four unbranched and six to seven branched rays. The tail, or caudal fin, is deeply notched.

All members of Syndontis have a structure called a premaxillary toothpad, which is located on the very front of the upper jaw of the mouth. This structure contains several rows of short, chisel-shaped teeth. In S. smiti, the toothpad forms a short, broad band. On the lower jaw, or mandible, the teeth of Syndontis are attached to flexible, stalk-like structures and described as "s-shaped" or "hooked". The number of teeth on the mandible is used to differentiate between species; in S. smiti, there are about 16 or 17 teeth on the mandible.

The color of the fish is brown, with indistinct darker spots and marblings. Round dark spots appear on the rayed fins and may appear as bands.

The maximum total length of the species is 22.2 centimetres (8.7 in). Generally, females in the genus Synodontis tend to be slightly larger than males of the same age.

== Habitat and behavior ==
In the wild, the species known from the central and upper Congo Basin. The species is harvested for human consumption. The reproductive habits of most of the species of Synodontis are not known, beyond some instances of obtaining egg counts from gravid females. Spawning likely occurs during the flooding season between July and October, and pairs swim in unison during spawning. The growth rate is rapid in the first year, then slows down as the fish age.
