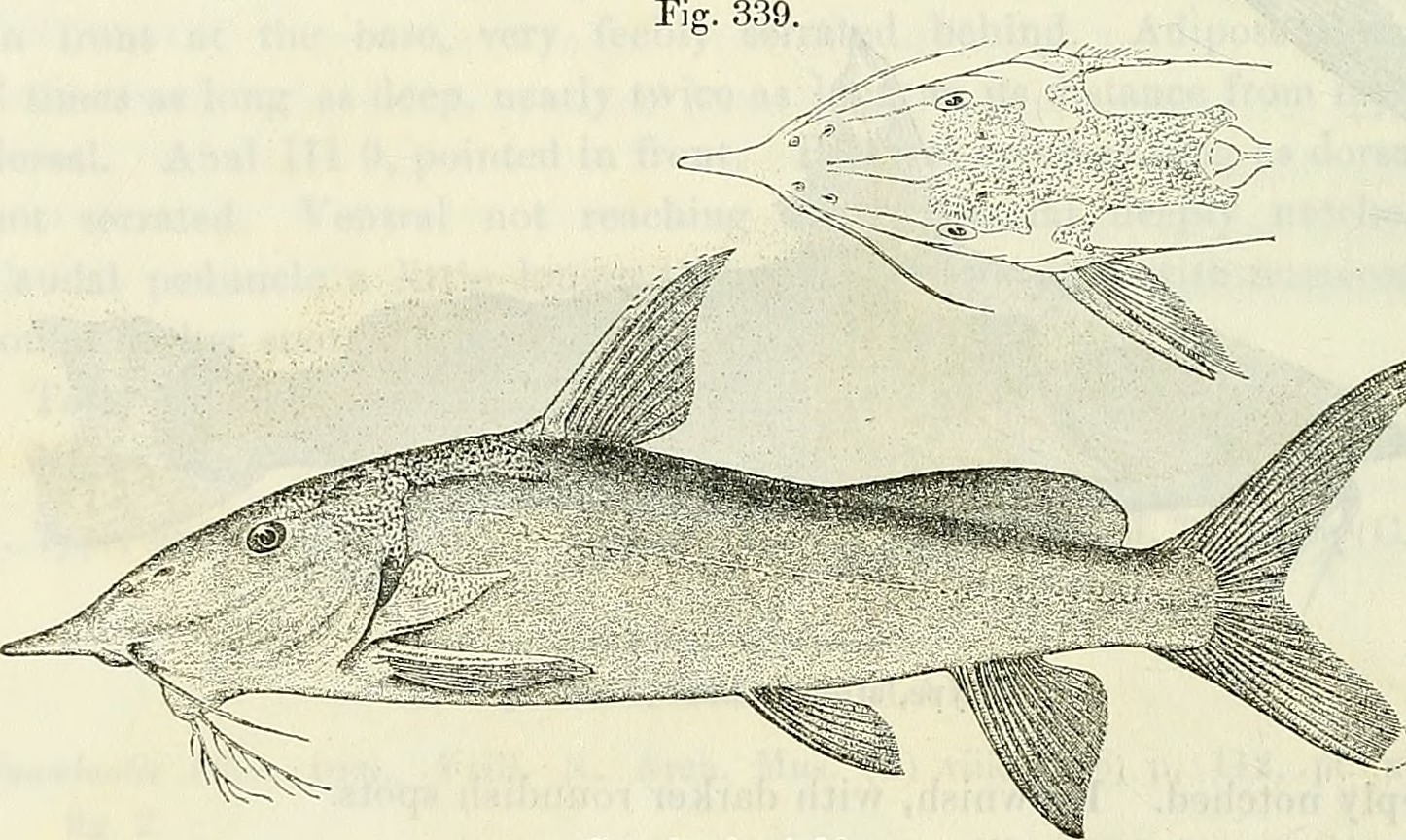

Conservation status
- Critically Endangered (IUCN 3.1)

Scientific classification
- Kingdom: Animalia
- Phylum: Chordata
- Class: Actinopterygii
- Order: Siluriformes
- Family: Mochokidae
- Genus: Synodontis
- Species: S. xiphias

Binomial name
- Synodontis xiphias Günther, 1864

= Synodontis xiphias =

Species of fish

Synodontis xiphias is a species of upside-down catfish that is native to the Niger River basin of Nigeria. It was first described by German ichthyologist Albert Günther in 1864, from specimens obtained in the Niger River. The species name xiphias comes from the Greek word xiphos, meaning sword, which refers to the long snout that was observed on the stuffed type specimen.

== Description ==
Like all members of the genus Synodontis, S. xiphias has a strong, bony head capsule that extends back as far as the first spine of the dorsal fin. The head contains a distinct narrow, bony, external protrusion called a humeral process. The shape and size of the humeral process helps to identify the species. In S. xiphias, the humeral process is rough, much longer than it is broad, and pointed at the end.

The fish has three pairs of barbels. The maxillary barbels are on located on the upper jaw, and two pairs of mandibular barbels are on the lower jaw. The maxillary barbel is straight without any branches, without a membrane at the base. It extends about 1/2 as long as the head. The mandibular barbels have long, slender branches.

The front edges of the dorsal fins and the pectoral fins of Syntontis species are hardened into stiff spines. In S. xiphias, the spine is smooth in the front and serrated on the back. The remaining portion of the dorsal fin is made up of seven branching rays. The spine of the pectoral fin is 1/2 the length of the head and serrated on both sides. The adipose fin is 4 1/2 times as long as it is deep. The anal fin contains four unbranched and eight branched rays, and is pointed in the front. The tail, or caudal fin, is deeply notched.

All members of Syndontis have a structure called a premaxillary toothpad, which is located on the very front of the upper jaw of the mouth. This structure contains several rows of short, chisel-shaped teeth. In S. xiphias, the toothpad forms a short, broad band. On the lower jaw, or mandible, the teeth of Syndontis are attached to flexible, stalk-like structures and described as "s-shaped" or "hooked". The number of teeth on the mandible is used to differentiate between species; in S. xiphias, there are about 8 teeth on the mandible.

The color of the fish is a uniform brown, with small, rounded spots on the sides and adipose fin.

The maximum total length of the species is 67.5 centimetres (26.6 in). Generally, females in the genus Synodontis tend to be slightly larger than males of the same age.

== Habitat and behavior ==
In the wild, the species is known only from the lower Niger River. The species is harvested for human consumption. The species is threatened from habitat loss caused by oil exploration in the Niger delta. The reproductive habits of most of the species of Synodontis are not known, beyond some instances of obtaining egg counts from gravid females. Spawning likely occurs during the flooding season between July and October, and pairs swim in unison during spawning. The growth rate is rapid in the first year, then slows down as the fish age.
