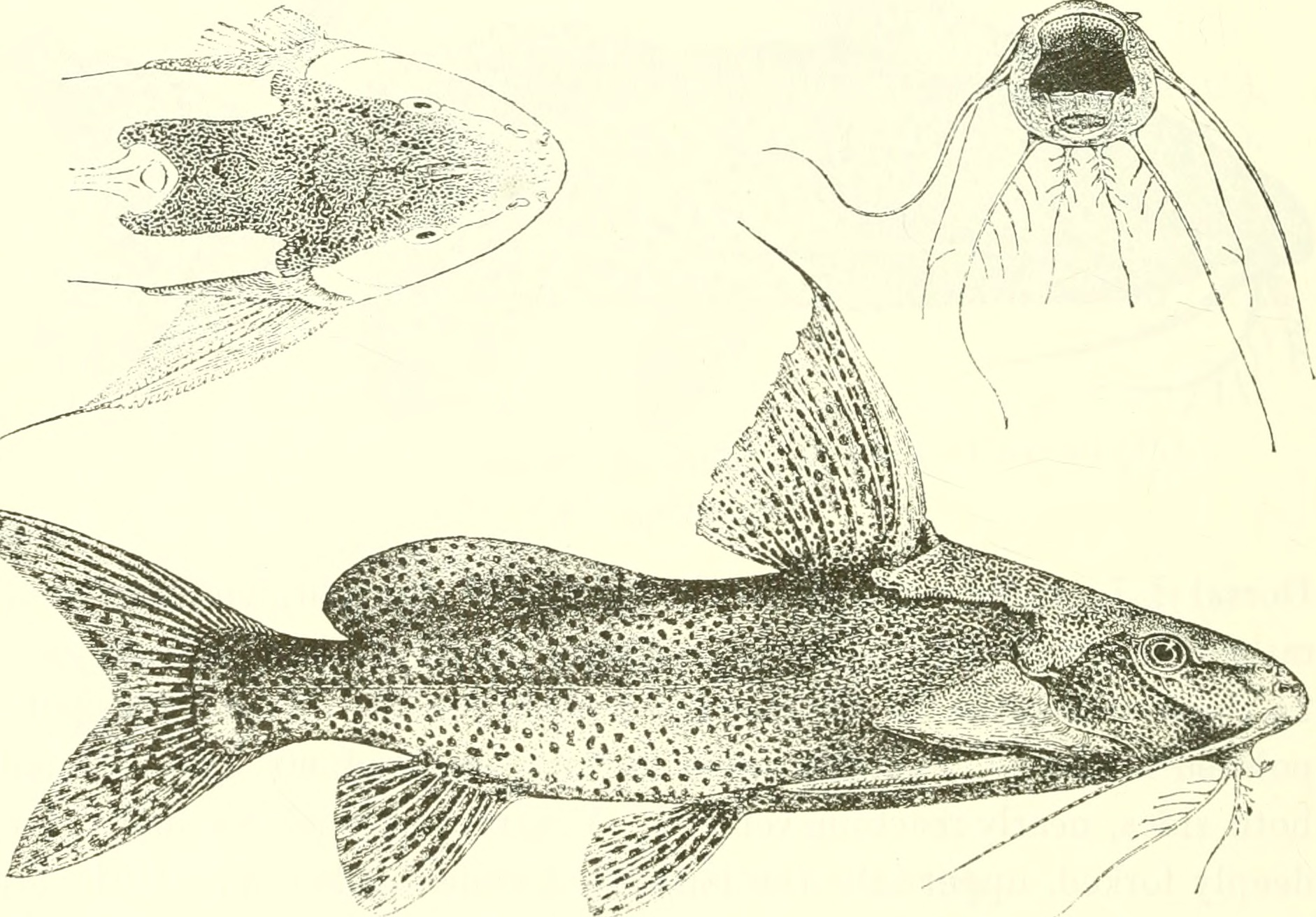

Scientific classification
- Kingdom: Animalia
- Phylum: Chordata
- Class: Actinopterygii
- Order: Siluriformes
- Family: Mochokidae
- Genus: Synodontis
- Species: S. melanostictus

Binomial name
- Synodontis melanostictus Boulenger, 1906

= Synodontis melanostictus =

Species of fish

Synodontis melanostictus is a species of upside-down catfish endemic to Lake Tanganyika and its tributaries. It has been found in Zambia, the Democratic Republic of the Congo, and Burundi. It was first described by British-Belgian zoologist George Albert Boulenger in 1906, based upon a specimen from the Lofubu River. The species name "melanostictus" is derived from a combination of the Greek melano, meaning black, and the Greek stiktos, meaning punctured or spotted. This refers to the black spotted pattern that occurs on the body of this species.

== Description ==
Like all members of the genus Synodontis, S. melanostictus has a strong, bony head capsule that extends back as far as the first spine of the dorsal fin. The head is about 1/4 of the standard length of the fish. The head contains a distinct narrow, bony, external protrusion called a humeral process. The shape and size of the humeral process helps to identify the species. In S. melanostictus, the humeral process is triangular, wide at the base and tapering to a sharp point, with a poorly defined ridge on the bottom edge, and becoming rough on the upper edge. The top edge is slightly concave. The total length of the humoral process is about two thirds of the length of the head. The diameter of the eye is about 1/7 of the length of the head.

The fish has three pairs of barbels. The maxillary barbels are on located on the upper jaw, and two pairs of mandibular barbels are on the lower jaw. The maxillary barbel has a narrow membrane attached near the base and is straight without any branches. It extends at least as far as the base of the pectoral fin, about as long as the 3/10 to 4/10 as long as the body. The outer pair of mandibular barbels extends just past the front of the pectoral girdle, about as long as head, and contains seven to eight, long branches, with short secondary branches present. The inner pair of mandibular barbels is about 1/2 as long as the outer pair, about 1/2 of the length of the head, with four to five pairs of branches, with secondary branches present.

The skin of S. melanostictus lacks the tiny vertical skin folds that are found on most other species of Synodontis found in Lake Tanganyika. The exact purpose of the skin folds is not known, but it is typically a characteristic of the species of Syndontis that are endemic to Lake Tanganyika. Thin papilla are present all over the head and body, but do not extend onto the fins.

The front edges of the dorsal fins and the pectoral fins of Syntontis species are hardened into stiff spines. In S. melanostictus, the spine of the dorsal fin is long, about 2/3 as long as the head, slightly curved, smooth on the front and serrated on the back, and ends with short, black filament. The remaining portion of the dorsal fin is made up of seven branching rays. The spine of the pectoral fin is slightly curved, about as long as the dorsal fin spine, finely serrated on the front and with large serrations on the back. The pectoral spine ends in moderate length, black filament. The rest of the pectoral fins are made up of nine to ten branching rays. The adipose fin does not contain any rays, is long and well developed, and has a convex shape. The pelvic fin contains one unbranched and six branched rays. The front edge of the pelvic fin is vertically aligned before the back end of the dorsal fin. The anal fin contains three to five unbranched and seven to nine branched rays; it is vertically aligned with the first 1/3 of the adipose fin. The tail, or caudal fin, is forked, and contains eight rays on the upper lobe, nine rays on the lower lobe.

The mouth of the fish faces downward and has wide lips that contain papilla. All members of Syndontis have a structure called a premaxillary toothpad, which is located on the very front of the upper jaw of the mouth. This structure contains several rows of short, chisel-shaped teeth. In some species, this toothpad is made up of a large patch with several rows in a large cluster. In other species of Syndontis, this toothpad is clearly divided into two separate groups, separated by a thin band of skin that divides the toothpad. This character is used as a method of differentiating between two different but similar species of Syndontis. In S. melanostictus, the toothpad is interrupted, or separated into two distinct groups. On the lower jaw, or mandible, the teeth of Syndontis are attached to flexible, stalk-like structures and described as "s-shaped" or "hooked". The number of teeth on the mandible is used to differentiate between species; in S. melanostictus, there are 23 to 36 teeth on the mandible, arranged in a single row.

Some of the species of Synodontis have an opening or series of openings called the axillary pore. It is located on the sides of the body below the humeral process and before the pectoral fin spine. The exact function of the port is not known to scientists, although its presence has been observed in seven other catfish genera. Fish in the genus Acrochordonichthys are known to secrete a mucus with toxic properties from their axillary pore, but there is no scientific consensus as to the exact purpose of the secretion or the pore. S. melanostictus does not have an axillary pore.

The back of the fish is grayish to copper brown, and is covered with small, scattered spots that sometimes intersect. The underside is pale. The barbels are white, and the fins have small black spots similar to those on the body.

The maximum standard length of known specimens is 42.5 centimetres (16.7 in) with a total length of 52 centimetres (20 in). Generally, females in the genus Synodontis tend to be slightly larger than males of the same age.

== Habitat and behavior ==
In the wild, the species is endemic to Lake Tanganyika, which has an observed temperature range of 22 to 26 °C (72 to 79 °F), an approximate pH of 8.5 – 9, and dH range of 4-15. It inhabits littoral to benthic zones over shell, sand, and mud bottoms, to a maximum depth of 150 metres (490 ft). The reproductive habits of most of the species of Synodontis are not known, beyond one report that found gravid females containing over 3,000 eggs. Spawning likely occurs during the flooding season between July and October, and pairs swim in unison during spawning. As a whole, species of Synodontis are omnivores, consuming insect larvae, algae, gastropods, bivalves, sponges, crustaceans, and the eggs of other fishes. The growth rate is rapid in the first year, then slows down as the fish age.
