= Synodontis rufigiensis =

Conservation status
- Least Concern (IUCN 3.1)

Scientific classification
- Kingdom: Animalia
- Phylum: Chordata
- Class: Actinopterygii
- Order: Siluriformes
- Family: Mochokidae
- Genus: Synodontis
- Species: S. rufigiensis

Binomial name
- Synodontis rufigiensis Bailey, 1968

Species of fish

Synodontis rufigiensis is a species of upside-down catfish endemic to Tanzania where it is found in the Rufiji River basin. This species grows to a length of 23 centimetres (9.1 in) TL.
