= Synodontis macropunctatus =

Scientific classification
- Kingdom: Animalia
- Phylum: Chordata
- Class: Actinopterygii
- Order: Siluriformes
- Family: Mochokidae
- Genus: Synodontis
- Species: S. macropunctatus

Binomial name
- Synodontis macropunctatus Wright & Page, 2008

Species of fish

Synodontis macropunctatus is a species of upside-down catfish endemic to Angola where it occurs in the Uamba River and in tributaries of the Luachimo River. This species grows to a length of 22.9 centimetres (9.0 in) SL.
