= Eastcoast squeaker =

Conservation status
- Data Deficient (IUCN 3.1)

Scientific classification
- Kingdom: Animalia
- Phylum: Chordata
- Class: Actinopterygii
- Order: Siluriformes
- Family: Mochokidae
- Genus: Synodontis
- Species: S. zanzibaricus

Binomial name
- Synodontis zanzibaricus Peters, 1868

Synonyms
- Synodontis zanzibarica (misspelling)

Species of fish

The eastcoast squeaker (Synodontis zanzibaricus) is a species of fish in the upside-down catfish family (Mochokidae). It is found in Kenya and Tanzania, and possibly in Somalia. Its natural habitat is rivers. This species grows to a length of 25 cm (9.8 in) TL.
