= Synodontis dekimpei =

Conservation status
- Critically Endangered (IUCN 3.1)

Scientific classification
- Kingdom: Animalia
- Phylum: Chordata
- Class: Actinopterygii
- Order: Siluriformes
- Family: Mochokidae
- Genus: Synodontis
- Species: S. dekimpei

Binomial name
- Synodontis dekimpei Paugy, 1987

Species of fish

Synodontis dekimpei is a species of upside-down catfish endemic to Guinea. It is only known from the Konkouré River where mining is causing the degradation of its habitat. This species grows to a length of 17.6 centimetres (6.9 in) SL.
