= Synodontis leopardus =

Conservation status
- Data Deficient (IUCN 3.1)

Scientific classification
- Domain: Eukaryota
- Kingdom: Animalia
- Phylum: Chordata
- Class: Actinopterygii
- Order: Siluriformes
- Family: Mochokidae
- Genus: Synodontis
- Species: S. leopardus

Binomial name
- Synodontis leopardus Pfeffer, 1896

Synonyms
- Synodontis leoparda Pfeffer, 1896

Species of fish

Synodontis leopardus is a species of upside-down catfish native to coastal rivers of Tanzania and Somalia. This species grows to a length of 6 centimetres (2.4 in) SL.
