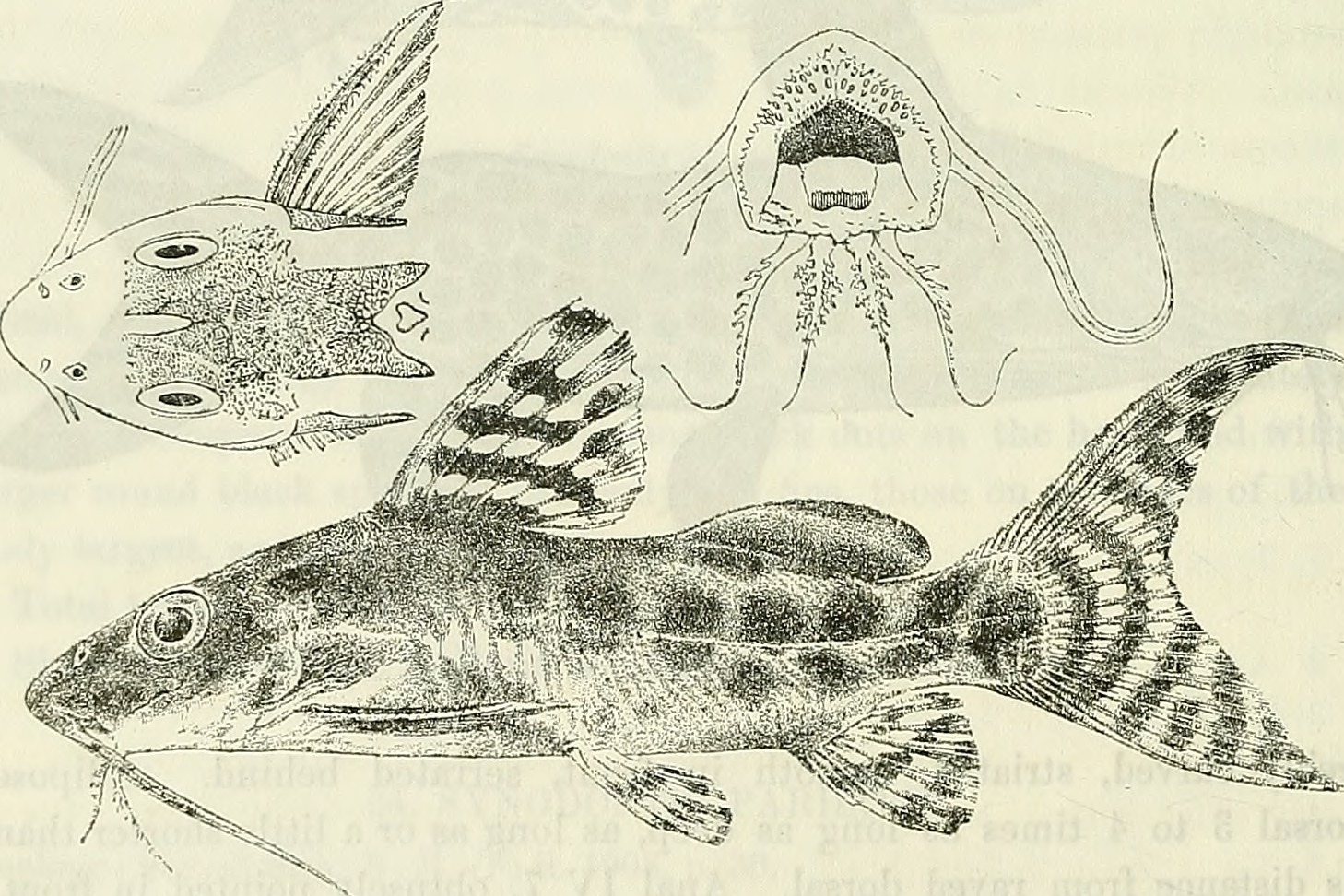

Conservation status
- Least Concern (IUCN 3.1)

Scientific classification
- Kingdom: Animalia
- Phylum: Chordata
- Class: Actinopterygii
- Order: Siluriformes
- Family: Mochokidae
- Genus: Synodontis
- Species: S. ornatipinnis

Binomial name
- Synodontis ornatipinnis Boulenger, 1899

= Synodontis ornatipinnis =

Species of fish

Synodontis ornatipinnis, known as the barfin synodontis, is a species of upside-down catfish that is native to the Congo Basin of the Democratic Republic of the Congo and Zambia. It was first described by British-Belgian zoologist George Albert Boulenger in 1899, from specimens collected in Mbandaka, on the Congo River in what is now the Democratic Republic of the Congo. The species name ornatipinnis means "ornate fins".

== Description ==
Like all members of the genus Synodontis, S. ornatipinnis has a strong, bony head capsule that extends back as far as the first spine of the dorsal fin. The head contains a distinct narrow, bony, external protrusion called a humeral process. The shape and size of the humeral process helps to identify the species. In S. ornatipinnis, the humeral process is rough, about 1 1/4 to 1 1/2 times as long as it is broad, without a ridge on the bottom edge, and pointed.

The fish has three pairs of barbels. The maxillary barbels are on located on the upper jaw, and two pairs of mandibular barbels are on the lower jaw. The maxillary barbel is long and straight without any branches, with a broad membrane at the base. It extends a little longer than the head. The outer pair of mandibular barbels is a little under twice the length of the inner pair. They have short branches.

The front edges of the dorsal fins and the pectoral fins of Syntontis species are hardened into stiff spines. In S. ornatipinnis, the spine of the dorsal fin is about 2/3 to 3/4 times as long as the head, slightly curved, smooth in the front and serrated on the back. The remaining portion of the dorsal fin is made up of seven branching rays. The spine of the pectoral fin is a little shorter than the head and serrated on both sides. The adipose fin is 3 to 4 times as long as it is deep. The anal fin contains four unbranched and seven branched rays, and is obtusely pointed in the front. The tail, or caudal fin, is deeply forked, crescent-shaped, with the top lobe larger than the bottom lobe.

All members of Syndontis have a structure called a premaxillary toothpad, which is located on the very front of the upper jaw of the mouth. This structure contains several rows of short, chisel-shaped teeth. In S. ornatipinnis, the toothpad forms a short and broad band. On the lower jaw, or mandible, the teeth of Syndontis are attached to flexible, stalk-like structures and described as "s-shaped" or "hooked". The number of teeth on the mandible is used to differentiate between species; in S. ornatipinnis, there are about 20 to 26 teeth on the mandible.

The base body color is yellowish or pale olive on the back and white on the underside. The fins are yellow, with black spots forming into bands.

The maximum total length of the species is 40 centimetres (16 in). Generally, females in the genus Synodontis tend to be slightly larger than males of the same age.

== Habitat and behavior ==
In the wild, the species is widespread throughout central Africa. The species is harvested for human consumption. The reproductive habits of most of the species of Synodontis are not known, beyond some instances of obtaining egg counts from gravid females. Spawning likely occurs during the flooding season between July and October, and pairs swim in unison during spawning. The growth rate is rapid in the first year, then slows down as the fish age.
