= Synodontis rebeli =

Conservation status
- Data Deficient (IUCN 3.1)

Scientific classification
- Kingdom: Animalia
- Phylum: Chordata
- Class: Actinopterygii
- Order: Siluriformes
- Family: Mochokidae
- Genus: Synodontis
- Species: S. rebeli

Binomial name
- Synodontis rebeli Holly, 1926

Species of fish

Synodontis rebeli is a species of upside-down catfish endemic to Cameroon where it occurs in the Sanaga River basin. This species grows to a length of 26.2 centimetres (10.3 in) TL.
