= Feather-barbelled squeaker =

Conservation status
- Data Deficient (IUCN 3.1)

Scientific classification
- Kingdom: Animalia
- Phylum: Chordata
- Class: Actinopterygii
- Order: Siluriformes
- Family: Mochokidae
- Genus: Synodontis
- Species: S. manni

Binomial name
- Synodontis manni De Vos, 2001

Species of fish

The feather-barbelled squeaker (Synodontis manni) is a species of upside-down catfish endemic to Kenya where it is found in the lower Tana River. This species grows to a length of 21.6 centimetres (8.5 in) SL.
