= Synodontis ilebrevis =

Scientific classification
- Kingdom: Animalia
- Phylum: Chordata
- Class: Actinopterygii
- Division: Teleostei
- Order: Siluriformes
- Family: Mochokidae
- Genus: Synodontis
- Species: S. ilebrevis

Binomial name
- Synodontis ilebrevis Wright & Page, 2006

Species of fish

Synodontis ilebrevis is a species of upside-down catfish endemic to Zambia, where it is only known from Lake Tanganyika. It was first described by Jeremy John Wright and Lawrence M. Page in 2006, from specimens collected from Lake Tanganyika at Cape Chaitika, Zambia. The species name comes from the Latin word "ile", meaning intestine, and the Latin word "bevis", meaning short, and refers to the relatively short gut of this species.

== Description ==
Like all members of the genus Synodontis, S. ilebrevis has a strong, bony head capsule that extends back as far as the first spine of the dorsal fin. The head is about 3/10 of the standard length of the fish. The head contains a distinct narrow, bony, external protrusion called a humeral process. The shape and size of the humeral process helps to identify the species. In S. ilebrevis, the humeral process is triangular and rough, with a poorly defined ridge on the bottom edge. The top edge is concave and the end is sharply pointed. It is about 4/10 of the length of the head. The diameter of the eye is about 1/7 of the length of the head.

The fish has three pairs of barbels. The maxillary barbels are on located on the upper jaw, and two pairs of mandibular barbels are on the lower jaw. The maxillary barbel has a narrow membrane attached near the base and is straight without any branches. It extends at least as far as the base of the pectoral spine, a bit less than half of length of the head. The outer pair of mandibular barbels extends just past the front of the pectoral girdle, about 1/3 of the length of the head, and contains three to six weak branches, usually without secondary branches. The inner pair of mandibular barbels is about 1/3 to 1/2 as long as the outer pair, about 2/10 of the length of the head, with three to five pairs of branches, with many secondary branches present.

The skin of S. ilebrevis has a large number of tiny vertical skin folds. The exact purpose of the skin folds is not known, but is a characteristic of the species of Syndontis that are endemic to Lake Tanganyika. External sort, flat papilla are present and give the skin a pebbled appearance.

The front edges of the dorsal fins and the pectoral fins of Syntontis species are hardened into stiff spines. In S. ilebrevis, the spine of the dorsal fin is short, about 2/3 as long as the head, slightly curved, rough on the front and serrated on the back, and ends with short, dusky filament. The remaining portion of the dorsal fin is made up of seven branching rays. The spine of the pectoral fin is slightly curved, about as long as the dorsal fin spine, rough on the front and with large serrations on the back. The pectoral spine ends in short, dusky filament. The rest of the pectoral fins are made up of eight to nine branching rays. The adipose fin does not contain any rays, is long and well developed, and has a convex shape. The pelvic fin contains one unbranched and six branched rays. The front edge of the pelvic fin is vertically aligned with the front edge of the adipose fin. The anal fin contains three to five unbranched and seven to nine branched rays; it is vertically aligned with the center of the adipose fin. The tail, or caudal fin, is forked, with rounded lobes, and contains eleven to fifteen rays on the upper lobe, seventeen rays on the lower lobe.

The mouth of the fish faces downward and has wide lips that contain papilla. All members of Syndontis have a structure called a premaxillary toothpad, which is located on the very front of the upper jaw of the mouth. This structure contains several rows of short, chisel-shaped teeth. In some species, this toothpad is made up of a large patch with several rows in a large cluster. In other species of Syndontis, this toothpad is clearly divided into two separate groups, separated by a thin band of skin that divides the toothpad. This character is used as a method of differentiating between two different but similar species of Syndontis. In S. ilebrevis, the toothpad is interrupted, or separated into two distinct groups. On the lower jaw, or mandible, the teeth of Syndontis are attached to flexible, stalk-like structures and described as "s-shaped" or "hooked". The number of teeth on the mandible is used to differentiate between species; in S. ilebrevis, there are 50 to 66 teeth on the mandible, arranged in eight short rows.

Some of the species of Synodontis have an opening or series of openings called the axillary pore. It is located on the sides of the body below the humeral process and before the pectoral fin spine. The exact function of the port is not known to scientists, although its presence has been observed in seven other catfish genera. Fish in the genus Acrochordonichthys are known to secrete a mucus with toxic properties from their axillary pore, but there is no scientific consensus as to the exact purpose of the secretion or the pore. S. ilebrevis does not have an axillary pore.

The back of the fish is olive brown, covered with small, regularly-shaped, widely spaced black spots. The underside is lighter, with smaller black spots. Most of the species of Synodontis of Lake Tanganyika have a recognizable pattern consisting of dark triangles at the bases of all of the rayed fins, present in S. ilebrevis, and the back edges of the fins are dusky in color. The caudal fin has a black bar that runs from the base of each lobe to the top of the fin. The barbels are white.

The maximum standard length of known specimens is 12 centimetres (4.7 in) with a total length of 15 centimetres (5.9 in). Generally, females in the genus Synodontis tend to be slightly larger than males of the same age.

== Habitat and behavior ==
In the wild, the species is endemic to Lake Tanganyika, which has an observed temperature range of 22 to 26 °C (72 to 79 °F), an approximate pH of 8.5 – 9, and dH range of 4-15. The exact habitat is unknown, but like other small species of Syndontis, it probably inhabits fairly shallow, rocky coastal areas. The reproductive habits of most of the species of Synodontis are not known, beyond some instances of obtaining egg counts from gravid females. Spawning likely occurs during the flooding season between July and October, and pairs swim in unison during spawning. As a whole, species of Synodontis are omnivores, consuming insect larvae, algae, gastropods, bivalves, sponges, crustaceans, and the eggs of other fishes. The growth rate is rapid in the first year, then slows down as the fish age.
