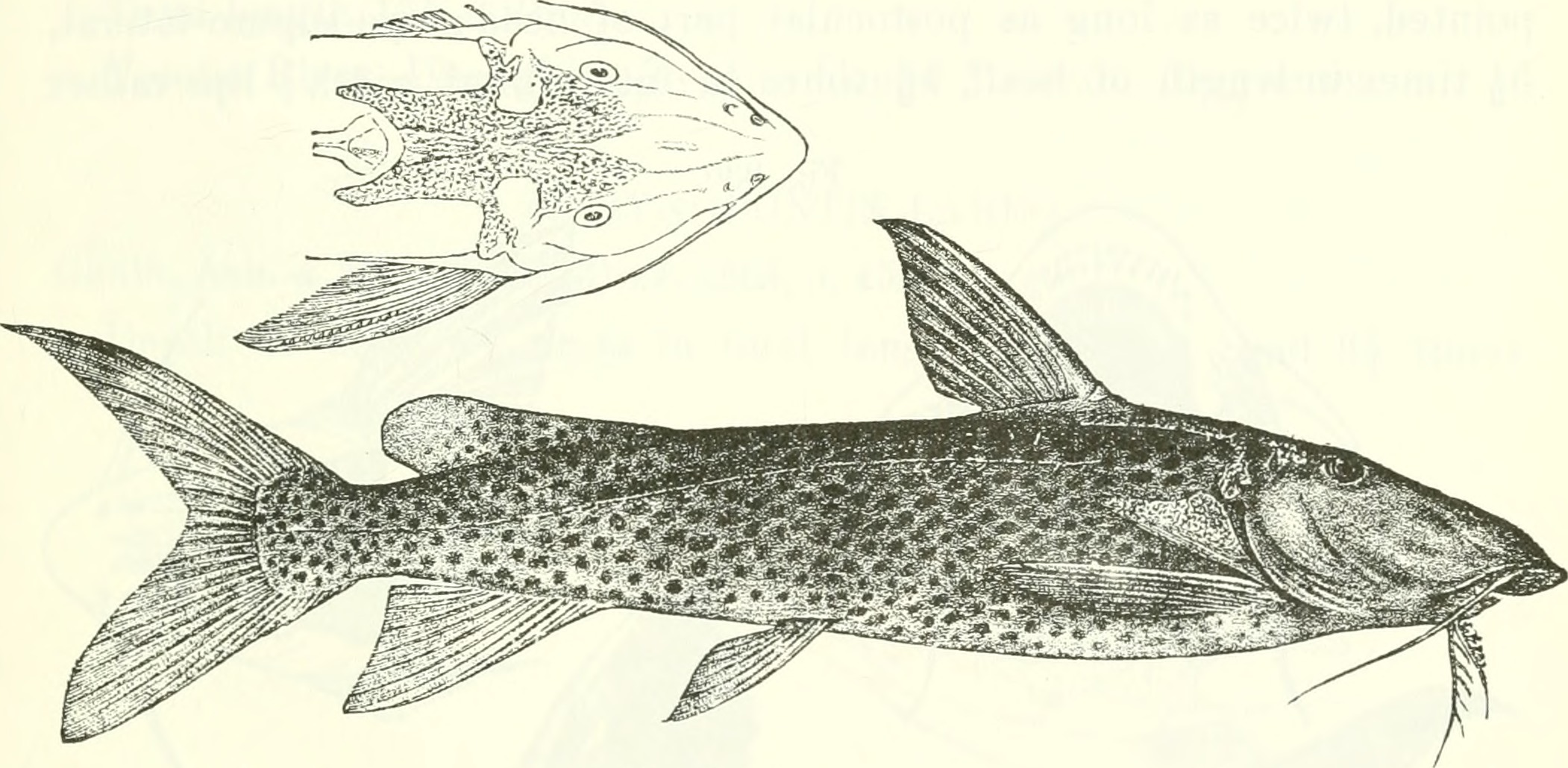

Conservation status
- Critically endangered, possibly extinct (IUCN 3.1)

Scientific classification
- Kingdom: Animalia
- Phylum: Chordata
- Class: Actinopterygii
- Order: Siluriformes
- Family: Mochokidae
- Genus: Synodontis
- Species: S. guttatus

Binomial name
- Synodontis guttatus Günther, 1865

= Synodontis guttatus =

Species of fish

Synodontis guttatus is a species of upside-down catfish that is native to the Niger River basin of Nigeria. It was first described by German ichthyologist Albert Günther in 1865, from the Niger River. The species name guttatus is the Latin word for "spotted", referring to the spots appearing on the fins and body of the fish.

== Description ==
Like all members of the genus Synodontis, S. guttatus has a strong, bony head capsule that extends back as far as the first spine of the dorsal fin. The head contains a distinct narrow, bony, external protrusion called a humeral process. The shape and size of the humeral process helps to identify the species. In S. guttatus, the humeral process is rough, much longer than it is broad, and pointed at the end.

The fish has three pairs of barbels. The maxillary barbels are on located on the upper jaw, and two pairs of mandibular barbels are on the lower jaw. The maxillary barbel is long and straight without any branches, without a membrane at the base. It extends about 3/4 as long as the head. The outer pair of mandibular barbels is a little under twice the length of the inner pair. They have short branches.

The front edges of the dorsal fins and the pectoral fins of Syntontis species are hardened into stiff spines. In S. guttatus, the spine of the dorsal fin is about 3/4 the length of the head, smooth in the front and serrated on the back. The remaining portion of the dorsal fin is made up of seven branching rays. The spine of the pectoral fin is about as long as the dorsal spine and serrated on both sides. The adipose fin is 3 times as long as it is deep. The anal fin contains three unbranched and eight branched rays, and is pointed in the front. The tail, or caudal fin, is deeply notched.

All members of Syndontis have a structure called a premaxillary toothpad, which is located on the very front of the upper jaw of the mouth. This structure contains several rows of short, chisel-shaped teeth. In S. guttatus, the toothpad forms a broad crescent-shaped band. On the lower jaw, or mandible, the teeth of Syndontis are attached to flexible, stalk-like structures and described as "s-shaped" or "hooked". The number of teeth on the mandible is used to differentiate between species; in S. guttatus, there are about 30 teeth on the mandible.

The base body color is brown, and the body is covered with small, round dark spots.

The maximum total length of the species is 70 centimetres (28 in). Generally, females in the genus Synodontis tend to be slightly larger than males of the same age.

== Habitat and behavior ==
In the wild, the species is known from only one location in Nigeria in the lower Niger River. The species is harvested for human consumption. The primary threats to the species arise from pollution in its habitat and the small area of habitat, and it is listed as an endangered species. The reproductive habits of most of the species of Synodontis are not known, beyond some instances of obtaining egg counts from gravid females. Spawning likely occurs during the flooding season between July and October, and pairs swim in unison during spawning. The growth rate is rapid in the first year, then slows down as the fish age.
