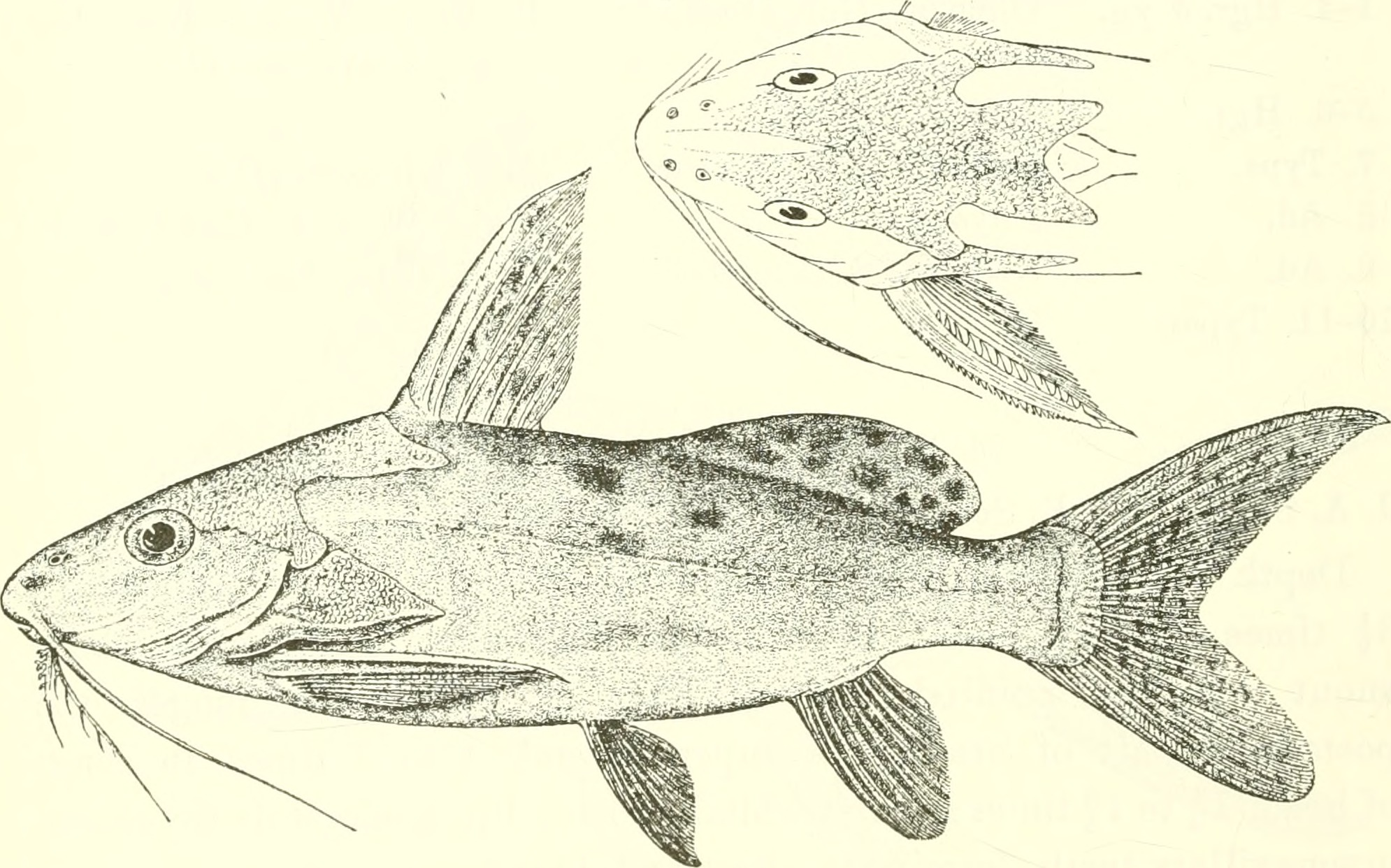

Conservation status
- Least Concern (IUCN 3.1)

Scientific classification
- Domain: Eukaryota
- Kingdom: Animalia
- Phylum: Chordata
- Class: Actinopterygii
- Order: Siluriformes
- Family: Mochokidae
- Genus: Synodontis
- Species: S. haugi

Binomial name
- Synodontis haugi Pellegrin, 1906

= Synodontis haugi =

Species of fish

Synodontis haugi, known as the black synodontis, is a species of upside-down catfish native to Gabon where it is found in the Ogowe River basin. It was first collected by M.E. Haug and described by French zoologist Jacques Pellegrin in 1906, based upon a holotype discovered in the Ogooué River, near Ngomo, Gabon. The specific name "huagi" is a tribute to the original collector of the species.

== Description ==
The body of the fish is a uniform brown or brown with indistinct darker spots on the body and fins. Juveniles may also display large dark brown spots on the sides.

Like other members of the genus, this fish has a humeral process, which is a bony spike that is attached to a hardened head cap on the fish and can be seen extending beyond the gill opening. The humeral process on this species is obtusely keeled, much longer than deep, acutely pointed, and extends slightly beyond the occipito-nuchal process. The first ray of the dorsal fin has a hardened first ray which is slightly serrated and is as long or slightly shorter than the head. The pectoral spine is as long as the dorsal and strongly serrated on both sides, especially the inner side. The caudal fin is deeply forked. It has short, cone-shaped teeth in the upper jaw. In the lower jaw, the teeth are s-shaped and movable. The fish has one pair of long maxillary barbels, extending far beyond the operculum, and two pairs of mandibular barbels that are often branched. The adipose fin is 3 to 3 1/2 times as long as it is deep. set far back.

This species grows to a length of 25 centimetres (9.8 in) SL although specimens up to 30.2 centimetres (11.9 in) TL have been recorded in the wild.

== Habitat ==
In the wild, the species inhabits tropical waters in the Ogowe River basin in Gabon.
