= Synodontis comoensis =

Conservation status
- Least Concern (IUCN 3.1)

Scientific classification
- Kingdom: Animalia
- Phylum: Chordata
- Class: Actinopterygii
- Order: Siluriformes
- Family: Mochokidae
- Genus: Synodontis
- Species: S. comoensis

Binomial name
- Synodontis comoensis Daget & Lévêque, 1981

Species of fish

Synodontis comoensis is a species of upside-down catfish endemic to Côte d'Ivoire. This species grows to a length of 22 centimetres (8.7 in) TL.
