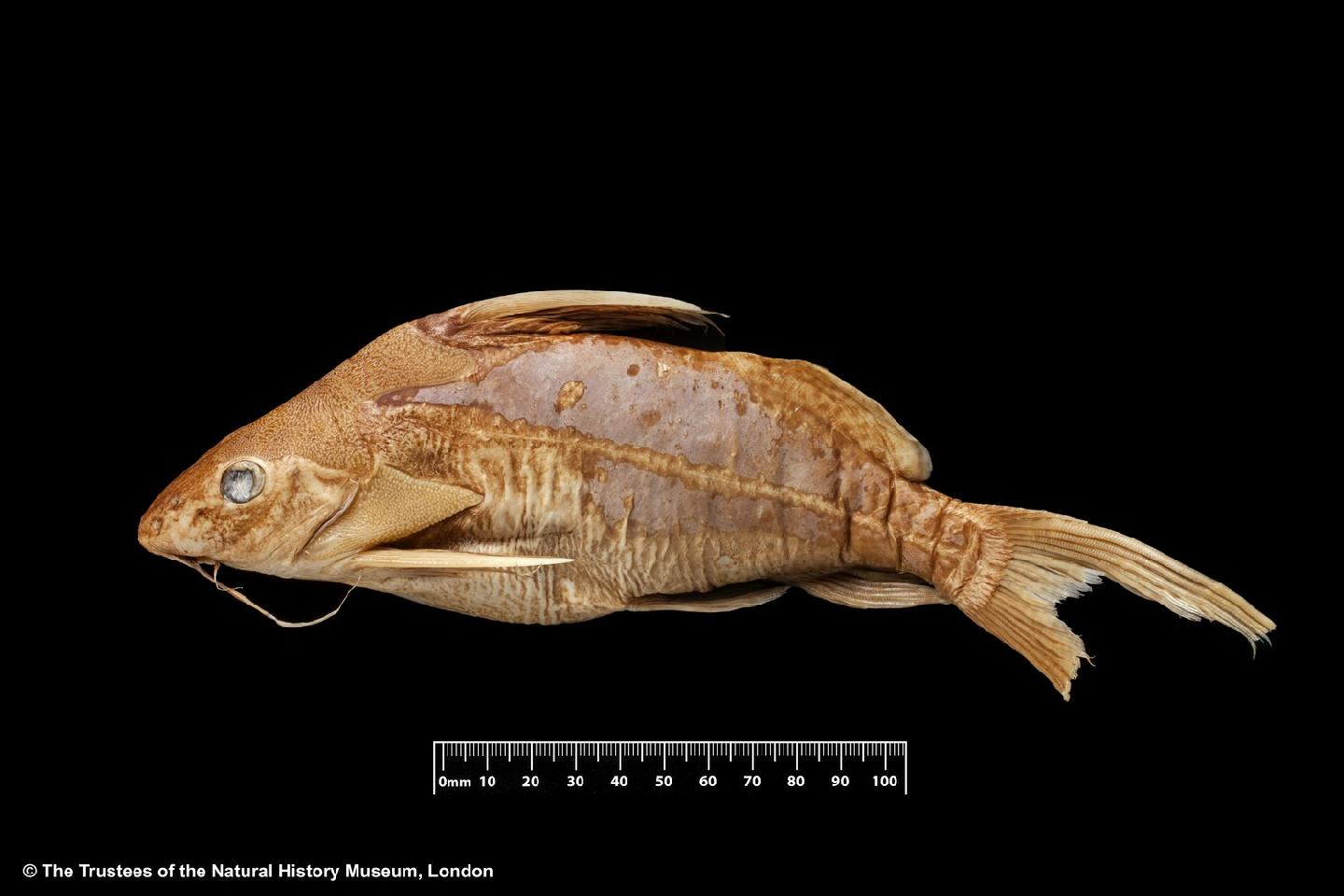

Conservation status
- Least Concern (IUCN 3.1)

Scientific classification
- Kingdom: Animalia
- Phylum: Chordata
- Class: Actinopterygii
- Order: Siluriformes
- Family: Mochokidae
- Genus: Synodontis
- Species: S. obesus

Binomial name
- Synodontis obesus Boulenger, 1898

= Synodontis obesus =

Species of fish

Synodontis obesus, known as the Coas synodontis, is a species of upside-down catfish that is native to the coastal drainages of Cameroon, Ghana, Nigeria and Togo. It was first described by British-Belgian zoologist George Albert Boulenger in 1898. The species name obesus is derived from the Latin word obesus, meaning "fat".

== Description ==
Like all members of the genus Synodontis, S. obesus has a strong, bony head capsule that extends back as far as the first spine of the dorsal fin. The head contains a distinct narrow, bony, external protrusion called a humeral process. The shape and size of the humeral process helps to identify the species. In S. obesus, the humeral process is longer than it is broad, rough, and with or without a very indistinct ridge on the lower edge.

The fish has three pairs of barbels. The maxillary barbels are on located on the upper jaw, and two pairs of mandibular barbels are on the lower jaw. The maxillary barbel is long and straight without any branches, with a broad membrane at the base. It extends to a length of about 1 1/6 to 1 1/3 times the length of the head. The outer pair of mandibular barbels is about twice the length of the inner pair, and both pairs have moderately long, simple branches.

The front edges of the dorsal fins and the pectoral fins of Syntontis species are hardened into stiff spines. In S. obesus, the spine of the dorsal fin is about 2/3 times to as long as the head, slightly curved, smooth in the front and serrated on the back. The remaining portion of the dorsal fin is made up of seven branching rays. The spine of the pectoral fin is about as long as the dorsal spine, and serrated on both sides. The adipose fin is 3 to 4 times as long as it is deep. The anal fin contains four unbranched and eight to nine branched rays. The tail, or caudal fin, is deeply forked, with the upper lobe longer, ending in a filament.

All members of Syndontis have a structure called a premaxillary toothpad, which is located on the very front of the upper jaw of the mouth. This structure contains several rows of short, chisel-shaped teeth. In S. obesus, the toothpad forms a short and broad band. On the lower jaw, or mandible, the teeth of Syndontis are attached to flexible, stalk-like structures and described as "s-shaped" or "hooked". The number of teeth on the mandible is used to differentiate between species; in S. obesus, there are about 18 to 28 teeth on the mandible.

The base body color is brown, with darker brown spots or dots, which are more distinct in juvenile fish. Juveniles have whitish fins with round black spots.

The maximum standard length of the species is 25.8 centimetres (10.2 in). Generally, females in the genus Synodontis tend to be slightly larger than males of the same age.

== Habitat and behavior ==
In the wild, the species has been found in the coastal drainages of the Bay of Guinea from Ghana to Gabon. The fish has an electric organ that is able to emit a weak electric current for location and protection. It is able to breathe air, which enables it to live in environments with low dissolved oxygen. The species is commercially used as an aquarium species. The reproductive habits of most of the species of Synodontis are not known, beyond some instances of obtaining egg counts from gravid females. Spawning likely occurs during the flooding season between July and October, and pairs swim in unison during spawning. As a whole, species of Synodontis are omnivores, consuming insect larvae, algae, gastropods, bivalves, sponges, crustaceans, and the eggs of other fishes. The growth rate is rapid in the first year, then slows down as the fish age.
