= Synodontis khartoumensis =

Conservation status
- Data Deficient (IUCN 3.1)

Scientific classification
- Kingdom: Animalia
- Phylum: Chordata
- Class: Actinopterygii
- Order: Siluriformes
- Family: Mochokidae
- Genus: Synodontis
- Species: S. khartoumensis

Binomial name
- Synodontis khartoumensis Abu Gideiri, 1967

Species of fish

Synodontis khartoumensis is a species of upside-down catfish that is native to the Democratic Republic of the Congo, Sudan and Uganda where it occurs in Lake Albert and the Nile basin. It was first described by Yousif Babiker Abu Gideiri in 1967. The original specimens were obtained in the Blue Nile, about 2 miles away from the confluence of the Blue Nile and the White Nile, near Khartoum, Sudan. The species name khartoumensis is derived from the city of Khartoum, where the type species was originally found.

== Description ==
Like all members of the genus Synodontis, S. khartoumensis has a strong, bony head capsule that extends back as far as the first spine of the dorsal fin. The head contains a distinct narrow, bony, external protrusion called a humeral process. The fish has three pairs of barbels. The maxillary barbels are on located on the upper jaw, and two pairs of mandibular barbels are on the lower jaw. The adipose fin is large and the tail, or caudal fin, is forked.

The front edges of the dorsal fins and the pectoral fins are hardened into stiff spines. These spines can be raised into position at right angles to the body and locked into position for defensive purposes. The ability to lock the spines into place comes from several small bones attached to the spine, and once raised, the spines cannot be folded down by exerting pressure on the tip.

The fish has a structure called a premaxillary toothpad, which is located on the very front of the upper jaw of the mouth. This structure contains several rows of short, chisel-shaped teeth. On the lower jaw, or mandible, the teeth are attached to flexible, stalk-like structures and described as "s-shaped" or "hooked".

The maximum total length of the species is 21 centimeters (8.3 in). Generally, females in the genus Synodontis tend to be slightly larger than males of the same age.

== Habitat and behavior ==
In the wild, the species occurs in running and standing waters in the upper Nile basin. It is harvested for human consumption. As a whole, species of Synodontis are omnivores, consuming insect larvae, algae, gastropods, bivalves, sponges, crustaceans, and the eggs of other fishes. The reproductive habits of most of the species of Synodontis are not known, beyond some instances of obtaining egg counts from gravid females. Spawning likely occurs during the flooding season between July and October, and pairs swim in unison during spawning. The growth rate is rapid in the first year, then slows down as the fish age.
