= Synodontis levequei =

Conservation status
- Vulnerable (IUCN 3.1)

Scientific classification
- Domain: Eukaryota
- Kingdom: Animalia
- Phylum: Chordata
- Class: Actinopterygii
- Order: Siluriformes
- Family: Mochokidae
- Genus: Synodontis
- Species: S. levequei

Binomial name
- Synodontis levequei Paugy, 1987

Species of fish

Synodontis levequei is a species of upside-down catfish endemic to Guinea, where it occurs in the Konkouré River basin. This species grows to a length of 17.7 centimetres (7.0 in) SL.
