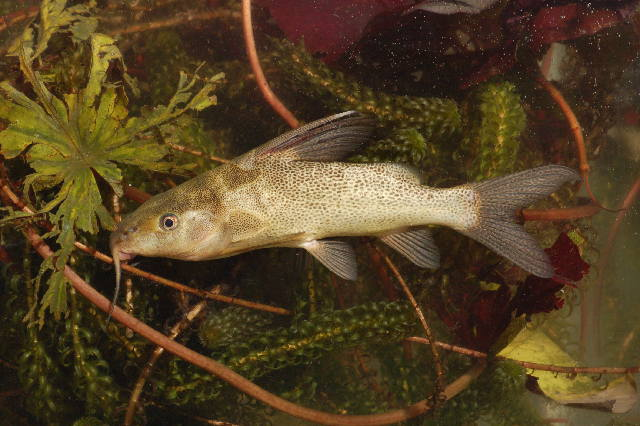

Conservation status
- Least Concern (IUCN 3.1)

Scientific classification
- Domain: Eukaryota
- Kingdom: Animalia
- Phylum: Chordata
- Class: Actinopterygii
- Order: Siluriformes
- Family: Mochokidae
- Genus: Synodontis
- Species: S. thamalakanensis

Binomial name
- Synodontis thamalakanensis Fowler, 1935

= Synodontis thamalakanensis =

Species of fish

Synodontis thamalakanensis is a species of upside-down catfish native to Botswana and Namibia. This species grows to a length of 17.5 centimetres (6.9 in) SL.
