= Synodontis vaillanti =

Conservation status
- Data Deficient (IUCN 3.1)

Scientific classification
- Domain: Eukaryota
- Kingdom: Animalia
- Phylum: Chordata
- Class: Actinopterygii
- Order: Siluriformes
- Family: Mochokidae
- Genus: Synodontis
- Species: S. vaillanti

Binomial name
- Synodontis vaillanti Boulenger, 1897

Species of fish

Synodontis vaillanti is a species of upside-down catfish endemic to the Central African Republic, where it is known only from the upper Ubangui River in the central Congo River basin. This species grows to a length of 58 centimetres (23 in) TL.

It was first described by George Albert Boulenger in 1897.
