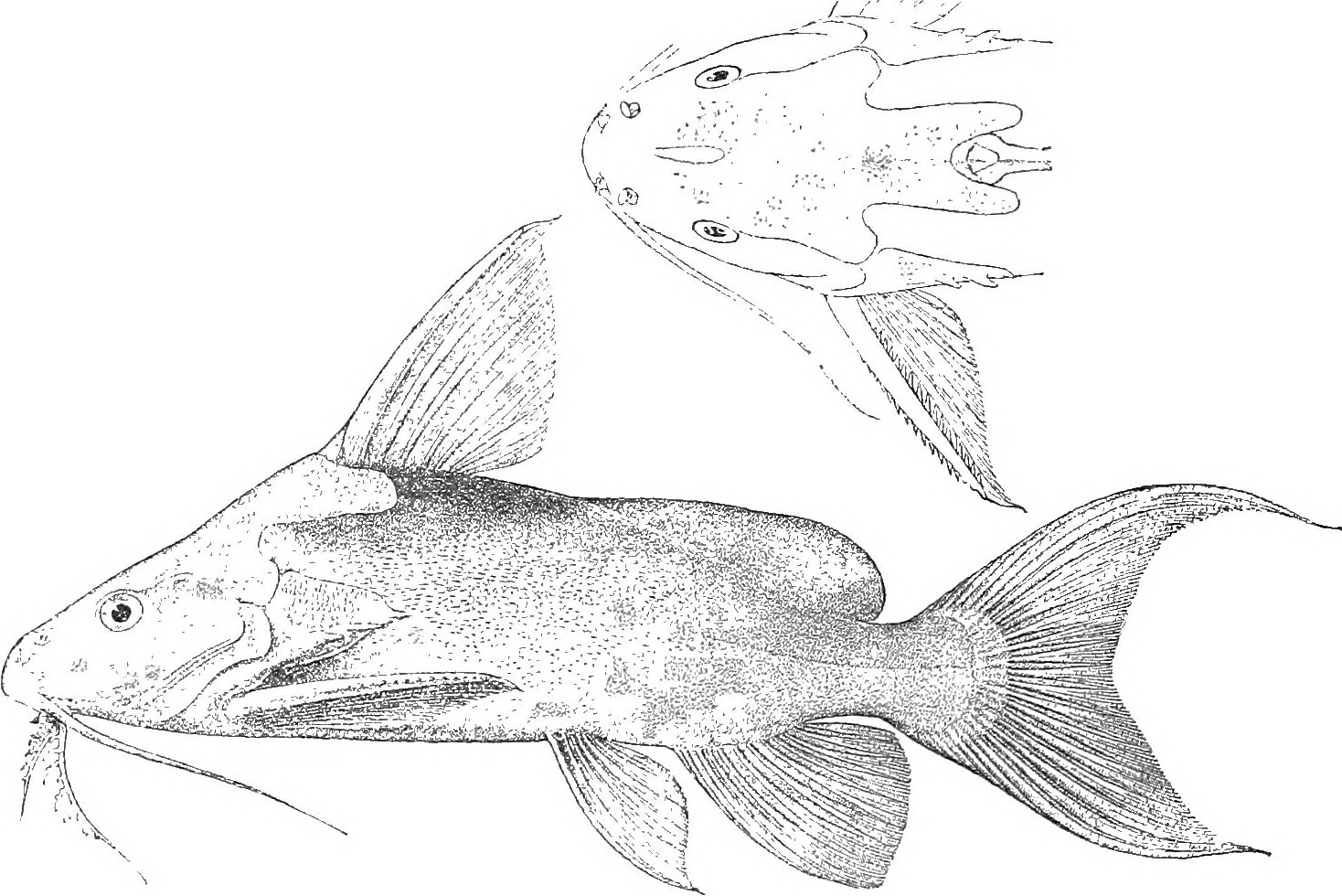

Conservation status
- Least Concern (IUCN 3.1)

Scientific classification
- Kingdom: Animalia
- Phylum: Chordata
- Class: Actinopterygii
- Order: Siluriformes
- Family: Mochokidae
- Genus: Synodontis
- Species: S. omias

Binomial name
- Synodontis omias Günther, 1864

= Synodontis omias =

Species of fish

Synodontis omias is a species of upside-down catfish native to the Niger River basin of Guinea, Mali, Niger and Nigeria. It was first described by German-born British zoologist, ichthyologist, and herpetologist Albert Günther in 1864, from a specimen collected in Jebba, Nigeria, on the Niger River. There have been very few specimens of this species identified, and it may be the same species as S. budgetti from the Upper Niger.

== Description ==
Like all members of the genus Synodontis, S. omias has a strong, bony head capsule that extends back as far as the first spine of the dorsal fin. The head contains a distinct narrow, bony, external protrusion called a humeral process. The shape and size of the humeral process helps to identify the species. In S. omias, the humeral process is 1 1/2 as long as it is wide, and has two or three spines directed backwards.

The fish has three pairs of barbels. The maxillary barbels are on located on the upper jaw, and two pairs of mandibular barbels are on the lower jaw. The maxillary barbel is straight without any branches, with a narrow membrane at the base. It extends a bit beyond the head, reaching the front part of the pectoral spine. The outer pair of mandibular barbels is longer than the inner pair, and is about twice as long as the inner pair of barbels. Both pairs have short branches.

The front edges of the dorsal fins and the pectoral fins of Syntontis species are hardened into stiff spines. In S. omias, the spine of the dorsal fin is long, about as long or slightly longer than the length of the head, slightly curved, and smooth in the front and serrated on the back. The remaining portion of the dorsal fin is made up of seven branching rays. The spine of the pectoral fin about as long as the dorsal fin spine, and serrated on both sides. The adipose fin is 3 to 3 1/2 times as long as it is deep. The anal fin contains five unbranched and seven to eight branched rays. The tail, or caudal fin, is deeply forked, with both lobes ending in a long filament.

All members of Syndontis have a structure called a premaxillary toothpad, which is located on the very front of the upper jaw of the mouth. This structure contains several rows of short, chisel-shaped teeth. In S. omias, the toothpad forms a short and broad band. On the lower jaw, or mandible, the teeth of Syndontis are attached to flexible, stalk-like structures and described as "s-shaped" or "hooked". The number of teeth on the mandible is used to differentiate between species; in S. omias, there are 40 to 50 teeth on the mandible.

The body color is a uniform brownish.

The maximum total length of the species is 36 centimetres (14 in). Generally, females in the genus Synodontis tend to be slightly larger than males of the same age.

== Habitat and behavior ==
In the wild, the species has been found in the inland Niger River basin, although the entire range is not currently known. The reproductive habits of most of the species of Synodontis are not known, beyond some instances of obtaining egg counts from gravid females. Spawning likely occurs during the flooding season between July and October, and pairs swim in unison during spawning. As a whole, species of Synodontis are omnivores, consuming insect larvae, algae, gastropods, bivalves, sponges, crustaceans, and the eggs of other fishes. The growth rate is rapid in the first year, then slows down as the fish age.
