= Ricardo's squeaker =

Conservation status
- Least Concern (IUCN 3.1)

Scientific classification
- Kingdom: Animalia
- Phylum: Chordata
- Class: Actinopterygii
- Order: Siluriformes
- Family: Mochokidae
- Genus: Synodontis
- Species: S. ricardoae

Binomial name
- Synodontis ricardoae Seegers, 1996

Species of fish

Ricardo's squeaker (Synodontis ricardoae) is a species of upside-down catfish endemic to Tanzania. This species grows to a length of 7.75 centimetres (3.05 in) TL.
