= Synodontis woleuensis =

Conservation status
- Data Deficient (IUCN 3.1)

Scientific classification
- Domain: Eukaryota
- Kingdom: Animalia
- Phylum: Chordata
- Class: Actinopterygii
- Order: Siluriformes
- Family: Mochokidae
- Genus: Synodontis
- Species: S. woleuensis

Binomial name
- Synodontis woleuensis Friel & Sullivan, 2008

Species of fish

Synodontis woleuensis is a species of upside-down catfish native to Equatorial Guinea and Gabon. It was first described in 2008 by American zoologists John P. Friel and John P. Sullivan. The original holotypes were collected in the Woleu-Ntem Province, Gabon. The specific name "woleuensis" is derived from the Woleu River, where the specimens were originally collected.

== Description ==
The body of the fish is dark brown, with a variable pattern and number of light, cream-colored spots. The ventral surface is light colored. The caudal fin has a narrow, light-colored curved band along the anterior margin.

Like other members of the genus, this fish has a humeral process, which is a bony spike that is attached to a hardened head cap on the fish and can be seen extending beyond the gill opening. The first ray of the dorsal fin and the pectoral fins have a hardened first ray which is serrated. The caudal fin is forked. It has short, cone-shaped teeth in the upper jaw. In the lower jaw, the teeth are s-shaped and movable. The fish has one pair of long maxillary barbels, extending far beyond the operculum, and two pairs of mandibular barbels that are often branched. The adipose fin is present.

This species grows to a length of up to 5.1 centimetres (2.0 in) SL.

== Habitat ==
In the wild, the species inhabits tropical freshwater environments. It has only been found in two locations, but may be more widespread than is currently known. Specimens have been found in the Woleau River of Gabon and Equatorial Guinea, and the Kyé River that runs along the border between Equatorial Guinea and Gabon.
