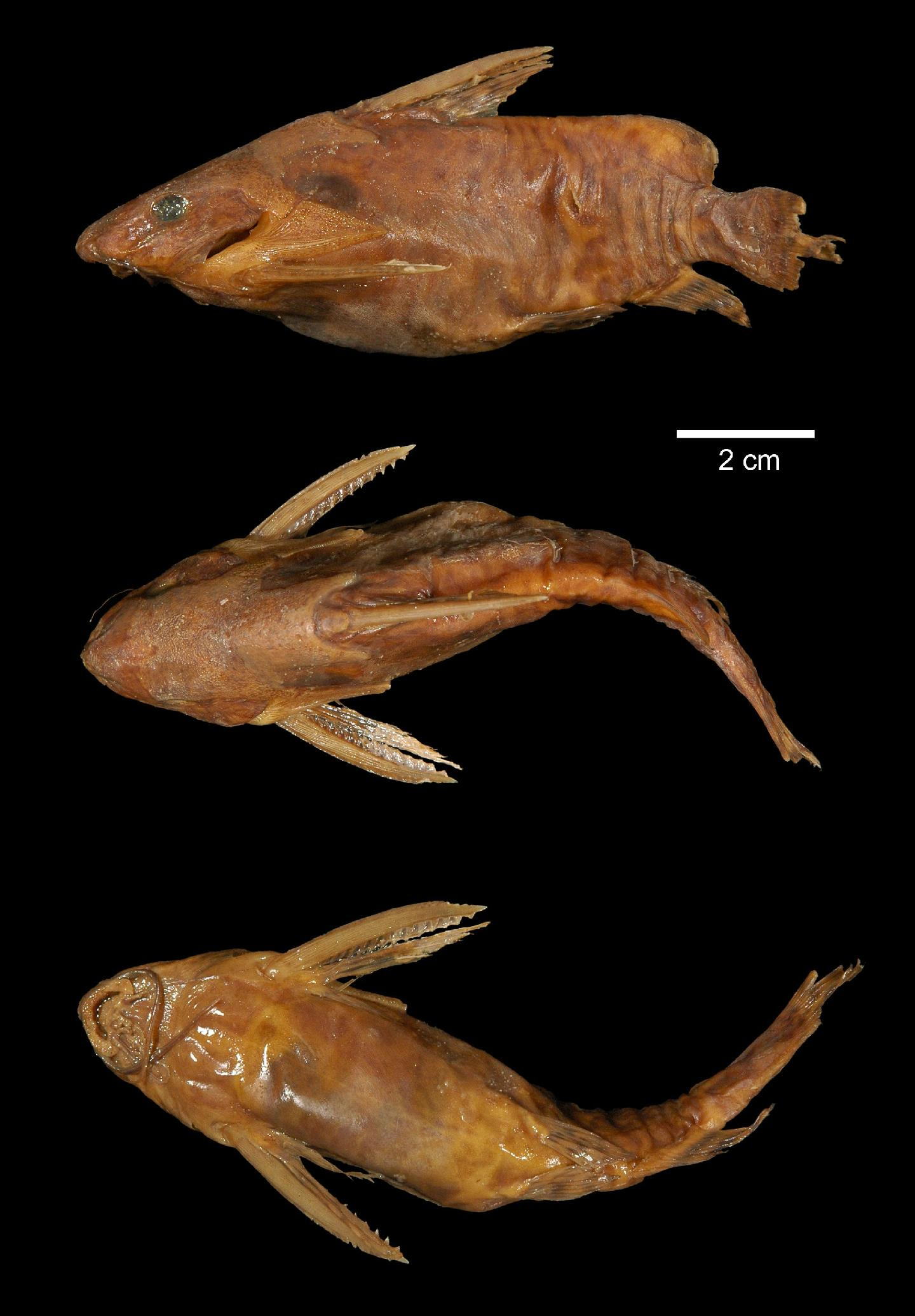

Conservation status
- Least Concern (IUCN 3.1)

Scientific classification
- Kingdom: Animalia
- Phylum: Chordata
- Class: Actinopterygii
- Order: Siluriformes
- Family: Mochokidae
- Genus: Synodontis
- Species: S. serpentis

Binomial name
- Synodontis serpentis Whitehead, 1962

= Synodontis serpentis =

Species of fish

Synodontis serpentis, the Tana squeaker, is a species of upside-down catfish endemic to Kenya where it is found in the Athi and Tana River systems. This species grows to a length of 12.4 centimetres (4.9 in) TL.
