= Synodontis dhonti =

Conservation status
- Least Concern (IUCN 3.1)

Scientific classification
- Kingdom: Animalia
- Phylum: Chordata
- Class: Actinopterygii
- Division: Teleostei
- Order: Siluriformes
- Family: Mochokidae
- Genus: Synodontis
- Species: S. dhonti

Binomial name
- Synodontis dhonti Boulenger, 1917

Species of catfish

Synodontis dhonti is a species of upside-down catfish endemic to the Democratic Republic of the Congo where it is only known from Lake Tanganyika. It was first described by Belgian-British zoologist George Albert Boulenger in 1917, based upon a single specimen collected from Lake Tanganyika at Kilewa Bay, in what is now the Democratic Republic of the Congo. The species is named after M.G. Dhont-De Bie, who accompanied the collector, Dr. L. Stappers, on his expedition. At one point, identified specimens Synodontis irsacae was believed to be juvenile individuals of S. dhonti and the two were considered to be the same species, but further research has identified differences between the two species and they are once again recognized as distinct from each other.

== Description ==
Like all members of the genus Synodontis, S. dhonti has a strong, bony head capsule that extends back as far as the first spine of the dorsal fin. The head is about 1/3 of the standard length of the fish. The head contains a distinct narrow, bony external protrusion called a humeral process. The shape and size of the humeral process help to identify the species. In S. dhonti, the humeral process is narrow, long, and rough in appearance. The top edge is concave and the end is blunt. It is about 1/2 of the length of the head. The diameter of the eye is about 1/9 of the length of the head.

The fish has three pairs of barbels. The maxillary barbels are located on the upper jaw, and two pairs of mandibular barbels are on the lower jaw. The maxillary barbel has a narrow membrane attached near the base and is straight without any branches. It extends at least as far as the base of the pectoral fin, about 7/10 of the length of the head. The outer pair of mandibular barbels extends just short of the pectoral girdle, about 1/3 of the length of the head, and contains four to five branches. The inner pair of mandibular barbels is about half as long as the outer pair, about 1/6 of the length of the head, with two pairs of branches, with secondary branches present.

The skin of S. dhonti has a large number of tiny vertical skin folds. The exact purpose of the skin folds is not known, but is a characteristic of the species of Syndontis that are endemic to Lake Tanganyika. External granular papilla are present.

The front edges of the dorsal fins and the pectoral fins of Syntontis species are hardened into stiff spines. In S. dhonti, the spine of the dorsal fin is long, about 7/10 as long as the head, is almost completely straight, is smooth on the front and serrated on the back, and ends with short, dark filaments. The remaining portion of the dorsal fin is made up of seven dark branching rays. The spine of the pectoral fin is slightly curved, roughly as long as the dorsal fin spine, with large serrations on the backside. The pectoral spine ends in short, dark filaments. The rest of the pectoral fins are made up of eight branching rays. The adipose fin does not contain any rays and has a convex shape. The pelvic fin contains one unbranched and six branched rays. The front edge of the pelvic fin is vertically aligned with the back edge of the dorsal fin. The anal fin contains 5 unbranched and 8 branched rays; it is vertically aligned with the adipose fin. The tail, or caudal fin, is forked, with pointed lobes, and contains eight rays on the upper lobe, nine rays on the lower lobe.

The mouth of the fish faces downward and has wide lips that contain papilla. All members of Syndontis have a structure called a premaxillary toothpad, which is located on the very front of the upper jaw of the mouth. This structure contains several rows of short, chisel-shaped teeth. In some species, this toothpad is made up of a large patch with several rows in a large cluster. In other species of Syndontis, this toothpad is clearly divided into two separate groups, separated by a thin band of skin that divides the toothpad. This character is used as a method of differentiating between to different but similar species of Syndontis. In S. dhonti, the toothpad is uninterrupted, or continuous without a break. On the lower jaw, or mandible, the teeth of Syndontis are attached to flexible, stalk-like structures and described as "s-shaped" or "hooked". The number of teeth on the mandible is used to differentiate between species; in S. dhonti, there are 22 teeth on the mandible, arranged in a single row.

Some of the species of Synodontis have an opening or series of openings called the axillary pore. It is located on the side of the body below the humeral process and before the pectoral fin spine. The exact function of the port is not known to scientists, although its presence has been observed in seven other catfish genera. Fish in the genus Acrochordonichthys have been observed to secrete a mucus with toxic properties from their axillary pore, but there is no scientific consensus as to the exact purpose of the secretion or the pore. S. dhonti has a large axillary pore just below the humeral process.

The only identified specimen of this species has been preserved in alcohol for nearly a century, so most of the specimen's original colors have been lost. However, most of the species of Synodontis of Lake Tanganyika have a recognizable pattern consisting of dark triangles at the bases of all of the rayed fins, present in S. dhonti, and dark spots that may or may not extend to the belly. The barbels are usually white but may have scattered pigmentation near their bases. Body colors can vary widely. The rays of the fins are dark.

The standard length of the known specimen is 32.5 centimetres (12.8 in) and a total length of 39.5 centimetres (15.6 in). In general in genus Synodontis species, females are slightly larger than males of the same age.

== Habitat and behavior ==
In the wild, the species is endemic to Lake Tanganyika, which has a temperature range of 23 to 26 °C (73 to 79 °F), and an approximate pH of 8.5 – 9, and a dH range of 4-15. Synodontis species in the lake tend to inhabit mainly the rocky shoreline areas, as well as sandy and shell-covered bottom areas. The reproductive habits of most of the species of Synodontis are not known, beyond some instances of obtaining egg counts from gravid females. Spawning likely occurs during the flooding season between July and October, and pairs swim in unison during spawning. As a whole, species of Synodontis are omnivores, consuming insect larvae, algae, gastropods, bivalves, sponges, crustaceans, and the eggs of other fishes. The growth rate is rapid in the first year, then slows down as the fish age.
