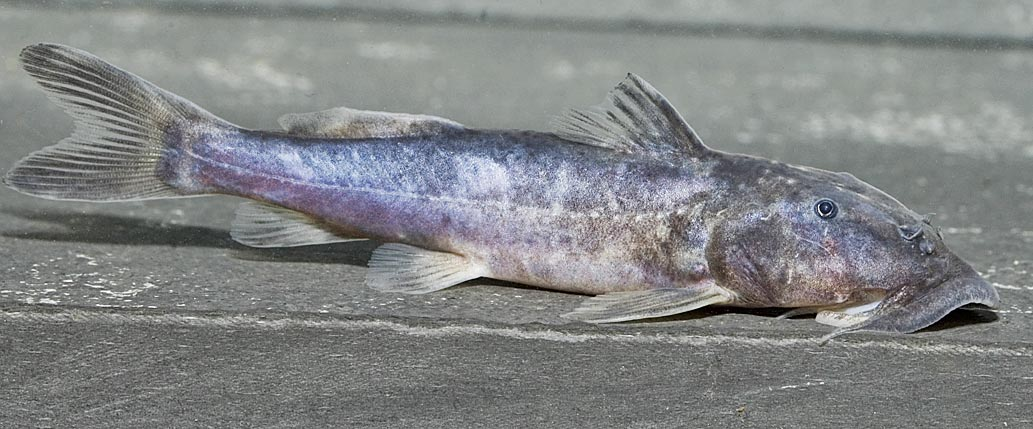
- Chiloglanis sp.

Scientific classification
- Kingdom: Animalia
- Phylum: Chordata
- Class: Actinopterygii
- Order: Siluriformes
- Family: Mochokidae
- Genus: Chiloglanis; W. K. H. Peters, 1868

Type species
- Chiloglanis deckenii Peters, 1868

= Chiloglanis =

Genus of fishes

Chiloglanis is a genus of upside-down catfishes native to Africa. These species have modified lips and barbels that form a suckermouth. They also have a naked (scaleless) body. Sexual dimorphism has been reported in Chiloglanis. The adult males of many of these species have elongate anal and caudal fins. Also, males may have an enlarged humeral process.

== Species ==
There are currently 70 recognized species in this genus:

- Chiloglanis angolensis Poll, 1967
- Chiloglanis anoterus R. S. Crass, 1960 (Pennant-tailed suckermouth)
- Chiloglanis asperocutis Mutizwa, Bragança & Chakona, 2025
- Chiloglanis asymetricaudalis De Vos, 1993
- Chiloglanis batesii Boulenger, 1904
- Chiloglanis benuensis Daget & Stauch, 1963
- Chiloglanis bifurcus R. A. Jubb & Le Roux, 1969 (Incomati suckermouth)
- Chiloglanis brevibarbis Boulenger, 1902 (Short-barbelled suckermouth)
- Chiloglanis camarabounyi Schmidt & Bart, 2017
- Chiloglanis cameronensis Boulenger, 1904
- Chiloglanis carnatus Mutizwa, Bragança & Chakona, 2024
- Chiloglanis carnosus T. R. Roberts & D. J. Stewart, 1976
- Chiloglanis compactus Mutizwa, Bragança & Chakona, 2025
- Chiloglanis congicus Boulenger, 1920
- Chiloglanis deckenii W. K. H. Peters, 1868 (Pangani suckermouth)
- Chiloglanis devosi R. C. Schmidt, H. L. Bart & Nyingi, 2015
- Chiloglanis dialloi Schmidt & Pezold, 2017
- Chiloglanis disneyi Trewavas, 1974
- Chiloglanis elisabethianus Boulenger, 1915
- Chiloglanis emarginatus R. A. Jubb & Le Roux, 1969 (Phongolo suckermouth)
- Chiloglanis fasciatus Pellegrin, 1936 (Okavango suckermouth)
- Chiloglanis fortuitus Schmidt, Bragança, and Tweddle, 2023
- Chiloglanis frodobagginsi Schmidt, Friel, Bart, and Pezold, 2023
- Chiloglanis harbinger T. R. Roberts, 1989
- Chiloglanis igamba Friel & Vigliotta, 2011
- Chiloglanis kabaensis Schmidt & Friel, 2017
- Chiloglanis kalambo Seegers, 1996 (Kalambo suckermouth)
- Chiloglanis kazumbei Friel & Vigliotta, 2011
- Chiloglanis kerioensis R. C. Schmidt, H. L. Bart & Nyingi, 2015
- Chiloglanis kinsuka Vigliotta, Friel & Stiassny, 2025
- Chiloglanis kolente Schmidt & Bart, 2017
- Chiloglanis lamottei Daget, 1948
- Chiloglanis loffabrevum Schmidt & Pezold, 2017
- Chiloglanis longibarbis Schmidt & Friel, 2017
- Chiloglanis lufirae Poll, 1976
- Chiloglanis lukugae Poll, 1944
- Chiloglanis macropterus Poll & D. J. Stewart, 1975
- Chiloglanis marlieri Poll, 1952
- Chiloglanis mbozi Seegers, 1996 (Mbozi suckermouth)
- Chiloglanis micropogon Poll, 1952
- Chiloglanis microps Matthes, 1965
- Chiloglanis modjensis Boulenger, 1904
- Chiloglanis mongoensis R. C. Schmidt & Barrientos, 2019
- Chiloglanis msirii Kashindye, Manda, Friel, Chakona & Vreven, 2021
- Chiloglanis neumanni Boulenger, 1911 (Neumann's suckermouth)
- Chiloglanis niger T. R. Roberts, 1989
- Chiloglanis niloticus Boulenger, 1900
- Chiloglanis normani Pellegrin, 1933
- Chiloglanis nzerekore Schmidt & Pezold, 2017
- Chiloglanis occidentalis Pellegrin, 1933
- Chiloglanis orthodontus Friel & Vigliotta, 2011
- Chiloglanis paratus R. S. Crass, 1960 (Saw-fin suckermouth)
- Chiloglanis pezoldi Schmidt & Bart, 2017
- Chiloglanis pojeri Poll, 1944
- Chiloglanis polyodon Norman, 1932
- Chiloglanis polypogon T. R. Roberts, 1989
- Chiloglanis pretoriae van der Horst, 1931 (Short-spine suckermouth)
- Chiloglanis productus H. H. Ng & R. M. Bailey, 2006
- Chiloglanis reticulatus T. R. Roberts, 1989
- Chiloglanis rukwaensis Seegers, 1996 (Lake Rukwa suckermouth)
- Chiloglanis ruziziensis De Vos, 1993
- Chiloglanis sanagaensis T. R. Roberts, 1989
- Chiloglanis sardinhai Ladiges & Voelker, 1961
- Chiloglanis somereni Whitehead, 1958 (Someren's suckermouth)
- Chiloglanis swierstrai van der Horst, 1931 (Lowveld suckermouth)
- Chiloglanis trilobatus Seegers, 1996 (Three-lobed suckermouth)
- Chiloglanis tweddlei Schmidt & Friel, 2017
- Chiloglanis voltae Daget & Stauch, 1963
- Chiloglanis wagenia Vigliotta, Friel & Stiassny, 2025
- Chiloglanis waterloti Daget, 1954
