= Chiloglanis lamottei =

Conservation status
- Vulnerable (IUCN 3.1)

Scientific classification
- Kingdom: Animalia
- Phylum: Chordata
- Class: Actinopterygii
- Order: Siluriformes
- Family: Mochokidae
- Genus: Chiloglanis
- Species: C. lamottei

Binomial name
- Chiloglanis lamottei Daget, 1948

Species of fish

Chiloglanis lamottei is a species of upside-down catfish native to Guinea, where it is found at Mount Nimba, and Côte d'Ivoire, where it occurs in the Cavally River. This species grows to a length of 5 centimetres (2.0 in) SL.
