= Chiloglanis devosi =

Conservation status
- Endangered (IUCN 3.1)

Scientific classification
- Kingdom: Animalia
- Phylum: Chordata
- Class: Actinopterygii
- Order: Siluriformes
- Family: Mochokidae
- Genus: Chiloglanis
- Species: C. devosi

Binomial name
- Chiloglanis devosi R. C. Schmidt, H. L. Bart & Nyingi, 2015

Species of catfish

Chiloglanis devosi is a species of catfish native to Africa, in particularly rivers in Kenya. The species was first described in 2015, alongside Chiloglanis kerioensis.

== Etymology ==
It was named after Luc De Vos, who had served as the director of the Ichthyology Section of the National Museums of Kenya.

== Description ==
Chiloglanis devosi is a small species of catfish, with a maximum standard length of 49.2 mm (1.94 in). The body is uniformly covered in small tubercles that are present in higher concentrations near the head. While the body is pinkish-brown in coloration, gold marks are present along the sides. The fins are yellow with brown markings.

Sexual dimorphism is present in the species, with females being larger than males. In addition, male C. devosi have anal fins that display elongated rays which can extend beyond the adipose fins.
