= Chiloglanis fortuitus =

Scientific classification
- Kingdom: Animalia
- Phylum: Chordata
- Class: Actinopterygii
- Order: Siluriformes
- Family: Mochokidae
- Genus: Chiloglanis
- Species: C. fortuitus

Binomial name
- Chiloglanis fortuitus Schmidt, Bragança, and Tweddle, 2023

Species of catfish

Chiloglanis fortuitus is a species of catfish native to West Africa, specifically rivers in Liberia. It was first described in 2023, alongside another species of Chiloglanis, Chiloglanis frodobagginsi.

== Description ==
Chiloglanis fortuitus has a maximum standard length of 35.0 mm, although this measurement was based on a single male specimen. Its oral disc is moderate in size, with the width being equal to the length in measurement.

C. fortuitus differs from all other species in Chiloglanis by possessing 18 mandibular teeth. The oral disc and barbels are cream-colored, while the body is dark brown with patches of light-brown marks.
