= Chiloglanis voltae =

Conservation status
- Least Concern (IUCN 3.1)

Scientific classification
- Kingdom: Animalia
- Phylum: Chordata
- Class: Actinopterygii
- Order: Siluriformes
- Family: Mochokidae
- Genus: Chiloglanis
- Species: C. voltae

Binomial name
- Chiloglanis voltae Daget & Stauch, 1963

Species of fish

Chiloglanis voltae is a species of upside-down catfish native to Burkina Faso, Cameroon, Ghana, Nigeria and Togo, where it occurs in the Volta and Bénoué River systems. This species grows to a length of 2.7 centimetres (1.1 in) TL.
