= Chiloglanis niger =

Conservation status
- Endangered (IUCN 3.1)

Scientific classification
- Kingdom: Animalia
- Phylum: Chordata
- Class: Actinopterygii
- Order: Siluriformes
- Family: Mochokidae
- Genus: Chiloglanis
- Species: C. niger

Binomial name
- Chiloglanis niger Roberts, 1989

Species of fish

Chiloglanis niger is a species of upside-down catfish endemic to Cameroon, where it occurs in the Niger River basin at Bamenda. This species grows to a length of 3.5 centimetres (1.4 in) SL.
