= Lowveld suckermouth =

Conservation status
- Least Concern (IUCN 3.1)

Scientific classification
- Kingdom: Animalia
- Phylum: Chordata
- Class: Actinopterygii
- Order: Siluriformes
- Family: Mochokidae
- Genus: Chiloglanis
- Species: C. swierstrai

Binomial name
- Chiloglanis swierstrai van der Horst, 1931

Synonyms
- Chiloglanis engiops Crass, 1960

Species of fish

The lowveld suckermouth or rock catlet, (Chiloglanis swierstrai) is a species of upside-down catfish native to Mozambique, South Africa, Eswatini and Zimbabwe where it occurs in the Limpopo, Pongola and Komati Rivers. This species grows to a length of 7 centimetres (2.8 in) SL.
