= Chiloglanis polypogon =

Conservation status
- Near Threatened (IUCN 3.1)

Scientific classification
- Kingdom: Animalia
- Phylum: Chordata
- Class: Actinopterygii
- Order: Siluriformes
- Family: Mochokidae
- Genus: Chiloglanis
- Species: C. polypogon

Binomial name
- Chiloglanis polypogon Roberts, 1989

Species of fish

Chiloglanis polypogon is a species of upside-down catfish endemic to Cameroon where it occurs in the Cross River. It may also occur in Nigeria. This species grows to a length of 5.5 centimetres (2.2 in) SL.
