= Synodontis punctifer =

Conservation status
- Least Concern (IUCN 3.1)

Scientific classification
- Domain: Eukaryota
- Kingdom: Animalia
- Phylum: Chordata
- Class: Actinopterygii
- Order: Siluriformes
- Family: Mochokidae
- Genus: Synodontis
- Species: S. punctifer

Binomial name
- Synodontis punctifer Daget, 1965

Species of fish

Synodontis punctifer is a species of upside-down catfish endemic to Ivory Coast where it occurs in the Nzo and Bandama Rivers. This species grows to a length of 26 centimetres (10 in) TL.
