= Chiloglanis reticulatus =

Conservation status
- Data Deficient (IUCN 3.1)

Scientific classification
- Kingdom: Animalia
- Phylum: Chordata
- Class: Actinopterygii
- Order: Siluriformes
- Family: Mochokidae
- Genus: Chiloglanis
- Species: C. reticulatus

Binomial name
- Chiloglanis reticulatus Roberts, 1989

Species of fish

Chiloglanis reticulatus is a species of upside-down catfish native to the Dja River system in Cameroon and the Luala and Lufu River drainages in the Democratic Republic of the Congo. This species grows to a length of 4.2 centimetres (1.7 in) SL.
