= Chiloglanis sanagaensis =

Conservation status
- Least Concern (IUCN 3.1)

Scientific classification
- Kingdom: Animalia
- Phylum: Chordata
- Class: Actinopterygii
- Order: Siluriformes
- Family: Mochokidae
- Genus: Chiloglanis
- Species: C. sanagaensis

Binomial name
- Chiloglanis sanagaensis Roberts, 1989

Species of fish

Chiloglanis sanagaensis is a species of upside-down catfish endemic to Cameroon where it is only found in the Sanaga River basin. This species grows to a length of 4.3 centimetres (1.7 in) SL.
