= Chiloglanis benuensis =

Conservation status
- Least Concern (IUCN 3.1)

Scientific classification
- Kingdom: Animalia
- Phylum: Chordata
- Class: Actinopterygii
- Order: Siluriformes
- Family: Mochokidae
- Genus: Chiloglanis
- Species: C. benuensis

Binomial name
- Chiloglanis benuensis Daget & Stauch, 1963

Species of fish

Chiloglanis benuensis is a species of upside-down catfish native to Cameroon and Nigeria where it occurs in the Niger, Bénoué and Chad River systems. This species grows to a length of 3.8 centimetres (1.5 in) TL.
