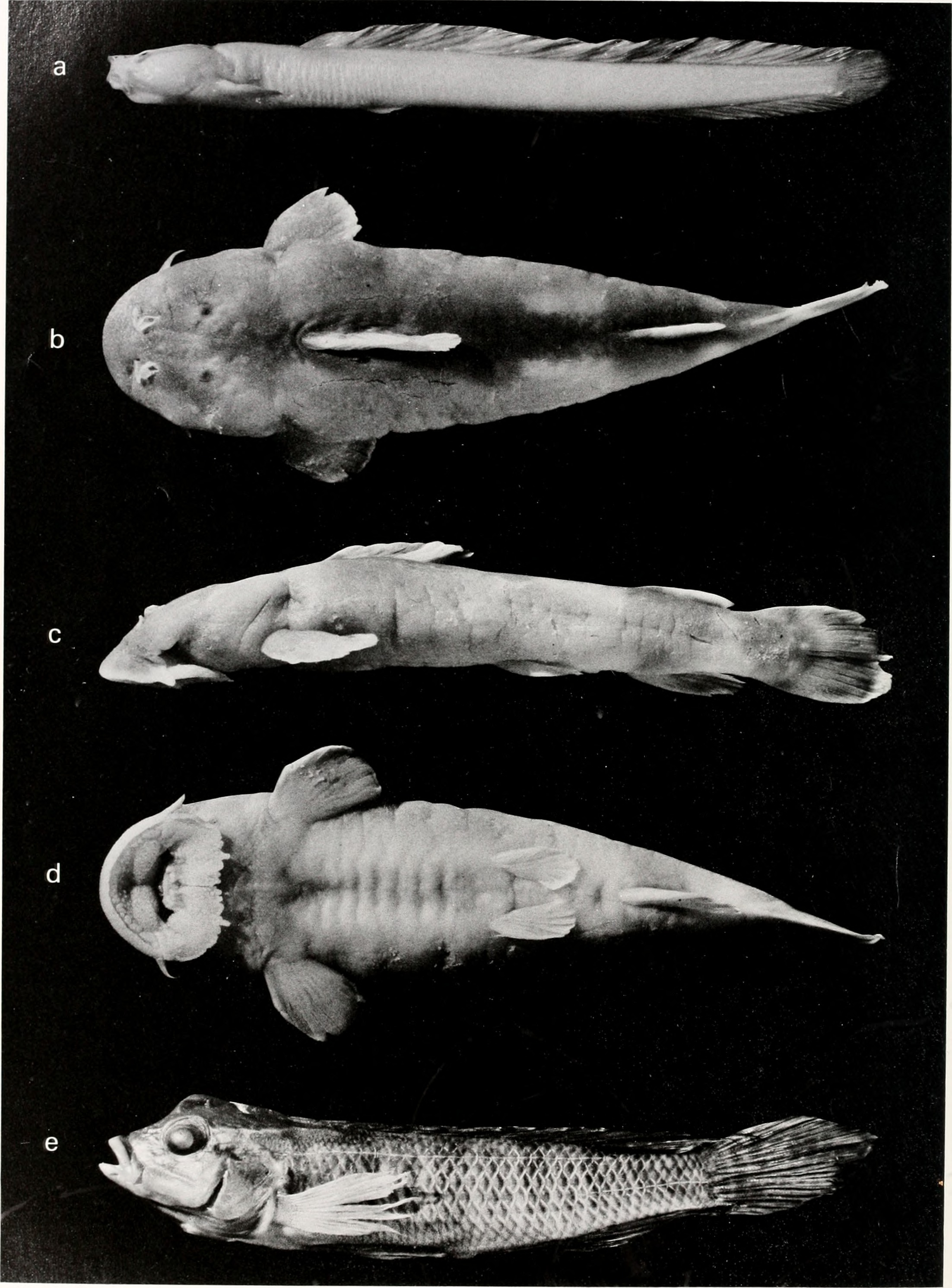

Conservation status
- Near Threatened (IUCN 3.1)

Scientific classification
- Kingdom: Animalia
- Phylum: Chordata
- Class: Actinopterygii
- Order: Siluriformes
- Family: Mochokidae
- Genus: Chiloglanis
- Species: C. carnosus

Binomial name
- Chiloglanis carnosus Roberts & Stewart, 1976

= Chiloglanis carnosus =

Species of fish

Chiloglanis carnosus is a species of upside-down catfish endemic to the Democratic Republic of the Congo where it occurs in rapids of the lower Congo River. This species grows to a length of 6.1 centimetres (2.4 in) TL.
