= Chiloglanis harbinger =

Conservation status
- Vulnerable (IUCN 3.1)

Scientific classification
- Kingdom: Animalia
- Phylum: Chordata
- Class: Actinopterygii
- Order: Siluriformes
- Family: Mochokidae
- Genus: Chiloglanis
- Species: C. harbinger

Binomial name
- Chiloglanis harbinger Roberts, 1989

Species of fish

Chiloglanis harbinger is a species of upside-down catfish endemic to Cameroon where it is found in the Lokunje River basin. This species grows to a length of 4.4 centimetres (1.7 in) SL.
