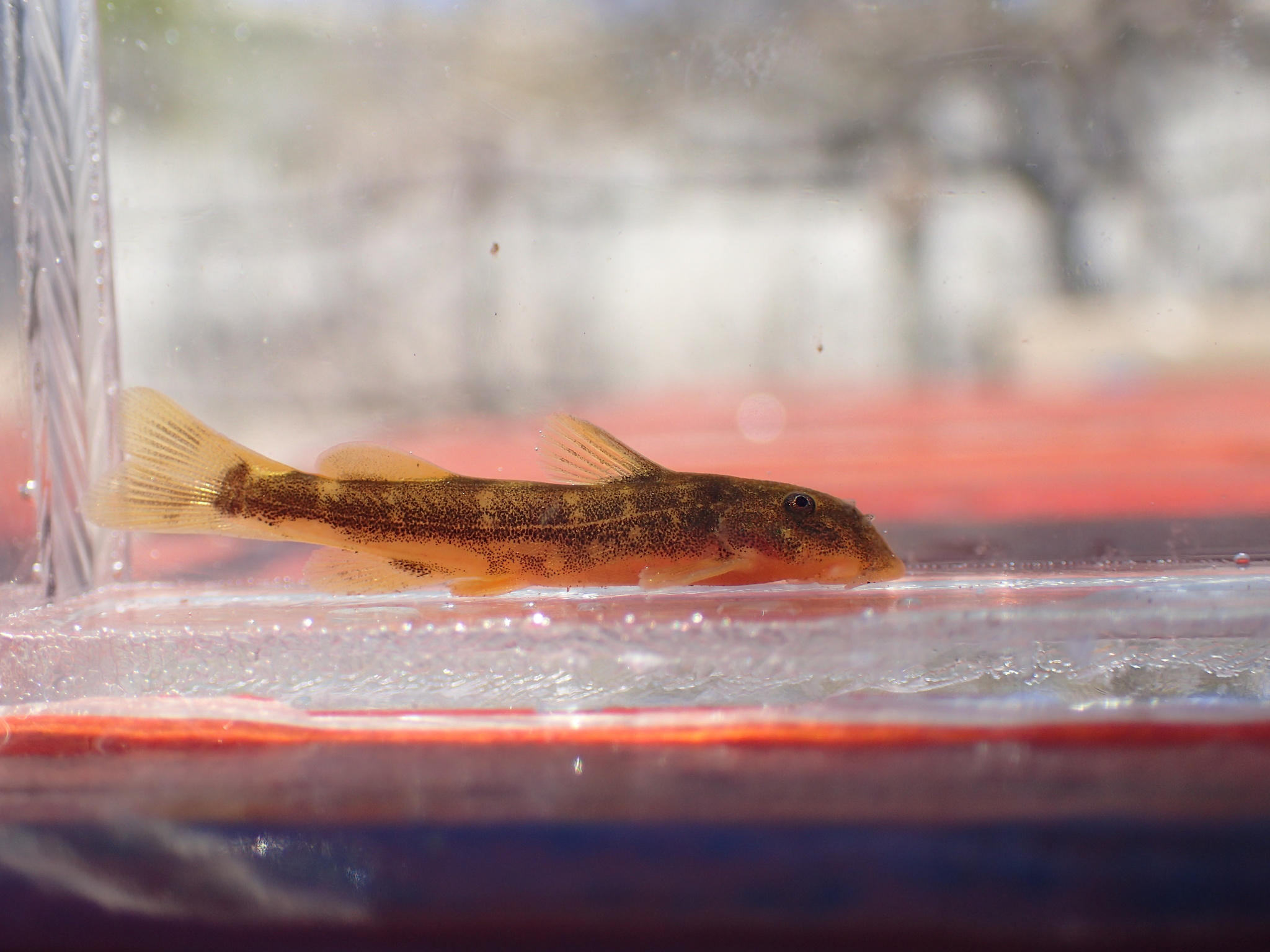

Conservation status
- Least Concern (IUCN 3.1)

Scientific classification
- Kingdom: Animalia
- Phylum: Chordata
- Class: Actinopterygii
- Order: Siluriformes
- Family: Mochokidae
- Genus: Chiloglanis
- Species: C. pretoriae

Binomial name
- Chiloglanis pretoriae van der Horst, 1931

= Chiloglanis pretoriae =

Species of fish

Chiloglanis pretoriae, the shortspine suckermouth, is a species of upside-down catfish native to Eswatini, Mozambique, South Africa and Zimbabwe, occurring in the Limpopo, Komati, Zambezi, Pungwe and Buzi River systems. It grows to 6.5 centimetres (2.6 in) in standard length.
