= Chiloglanis ruziziensis =

Conservation status
- Critically Endangered (IUCN 3.1)

Scientific classification
- Kingdom: Animalia
- Phylum: Chordata
- Class: Actinopterygii
- Order: Siluriformes
- Family: Mochokidae
- Genus: Chiloglanis
- Species: C. ruziziensis

Binomial name
- Chiloglanis ruziziensis De Vos, 1993

Species of fish

Chiloglanis ruziziensis is a species of upside-down catfish native to Burundi, the Democratic Republic of the Congo and Rwanda where it occurs in the Ruzizi River. This species grows to a length of 6.3 centimetres (2.5 in) SL.
