= Chiloglanis asymetricaudalis =

Conservation status
- Endangered (IUCN 3.1)

Scientific classification
- Kingdom: Animalia
- Phylum: Chordata
- Class: Actinopterygii
- Order: Siluriformes
- Family: Mochokidae
- Genus: Chiloglanis
- Species: C. asymetricaudalis

Binomial name
- Chiloglanis asymetricaudalis De Vos, 1993

Species of fish

Chiloglanis asymetricaudalis is a species of upside-down catfish native to Burundi, the Democratic Republic of the Congo, Rwanda and Tanzania where it can be found in the Rusizi and Luiche Rivers. This species grows to a length of 76 centimetres (30 in) SL.
