= Chiloglanis polyodon =

Conservation status
- Endangered (IUCN 3.1)

Scientific classification
- Kingdom: Animalia
- Phylum: Chordata
- Class: Actinopterygii
- Order: Siluriformes
- Family: Mochokidae
- Genus: Chiloglanis
- Species: C. polyodon

Binomial name
- Chiloglanis polyodon Norman, 1932

Species of fish

Chiloglanis polyodon is a species of upside-down catfish endemic to Sierra Leone where it is only known from the headwaters of the Bagbwe River. This species grows to a length of 5.2 centimetres (2.0 in) TL.
