= Chiloglanis occidentalis =

Conservation status
- Least Concern (IUCN 3.1)

Scientific classification
- Kingdom: Animalia
- Phylum: Chordata
- Class: Actinopterygii
- Order: Siluriformes
- Family: Mochokidae
- Genus: Chiloglanis
- Species: C. occidentalis

Binomial name
- Chiloglanis occidentalis Pellegrin, 1933

Species of fish

Chiloglanis occidentalis is a species of upside-down catfish that is native to western Africa. This species grows to a length of 6.2 centimetres (2.4 in) TL.
