= Chiloglanis productus =

Scientific classification
- Domain: Eukaryota
- Kingdom: Animalia
- Phylum: Chordata
- Class: Actinopterygii
- Order: Siluriformes
- Family: Mochokidae
- Genus: Chiloglanis
- Species: C. productus

Binomial name
- Chiloglanis productus Ng & Bailey, 2006

Species of fish

Chiloglanis productus is a species of upside-down catfish endemic to Zambia, where it is found in the Lunzua and Lufubu Rivers. This species grows to a length of 4.9 centimetres (1.9 in) SL.
