= Chiloglanis fasciatus =

Conservation status
- Least Concern (IUCN 3.1)

Scientific classification
- Kingdom: Animalia
- Phylum: Chordata
- Class: Actinopterygii
- Order: Siluriformes
- Family: Mochokidae
- Genus: Chiloglanis
- Species: C. fasciatus

Binomial name
- Chiloglanis fasciatus Pellegrin, 1936

Species of fish

Chiloglanis fasciatus, the Okavango suckermouth, is a species of upside-down catfish native to Angola, Botswana and Namibia where it is found in the Kwando River and the Okavango River and Delta. This species grows to a length of 6.4 centimetres (2.5 in) TL.
