= Synodontis violaceus =

Conservation status
- Least Concern (IUCN 3.1)

Scientific classification
- Domain: Eukaryota
- Kingdom: Animalia
- Phylum: Chordata
- Class: Actinopterygii
- Order: Siluriformes
- Family: Mochokidae
- Genus: Synodontis
- Species: S. violaceus

Binomial name
- Synodontis violaceus Pellegrin, 1919

Species of fish

Synodontis violaceus is a species of upside-down catfish found in the Chad, Niger, Senegal and Volta basins. This species grows to a length of 30 centimetres (12 in) SL.
