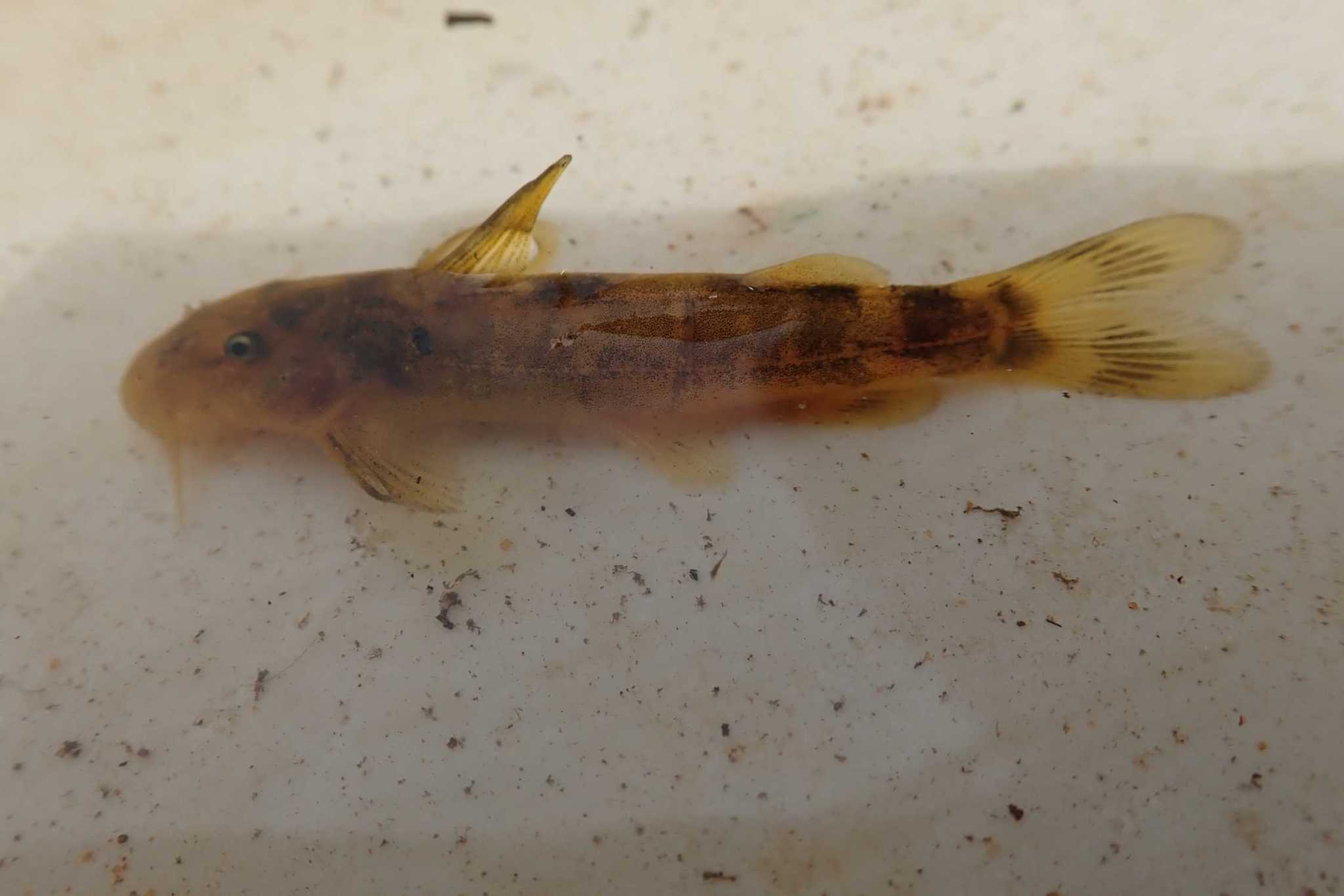

Conservation status
- Critically Endangered (IUCN 3.1)

Scientific classification
- Kingdom: Animalia
- Phylum: Chordata
- Class: Actinopterygii
- Order: Siluriformes
- Family: Mochokidae
- Genus: Chiloglanis
- Species: C. bifurcus

Binomial name
- Chiloglanis bifurcus Jubb & Le Roux, 1969

= Incomati rock catlet =

Species of fish

The Incomati rock catlet or Incomati suckermouth (Chiloglanis bifurcus) is a species of upside-down catfish native to Mozambique, South Africa and Eswatini where it is only found in the Crocodile-Incomati River system. This species grows to a length of 6.8 centimetres (2.7 in) SL.
