= Chiloglanis angolensis =

Conservation status
- Data Deficient (IUCN 3.1)

Scientific classification
- Kingdom: Animalia
- Phylum: Chordata
- Class: Actinopterygii
- Order: Siluriformes
- Family: Mochokidae
- Genus: Chiloglanis
- Species: C. angolensis

Binomial name
- Chiloglanis angolensis Poll, 1967

Species of fish

Chiloglanis angolensis is a species of upside-down catfish endemic to Angola where it occurs in the Cuango River and the Rio Coroca. This species grows to a length of 5.6 centimetres (2.2 in) SL.
