= Chiloglanis frodobagginsi =

Scientific classification
- Kingdom: Animalia
- Phylum: Chordata
- Class: Actinopterygii
- Order: Siluriformes
- Family: Mochokidae
- Genus: Chiloglanis
- Species: C. frodobagginsi

Binomial name
- Chiloglanis frodobagginsi Schmidt, Friel, Bart, and Pezold, 2023

Species of suckermouth catfish

Chiloglanis frodobagginsi is a species of catfish native to West Africa, in particular the upper Niger River. First described in 2023, it was initially mistaken for its sister species, Chiloglanis micropogon.

== Etymology ==
Chiloglanis frodobagginsi was named after Frodo Baggins, a fictional character that appears in the English novel J. R. R. Tolkien's fantasy novel The Lord of the Rings and other related media.

== Description ==
Chiloglanis frodobagginsi is a small species of Chiloglanis with a maximum standard length of 38.1 mm. The species exhibits sexual dimorphism, specifically in the urogenital papilla, in which those of males are elongated while female papillae are reduced. Tubercles are present, with higher concentrations near the head. These tubercles are white, while the body is medium-brown with light-brown marks.

C. frodobagginsi possesses very reduced mandibular barbels on its oral disc, making it able to be distinguished from other known species of Chiloglanis. The oral disc is formed by the unification of its upper and lower lips. Unlike its sister species, Chiloglanis micropogon, C. frodobagginsi has fewer premaxillay teeth, which are located in three rows instead of four.
