= Chiloglanis lufirae =

Conservation status
- Data Deficient (IUCN 3.1)

Scientific classification
- Kingdom: Animalia
- Phylum: Chordata
- Class: Actinopterygii
- Order: Siluriformes
- Family: Mochokidae
- Genus: Chiloglanis
- Species: C. lufirae

Binomial name
- Chiloglanis lufirae Poll, 1976

Species of fish

Chiloglanis lufirae is a species of upside-down catfish endemic to the Democratic Republic of the Congo where it is found in the Lufira River drainage. This species grows to a length of 10 centimetres (3.9 in) SL.
