= Chiloglanis pojeri =

Conservation status
- Least Concern (IUCN 3.1)

Scientific classification
- Kingdom: Animalia
- Phylum: Chordata
- Class: Actinopterygii
- Order: Siluriformes
- Family: Mochokidae
- Genus: Chiloglanis
- Species: C. pojeri

Binomial name
- Chiloglanis pojeri Poll, 1944

Species of fish

Chiloglanis pojeri is a species of upside-down catfish native to the Democratic Republic of the Congo where it occurs in the Lualaba River drainages and to Tanzania where it can be found in the Lake Tanganyika basin. This species grows to a length of 7 centimetres (2.8 in) TL.
