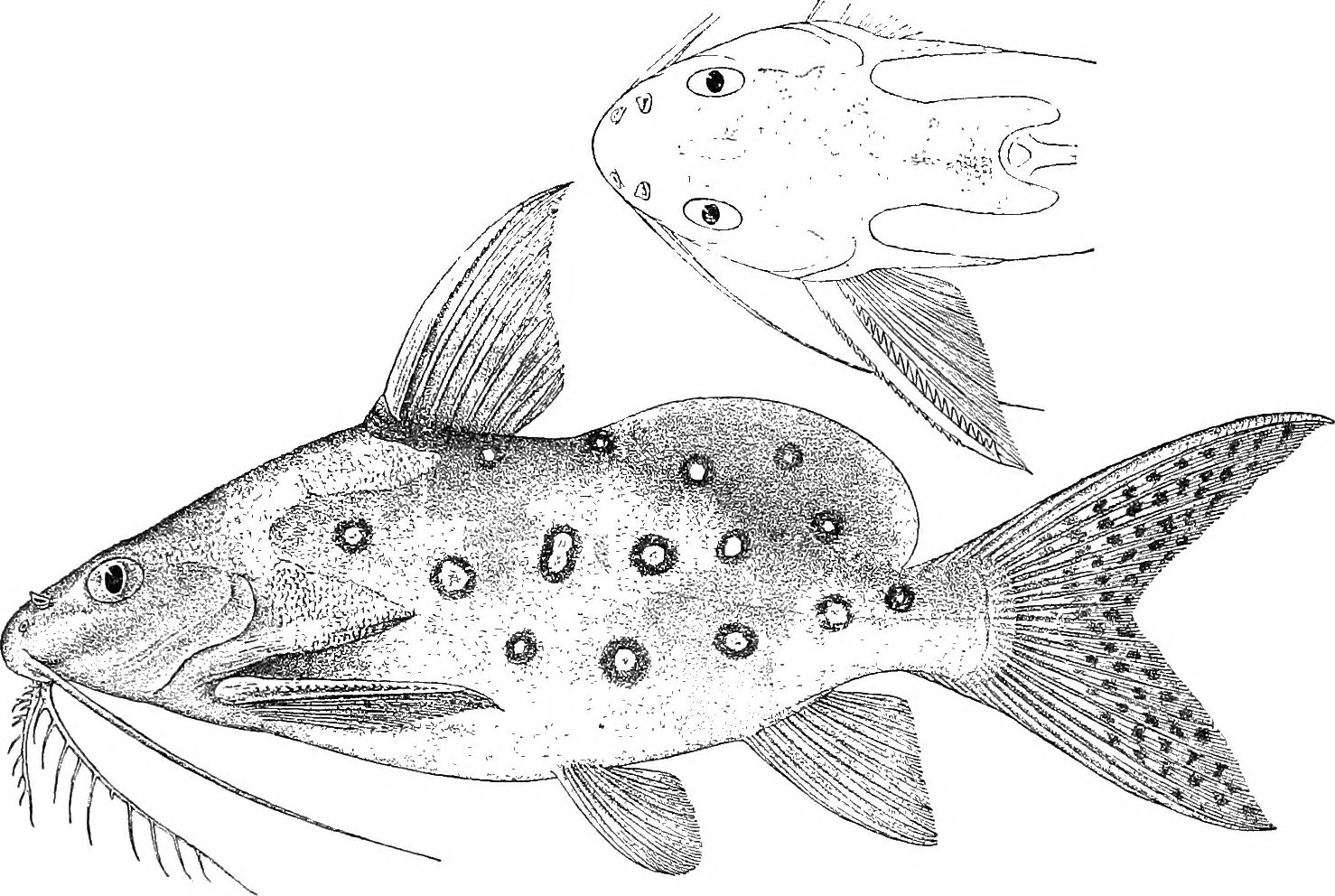

Conservation status
- Least Concern (IUCN 3.1)

Scientific classification
- Kingdom: Animalia
- Phylum: Chordata
- Class: Actinopterygii
- Order: Siluriformes
- Family: Mochokidae
- Genus: Synodontis
- Species: S. ocellifer

Binomial name
- Synodontis ocellifer Boulenger, 1900

= Synodontis ocellifer =

Species of fish

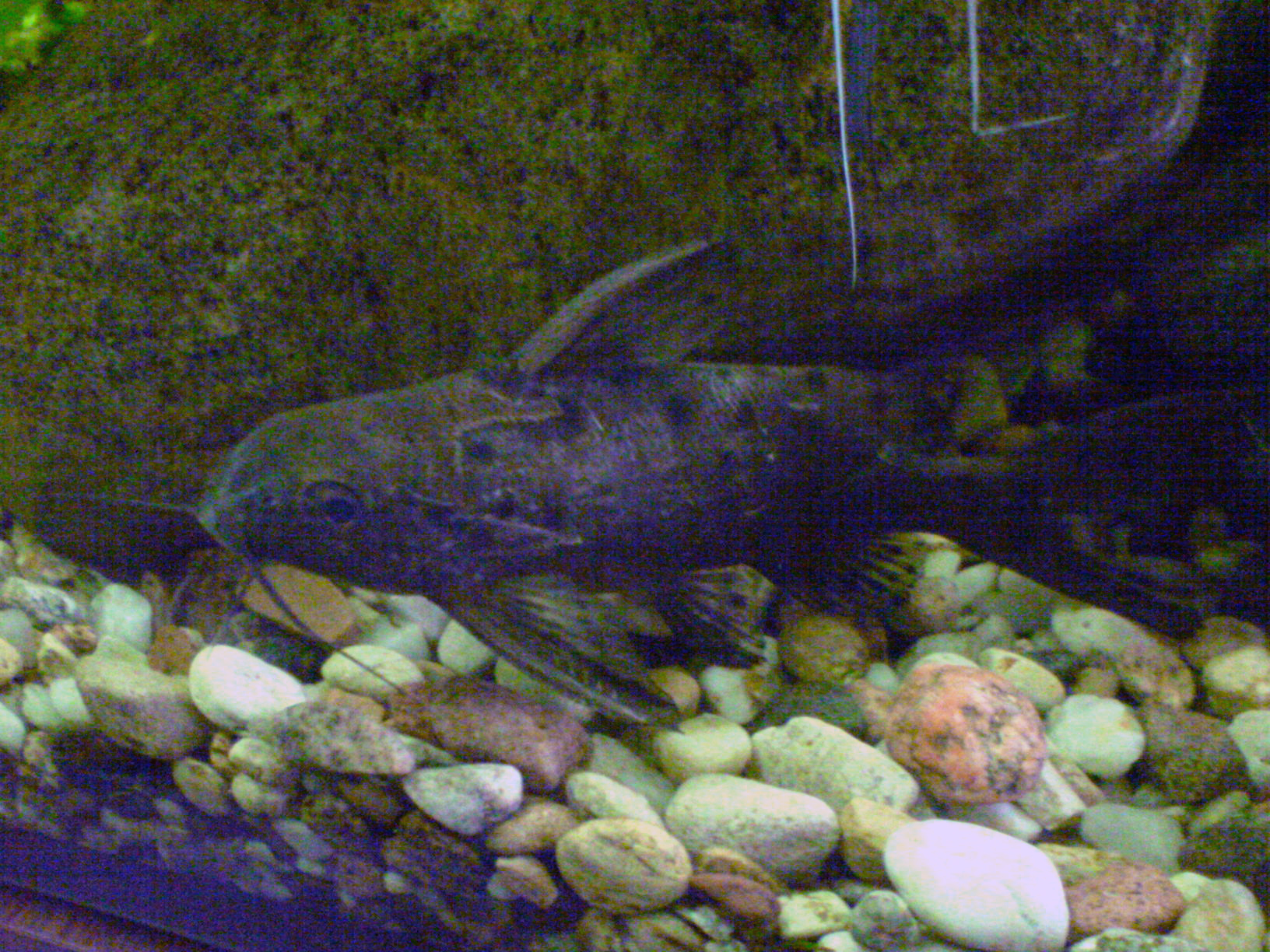
Synodontis ocellifer in an aquarium

Synodontis ocellifer, known as the ocellated synodontis, is a species of upside-down catfish native to the rivers of northern and western Africa. It has been reported in 10 countries, including Burkina Faso, Cameroon, Chad, Gambia, Ghana, Guinea, Mali, Niger, Nigeria, and Senegal. It was first described by Belgian-British zoologist George Albert Boulenger in 1900, from specimens collected in Kunchow Creek, in Gambia. The species name ocellifer comes from the Latin word ocellus, meaning "eye", and the Latin word ifer, meaning "to carry", which refers to the black spots, possibly with white centers found on the sides.

== Description ==
Like all members of the genus Synodontis, S. ocellifer has a strong, bony head capsule that extends back as far as the first spine of the dorsal fin. The head contains a distinct narrow, bony, external protrusion called a humeral process. The shape and size of the humeral process helps to identify the species. In S. ocellifer, the humeral process is long, narrow, and sharply pointed.

The fish has three pairs of barbels. The maxillary barbels are on located on the upper jaw, and two pairs of mandibular barbels are on the lower jaw. The maxillary barbel is straight without any branches, and has a thin membrane at the base. It extends 1 1/2 to 1 3/4 the length of the head. The outer pair of mandibular barbels is about twice the length of the inner pair, and both have long, slender branches.

The front edges of the dorsal fins and the pectoral fins of Syntontis species are hardened into stiff spines. In S. ocellifer, the spine of the dorsal fin is short, a little shorter than the head, smooth in the front and serrated on the back, and curved. The remaining portion of the dorsal fin is made up of seven branching rays. The spine of the pectoral fin about as long as the head, and serrated on both sides. The adipose fin is 4 to 5 times as long as it is deep. The anal fin contains four unbranched and seven to eight branched rays. The tail, or caudal fin, is deeply forked, with the upper lobe the longer of the two.

All members of Syndontis have a structure called a premaxillary toothpad, which is located on the very front of the upper jaw of the mouth. This structure contains several rows of short, chisel-shaped teeth. In S. ocellifer, the toothpad forms a short and broad band. On the lower jaw, or mandible, the teeth of Syndontis are attached to flexible, stalk-like structures and described as "s-shaped" or "hooked". The number of teeth on the mandible is used to differentiate between species; in S. ocellifer, there are 20 to 30 teeth on the mandible.

The body color is a grey-brown on the back and on the sides, with a white underside. The body and adipose fin show large black and white spots that are either solid black or a black ring on a white background.

The maximum total length of the species is 49 centimetres (19 in). Generally, females in the genus Synodontis tend to be slightly larger than males of the same age.

== Habitat and behavior ==
In the wild, the species has been found in the basins of the Chad River, Niger River, Volta River, Senegal River, and the Gambia River. The reproductive habits of most of the species of Synodontis are not known, beyond some instances of obtaining egg counts from gravid females. Spawning likely occurs during the flooding season between July and October, and pairs swim in unison during spawning. As a whole, species of Synodontis are omnivores, consuming insect larvae, algae, gastropods, bivalves, sponges, crustaceans, and the eggs of other fishes. The growth rate is rapid in the first year, then slows down as the fish age.
