= Chiloglanis sardinhai =

Conservation status
- Least Concern (IUCN 3.1)

Scientific classification
- Kingdom: Animalia
- Phylum: Chordata
- Class: Actinopterygii
- Order: Siluriformes
- Family: Mochokidae
- Genus: Chiloglanis
- Species: C. sardinhai

Binomial name
- Chiloglanis sardinhai Ladiges & Voelker, 1961

Species of fish

Chiloglanis sardinhai is a species of upside-down catfish endemic to Angola where it is found only in Cuanza Sul Province.

This species grows to a length of 3.9 centimetres (1.5 in) SL.
