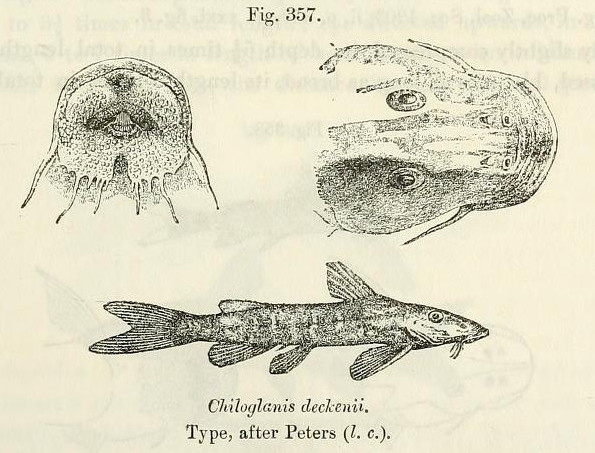

Conservation status
- Least Concern (IUCN 3.1)

Scientific classification
- Kingdom: Animalia
- Phylum: Chordata
- Class: Actinopterygii
- Order: Siluriformes
- Family: Mochokidae
- Genus: Chiloglanis
- Species: C. deckenii

Binomial name
- Chiloglanis deckenii Peters, 1868

Synonyms
- Synodontis eurystomus Pfeffer, 1889

= Pangani suckermouth =

Species of fish

The Pangani suckermouth (Chiloglanis deckenii) is a species of upside-down catfish native to Kenya and Tanzania. This species grows to a length of 7 centimetres (2.8 in) SL.

== Distribution ==
It is found in the Mtera Dam, Kidatu Dam, Lake Jipe, the Pangani River, Rufiji River and Ruaha River.
