= Chiloglanis kazumbei =

Scientific classification
- Kingdom: Animalia
- Phylum: Chordata
- Class: Actinopterygii
- Order: Siluriformes
- Family: Mochokidae
- Genus: Chiloglanis
- Species: C. kazumbei

Binomial name
- Chiloglanis kazumbei Friel & Vigliotta, 2011

Species of fish

Chiloglanis kazumbei is a species of upside-down catfish found in Tanzania, where it occurs in the lower Malagarasi River and the Luiche River; it has also been seen in affluents of Malagarazi in Burundi. This species grows to a length of 5.4 centimetres (2.1 in) SL.
