= Mochokus niloticus =

Conservation status
- Least Concern (IUCN 3.1)

Scientific classification
- Domain: Eukaryota
- Kingdom: Animalia
- Phylum: Chordata
- Class: Actinopterygii
- Order: Siluriformes
- Family: Mochokidae
- Genus: Mochokus
- Species: M. niloticus

Binomial name
- Mochokus niloticus Joannis, 1835

Species of fish

Mochokus niloticus is a species of upside-down catfish native to the Nile and Niger River basins. This species grows to a length of 6.5 centimetres (2.6 in) TL.
