= Chiloglanis somereni =

Conservation status
- Least Concern (IUCN 3.1)

Scientific classification
- Kingdom: Animalia
- Phylum: Chordata
- Class: Actinopterygii
- Order: Siluriformes
- Family: Mochokidae
- Genus: Chiloglanis
- Species: C. somereni

Binomial name
- Chiloglanis somereni Whitehead, 1958

Species of fish

Chiloglanis somereni, Someren's suckermouth, is a species of upside-down catfish native to Kenya and Tanzania where it is found in rivers around Lake Victoria. This species grows to a length of 10 centimetres (3.9 in) SL.
