= Chiloglanis orthodontus =

Scientific classification
- Kingdom: Animalia
- Phylum: Chordata
- Class: Actinopterygii
- Order: Siluriformes
- Family: Mochokidae
- Genus: Chiloglanis
- Species: C. orthodontus

Binomial name
- Chiloglanis orthodontus Friel & Vigliotta, 2011

Species of fish

Chiloglanis orthodontus is a species of upside-down catfish that occurs in several greatly separated sites in the lower Malagarasi River in Tanzania, and is likely endemic to the basin. This species grows to a length of 2.9 centimetres (1.1 in) SL.
