= Chiloglanis macropterus =

Conservation status
- Vulnerable (IUCN 3.1)

Scientific classification
- Kingdom: Animalia
- Phylum: Chordata
- Class: Actinopterygii
- Order: Siluriformes
- Family: Mochokidae
- Genus: Chiloglanis
- Species: C. macropterus

Binomial name
- Chiloglanis macropterus Poll & Stewart, 1975

Species of fish

Chiloglanis macropterus is a species of upside-down catfish endemic to Zambia where it occurs in the Luongo River. This species grows to a length of 9.8 centimetres (3.9 in) TL.
