= Mbozi suckermouth =

Conservation status
- Vulnerable (IUCN 3.1)

Scientific classification
- Kingdom: Animalia
- Phylum: Chordata
- Class: Actinopterygii
- Order: Siluriformes
- Family: Mochokidae
- Genus: Chiloglanis
- Species: C. mbozi

Binomial name
- Chiloglanis mbozi Seegers, 1996

Species of fish

The mbozi suckermouth (Chiloglanis mbozi) is a species of upside-down catfish endemic to Tanzania where it occurs in the Lake Rukwa drainage. This species grows to a length of 5.7 centimetres (2.2 in) TL.
