= Chiloglanis lukugae =

Conservation status
- Least Concern (IUCN 3.1)

Scientific classification
- Kingdom: Animalia
- Phylum: Chordata
- Class: Actinopterygii
- Order: Siluriformes
- Family: Mochokidae
- Genus: Chiloglanis
- Species: C. lukugae

Binomial name
- Chiloglanis lukugae Poll, 1944

Species of fish

Chiloglanis lukugae is a species of upside-down catfish endemic to the Democratic Republic of the Congo where it is found in the Luvua River drainage. Reports from other locations need confirmation. This species grows to a length of 9 centimetres (3.5 in) SL.
