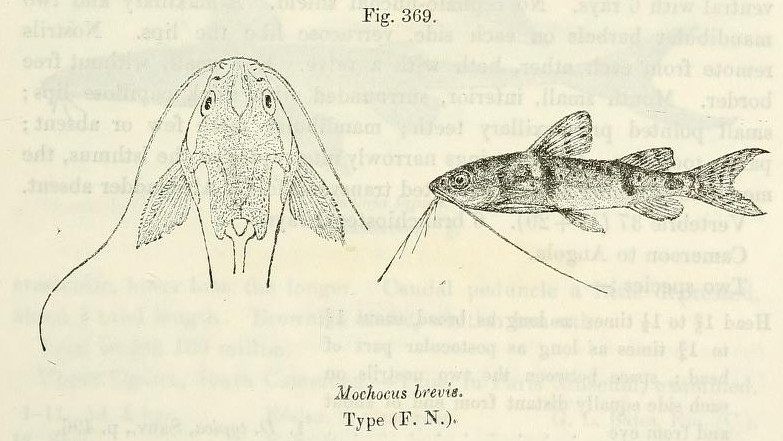

Conservation status
- Data Deficient (IUCN 3.1)

Scientific classification
- Kingdom: Animalia
- Phylum: Chordata
- Class: Actinopterygii
- Order: Siluriformes
- Family: Mochokidae
- Genus: Mochokus
- Species: M. brevis

Binomial name
- Mochokus brevis Boulenger, 1906

= Mochokus brevis =

Species of fish

Mochokus brevis is a species of upside-down catfish native to the Nile and Chad Basins. This species grows to a length of 3.1 centimetres (1.2 in) TL.
