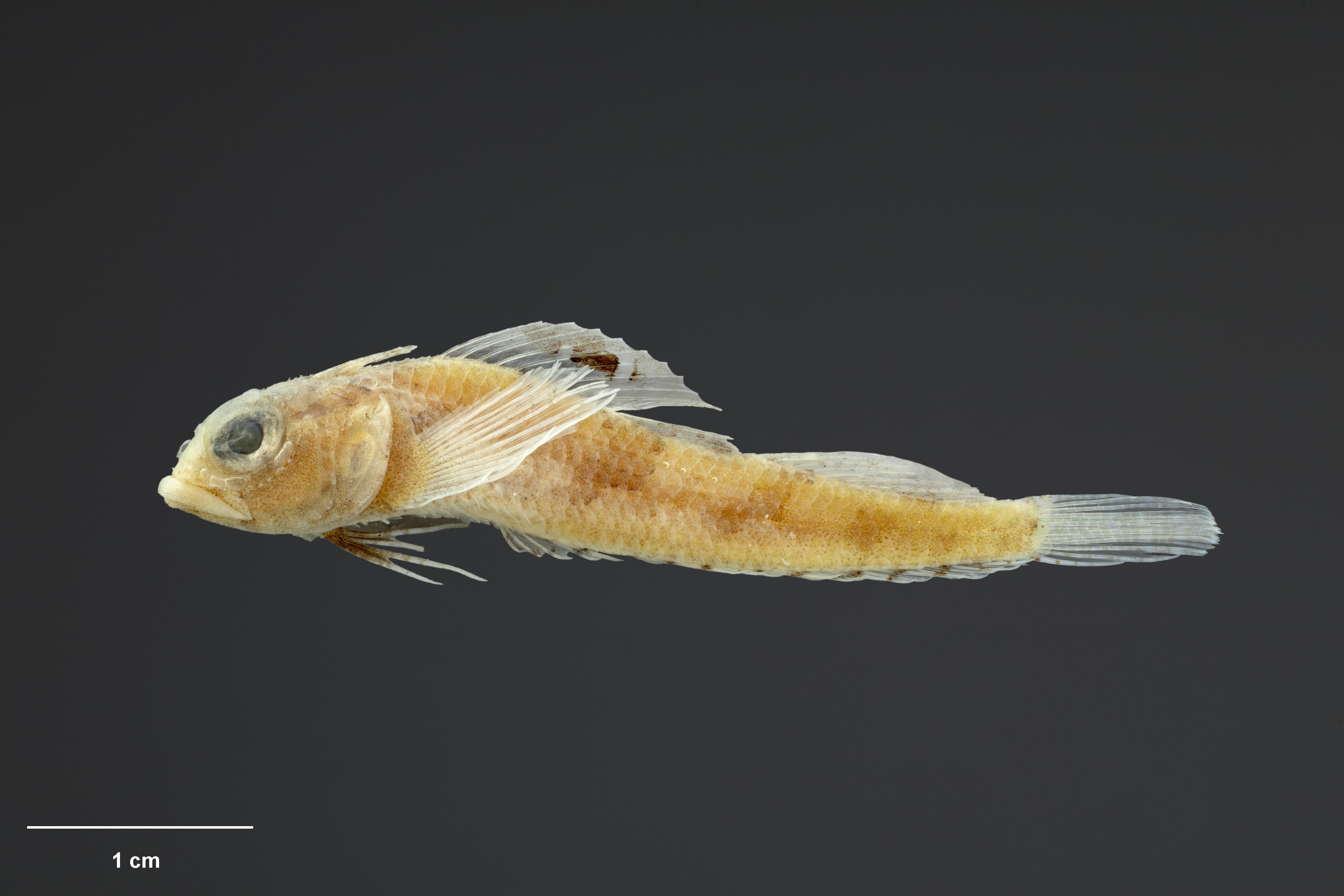
- Type specimen in Te Papa

Conservation status
- Least Concern (IUCN 3.1)

Scientific classification
- Kingdom: Animalia
- Phylum: Chordata
- Class: Actinopterygii
- Order: Blenniiformes
- Family: Tripterygiidae
- Genus: Apopterygion
- Species: A. oculus

Binomial name
- Apopterygion oculus Fricke & Roberts, 1994

= Apopterygion oculus =

Ocellate triplefin

Species of fish

Apopterygion oculus, the ocellate triplefin, is a threefin blenny of the family Tripterygiidae, found around the coast of New Zealand at depths of between 14 and 186 m in reef areas of broken rock and shellgrit. Its length is up to 6.3 cm.
