= Three-lobed suckermouth =

Conservation status
- Least Concern (IUCN 3.1)

Scientific classification
- Kingdom: Animalia
- Phylum: Chordata
- Class: Actinopterygii
- Order: Siluriformes
- Family: Mochokidae
- Genus: Chiloglanis
- Species: C. trilobatus

Binomial name
- Chiloglanis trilobatus Seegers, 1996

Species of fish

The three-lobed suckermouth (Chiloglanis trilobatus) is a species of upside-down catfish native to the Lake Rukwa drainage of Tanzania and Zambia. This species grows to a length of 5.2 centimetres (2.0 in) TL.
