= Chiloglanis paratus =

Conservation status
- Least Concern (IUCN 3.1)

Scientific classification
- Kingdom: Animalia
- Phylum: Chordata
- Class: Actinopterygii
- Order: Siluriformes
- Family: Mochokidae
- Genus: Chiloglanis
- Species: C. paratus

Binomial name
- Chiloglanis paratus Crass, 1960

Species of fish

Chiloglanis paratus, the sawfin suckermouth, is a species of upside-down catfish native to Eswatini Mozambique, South Africa and Zimbabwe where it is found in the Pongolo, Incomati and Limpopo River systems. This species grows to a length of 8.5 centimetres (3.3 in) SL.
