= Chiloglanis elisabethianus =

Conservation status
- Vulnerable (IUCN 3.1)

Scientific classification
- Kingdom: Animalia
- Phylum: Chordata
- Class: Actinopterygii
- Order: Siluriformes
- Family: Mochokidae
- Genus: Chiloglanis
- Species: C. elisabethianus

Binomial name
- Chiloglanis elisabethianus Boulenger, 1915

Species of fish

Chiloglanis elisabethianus is a species of upside-down catfish endemic to the Democratic Republic of the Congo where it occurs in the rivers of Katanga (province). This species grows to a length of 5.2 centimetres (2.0 in) TL.
