= Chiloglanis microps =

Conservation status
- Least Concern (IUCN 3.1)

Scientific classification
- Kingdom: Animalia
- Phylum: Chordata
- Class: Actinopterygii
- Order: Siluriformes
- Family: Mochokidae
- Genus: Chiloglanis
- Species: C. microps

Binomial name
- Chiloglanis microps Matthes, 1965

Species of fish

Chiloglanis microps is a species of upside-down catfish endemic to the Democratic Republic of the Congo where it occurs in the Lufira River system. This species grows to a length of 5.6 centimetres (2.2 in) SL.
