= Lake Rukwa suckermouth =

Conservation status
- Vulnerable (IUCN 3.1)

Scientific classification
- Kingdom: Animalia
- Phylum: Chordata
- Class: Actinopterygii
- Order: Siluriformes
- Family: Mochokidae
- Genus: Chiloglanis
- Species: C. rukwaensis

Binomial name
- Chiloglanis rukwaensis Seegers, 1996

Species of fish

The Lake Rukwa suckermouth (Chiloglanis rukwaensis) is a species of upside-down catfish native to Tanzania and Zambia where it is found in the Lake Rukwa drainage. This species grows to a length of 4.8 centimetres (1.9 in) TL.
