= Synodontis matthesi =

Conservation status
- Least Concern (IUCN 3.1)

Scientific classification
- Kingdom: Animalia
- Phylum: Chordata
- Class: Actinopterygii
- Order: Siluriformes
- Family: Mochokidae
- Genus: Synodontis
- Species: S. matthesi

Binomial name
- Synodontis matthesi Poll, 1971

Species of fish

Synodontis matthesi is a species of upside-down catfish endemic to Tanzania where it occurs in the Rufiji River basin. This species grows to a length of 30 centimetres (12 in) TL.
