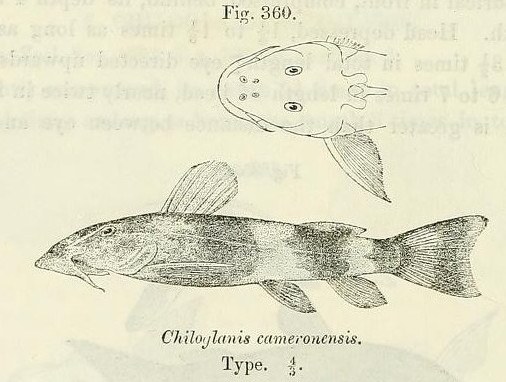

Conservation status
- Least Concern (IUCN 3.1)

Scientific classification
- Kingdom: Animalia
- Phylum: Chordata
- Class: Actinopterygii
- Order: Siluriformes
- Family: Mochokidae
- Genus: Chiloglanis
- Species: C. cameronensis

Binomial name
- Chiloglanis cameronensis Boulenger, 1904

= Chiloglanis cameronensis =

Species of fish

Chiloglanis cameronensis is a species of upside-down catfish native to Cameroon, Equatorial Guinea and Gabon where they are found in the coastal rivers. This species grows to a length of 5.5 centimetres (2.2 in) TL.
