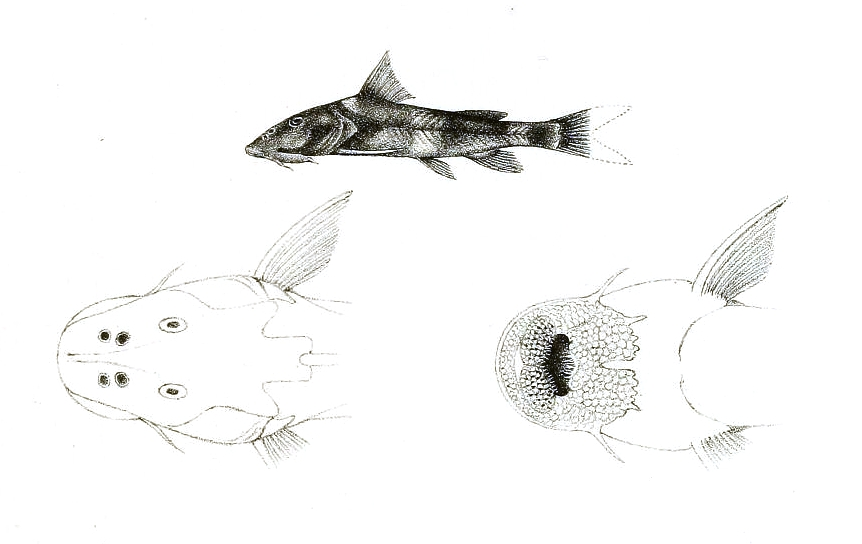

Conservation status
- Data Deficient (IUCN 3.1)

Scientific classification
- Kingdom: Animalia
- Phylum: Chordata
- Class: Actinopterygii
- Order: Siluriformes
- Family: Mochokidae
- Genus: Chiloglanis
- Species: C. modjensis

Binomial name
- Chiloglanis modjensis Boulenger, 1904

= Chiloglanis modjensis =

Species of fish

Chiloglanis modjensis is a species of upside-down catfish (Mochokidae) endemic to Ethiopia. This species grows to a length of 4 centimetres (1.6 in) SL.
