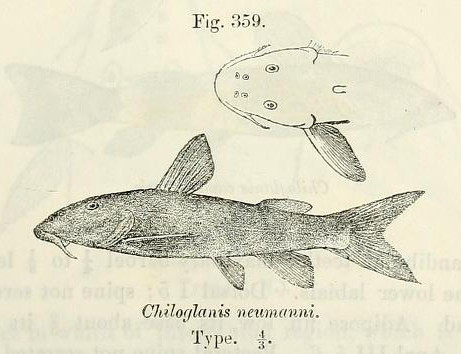

Conservation status
- Data Deficient (IUCN 3.1)

Scientific classification
- Kingdom: Animalia
- Phylum: Chordata
- Class: Actinopterygii
- Order: Siluriformes
- Family: Mochokidae
- Genus: Chiloglanis
- Species: C. neumanni

Binomial name
- Chiloglanis neumanni Boulenger, 1911

= Chiloglanis neumanni =

Species of fish

Chiloglanis neumanni, Neumann's suckermouth, is a species of upside-down catfish native to Central Africa. This species grows to a length of 6.5 centimetres (2.6 in) SL.
