= Kalombo suckermouth =

Conservation status
- Vulnerable (IUCN 3.1)

Scientific classification
- Kingdom: Animalia
- Phylum: Chordata
- Class: Actinopterygii
- Order: Siluriformes
- Family: Mochokidae
- Genus: Chiloglanis
- Species: C. kalambo

Binomial name
- Chiloglanis kalambo Seegers, 1996

Species of fish

The Kalombo suckermouth (Chiloglanis kalambo) is a species of upside-down catfish endemic to Tanzania where it occurs in the Kalambo River. This species grows to a length of 4.4 centimetres (1.7 in) TL.
