= Chiloglanis disneyi =

Conservation status
- Least Concern (IUCN 3.1)

Scientific classification
- Kingdom: Animalia
- Phylum: Chordata
- Class: Actinopterygii
- Order: Siluriformes
- Family: Mochokidae
- Genus: Chiloglanis
- Species: C. disneyi

Binomial name
- Chiloglanis disneyi Trewavas, 1974

Species of fish

Chiloglanis disneyi is a species of upside-down catfish endemic to Cameroon where it is found in the Mungo and Manyu River basins. It may also occur in the Cross River basin of Nigeria. This species grows to a length of 3.5 centimetres (1.4 in) SL.
