= Chiloglanis congicus =

Conservation status
- Least Concern (IUCN 3.1)

Scientific classification
- Kingdom: Animalia
- Phylum: Chordata
- Class: Actinopterygii
- Order: Siluriformes
- Family: Mochokidae
- Genus: Chiloglanis
- Species: C. congicus

Binomial name
- Chiloglanis congicus Boulenger, 1920

Species of fish

Chiloglanis congicus is a species of upside-down catfish endemic to the Democratic Republic of the Congo where it occurs in the lower Congo River basin. This species grows to a length of 7.5 centimetres (3.0 in) TL.
