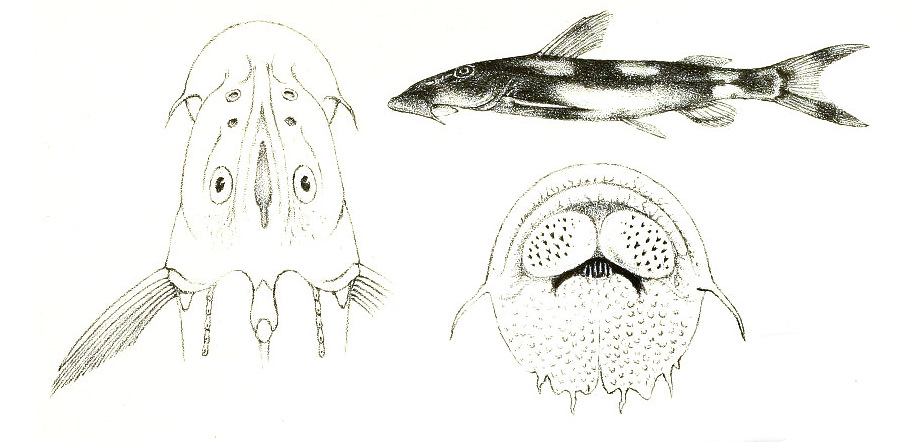

Conservation status
- Least Concern (IUCN 3.1)

Scientific classification
- Kingdom: Animalia
- Phylum: Chordata
- Class: Actinopterygii
- Order: Siluriformes
- Family: Mochokidae
- Genus: Chiloglanis
- Species: C. brevibarbis

Binomial name
- Chiloglanis brevibarbis Boulenger, 1902

= Chiloglanis brevibarbis =

Species of fish

Chiloglanis brevibarbis, the short barbelled suckermouth, is a species of upside-down catfish native to Kenya and Tanzania where it is found in the Athi and Tana River systems. This species grows to a length of 6.1 centimetres (2.4 in) TL.
