= Chiloglanis emarginatus =

Conservation status
- Vulnerable (IUCN 3.1)

Scientific classification
- Kingdom: Animalia
- Phylum: Chordata
- Class: Actinopterygii
- Order: Siluriformes
- Family: Mochokidae
- Genus: Chiloglanis
- Species: C. emarginatus

Binomial name
- Chiloglanis emarginatus Jubb & Le Roux, 1969

Species of fish

Chiloglanis emarginatus, the Phongolo suckermouth, is a species of upside-down catfish native to Eswatini, Mozambique, South Africa and Zimbabwe. From this region, it occurs in the Pongola, Komati, Pungwe and the middle to lower Zambezi Rivers. This species grows to a length of 6.5 centimetres (2.6 in) SL. This fish is of minor importance in local fisheries.
