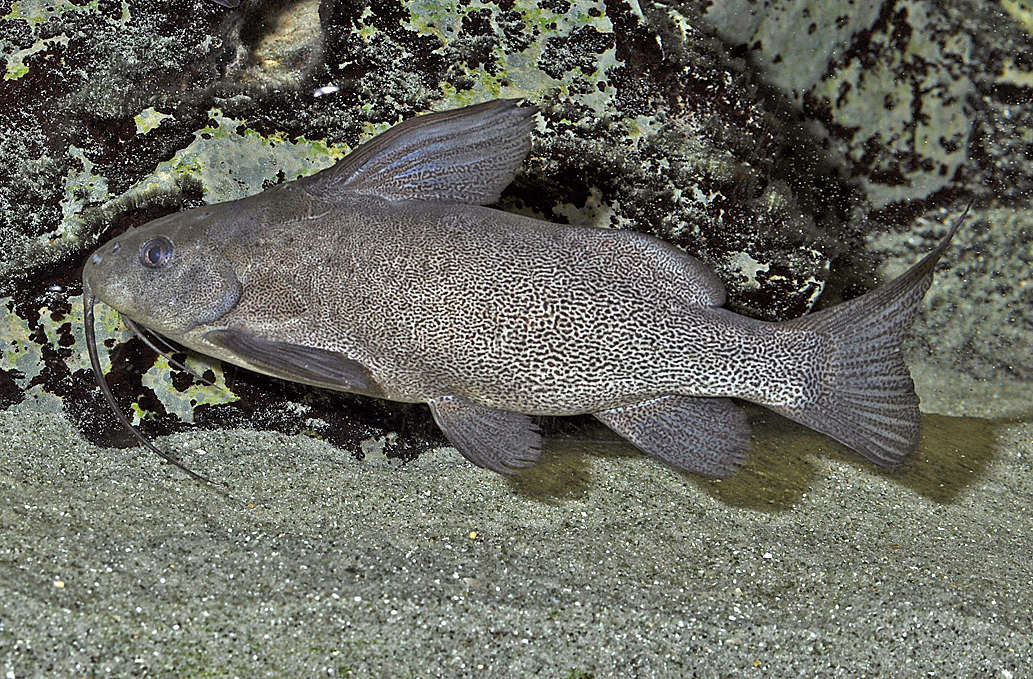

Conservation status
- Least Concern (IUCN 3.1)

Scientific classification
- Kingdom: Animalia
- Phylum: Chordata
- Class: Actinopterygii
- Order: Siluriformes
- Family: Mochokidae
- Genus: Synodontis
- Species: S. vanderwaali

Binomial name
- Synodontis vanderwaali Skelton & White, 1990

= Synodontis vanderwaali =

Species of fish

Synodontis vanderwaali is a species of upside-down catfish native to Angola, Botswana and Namibia where it occurs in the upper Zambezi River, the Okavango River and Delta and the Cunene River. This species grows to a length of 16.03 centimetres (6.31 in) SL.
