= Chiloglanis normani =

Conservation status
- Endangered (IUCN 3.1)

Scientific classification
- Kingdom: Animalia
- Phylum: Chordata
- Class: Actinopterygii
- Order: Siluriformes
- Family: Mochokidae
- Genus: Chiloglanis
- Species: C. normani

Binomial name
- Chiloglanis normani Pellegrin, 1933

Species of fish

Chiloglanis normani is a species of upside-down catfish endemic to Côte d'Ivoire where it occurs in the Cavally River system. This species grows to a length of 4.6 centimetres (1.8 in) SL.
