= Chiloglanis igamba =

Scientific classification
- Kingdom: Animalia
- Phylum: Chordata
- Class: Actinopterygii
- Order: Siluriformes
- Family: Mochokidae
- Genus: Chiloglanis
- Species: C. igamba

Binomial name
- Chiloglanis igamba Friel & Vigliotta, 2011

Species of fish

Chiloglanis igamba is a species of upside-down catfish that occurs in Tanzania's Malagarasi River, to which it is probably endemic. This species grows to a length of 6.5 centimetres (2.6 in) SL.
