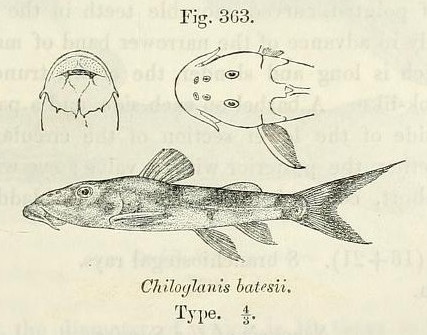

Conservation status
- Least Concern (IUCN 3.1)

Scientific classification
- Kingdom: Animalia
- Phylum: Chordata
- Class: Actinopterygii
- Order: Siluriformes
- Family: Mochokidae
- Genus: Chiloglanis
- Species: C. batesii

Binomial name
- Chiloglanis batesii Boulenger, 1904

= Chiloglanis batesii =

Species of fish

Chiloglanis batesii is a species of upside-down catfish found widely in Western and Central Africa. This species grows to a length of 4.7 centimetres (1.9 in) TL.

Chiloglanis batesii ( fish species)

CLASSIFICATION / Name

Actinopterygii (ray- finned fishes)

Siluriformes (catfish)

Mochokidal (squeakers or upside down cat fishes)

Scientific name: Chiloglanis batesii

Common name: Sucker mouth catfish (Rapid catfish).

Environment: Fresh water; blackish, benthopelagic( deep range). Tropical; 5°N-10°S.

Description:

Dorsal soft rays (total):56, vertebrae 30-33. This genus is the African equivalent of the sucker mouth catfishes of South America and has a sucking disc that helps them to clinging rocks in fast flowing rivers. It's not an easy genus to identify to species.

Aquarium are good oxygenated water from a power filter sand or gravel substrate with smooth rocks or peddles. This dorsal and pectoral find are Sharp and can cause wounds if not handled carefully.

Sexual difference: usually in the form of a different shaped caudal fin.

Diet/ nutrition: algae, fly larvae food, blood work, flake food.

Distribution. Africa: Cameroon, central Africa republic, Chad, Congo CDM republic, Guinea, Mali, Nigeria.

South Cameroon: Eflulen and stream tributaries of the lobi river, 15–26 miles. Southwest of Eflulen

Temperature: 20-26( 23-26 °C) ( 73-79 °F).

pH 6.4-7.2

Size: 7.0 cm

Life cycle: distinct pair during breeding ( spawning).

Characteristics.

* It's the second largest fish genus next to Synodontis in Africa.

*It's characterized by jaws and lips modified into a sucker or oral disc used for adhesiveness and feeding upon objects in the fast flowing waters.

Differences

* It can be distinguished from South America Sucker mouth catfishes by lack of body armour plates.

* The male are distinguished from other male species easily from elongated upper lobe of the caudal fin.

* It has a circular suckermouth disc.

USE: it's used as food to man and other fishes in the water.
