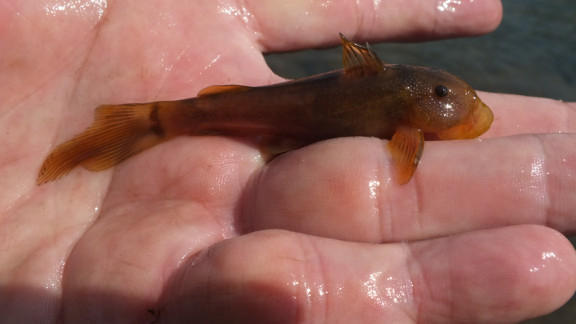

Conservation status
- Least Concern (IUCN 3.1)

Scientific classification
- Kingdom: Animalia
- Phylum: Chordata
- Class: Actinopterygii
- Order: Siluriformes
- Family: Mochokidae
- Genus: Chiloglanis
- Species: C. anoterus

Binomial name
- Chiloglanis anoterus Crass, 1960

= Chiloglanis anoterus =

Species of fish

Chiloglanis anoterus, the pennant-tailed suckermouth, is a species of upside-down catfish native to Mozambique, South Africa and Eswatini where it occurs in escarpment streams of the Pongolo and Incomati River systems. This species grows to a length of 9 centimetres (3.5 in) SL.
