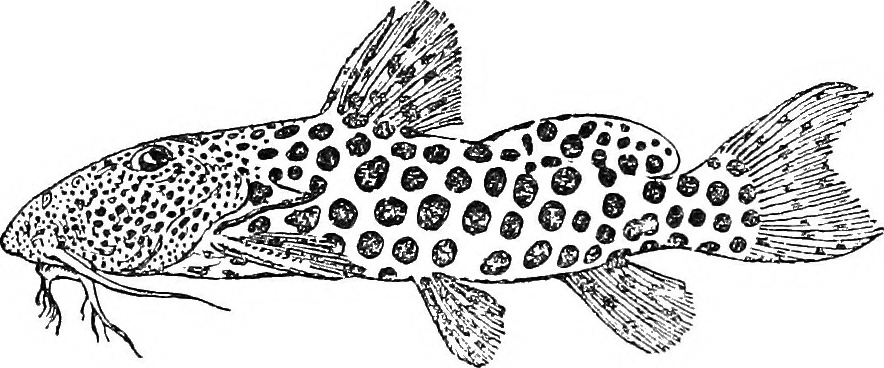

Conservation status
- Least Concern (IUCN 3.1)

Scientific classification
- Kingdom: Animalia
- Phylum: Chordata
- Class: Actinopterygii
- Order: Siluriformes
- Family: Mochokidae
- Genus: Synodontis
- Species: S. courteti

Binomial name
- Synodontis courteti Pellegrin, 1906

= Synodontis courteti =

Species of fish

Synodontis courteti is a species of upside-down catfish that is native to the countries of the Niger and Chad Basins. It has been recorded in Cameroon, Chad, Ghana, Guinea, Mali, Niger, and Nigeria. It was first described by French zoologist Jacques Pellegrin in 1906, from specimens collected in the Chari River, Chad. The species name courteti is named after M. Courtet, member of the "Mission Chari-Lac Chad".

== Description ==
Like all members of the genus Synodontis, S. courteti has a strong, bony head capsule that extends back as far as the first spine of the dorsal fin. The head contains a distinct narrow, bony, external protrusion called a humeral process. The shape and size of the humeral process helps to identify the species. In S. courteti, the humeral process is much longer than it is broad, without a ridge on the bottom edge, and sharply pointed.

The fish has three pairs of barbels. The maxillary barbels are on located on the upper jaw, and two pairs of mandibular barbels are on the lower jaw. The maxillary barbel is long and straight without any branches, without a membrane at the base. It extends to the base of the pectoral spine. The outer pair of mandibular barbels has three simple branches, and the inner pair has five or six simple branches.

The front edges of the dorsal fins and the pectoral fins of Syntontis species are hardened into stiff spines. In S. courteti, the spine of the dorsal fin is about half the length of the head, smooth in the front. The remaining portion of the dorsal fin is made up of seven branching rays. The spine of the pectoral fin is a little stronger and longer than the dorsal spine, and serrated on both sides. The adipose fin is three times as long as it is deep. The anal fin contains four unbranched and nine branched rays. The tail, or caudal fin, is moderately forked.

All members of Syndontis have a structure called a premaxillary toothpad, which is located on the very front of the upper jaw of the mouth. This structure contains several rows of short, chisel-shaped teeth. In S. courteti, the toothpad forms a short and broad band. On the lower jaw, or mandible, the teeth of Syndontis are attached to flexible, stalk-like structures and described as "s-shaped" or "hooked". The number of teeth on the mandible is used to differentiate between species; in S. courteti, there are 13 to 17 teeth on the mandible.

The body color is greyish, with many black dots on the head, and larger round black spots on the body and fins. The spots on the sides of the body are the largest, as large as the eye.

The maximum total length of the species is 55 centimetres (22 in). Generally, females in the genus Synodontis tend to be slightly larger than males of the same age.

== Habitat and behavior ==
In the wild, the species is found in the Chad River and the Niger River basins. It is harvested for human consumption, and is locally impacted by loss of habitat caused by deforestation and agricultural expansion. The reproductive habits of most of the species of Synodontis are not known, beyond some instances of obtaining egg counts from gravid females. Spawning likely occurs during the flooding season between July and October, and pairs swim in unison during spawning. The growth rate is rapid in the first year, then slows down as the fish age.
