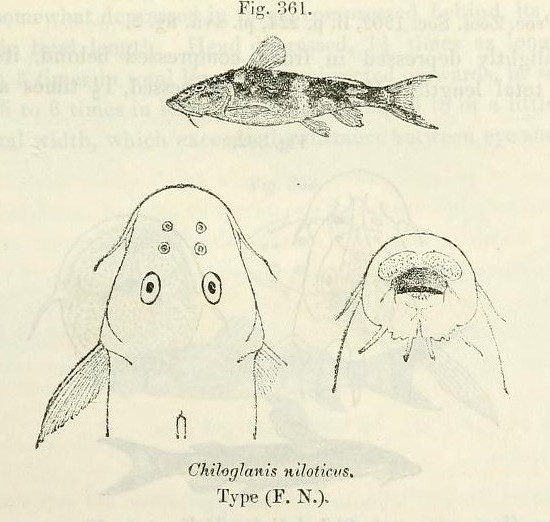

Conservation status
- Data Deficient (IUCN 3.1)

Scientific classification
- Kingdom: Animalia
- Phylum: Chordata
- Class: Actinopterygii
- Order: Siluriformes
- Family: Mochokidae
- Genus: Chiloglanis
- Species: C. niloticus

Binomial name
- Chiloglanis niloticus Boulenger, 1900

= Chiloglanis niloticus =

Species of fish

Chiloglanis niloticus is a species of upside-down catfish native to the Nile River and Niger River. This species grows to a length of 4.5 centimetres (1.8 in) SL.
