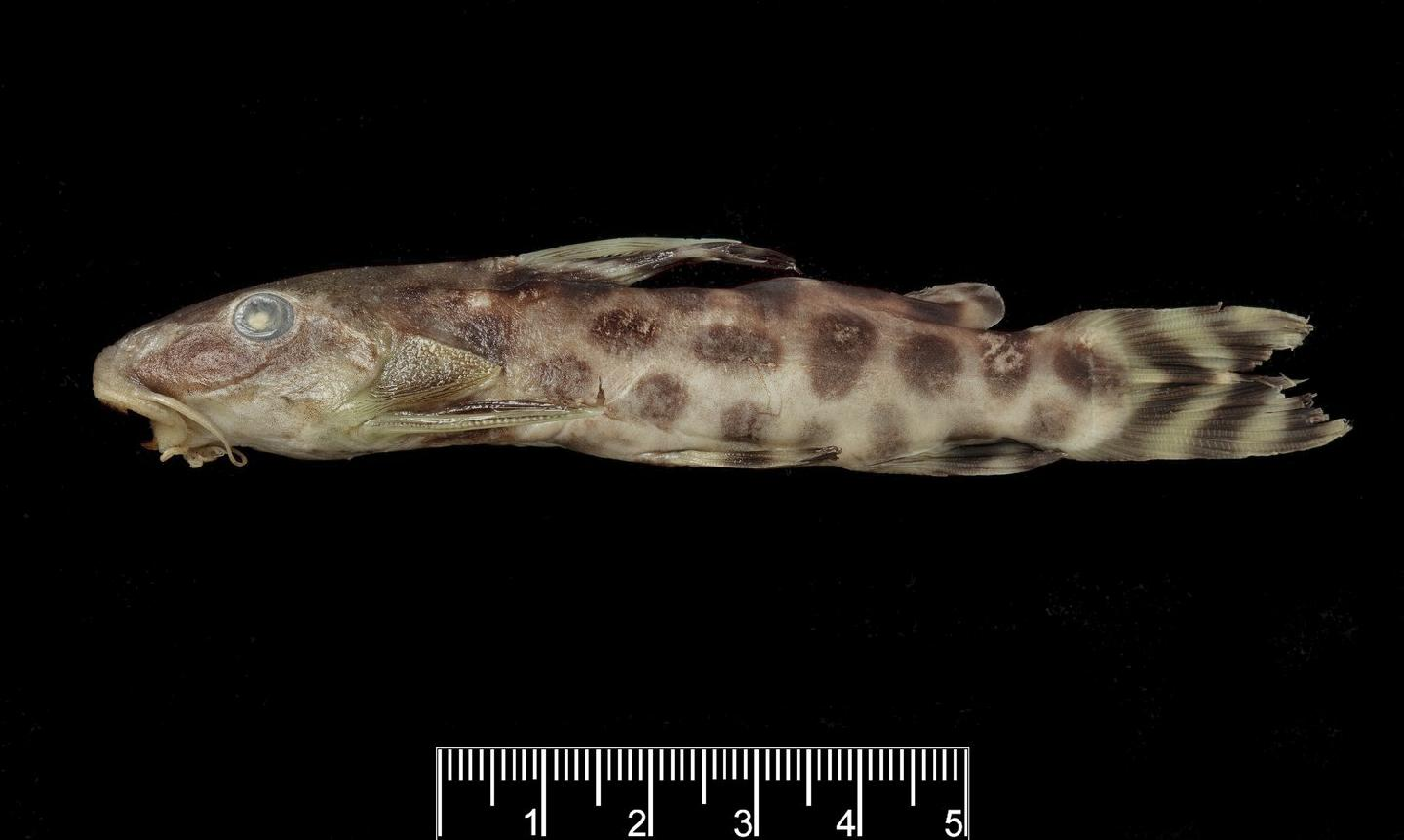

Conservation status
- Least Concern (IUCN 3.1)

Scientific classification
- Kingdom: Animalia
- Phylum: Chordata
- Class: Actinopterygii
- Order: Siluriformes
- Family: Mochokidae
- Genus: Synodontis
- Species: S. katangae

Binomial name
- Synodontis katangae Poll, 1971

= Synodontis katangae =

Species of fish

Synodontis katangae is a species of upside-down catfish that is native to the Democratic Republic of the Congo and Zambia where it is found in the Congo Basin. It was first described by Max Poll in 1971. The original specimens were obtained in Lukonzolwa, on Lake Mweru, in what is now the Democratic Republic of the Congo. The species name katangae is a reference to the Katanga province in the Democratic Republic of the Congo, where the species was first found.

== Description ==
Like all members of the genus Synodontis, S. katangae has a strong, bony head capsule that extends back as far as the first spine of the dorsal fin. The head contains a distinct narrow, bony, external protrusion called a humeral process. The fish has three pairs of barbels. The maxillary barbels are on located on the upper jaw, and two pairs of mandibular barbels are on the lower jaw. The adipose fin is large and the tail, or caudal fin, is forked.

The front edges of the dorsal fins and the pectoral fins are hardened into stiff spines. These spines can be raised into position at right angles to the body and locked into position for defensive purposes. The ability to lock the spines into place comes from several small bones attached to the spine, and once raised, the spines cannot be folded down by exerting pressure on the tip.

The fish has a structure called a premaxillary toothpad, which is located on the very front of the upper jaw of the mouth. This structure contains several rows of short, chisel-shaped teeth. On the lower jaw, or mandible, the teeth are attached to flexible, stalk-like structures and described as "s-shaped" or "hooked".

The maximum total length of the species is 24 centimeters (9.4 in). Generally, females in the genus Synodontis tend to be slightly larger than males of the same age.

== Habitat and behavior ==
In the wild, the species occurs in the Luapula-Mweru system and from the Luashi River and the Lubumbashi region (high Katanga). It is harvested for human consumption. The species faces potential threats to its survival from environmental damage resulting from mining activities, as well as overfishing. As a whole, species of Synodontis are omnivores, consuming insect larvae, algae, gastropods, bivalves, sponges, crustaceans, and the eggs of other fishes. The reproductive habits of most of the species of Synodontis are not known, beyond some instances of obtaining egg counts from gravid females. Spawning likely occurs during the flooding season between July and October, and pairs swim in unison during spawning. The growth rate is rapid in the first year, then slows down as the fish age.
