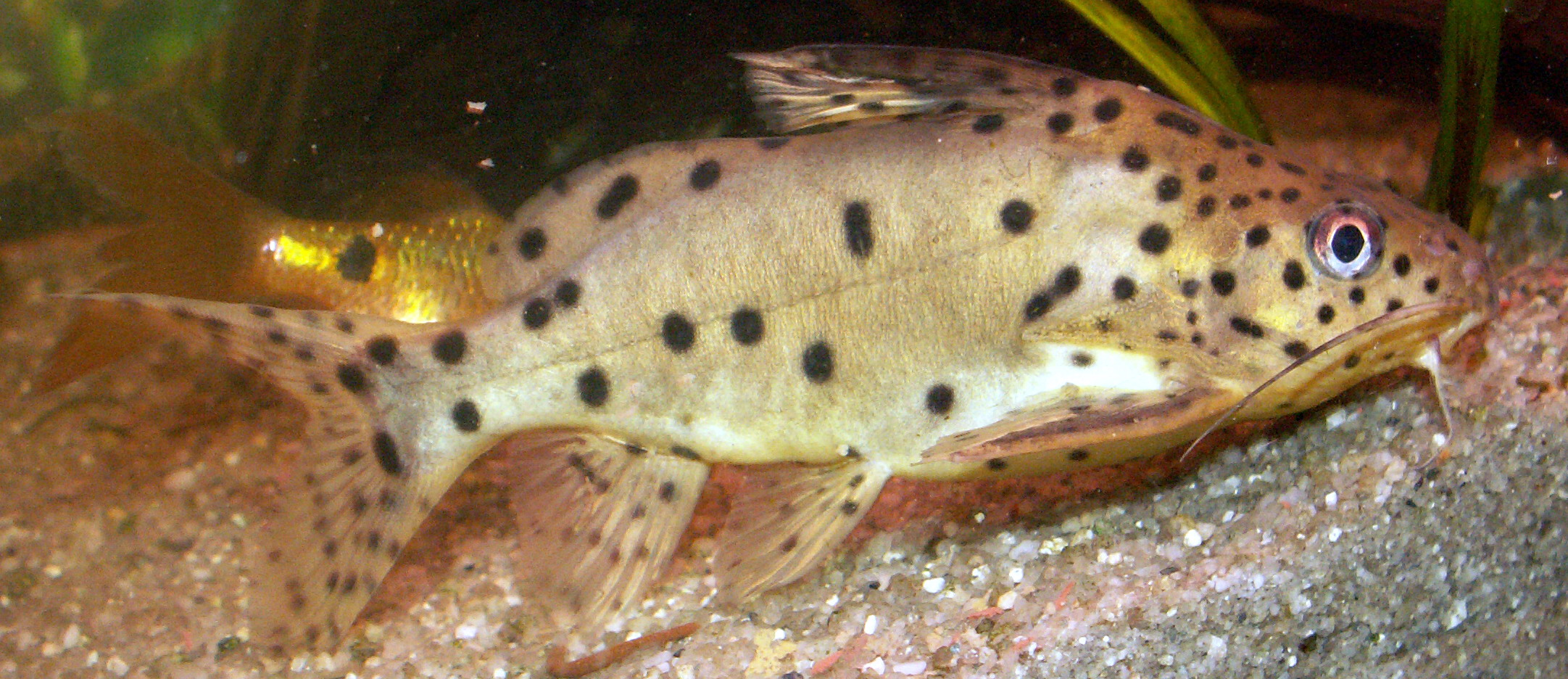

Conservation status
- Least Concern (IUCN 3.1)

Scientific classification
- Kingdom: Animalia
- Phylum: Chordata
- Class: Actinopterygii
- Order: Siluriformes
- Family: Mochokidae
- Genus: Synodontis
- Species: S. njassae

Binomial name
- Synodontis njassae Keilhack, 1908

= Malawi squeaker =

Species of fish

The Malawi squeaker (Synodontis njassae) is a species of upside-down catfish endemic to Lake Malawi. This species grows to a total length of 19.2 cm (7.6 in). This species is a minor component of local commercial fisheries and can also be found in the aquarium trade.

== See also ==
- List of freshwater aquarium fish species
