= Chiloglanis micropogon =

Scientific classification
- Kingdom: Animalia
- Phylum: Chordata
- Class: Actinopterygii
- Order: Siluriformes
- Family: Mochokidae
- Genus: Chiloglanis
- Species: C. micropogon

Binomial name
- Chiloglanis micropogon Poll, 1952

Species of fish

Chiloglanis micropogon is a species of upside-down catfish native to Cameroon, the Democratic Republic of the Congo and Angola, where it occurs in the lower Congo river, the Kasai, Kwango, Dja and Lualaba rivers and Wagenia Falls (Stanley Falls). It also occurs in the Rungumba River, a tributary of Lake Tanganyika in the Democratic Republic of the Congo. This species grows to a length of 4.9 centimetres (1.9 in) TL.
