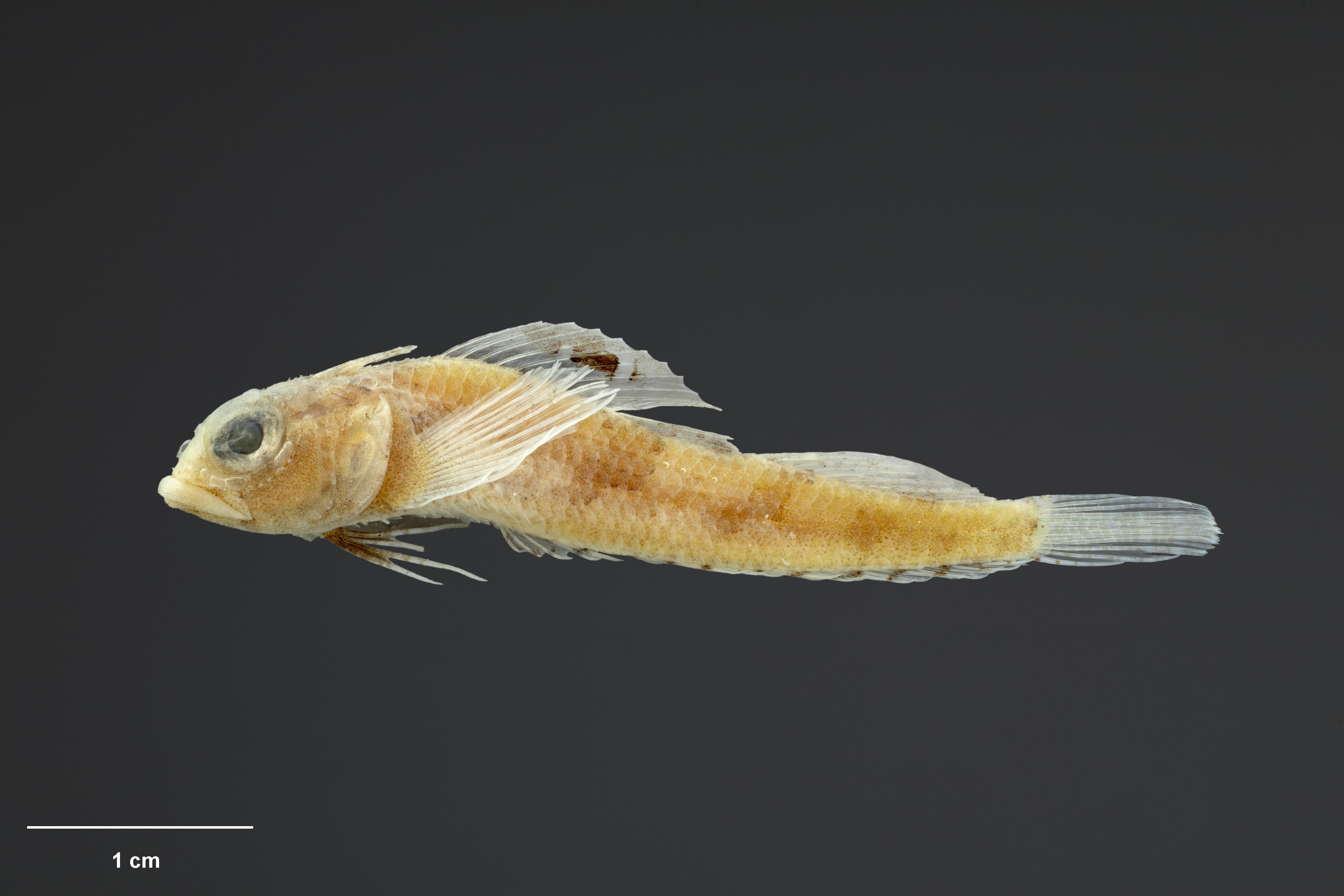
- Apopterygion oculus

Scientific classification
- Kingdom: Animalia
- Phylum: Chordata
- Class: Actinopterygii
- Order: Blenniiformes
- Family: Tripterygiidae
- Subfamily: Tripterygiinae
- Genus: Apopterygion; Kuiter, 1986

Type species
- Apopterygion alta Kuiter, 1986

Species
- 2, See text

= Apopterygion =

Genus of fishes

Apopterygion is a genus of triplefins in the family Tripterygiidae. It has two described species.

== Species ==
- Apopterygion alta Kuiter, 1986 - Tasseled triplefin
- Apopterygion oculus Fricke & Roberts, 1994 - Ocellate triplefin
