= Mochokiella paynei =

Conservation status
- Least Concern (IUCN 3.1)

Scientific classification
- Kingdom: Animalia
- Phylum: Chordata
- Class: Actinopterygii
- Order: Siluriformes
- Family: Mochokidae
- Genus: Mochokiella; Howes, 1980
- Species: M. paynei

Binomial name
- Mochokiella paynei Howes, 1980

Species of fish

Mochokiella paynei is the only species of catfish (order Siluriformes) in the genus Mochokiella of the family Mochokidae. This species is only known from the type locality: the Kassawe Forest Reserve of Sierra Leone. This species is oviparous and grows to 3.6 centimetres (1.4 in) SL.
