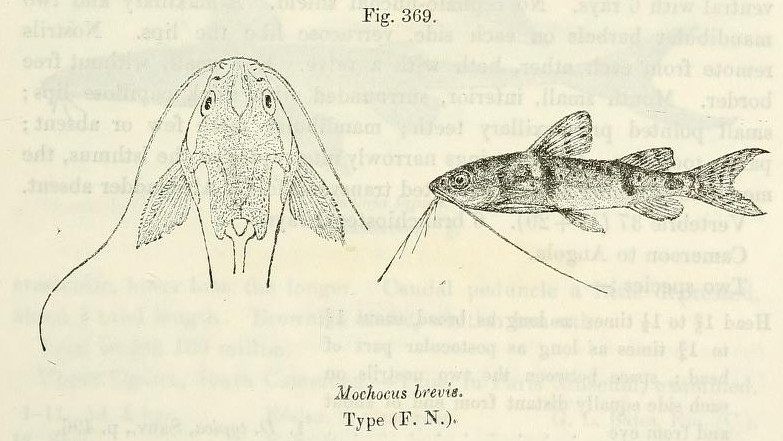
- Mochokus brevis

Scientific classification
- Kingdom: Animalia
- Phylum: Chordata
- Class: Actinopterygii
- Order: Siluriformes
- Family: Mochokidae
- Genus: Mochokus de Joannis, 1835

Type species
- Mochokus niloticus de Joannis, 1835

Synonyms
- Mochocus Günther, 1864; Rhinoglanis Günther, 1864

= Mochokus =

Genus of fishes

Mochokus is a genus of upside-down catfishes native to Africa.

== Species ==
There are currently two recognized species in this genus, known from the Nile, Niger and Chad basins:

- Mochokus brevis Boulenger, 1906
- Mochokus niloticus de Joannis, 1835
