= Chiloglanis kerioensis =

Conservation status
- Least Concern (IUCN 3.1)

Scientific classification
- Kingdom: Animalia
- Phylum: Chordata
- Class: Actinopterygii
- Order: Siluriformes
- Family: Mochokidae
- Genus: Chiloglanis
- Species: C. kerioensis

Binomial name
- Chiloglanis kerioensis Schmidt, Bart & Nyingi, 2015

Synonyms
- Chiloglanis sp. nov. 'Kerio'

Species of fish

Chiloglanis kerioensis is a species of fish in the family Mochokidae. It is endemic to Kenya. Its natural habitat is the Kerio River, for which it is named.
