= Apopterygion alta =

Conservation status
- Least Concern (IUCN 3.1)

Scientific classification
- Kingdom: Animalia
- Phylum: Chordata
- Class: Actinopterygii
- Order: Blenniiformes
- Family: Tripterygiidae
- Genus: Apopterygion
- Species: A. alta

Binomial name
- Apopterygion alta Kuiter, 1986

Species of fish

Apopterygion alta, known commonly as the tasselled triplefin, is a species of triplefin blenny. It is endemic to the waters off south-eastern Australia from northern Tasmania to Port Phillip in Victoria. It is normally observed on yellow sponges.
