= Atopodontus =

Conservation status
- Data Deficient (IUCN 3.1)

Scientific classification
- Kingdom: Animalia
- Phylum: Chordata
- Class: Actinopterygii
- Order: Siluriformes
- Family: Mochokidae
- Genus: Atopodontus; Friel & Vigliotta, 2008
- Species: A. adriaensi

Binomial name
- Atopodontus adriaensi Friel & Vigliotta, 2008

Species of fish

Atopodontus adriaensi is a species of upside-down catfish endemic to Gabon where it occurs in rapids of the Ivindo, Okano, Ngounié and the Nyanga Rivers. This species grows to a length of 10.0 centimetres (3.9 in) SL. This species is the only described member of its genus.

== Etymology ==
The catfish is named in honor of biologist Dominique Adriaens (b. 1970), of the University of Ghent, who brought the existence of this species to the authors’ attention.
