= Acanthocleithron =

Conservation status
- Least Concern (IUCN 3.1)

Scientific classification
- Kingdom: Animalia
- Phylum: Chordata
- Class: Actinopterygii
- Order: Siluriformes
- Family: Mochokidae
- Genus: Acanthocleithron; Nichols & Griscom, 1917
- Species: A. chapini

Binomial name
- Acanthocleithron chapini Nichols & Griscom, 1917

Species of fish

Acanthocleithron chapini is the only species of catfish (order Siluriformes) in the genus Acanthocleithron of the family Mochokidae. This species is endemic to the Democratic Republic of the Congo where it occurs in the Ituri River and Congo River from Kisangani to Stanley Pool. This oviparous fish reaches a length of 5.5 centimetres (2.2 in) SL.
