= Cavalla River =

River in West Africa

Coordinates: 4°22′N 7°32′W

Cavalla river Cavally, Youbou, Diougou
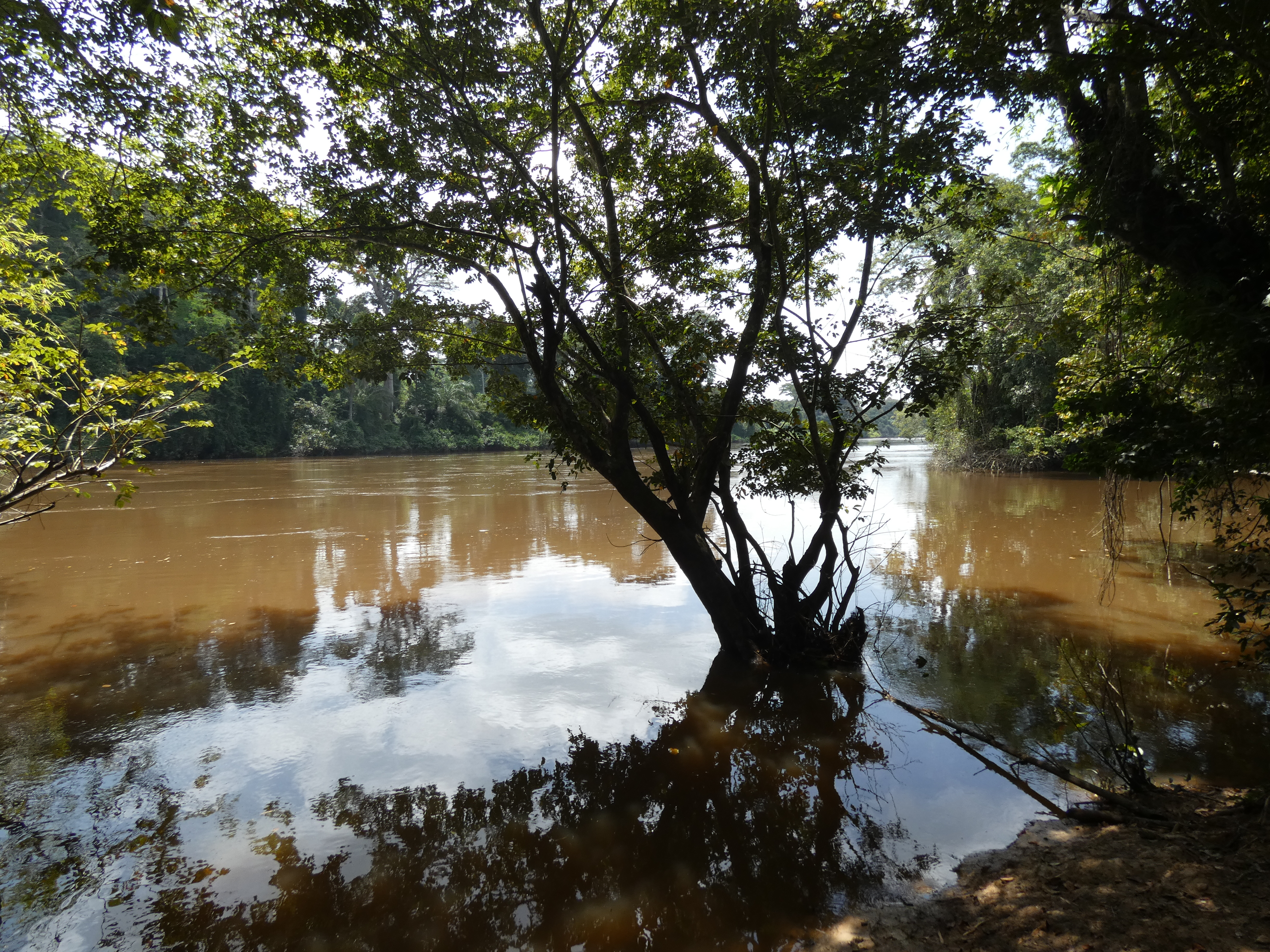

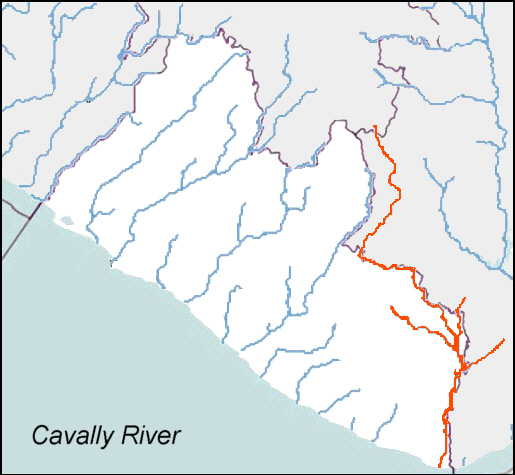
- The Cavalla River drains the border areas of Ivory Coast and Liberia.

Location
- Countries: Guinea; Ivory Coast; Liberia

Physical characteristics
- Mouth
  - location: Gulf of Guinea
  - elevation: 0 m (0 ft)
- Length: 515 km (320 mi)
- Basin size: 29,495 km^{2} (11,388 mi^{2})
- Discharge
  - location: Near mouth
  - average: (Period: 1979–2015) 37.61 km^{3}/a (1,192 m^{3}/s)

Basin features
- River system: Cavalla River

The Cavalla River (also known as the Cavally, the Youbou and the Diougou) is a river in West Africa, rising north of Mont Nimba in Guinea, flowing through Ivory Coast and back to the border with Ivory Coast. It ends in the Gulf of Guinea, situated 21 km (13 mi) east of Harper, Liberia. It forms the southern two-thirds of the international boundary between Liberia and Ivory Coast.

It has a length of 515 kilometers (320 mi), and is the longest river in Liberia. The name is derived from the cavalla horse mackerel found at its mouth. It is home to the endemic Chiloglanis normani.
