= Ecology and evolutionary biology =

Interdisciplinary field of study

Ecology and evolutionary biology is an interdisciplinary field of study concerning interactions between organisms and their ever-changing environment, including perspectives from both evolutionary biology and ecology. This field of study includes topics such as the way organisms respond and evolve, as well as the relationships among animals, plants, and micro-organisms, when their habitats change. Ecology and evolutionary biology is a broad field of study that covers various ranges of ages and scales, which can also help us to comprehend human impacts on the global ecosystem and find measures to achieve more sustainable development.

== Examples of current research topics ==
=== Birdsong ===
There is a number of acoustic research about birds. Birds learn to sing in specific patterns because birdsong conveys information to select partners, which is a result of evolution. However, this evolution is also affected by ecological factors. Research with recorded birdsong of male white-crowned sparrows from different regions found that the birdsongs from the same location have the same traits, while birdsongs from different locations are more likely to have different song types. Birdsongs from areas with dense vegetation tend to only have slow trilling sounds and low frequencies, while birdsongs from more open areas have fast trilling sounds and higher frequencies. This is probably due to differences in the propagation of sound through vegetation. Low frequencies can be heard from further away when going through dense vegetation than high frequencies. For that reason it would be an advantage for birds who live in dense vegetation to sing at lower frequencies. That way, their songs can still be heard by competitors and potential mates far away.

Something similar was found in birds living on a mountain. The birds who lived higher up were singing at higher frequencies. This was probably due to the higher parts of the mountain being colder and therefore fewer other species living there. Other animals also make sounds with which the birds would have to compete, so when there are less species, there are less high frequency sounds to compete with.

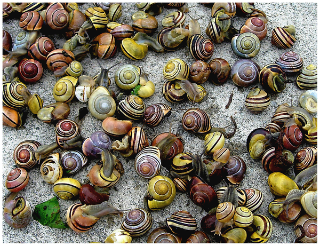
A collection of snails from a polymorphic population of Cepaea nemoralis in Poland

=== Snail colour ===
The colour and ornamentation of the snails' shells are almost entirely determined by their genes. One kind of land snail, Cepaea nemoralis, which is very common in Europe, has been studied and found to have a few different colours and a different amount of dark bands on their shells. In a large citizen science project 'the Evolution Mega-Lab', citizens of many different countries throughout Europe collected snails and counted how many snails of a certain colour/band pattern were present in a certain habitat.

Some colours can be seen better by birds, which is one way in which the best camouflaged snails are selected for. This also depends on the habitat in which the snails live. For instance yellow snails living in the dunes are better camouflaged than brown snails. Another reason that one colour of shell might be better in a certain habitat is because of the temperature. It was found that darker shells absorb more heat, which can be a risk for overheating of the snail in certain habitats like dunes. In those places lighter coloured snails were found more often.

== Urban evolution ==
With fast growing cities and high rates of urbanization a whole new kind of environment has emerged. The urban ecosystem is a place of extremities and makes for fast evolution. Higher rates of phenotypic change have been observed in urban areas compared to natural and nonurban anthropogenic systems. A field of study has emerged regarding urban evolution in which the adaptations of animals and plants to urban environments are studied.

In tropical regions a certain species of lizards, Anolis cristatellus, lives in both urban and natural areas. These lizards climb on tree trunks, fences and the walls of buildings. In urban areas more slippery and smooth surfaces are found than in natural areas. This creates a higher risk of falling and dying. The lizards in cities were found to have adapted to these slippery surfaces, by developing longer limbs and more lamellae under their feet that help them to run safely on these smooth surfaces.

One of the differences between urban areas and natural areas is anthropogenic noise, such as traffic noise. The frequencies of these sounds overlap partly with the frequencies of bird songs. In cities, birds started to sing at higher frequencies than they do in natural areas, in order to still be heard by their conspecifics. Their songs were also found to be shorter. This is a way in which the birds adapt to the new urban environment.

An example of urban evolution in plants was found in Crepis sancta. This plant makes seeds with pappus that can travel with the wind, for seed dispersal. In urban environments green patches are very rare and are also often very small and far apart. Due to this, the chances of the seeds landing on asphalt or stone and not being able to sprout are way higher than in open fields. Crepis sancta makes both light seeds with pappus as well as heavier seeds without pappus. In the city the plants were found to make more heavy seeds in comparison to the plants in nonurban areas. This makes sense from an evolutionary perspective since heavy seeds fall very close to the mother-plant, probably in the same green patch, and therefore have a higher chance of sprouting.

Another characteristic of urban areas is light pollution. One of the well known consequences of light pollution is the attraction of insects. Before the presence of human light, the only source of light at night was the moon. Insects fly with a fixed angle to the moon to be able to fly in a straight line. Our light sources, however, are very close by. So if an insect flies with a fixed angle compared to a street light for instance, he starts flying in circles and eventually ends up circling the street light, which reduces his chances of finding food and a mating partner. Urban moths were found to have a reduced attraction to light sources, which directly impacts their chances for survival and mating by not wasting time close to a light source.

== Degrees in North America ==
Some North American universities are home to degree programs titled Ecology and Evolutionary Biology, offering integrated studies in the disciplines of ecology and evolutionary biology. The wording is intended as representing the alternative approach from the frequently used pairing of Cell and Molecular Biology, while being more inclusive than the terminology of Botany or Zoology. Recently, due to advances in the fields of genetics and molecular biology, research and education in ecology and evolutionary biology has integrated many molecular techniques.

A program that focuses on the relationships and interactions that range across levels of biological organization based on a scientific study is Ecology and Evolutionary Biology. The origins and history of ecosystems, species, genes and genomes, and organisms, and how these have changed over time is all part of the studies of how biodiversity has evolved and how it takes place. Ecology and Evolutionary biology in North America is based on research impact determined by the top 10% of ecology programs. The interactive web of organisms and environment are all part of what the field of Ecology explores. There have been studies in evolution that have worked to prove that "modern organisms have developed from ancestral ones." The reason that evolutionary biology is so interesting to learn about is because of the evolutionary processes that is the reason we have such a diversity of life on Earth.There are many processes that make up evolutionary biology that give great insight to how we came to be, some of which include natural selection, speciation, and common descent.

Among the best-known Ph.D.-granting departments that use this name are

- Columbia University
- Cornell University
- Princeton University
- Rice University
- University of Arizona
- University of California at Los Angeles
- University of Colorado
- University of Michigan
- University of Toronto
- Yale University

== See also ==
- Evolutionary biology
- Evolution
- Ecology
