= Dorothy Wanja Nyingi =

Kenyan ichthyologist

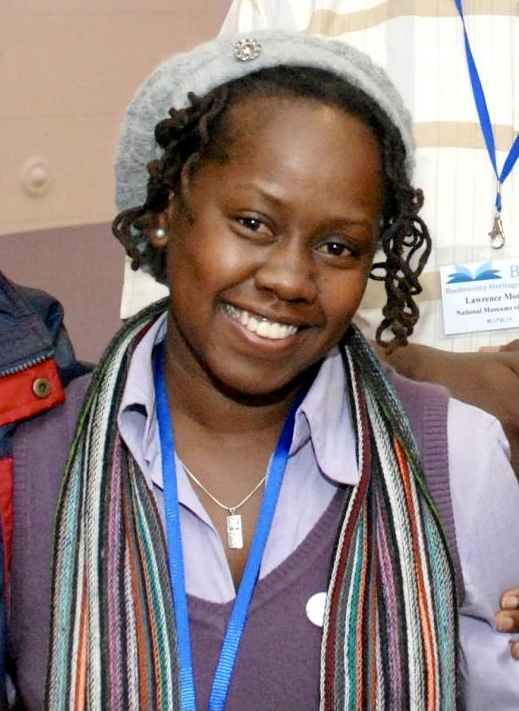
- Dorothy Wanja Nyingi en 2011.
- Born: 1973; Nairobi

Dorothy Wanja Nyingi (born 1973) is a Kenyan ichthyologist and recipient of the Ordre des Palmes académiques (Order of Academic Palms) for her work on Fish Biodiversity and Aquatic Ecology. She is the head of the Ichthyology Department at the National Museums of Kenya. She is a freshwater ecologist focusing on community driven conservation and the author of the first guide to fresh water fish in Kenya, Guide to the Common Freshwater Fishes of Kenya.

== Education ==
She attained a Bachelor of Science in Zoology from the University of Nairobi in 1998 and then a Master of Science in Hydrobiology from the University of Nairobi in 2002. She studied morphological and genetic diversity of Nile tilapia in Africa at the University of Montpellier II where she earned a Masters of Science in 2004 and PhD in 2007 in Ecology and Evolutionary Biology. Her studies in France were supported by a scholarship awarded from the French government relayed by the Institute for Research and Development.

== Taxon described ==
- See Category:Taxa named by Dorothy Wanja Nyingi

== List of works ==
=== Books ===
- Nyingi, D.W. 2013. Guide to the common freshwater fishes of Kenya. Moran Publishers, Nairobi, Kenya
- Nyingi D.W. and Agnese J.F. 2012. Phylogeography of the Nile Tilapia in Africa. Lambert Academic Publishers.

=== Book chapters ===
- Nyingi, W.D., Agnese, J-F., Ford, A.G.P., Day, J.J., Ndiwa, T.C., Turner, G.F., and Getahun, A. (2021). Identifying and conserving tilapiine cichlid species in the twenty-first century. Pp. 285-312 in: Abate, M.E., Noakes, D.L. (eds) The Behavior, Ecology and Evolution of Cichlid Fishes. Fish & Fisheries Series, vol 40. Springer, Dordrecht. https://doi.org/10.1007/978-94-024-2080-7_9
- Hamerlynck O., Nyingi D.W., Paul, J.-L. & Duvail S. 2019. Chapter 11: “The fish-based farming systems: maintaining ecosystem health and flexible livelihood portfolios”. In Dixon et al. (ed s) Farming systems and food security in Africa: Priorities for Science and Policy under Global Change. Routledge, Earthscan, 640
- Nyingi, W., Oguge, N., Dziba, L., Chandipo, R., Didier, T. A., Gandiwa, E., Kasiki, S., Kisanga, D., Kgosikoma, O., Osano, O., Tassin, J., Sanogo, S., von Maltitz, G., Ghazi, H., Archibald, S., Gambiza, J., Ivey, P., Logo, P. B., Maoela, M. A., Ndarana, T., Ogada, M., Olago, D., Rahlao, S., and van Wilgen, B. Chapter 4: Direct and indirect drivers of change in biodiversity and nature’s contributions to people. In IPBES (2018): The IPBES regional assessment report on biodiversity and ecosystem services for Africa. Archer, E., Dziba, L., Mulongoy, K. J., Maoela, M. A., and Walters, M. (eds.). Secretariat of the Intergovernmental Science-Policy Platform on Biodiversity and Ecosystem Services, Bonn, Germany, pp. 207– 296.
- Kishe-Machumu, M.A, Natugonza, V., Nyingi, D.W., Snoeks, J., Carr, J, Seehausen, O., and Sayer, C.A. 2018. The status and distribution of freshwater fishes in the Lake Victoria Basin in Sayer, C.A., Máiz-Tomé, L. and Darwall, W.R.T. (2018). Freshwater biodiversity in the Lake Victoria Basin: Guidance for species conservation, site protection, climate resilience and sustainable livelihoods. Cambridge, UK and Gland, Switzerland: IUCN. xiv +226pp
- Nyingi D.W, N. Gichuki and M. O. Ogada, Freshwater Ecology of Kenyan Highlands and Lowlands. In Paolo Paron, Daniel Olago and Christian Thine Omuto, editors: Developments in Earth Surface Processes, Vol. 16, Amsterdam: The Netherlands, 2013, pp. 199-218
- Ogada, M.O and Nyingi D.W. The Management of Wildlife and Fisheries Resources in Kenya: Origins, Present Challenges and Future Perspectives. In Paolo Paron, Daniel Olago and Christian Thine Omuto, editors: Developments in Earth Surface Processes, Vol. 16, Amsterdam: The Netherlands, 2013, pp. 219-235

Peer-review Articles:

- Ciezarek, A., Mehta, T. K., Man, A., Ford, A. G. P., Kavembe, G. D., Kasozi, N., Ngatunga, B. P., Shechonge, A., Tamatamah, R., Nyingi, D. W., Cnaani, A., Ndiwa, T. C., Di Palma, F., Turner, G. F., Genner, M. J., & Haerty, W. (2024). Ancient and recent hybridization in the Oreochromis cichlid fishes. Molecular Biology and Evolution, 41(7), msae116. https://doi.org/10.1093/molbev/msae116
- Zhang, E., Nyingi, W. D., & Cao, L. (2023). Species of the cyprinid genus Garra in Mount Kenya, East Africa: Species delineation, taxonomy and historical biogeography. Zoologica Scripta. https://doi.org/10.1111/zsc.12626
- Ndiwa, T., Nyingi, W., & Agnèse, J.-F. (2023). Genetic diversity of a cichlid fish population after 100 years of isolation. African Journal of Ecology. https://doi.org/10.1111/aje.13144
- Schmidt, R. C., Woods, T., & Nyingi, D. W. (2022). Drivers of species richness and beta diversity of fishes in an Afrotropical intermittent river system. Ecology and Evolution.
- Ciezarek, A. G., Mehta, T. K., Man, A., Ford, A. G. P., Kavembe, G. D., Kasozi, N., Ngatunga, B. P., Shechonge, A., Tamatamah, R., Nyingi, D. W., Cnaani, A., Ndiwa, T. C., Di Palma, F., Turner, G. F., Genner, M. J., & Haerty, W. (2024). Ancient and recent hybridization in the Oreochromis cichlid fishes. Molecular Biology and Evolution, 41(7), msac116. https://doi.org/10.1093/molbev/msac116
- Lawson, M. R. M., Hayle, M. G. B., Shechonge, A. H., Nyingi, W. D., Ford, A. G. P., Hoffman, J. I., Day, J. J., Turner, G. F., & Dasmahapatra, K. K. (2023). Sympatric and allopatric Alcolapia soda lake cichlid species show similar levels of assortative mating. Frontiers in Ecology and Evolution, 11, Article 1150083. https://doi.org/10.3389/fevo.2023.1150083
- Schubert, A., Nyingi, W., Tuda, P., Aura, C. M., Obiero, K., Manyala, J., Cowx, I. G., Vianna, G., Ansell, A., Meeuwig, J., & Zeller, D. (2021). Reconstructing Kenya’s total freshwater fisheries catches: 1950–2017. Marine and Freshwater Research. https://doi.org/10.1071/MF21189
- Dieleman, J., Cocquyt, C., Nyingi, W. D., & Verschuren, D. (2021). Seasonality in diet and feeding habits of the endemic Chala tilapia (Oreochromis hunteri) and two introduced tilapiine cichlids in Lake Chala, East Africa. Hydrobiologia, 848(16), 3763–3777. https://doi.org/10.1007/s10750-020-04427-3
- Getahun, A., Wakjira, M., & Nyingi, D. W. (2020). Social, economic and management status of small-scale fisheries in Omo River Delta and Ethiopian side of Lake Turkana, southern Ethiopia. Ecohydrology & Hydrobiology, 20(3), 323–332. https://doi.org/10.1016/j.ecohyd.2020.05.00
- Bart, H. L., Schmidt, R. C., Nyingi, W., & Gathua, J. (2019). A new species of cyprinoid fish from the Tana River, Kenya (Actinopterygii: Danionidae). Zootaxa, 4652(3), 533–543. https://doi.org/10.11646/zootaxa.4652.3.6
- Mzingirwa, F. A., Mkare, T. K., Nyingi, D. W., & Njiru, J. (2019). Genetic diversity and spatial population structure of a deepwater snapper, Pristipomoides filamentosus in the southwest Indian Ocean. Molecular Biology Reports, 46(5), 5079–5088. https://doi.org/10.1007/s11033-019-04997-8
- Dieleman, J., Van Bocxlaer, B., Nyingi, W. D., Lyaruu, A., & Verschuren, D. (2019). Recurrent changes in cichlid dentition linked to climate-driven lake-level fluctuations. Ecosphere, 10(4), e02664. https://doi.org/10.1002/ecs2.2664
- Schmidt, R. C., Bart, H. L., Nyingi, W., & Gathua, J. (2019). Integrative taxonomy of the red-finned barb, Enteromius apleurogramma (Cyprininae: Smiliogastrini) from Kenya, supports recognition of E. amboseli as a valid species. Zootaxa, 4482(3), 566–578. https://doi.org/10.11646/zootaxa.4482.3.8
- Cao, L., Song, X., Xue, L., Nyingi, D. W., & Zhang, E. (2019). Mitogenomic and phylogenetic analyses of the Nile pufferfish Tetraodon lineatus (Linnaeus, 1758) (Pisces: Tetraodontidae) from Lake Turkana in East Africa. Mitochondrial DNA Part B: Resources, 4(2), 2540–2542. https://doi.org/10.1080/23802359.2019.1649370
- Hamerlynck, O., Nyingi, W. D., Paul, J.-L., & Duvail, S. (2019). The fish-based farming system: Maintaining ecosystem health and flexible livelihood portfolios. In Farming systems and food security in Africa (pp. 354–392). Publisher.
- Dieleman, J., Muschick, M., Nyingi, D. W., & Verschuren, D. (2018). Species integrity and origin of Oreochromis hunteri (Pisces: Cichlidae), endemic to crater Lake Chala (Kenya–Tanzania). Hydrobiologia, 832, 313–330. https://doi.org/10.1007/s10750-018-3570-7
- Okwiri, B., Cao, L., Nyingi, D. W., & Zhang, E. (2018). Molecular phylogenetic analysis of the catfish species Auchenoglanis occidentalis (Valenciennes, 1840) (Pisces: Claroteidae) from Lake Turkana in East Africa: Taxonomic implications. Zootaxa, 4450(1), 115–124. https://doi.org/10.11646/zootaxa.4450.1.6
- Duvail, S., Hamerlynck, O., Paron, P., Hervé, D., Nyingi, W. D., & Leone, M. (2017). The changing hydro-ecological dynamics of rivers and deltas of the Western Indian Ocean: Anthropogenic and environmental drivers, local adaptation and policy response. Comptes Rendus. Géoscience, 349(6–7), 269–279. https://doi.org/10.1016/j.crte.2017.09.004
- Schmidt, R. C., Bart, H. L. Jr., & Nyingi, W. D. (2018). Integrative taxonomy of the red-finned barb, Enteromius apleurogramma (Cyprininae: Smiliogastrini) from Kenya, supports recognition of E. amboseli as a valid species. Zootaxa, 4482(3), 566–578. https://doi.org/10.11646/zootaxa.4482.3.8
- Ndiwa, T. C., Nyingi, D., Wemali, E., & Yusuf, H. A. (2017). Seafood value chains and mangrove restoration in Mida Creek. In J. Leew, G. Koech, A. Yaye, & J. Nyongesa (Eds.), A review of best practice in the Horn of Africa with biodiversity-based value chain development for pro-poor biodiversity conservation (pp. xx–xx). Nairobi, Kenya: ICRAF.
- Schmidt, R., Bart, H., & Nyingi, D. W. (2017). Multi-locus phylogeny reveals instances of mitochondrial introgression and unrecognized diversity in Kenyan barbs (Cyprininae: Smiliogastrini). Molecular Phylogenetics and Evolution, 111, 35–43. https://doi.org/10.1016/j.ympev.2017.03.015
- Duvail, S., Paul, J.-L., Hamerlynck, O., Majule, A., Nyingi, W. D., Mwakalinga, A., & Kindinda, K. (2017). Recherches participatives en Tanzanie : un observatoire local pour un dialogue autour de la gestion des territoires et de l’eau. Natures Sciences Sociétés, 25(4), 347–359. https://doi.org/10.1051/nss/2018002
- Ndiwa, T. C., Nyingi, D., Claude, J., & Agnèse, J.-F. (2016). Morphological variations of wild populations of Nile tilapia (Oreochromis niloticus) living in extreme environmental conditions in the Kenyan Rift Valley. Environmental Biology of Fishes, 99(5), 473–485. https://doi.org/10.1007/s10641-016-0494-5
- Schmidt, R. C., Bart, H. L. Jr., & Nyingi, W. D. (2015). Two new species of African suckermouth catfishes, genus Chiloglanis (Siluriformes: Mochokidae), from Kenya with remarks on other taxa from the area. Zootaxa, 4044(1), 45–64. https://doi.org/10.11646/zootaxa.4044.1.2
- McCauley, D. J., Dawson, T. E., Power, M. E., Finlay, J. C., Ogada, M., Gower, D. B., Caylor, K., Nyingi, W. D., Githaiga, J. M., Nyunja, J., Joyce, F. H., Lewison, R. L., & Brashares, J. S. (2015). Carbon stable isotopes suggest that hippopotamus-vectored nutrients subsidize aquatic consumers in an East African river. Ecosphere, 6(3), Article 37. https://doi.org/10.1890/ES14-00514.1
- Schmidt, R., Bart, H., Nyingi, D., & Gichuki, N. (2014). Phylogeny of suckermouth catfishes (Mochokidae: Chiloglanis) from Kenya: The utility of growth hormone introns in species-level phylogenies. Molecular Phylogenetics and Evolution, 79, 415–421. https://doi.org/10.1016/j.ympev.2014.06.016
- Ndiwa, T. C., Nyingi, D. W., & Agnèse, J.-F. (2014). An important natural genetic resource of Oreochromis niloticus(Linnaeus, 1758) threatened by aquaculture activities in Loboi Drainage, Kenya. PLoS ONE, 9(9), e106972. https://doi.org/10.1371/journal.pone.0106972
- Duvail, S., Médard, C., Hamerlynck, O., & Nyingi, D. W. (2012). Land and water grabbing in an East African coastal wetland: The case of the Tana Delta. Water Alternatives, 5(2), 322–343.
- Ndiwa, T. C., Mwangi, B. M., Kairu, E., Kaluli, J. W., & Nyingi, D. (2012). Physicochemical characteristics of undrainable water dams utilised for fish rearing in the semi-arid Naromoru area, Central Kenya. Journal of Agriculture, Science and Technology, 14(2), 45–55.
- Hamerlynck, O., Duvail, S., Vandepitte, L., Kindinda, K., Nyingi, D. W., Paul, J.-L., Yanda, P. Z., Mwakalinga, A. B., Mgaya, Y. D., & Snoeks, J. (2011). To connect or not to connect: Floods, fisheries and livelihoods in the Lower Rufiji floodplain lakes, Tanzania. Hydrological Sciences Journal, 56(8), 1436 – 1451. https://doi.org/10.1080/02626667.2011.631014
- Nyingi, D. W., & Agnèse, J.-F. (2011). Tilapia in eastern Africa – a friend and foe. In W. R. T. Darwall, K. G. Smith, D. J. Allen, R. A. Holland, I. J. Harrison, & E. G. E. Brooks (Eds.), The diversity of life in African freshwaters: Under water, under threat (pp. 76–78). Cambridge, UK, & Gland, Switzerland: IUCN.
- Hamerlynck, O., Nyunja, J., Luke, Q., Nyingi, D., Lebrun, D., & Duvail, S. (2010). The communal forest, wetland, rangeland and agricultural landscape mosaics of the Lower Tana, Kenya: A socio-ecological entity in peril. In Sustainable use of biological diversity in socio-ecological production landscapes: Background to the Satoyama Initiative for the benefit of biodiversity and human well-being (pp. 54–62). Convention on Biological Diversity Technical Series No. 52.
- Duvail, S., Valimba, P., Nyunja, J., Nyingi, D., Hamerlynck, O., Léauthaud, C., & Albergel, J. (2010). Floods and ecosystem services in coastal wetlands. In Proceedings of the national workshop on research in the water sector (pp. 14–28). Utalii College, Nairobi.
- Nyingi, D., Aman, R., De Vos, L., & Agnèse, J.-F. (2009). Genetic evidence of an unknown and endangered native natural population of Oreochromis niloticus (Linnaeus, 1758) in Loboi Swamp (Kenya). Aquaculture, 297(1–4), 57 – 63. https://doi.org/10.1016/j.aquaculture.2009.09.024
- Nyingi, D., & Agnèse, J.-F. (2007). Recent introgressive hybridization revealed by exclusive mtDNA transfer from O. leucostictus (Trewavas, 1933) to O. niloticus (Linnaeus, 1758) in Lake Baringo (Kenya). Journal of Fish Biology, 71(2), 435–
