= Cornelius van der Horst =

Dutch biologist

Cornelius Jan van der Horst (11 May 1889, Nieuwer-Amstel – 10 October 1951, Johannesburg) was a Dutch biologist who worked mainly on marine biology and embryology in both the Netherlands and South Africa. As an undergraduate he studied botany and zoology at the University of Amsterdam where he was appointed assistant in the Botany Department under Professor Dr Hugo de Vries before moving on to assist Max Wilhelm Carl Weber at the University's Zoological Museum and in 1917 he became the principal assistant for general Zoology. In 1916 he published his thesis De motorische kernen en banen in de hersenen der visschen. Hare taxonomische waarde en neurobiotactische beteekenis ("The motor nuclei and orbits in the brain of the fish. Its taxonomic value and neurobiotactic meaning "). The research for this thesis was carried out at the Netherlands Central Institute for Brain Research under C. U. Ariëns Kappers. In 1925 Van der Horst was appointed Deputy Director of this Netherlands Central Institute for Brain Research and in 1928 he moved to South Africa where he took up a post as senior lecturer in zoology at the University of the Witwatersrand in Johannesburg. in 1932 he was promoted to professor in zoology at this University.

Van der Horst's early research concentrated on the anatomy of the nervous system of fishes and he published papers on this topic, at the same time he grew interested in corals and published a monograph on the Fungiidae, Agariciidae and Eupsammiidae collected by the Siboga Expedition, as well as writing a paper on the Agariciidae collected by the Percy Sladen Expedition of the Linnean Society. In 1920 Van der Horst undertook a trip to Curaçao to conduct research into the marine fauna, he had studies so many coral skeletons that he wanted to examine the living organisms. He stayed at the old Quarantine Station on the island and studies the fauna using a box with a glass bottom but his studies were much facilitated when the Chief of Public Works lent him a diving suit. He amassed a large collection of specimens while in Curaçao and these specimens were studied by over twenty specialists and resulted in many papers. van der Horst wrote a travelogue detailing the sites where he collected his specimens and later he published a list of the corals with notes on their morphology. At the same time he was editing papers on the acorn worms or Enteropneusta, a group of animals about which he was to publish a series of publications. In his research on acorn worms he demonstrated a thorough knowledge of the literature, as well as a clear understanding of the complex anatomy and morphology of this group, he soon became recognised as one of the leading authorities on the Enteropneusta, eventually having a genus, Horstia, named after him. While in Curaçao among the specimens he collected was the type of a new species of goby which was subsequently named after him, Elacatinus horsti.

Following his trip to Curaçao, van der Horst continued to research brain anatomy for a few months under Charles Judson Herrick at the University of Chicago. His continuing interest in this field was shown some years later when he went to Stockholm to collaborate with Nils Holmgren in an investigation into the anatomy of the brain of Neoceratodus. He also wrote several chapters in Heinrich Georg Bronn's Klassen und Ordnungen des Thier-Reichs, wissenschaftlich dargestellt in Wort und Bild (Classes and orders of the Animal Kingdom, scientifically represented in words and pictures") and contributed a chapter on spinal nerves to the "Handbuch der Vergleichenden Anatomie der Wirbeltiere ("Handbook of Comparative Anatomy of Vertebrates").

In South Africa, van der Horst continued his research in the field of systematic zoology, publishing many article on acorn worms, corals and new and remarkable fish from South Africa, as well as some work on mammal systematics. At this time he was beginning to gather materials to conduct research into the embryology of mammals. Between 1940 and 1946 he published a series of articles with Joseph Gilman on embryology on the group of African mammals now known as Afrotheria, such as aardvark, golden moles and elephant shrews, their work being important in clarifying the systematics of these mammals. The visit to Curaçao had stimulated a lifelong interest in marine biology and when in South Africa he conducted expeditions to Inhaca with his students and gradually a small marine biological station was created there, which van der Horst helped create with the cooperation of Portuguese colonial authorities in Mozambique. He was instrumental in organising research into the fossil reptiles and mammals of South Africa; and connected the University of the Witwatersrand with the Bernard Price Institute for Palaeontological Research. He was honorary director of the Bernard Price Institute for Palaeontological Research.

He was a member of the Royal Society of South Africa, a correspondent of the Royal Netherlands Academy of Arts and Sciences (1950), a foreign member of the Norwegian Academy of Science and Letters, a member of the Institute International d'Embryologie and a corresponding member of the Zoological Society of London. He was awarded a gold medal by the Swedish Academy of Sciences in 1950 awarded in commemoration of Carl Linnaeus. Other species named for van der Horst include the ribbon worm Micrura vanderhorsti, the upside down jellyfish Cassiopea vanderhorsti and the acorn worm Saccoglossus horsti
