= Jacques Daget =

French ichthyologist (1919–2009)

Jacques Daget (30 June 1919, Vineuil – 29 June 2009), was a French ichthyologist. He was a professor at the National Museum of Natural History, in Paris. Several marine species have been named after him.

== Species named after him ==
Species named after Daget include:

- Claroteidae Chrysichthys dageti Risch 1992
- Cichlidae Tilapia dageti Thys van den Audenaerde 1971
- Nothobranchiidae Epiplatys dageti dageti Poll, 1953
- Nothobranchiidae Epiplatys dageti monroviae Arnoult & Daget 1965

== See also ==
- Category:Taxa named by Jacques Daget
- species:Jacques Daget
