= Tyson R. Roberts =

American ichthyologist

- Died: June 20, 2025 (aged 85)
- Education: Stanford University

Tyson Royal Roberts (May 31, 1940 – June 20, 2025) was an American ichthyologist. He was described as "the world's foremost authority on Regalecus". He died on June 20, 2025 at the Nakhon Pathom Hospital in Nakhon Pathom, Thailand.

Roberts attended Stanford University, where he earned his B.A. in 1961 and a Ph.D. in 1968. His doctoral thesis was titled "Studies on the osteology and phylogeny of characoid fishes." He won a 1999 Guggenheim Fellowship in the field of "Organismic Biology & Ecology", and was a research associate at the Smithsonian Tropical Research Institute in Panama and also affiliated with the Institute of Molecular Biosciences of Mahidol University, Thailand.

== Career ==
Roberts did extensive fieldwork on tropical freshwater fishes in South America, Africa, Asia, and New Guinea, and worked in most fish collections in museums and other institutions throughout the world. Fish specimens resulting from this fieldwork are deposited in the California Academy of Sciences, Harvard Museum of Comparative Zoology, Smithsonian Institution, Museum of Zoology of the University of São Paulo, Swedish Museum of Natural History, and many other institutions.

He published several major works on fish faunas, including the Kapuas River of Borneo, Fly River of New Guinea, and rapids of the lower Congo River, and described numerous new taxa of freshwater fishes from these and other places. His research also focused on the major adaptive features of Ostariophysan fish groups that facilitated their adaptations and evolutionary radiations. These include the multicuspid teeth of characoids, unicellular epidermal horny projections (named “unculi” by him) in most groups of ostariophysans, and recurrent trophic polymorphism of the lips, horny jaw sheaths, and other soft mouth structures of the Cyprinidae.

Roberts's other scholarly interests included Charles Darwin and his concept of natural selection as products of the Scottish Enlightenment, and identification of royal portrait statues of ancient Khmer devaraja or divine kings with the reigning monarchs they portray including Suryavarman II and Jayavarman VII.

== Selected publications ==
- (with D. J. Stewart). An ecological and systematic survey of fishes in the rapids of the Lower Zaire or Congo River. Bulletin of the Museum of Comparative Zoology. 147(6):239-3 17 (1976).
- An ichthyological survey of the Fly River, Papua New Guinea, with descriptions of new species. Smithsonian Contributions to Zoology 281, vi+72 pp. (1978).
- The freshwater fishes of western Borneo (Kalimantan Barat, Indonesia). Memoirs of the California Academy of Sciences 14, 210 pp. (1989).
- 'Systematics, biology, and distribution of the species of the oceanic Oarfish genus Regalecus : (Teleostei, Lampridiformes, Regalecidae) (2012, Paris: Publications Scientifiques du Muséum, ISBN 978-2856536773)

== See also ==
- Category:Taxa named by Tyson R. Roberts
