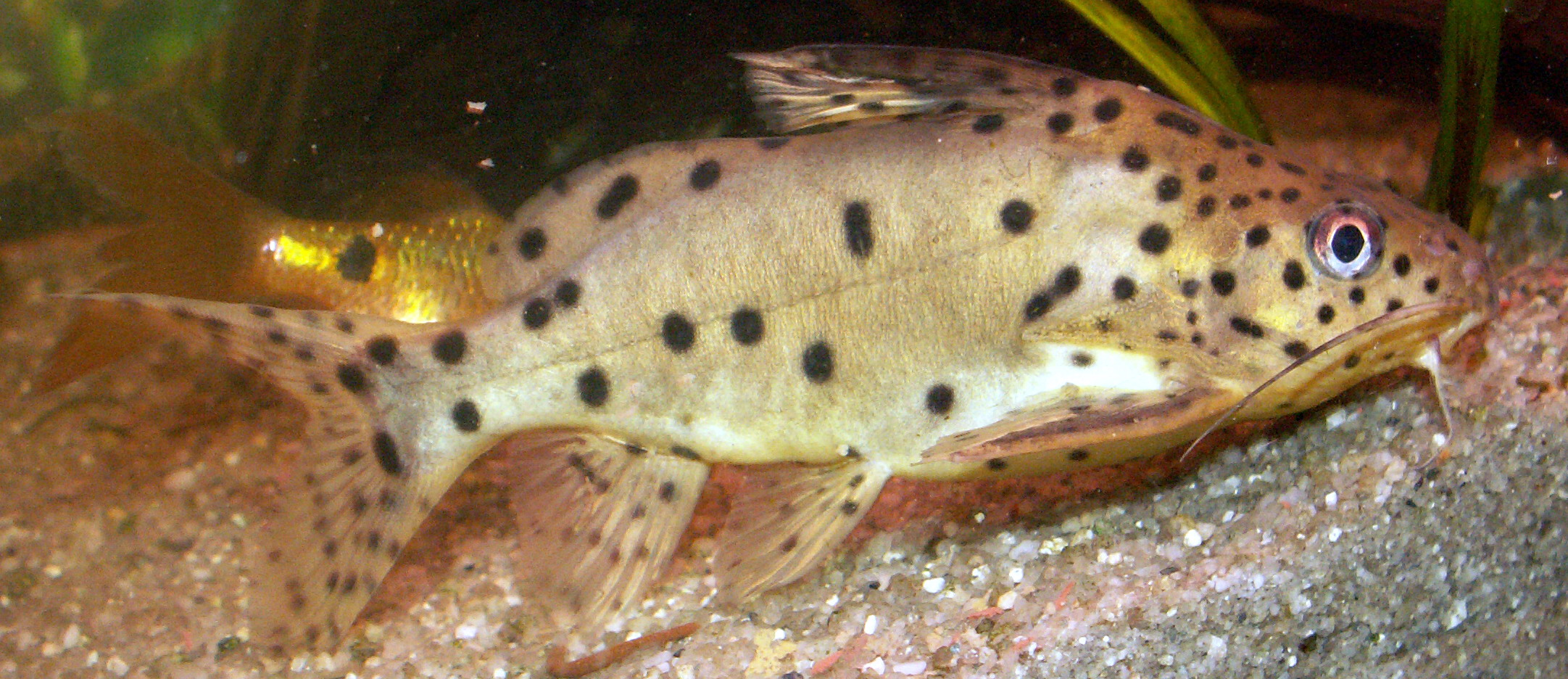
- Synodontis njassae

Scientific classification
- Kingdom: Animalia
- Phylum: Chordata
- Class: Actinopterygii
- Division: Teleostei
- Order: Siluriformes
- Superfamily: Doradoidea
- Family: Mochokidae; Jordan, 1923

Genera
- Acanthocleithron; Atopochilus; Atopodontus; Chiloglanis; Euchilichthys; Microsynodontis; Mochokiella; Mochokus; Synodontis

= Mochokidae =

Family of fishes

The Mochokidae are a family of catfishes (order Siluriformes) that are known as the squeakers or upside-down catfish (although not all species swim upside-down). Nine genera and about 200 species of mochokids are described, all of which are freshwater species originating from Africa.

Member of this family have three pairs of barbels, with the nasal barbels absent; sometimes, the mandibular barbels may be branched. The lips are modified into a suckermouth in Atopochilus, Chiloglanis, and Euchilichthys. The adipose fin is usually very long. The dorsal and pectoral fins have spines that are usually strong and with a locking mechanism. They range in size up to 72 cm (28 in) standard length. This group contains many popular species among aquarists, such as Synodontis nigriventris, Synodontis angelicus, and Synodontis multipunctatus.
