= Lamprologus lethops =

Conservation status
- Data Deficient (IUCN 3.1)

Scientific classification
- Kingdom: Animalia
- Phylum: Chordata
- Class: Actinopterygii
- Division: Teleostei
- Order: Cichliformes
- Family: Cichlidae
- Genus: Lamprologus
- Species: L. lethops

Binomial name
- Lamprologus lethops T. R. Roberts & D. J. Stewart, 1976
- IUCN distribution of Lamprologus lethops Extant (resident) Probably extant (resident)

Species of fish

Lamprologus lethops is a species of cichlid fish from areas with fast current in the Congo River in Central Africa, where it is believed to live in depths as great as 160 m (520 ft) or 200 m (660 ft) below the surface. It reaches up to about 12.5 cm (5 in) in standard length, with females being somewhat smaller than males, is all whitish in color (non-pigmented), and essentially blind as adult, as their eyes are covered in a thick layer of skin (only retain a slight sensibility to light). This is entirely unique among cichlids and an adaption to the perpetual darkness of its habitat, similar to the adaptions seen in cavefish. The eyes of juveniles are rudimentary and not covered by skin.

L. lethops is almost only known from the mainstream of the lower Congo River in the vicinity of Bulu; however very small numbers have been found up to 20–30 km (12–19 mi) upstream or downstream from this site. The relatively high number of L. lethops that have been found at Bulu is likely due to the unique features at this site, where fast currents go from deep parts of the river to the upper parts. These may on occasion "catch" a deep water fish and force it up, also resulting in gas-bubble disease due to the rapid change in pressure. Consequently, when found at the surface they are usually already dead or die within minutes, although a minority may be saved by a special method where a needle is used to reduce the internal pressure. Very small numbers have subsequently been kept in aquaria. Based on these, its behavior is essentially similar to that of its "normal-looking" relatives, like L. congoensis. They have laid eggs in aquaria, which however did not hatch.

Among other fish species with similar adaptations (reduced eyes and non-pigmented) found in similar habitats in the Congo River are an elephantfish (Stomatorhinus microps), a clariid catfish (Gymnallabes nops), a mochokid catfish (Chiloglanis sp.), two claroteid catfish (Notoglanidium pallidum and Platyallabes tihoni), and four spiny eels (Mastacembelus aviceps, M. brichardi, M. crassus and M. latens). The closely related Lamprologus tigripictilis lives in shallow water in the exact same region as L. lethops, but it has normal pigmentation and eyes.
