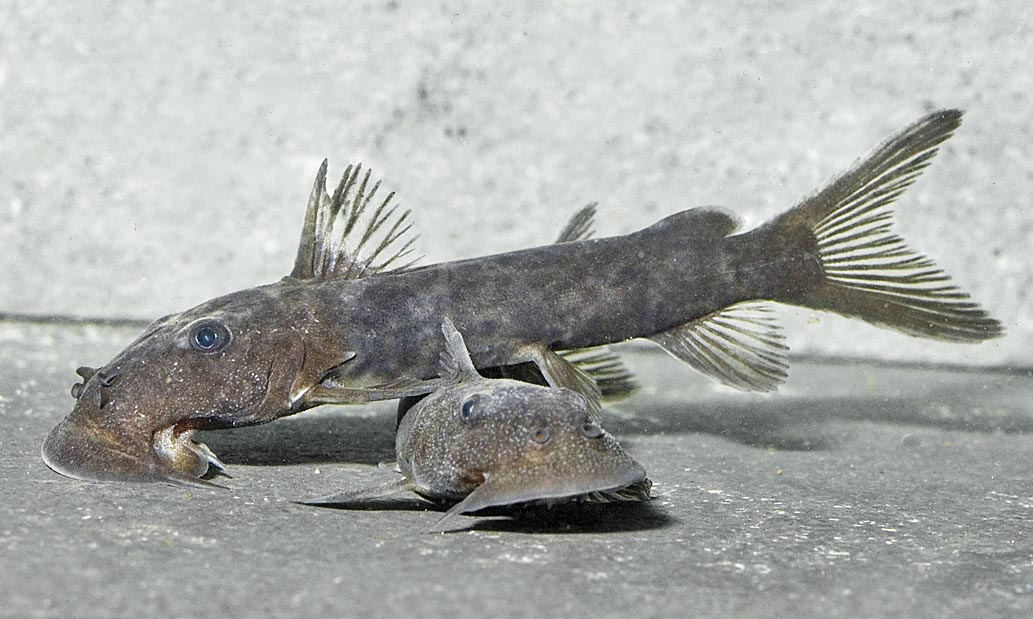

Scientific classification
- Kingdom: Animalia
- Phylum: Chordata
- Class: Actinopterygii
- Order: Siluriformes
- Family: Mochokidae
- Genus: Euchilichthys; Boulenger, 1900

Type species
- Atopochilus guentheri Schilthuis, 1891

= Euchilichthys =

Genus of fishes

Euchilichthys is a genus of upside-down catfishes native to the Congo River Basin in Middle Africa.

== Species ==
There are currently five recognized species in this genus:

- Euchilichthys astatodon (Pellegrin, 1928)
- Euchilichthys boulengeri Nichols & La Monte, 1934
- Euchilichthys dybowskii (Vaillant, 1892)
- Euchilichthys guentheri (Schilthuis, 1891)
- Euchilichthys royauxi Boulenger, 1902

== Description ==
Euchilichthys species have the lips and part of the barbels modified into a suckermouth.
