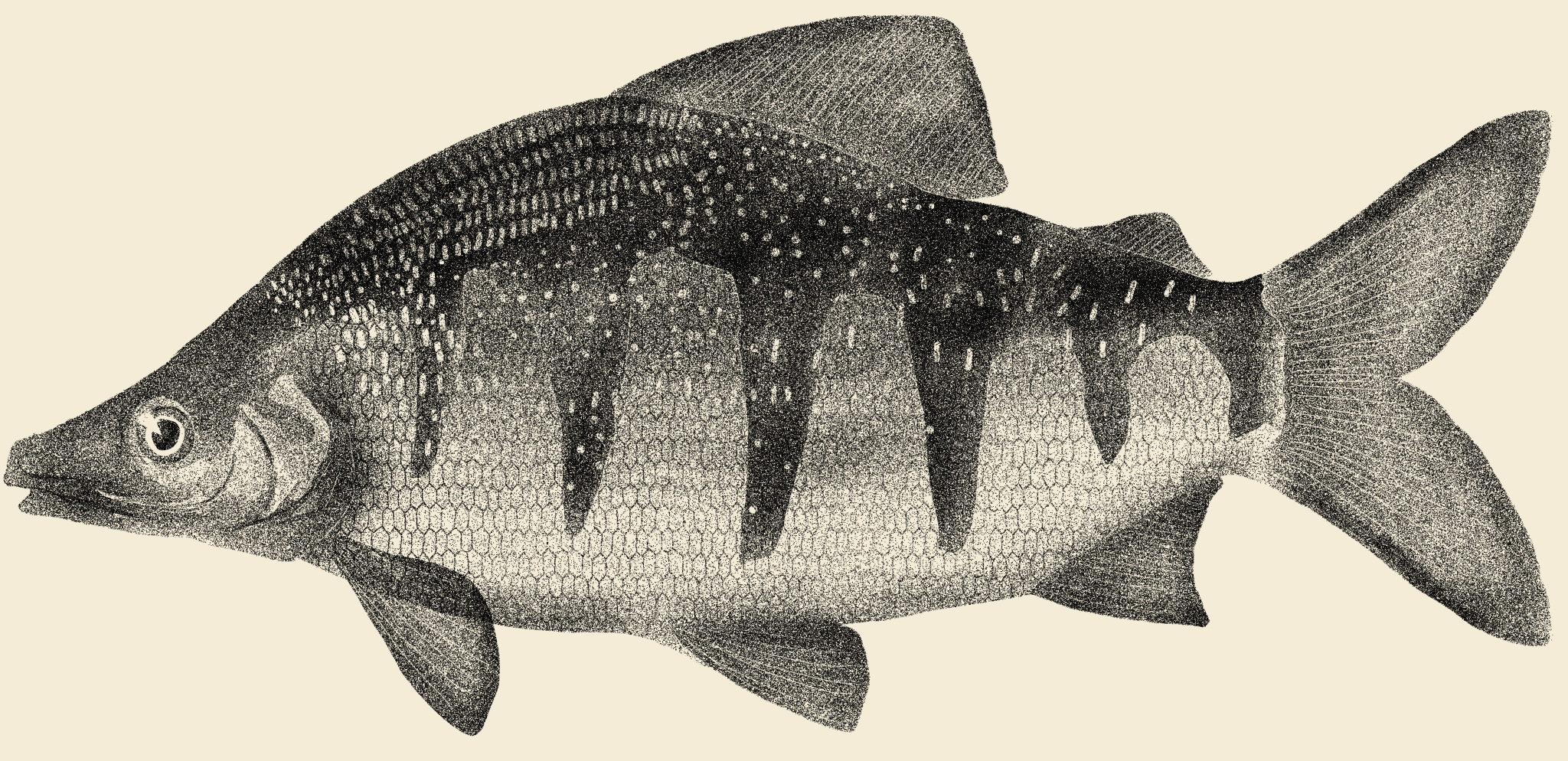

Conservation status
- Least Concern (IUCN 3.1)

Scientific classification
- Kingdom: Animalia
- Phylum: Chordata
- Class: Actinopterygii
- Order: Characiformes
- Family: Distichodontidae
- Genus: Distichodus
- Species: D. lusosso

Binomial name
- Distichodus lusosso Schilthuis, 1891
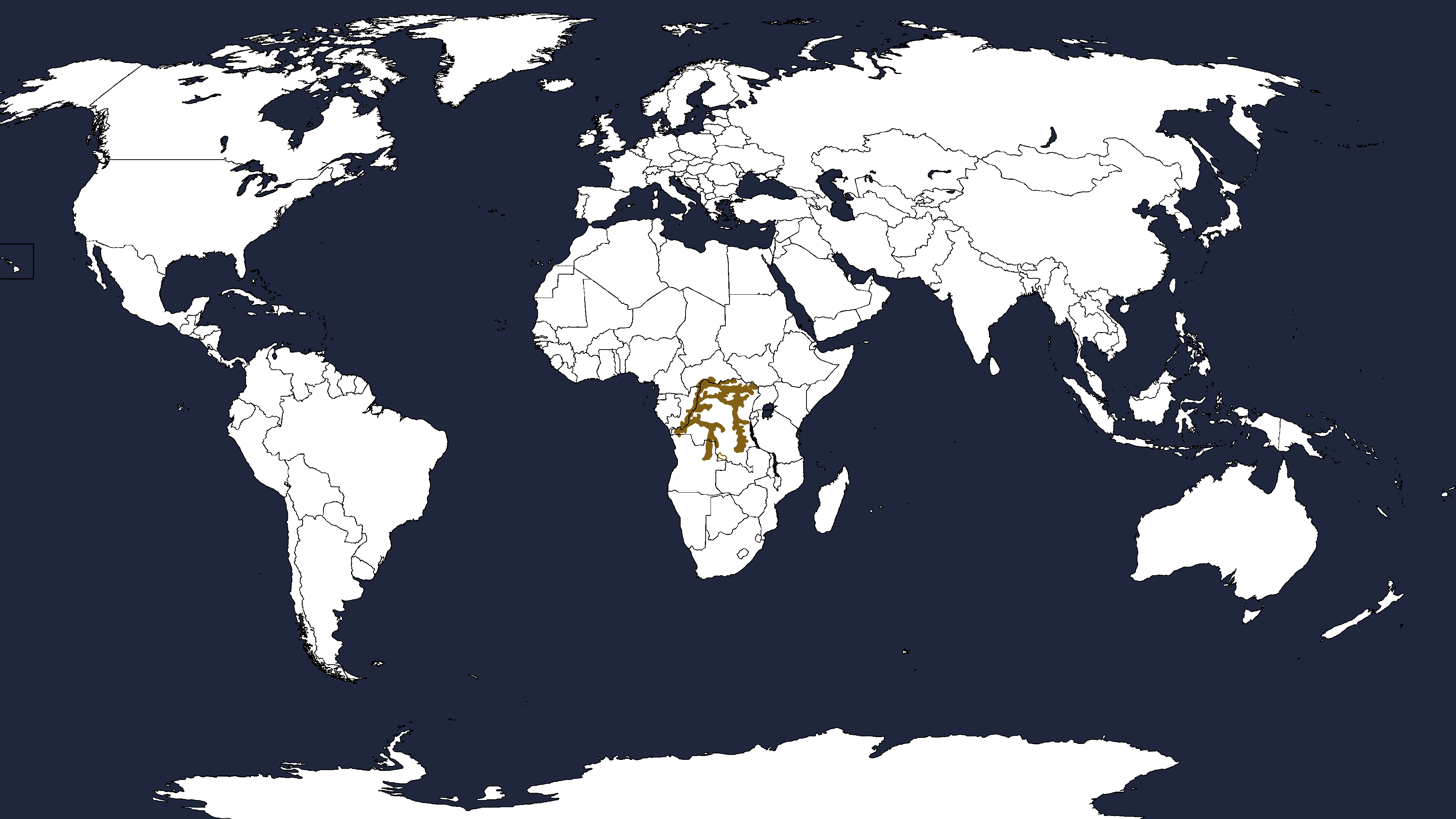

Synonyms
- Distichodus leptorhynchus Boulenger, 1897

= Longsnout distichodus =

Species of old world Characin

The longsnout distichodus (Distichodus lusosso) is an African characin in the family Distichodontidae.

== Description ==
It is a relatively large and well-built fish, attaining a maximum length of 38 cm (15 in). The body is a golden colour (most prominent in juveniles) with several vertical dark bands. Its back is well-arched, and it has reddish fins. The most defining feature of this species is its particularly long head, from which it earns its name.
