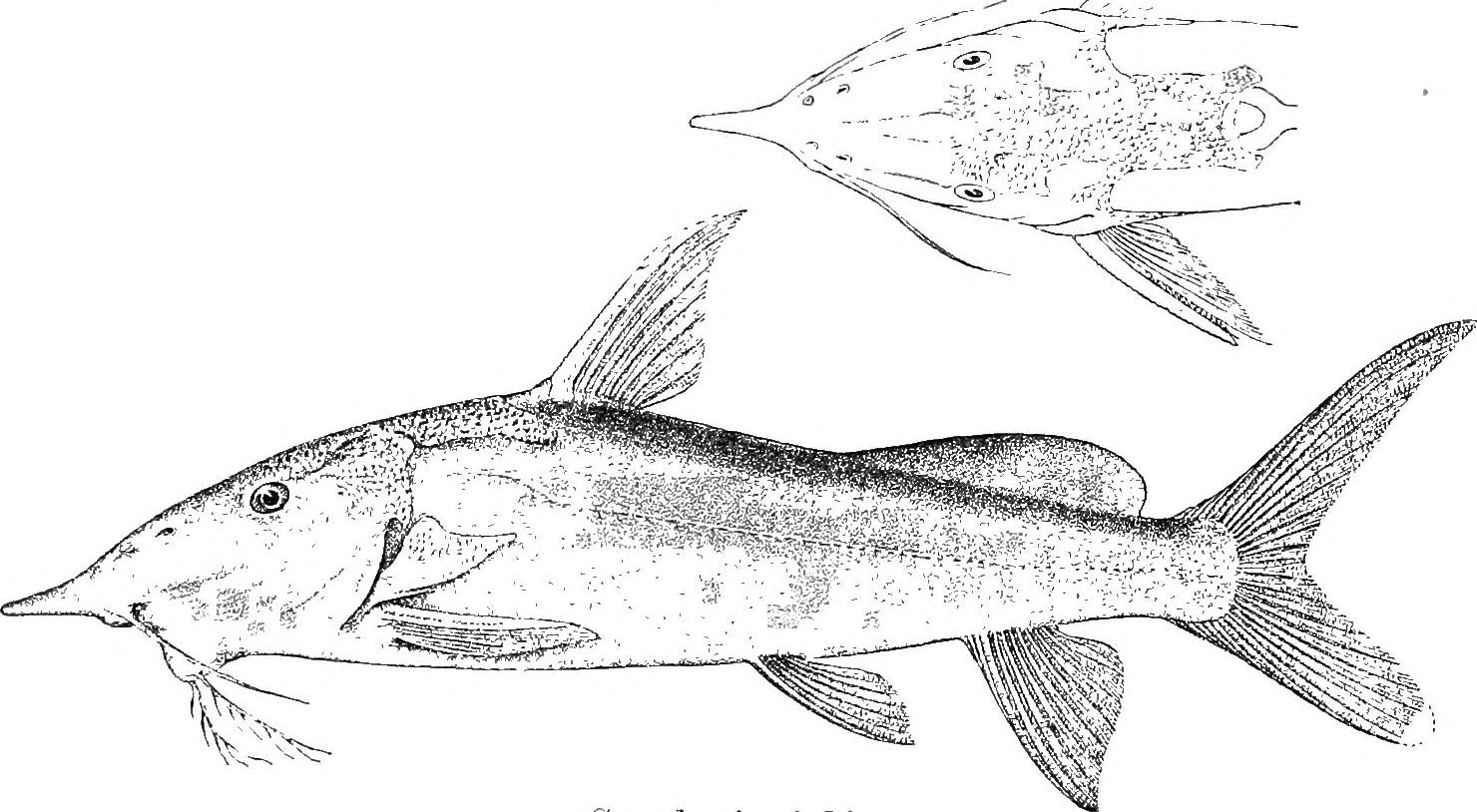

Conservation status
- Least Concern (IUCN 3.1)

Scientific classification
- Domain: Eukaryota
- Kingdom: Animalia
- Phylum: Chordata
- Class: Actinopterygii
- Order: Siluriformes
- Family: Mochokidae
- Genus: Synodontis
- Species: S. greshoffi

Binomial name
- Synodontis greshoffi Schilthuis, 1891

= Synodontis greshoffi =

Species of fish

Synodontis greshoffi is a species of upside-down catfish native to the Congo Basin of Cameroon, the Democratic Republic of the Congo and the Republic of the Congo. It was first collected by M.A. Greshoff in Pool Malebo on the upper Congo River, and the species was named for him by the author of the first paper written about the species, Belgian ichthyologist Louise Schilthuis, in 1891.

== Description ==
The body of the fish is cream-colored, with brown to folden markings on the sides which continue on the ventral surface. The complexity of the pattern increases on the head. The fins are clear with brown spots.brownish or orange-brown and is marked with yellow and dark brown horizontal bands.

Like other members of the genus, this fish has a humeral process, which is a bony spike that is attached to a hardened head cap on the fish and can be seen extending beyond the gill opening. The first ray of the dorsal fin and the pectoral fins have a hardened first ray which is serrated. The caudal fin is deeply forked with an extension on the top lobe. It has short, cone-shaped teeth in the upper jaw. In the lower jaw, the teeth are s-shaped and movable. The fish has one pair of maxillary barbels, and two pairs of mandibular barbels that are often branched.

This species grows to a length of 23 centimetres (9.1 in) SL although specimens up to 26.6 centimetres (10.5 in) TL have been recorded in nature.

== Habitat ==
In the wild, the species inhabits tropical waters with a temperature range of 23 to 27 °C (73 to 81 °F), and has been found in the lower and middle Congo River basin. It has also been found in the upper Congo River basin, excluding the Luapula River and Lake Mweru. It has also been reported in portions of the Boumba River and the Doumé River in southern Cameroon.
