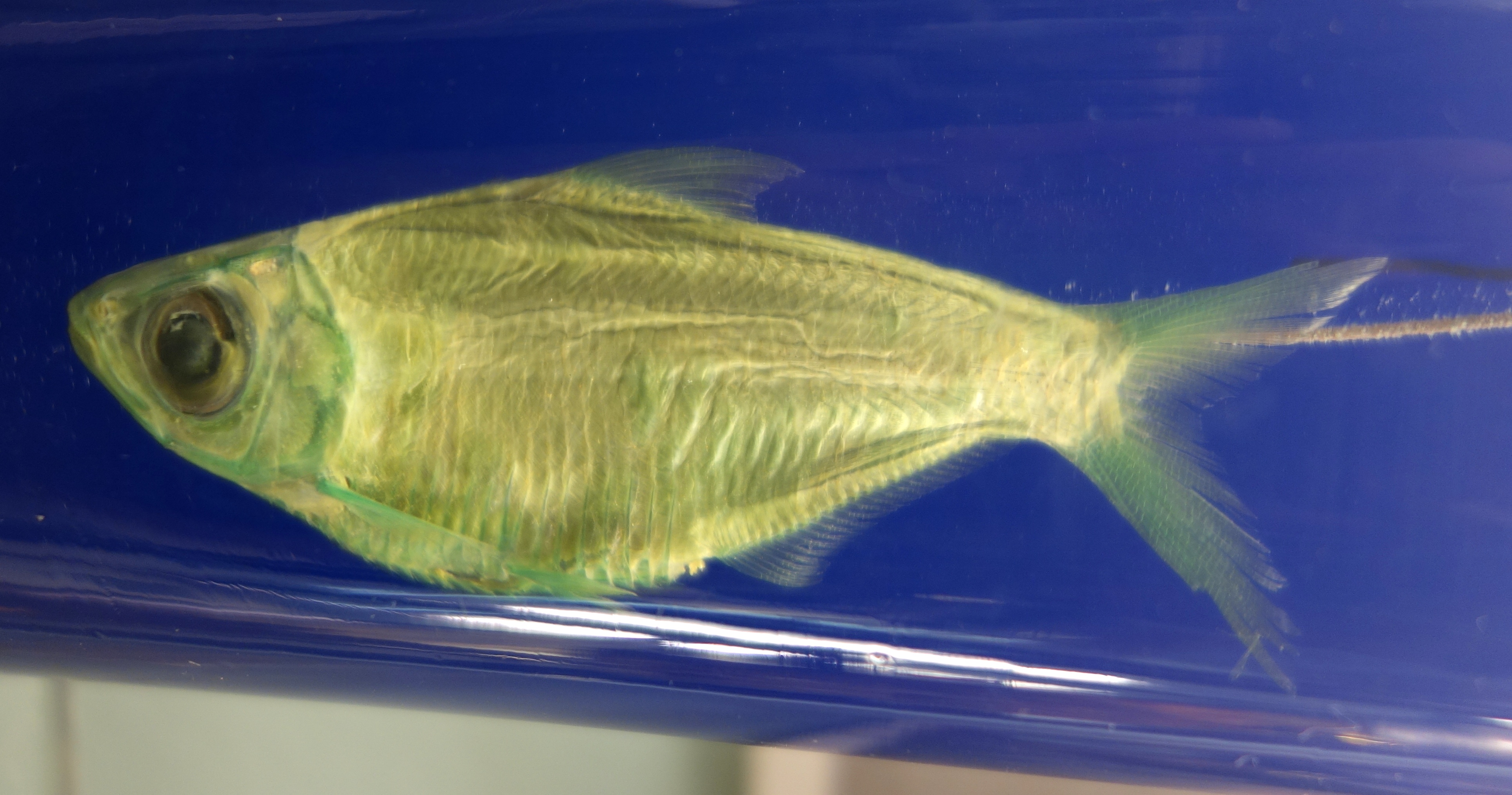
- Mounted specimen of Microthrissa royauxi in the Royal Museum for Central Africa

Conservation status
- Least Concern (IUCN 3.1)

Scientific classification
- Kingdom: Animalia
- Phylum: Chordata
- Class: Actinopterygii
- Order: Clupeiformes
- Family: Dorosomatidae
- Genus: Microthrissa
- Species: M. royauxi

Binomial name
- Microthrissa royauxi Boulenger, 1902)

Synonyms
- Pellonula royauxi Boulenger, 1902

= Microthrissa royauxi =

Species of fish

Microthrissa royauxi, the royal sprat, is a species of pelagic, freshwater fish from the herring family Clupeidae which is found in the Congo River basin in west Africa. It was described in 1902 by the Belgian-British zoologist George Albert Boulenger. It is of limited importance as a food fish in subsistence fisheries and its conservation status is Least Concern.

== Naming and taxonomy ==
Microthrissa royauxi was named by George Albert Boulenger in 1902 from specimens taken in the Ubangi. Its name is from micro small and thrissa from the Greek word for a type of anchovy. The specific name royauxi is in honor of Capitaine Louis Joseph Royaux (1866–1936), who led the expedition that collected the type specimen and supplied indigenous names of many of the species the expedition collected. It is the type species of the genus Microthrissa.

== Description ==
Microthrissa royauxi is a small fish with a rather deep body, the height of the body being roughly a third of the length with a fairly pointed snout, lacking a projecting lower jaw. It has strongly keeled scutes 1 or 2 rows before the base of the first pectoral fin ray. In this and other species of West African freshwater clupeid the jaw anatomy is important in identification and this species has rather narrow jaws compared to its relatives. The maximum length is 9.9 cm,. although 8 cm appears to be the average length.

== Distribution ==
Microthrissa royauxi is found in the middle Congo River basin, including the Ubangi system but not the Kasai, it has been recorded from the Democratic Republic of the Congo, Congo, Central African Republic and Cameroon. This species has been recorded from Pool Malebo (Stanley Pool) and the central Congo River basin, as well as the Lualaba River at Kindu.

== Evolution ==
The clupeids are largely marine, the sub-family that Microthrissa royauxi is a member of, the Pellonulinae, are common in southern and western Africa, for example Limnothrissa miodon in Lake Tanganyika and Potamothrissa acuitirostris in the Congo Basin. Molecular phylogenetic reconstructions indicate that the ancestors of these freshwater Pellonulines colonised West Africa 25–50 million years ago, at the end of a major marine incursion in the region. Pellonuline herring subsequently speciated in an evolutionary radiation in West Africa, and spread across the continent and colonising its freshwater bodies.

== Habitat ==
Microthrissa royauxi is a pelagic fish of large rivers.

== Fisheries ==
Microthrissa royauxi makes a small contribution to the catches of local fishermen, it is caught mainly by subsistence fishermen.
