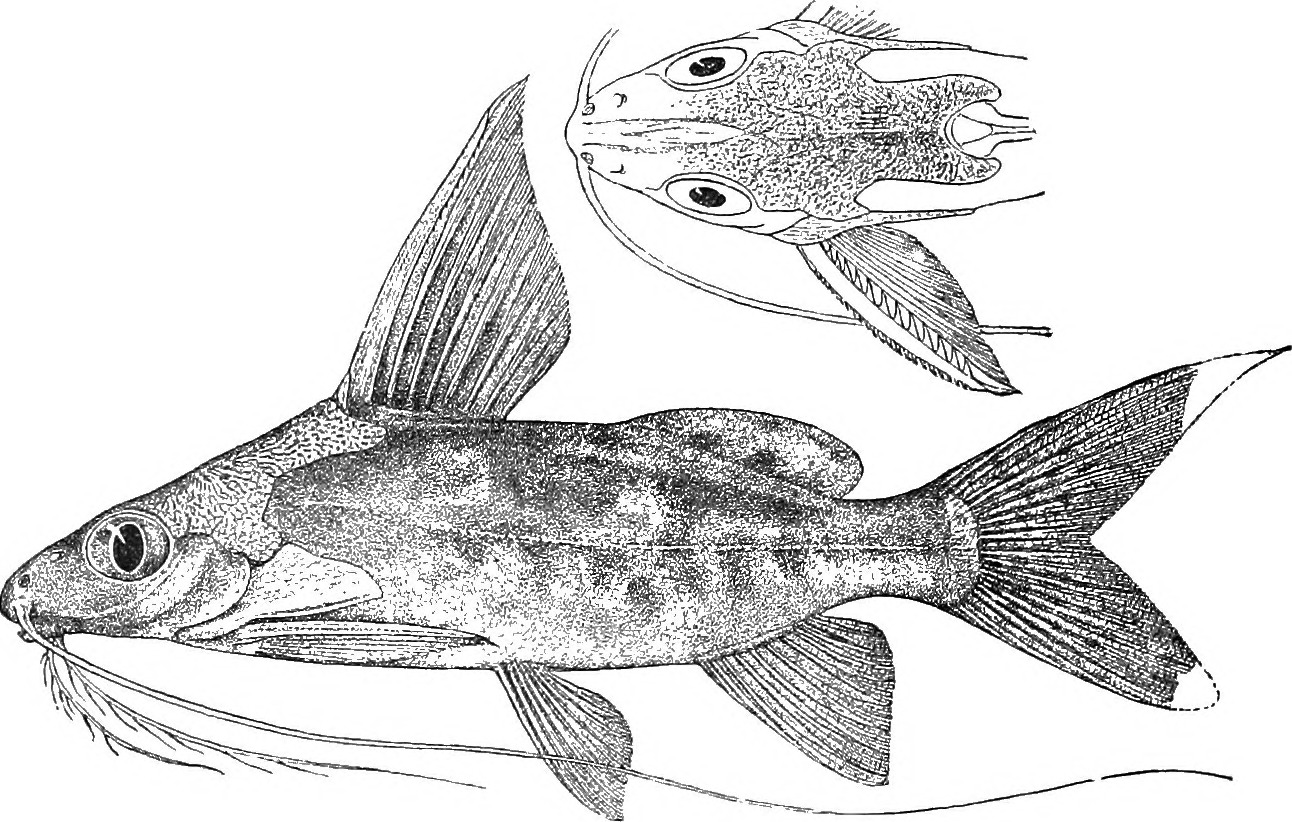

Conservation status
- Least Concern (IUCN 3.1)

Scientific classification
- Kingdom: Animalia
- Phylum: Chordata
- Class: Actinopterygii
- Order: Siluriformes
- Family: Mochokidae
- Genus: Synodontis
- Species: S. alberti

Binomial name
- Synodontis alberti Schilthuis, 1891

= Synodontis alberti =

Species of fish

Synodontis alberti, the bigeye squeaker, Albert's syno, bigspotted squeaker, or high-fin synodontis, is a species of upside-down catfish native to the Congo Basin of Cameroon, the Democratic Republic of the Congo and the Republic of the Congo. It was originally described in 1891 by Belgian ichthyologist Louise Schilthuis after its discovery in the Malebo Pool of the Congo River.

== Description ==
The fish is grey to brown in color and is covered in small dark spots. In females, the spots fade and the body color fades to greyish-brown, but adult males retain their spotted pattern.

Like other members of the genus, this fish has a humeral process, which is a bony spike that is attached to a hardened head cap on the fish and can be seen extending beyond the gill opening. The first ray of the dorsal fin and the pectoral fins have a hardened first ray which is serrated. The caudal fin is deeply forked with an extension on the top lobe. The dorsal and caudal fins are elongated, and grow longer with age. It has short, cone-shaped teeth in the upper jaw. In the lower jaw, the teeth are s-shaped and movable. The fish has one pair of extremely long maxillary barbels, and two pairs of mandibular barbels that are often branched.

This species grows to a length of 16 centimetres (6.3 in) SL although specimens up to 20.3 centimetres (8.0 in) TL have been recorded in nature.

In the wild, the species inhabits tropical waters with a temperature range of 23 to 27 °C (73 to 81 °F), a pH of 6.0 – 8.0, and dH range of 4-25. Its natural diet includes benthic algae and weeds, insects, and worms.

== In the Aquarium ==
The species is commercially sold as an aquarium fish.
