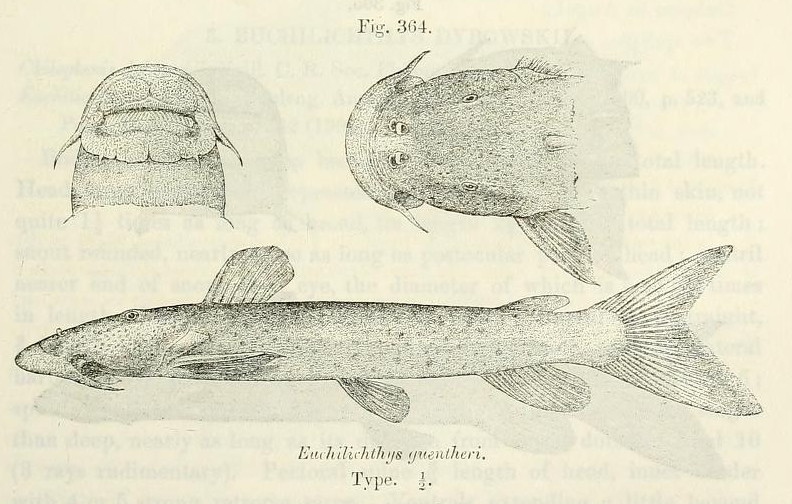

Conservation status
- Least Concern (IUCN 3.1)

Scientific classification
- Domain: Eukaryota
- Kingdom: Animalia
- Phylum: Chordata
- Class: Actinopterygii
- Order: Siluriformes
- Family: Mochokidae
- Genus: Euchilichthys
- Species: E. guentheri

Binomial name
- Euchilichthys guentheri (Schilthuis, 1891)

= Euchilichthys guentheri =

Species of fish

Euchilichthys guentheri is a species of upside-down catfish native to the Congo Basin of the Democratic Republic of the Congo, the Republic of the Congo and Zambia. This species grows to a length of 19 centimetres (7.5 in) TL.
