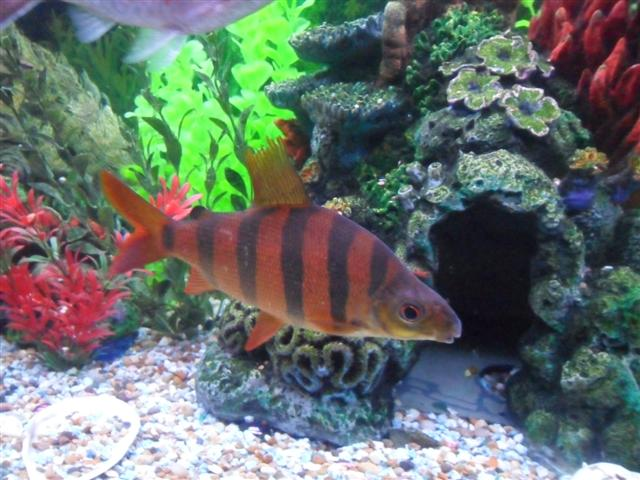
- Distichodus sexfasciatus

Scientific classification
- Kingdom: Animalia
- Phylum: Chordata
- Class: Actinopterygii
- Division: Teleostei
- Order: Characiformes
- Family: Distichodontidae
- Genus: Distichodus; J. P. Müller & Troschel, 1844

Type species
- Characinus nefasch Lacépède, 1803

Synonyms
- Distichodomicrura Fowler, 1936; Distichodomicrura Fowler, 1936

= Distichodus =

Genus of fishes

Distichodus is a genus of freshwater ray-finned fish belonging to the family Distichodontidae, native to Africa. Distichodus of all sizes feed on plant matter, consuming both periphyton and macrophytes (such as Echinochloa pyramidalis), though some species such as D. lusosso are generalists, also feeding on aquatic invertebrates and fish. Some dietary shift is seen between the wet and dry seasons.

== Species ==
Distichodus contains the following valid species:

- Distichodus affinis Günther, 1873 (Silver distichodus)
- Distichodus altus Boulenger, 1899
- Distichodus antonii Schilthuis, 1891
- Distichodus atroventralis Boulenger, 1898
- Distichodus decemmaculatus Pellegrin, 1926 (Dwarf distichodus)
- Distichodus engycephalus Günther, 1864
- Distichodus fasciolatus Boulenger, 1898 (Sharktail distichodus)
- Distichodus hypostomatus Pellegrin, 1900
- Distichodus ingae Moelants & Snoeks, 2018
- Distichodus kasaiensis Vreven, Moelants & Snoeks, 2018
- Distichodus kolleri Holly 1926
- Distichodus langi Nichols & Griscom, 1917
- Distichodus lusosso Schilthuis, 1891 (Longsnout distichodus)
- Distichodus maculatus Boulenger, 1898 (Spotted citharinid)
- Distichodus mbiniensis Schmidt, Knobloch & Barrientos, 2021
- Distichodus microps Schmidt, Knobloch & Barrientos, 2021
- Distichodus mossambicus Peters, 1852 (Nkupe)
- Distichodus nefasch (Bonnaterre, 1788)
- Distichodus noboli Boulenger, 1899
- Distichodus notospilus Günther, 1867
- Distichodus petersii Pfeffer, 1896
- Distichodus polli Abwe, Snoeks, Manda & Vreven, 2019.
- Distichodus rostratus Günther, 1864
- Distichodus rufigiensis Norman, 1922 (Grass eater)
- Distichodus schenga Peters, 1852 (Chessa)
- Distichodus sexfasciatus Boulenger, 1897 (Banded distichodus)
- Distichodus teugelsi Mamonekene & Vreven 2008

The following cladogram is based on a 2020 phylogenetic study of Distichodus genetics:

- Paradistichodus dimidiatus
- Distichodus
  - - Distichodus hypostomatus
    - - Distichodus maculatus
      - - - - Distichodus notospilus
            - Distichodus kolleri
          - - Distichodus affinis
            - Distichodus altus
        - - Distichodus noboli
          - - Distichodus teugelsi
            - - Distichodus teugelsi
              - Distichodus decemmaculatus
  - - - Distichodus petersii
      - - Distichodus nefasch
        - Distichodus rostratus
    - - Distichodus engycephalus
      - - - Distichodus fasciolatus
          - - Distichodus fasciolatus
            - Distichodus schenga
        - - Distichodus atroventralis
          - - Distichodus lusosso
            - - Distichodus kasaiensis
              - - Distichodus antonii
                - Distichodus sexfasciatus
