= Milana Terloeva =

Milana Bakhaeva
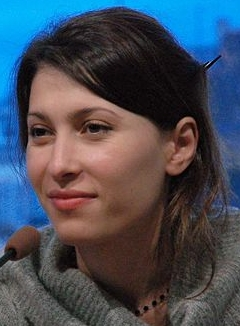
- Milana Bakhaeva in 2008
- Born: 30 December 1979 (age 46); Yandi, Achkhoy-Martanovsky District, Chechen-Ingush ASSR, Soviet Union
- Occupations: Journalist, author
- Writing career
- Pen name: Milana Terloeva
- Period: 2006–present
- Genre: Nonfiction
- Subjects: First and Second Chechen Wars, Chechen society

Milana Zaydinovna Bakhaeva (Russian: Милана Зайдиновна Бахаева) (born 30 December 1979 in Yandi, Achkhoy-Martanovsky District, Chechnya), better known by the pen name Milana Terloeva, is a Chechen journalist and author of the 2006 French bestseller Danser sur les ruines – Une jeunesse tchétchène. A refugee during the Second Chechen War, Milana was one of eight Chechen students at the University of Grozny selected to study abroad by the human rights organization Études Sans Frontières in 2003, and she graduated with a master's degree in journalism from the Institut d'Études Politiques de Paris in 2006.

== Biography ==
Milana was born in the small village of Yandi, Achkhoy-Martanovsky District, sixty kilometers west of the Chechen capital Grozny and near the border of Ingushetia, and she lived with her parents and grandmother, who had survived the forced deportations of most Chechens to Central Asia on 23 February 1944. As a child growing up in the Soviet Union, the family was relatively well-off, but suffered due to the spiraling increase in crime after the dissolution of the Soviet Union. One night in January 1993, someone left a large iron case outside the family doorstep. Inside was the body of Milana's father, assassinated.

After the beginning of the First Chechen War on 11 December 1994, Milana and her family first took refuge in their cellar, and lived without running water or electricity. As the situation in her village worsened further, her family took refuge in Grozny, which had already been ruined following the siege of the city. The family returned to Orekhovo at the end of the war in 1996, and they found that their homes had been extensively looted, and Russian soldiers living in her house had soiled everything with their excrement, including her prized ball gown, in an effort to humiliate them.

With the start of the Second Chechen War, Milana and her family sought refuge in Ingushetia along with hundreds of thousands of other refugees. She returned to Grozny six months later, and enrolled in the heavily damaged University of Grozny, studying the French language. She aspired to become a journalist so that she would be able to bring justice to victims of the conflict. A group of French students opposed to the new war in Chechnya started the organization Etudes Sans Frontières in March 2003 as a means for rescuing Chechen students from the war zone and providing them with a French education. (In 1997, Chechen President Aslan Maskhadov appealed to Western nations to allow Chechen students into their universities, as he dreamed of liberally oriented leaders who would be capable of rebuilding a society that had been destroyed by war. The call fell on deaf ears, and at the time only madrassas from Saudi Arabia and Pakistan opened their doors to Chechens). By that September, the organization had sponsored eight Chechen students, including Milana, to study in Paris.

As a journalism student at Institut d'Études Politiques de Paris, Milana excelled academically, graduating in 2006. She also worked at the internationally circulated French newspapers Le Monde and Courrier International in August 2004. She also befriended the late journalist Anna Politkovskaya. Hachette Livre, the largest publishing house in France, contacted Milana to write about her experiences during the wars, and she wrote her autobiography, Danser sur les ruines – Une jeunesse tchétchène (Dancing on Ruins – A Chechen Youth), which describes the raids in which many of her family members were captured, her journey from Grozny to Paris, and of her experiences as a student at Sciences Po.

Despite numerous job offers in Paris, Milana decided to return to Grozny, to open up an independent newspaper, but realized that she would be unable to because of current censorship and death threats. As of 2007, she was working on creating a European cultural center in Chechnya, and writing a second book on Chechen women. She later worked for Memorial, and was arrested and detained in 2008 for her work with the group. She fled to the United States after receiving threats for her work.

== Works ==
- Terloeva, Milana (13 September 2006). Danser sur les ruines (in French). Hachette Littératures. ISBN 978-2-01-237760-8.
