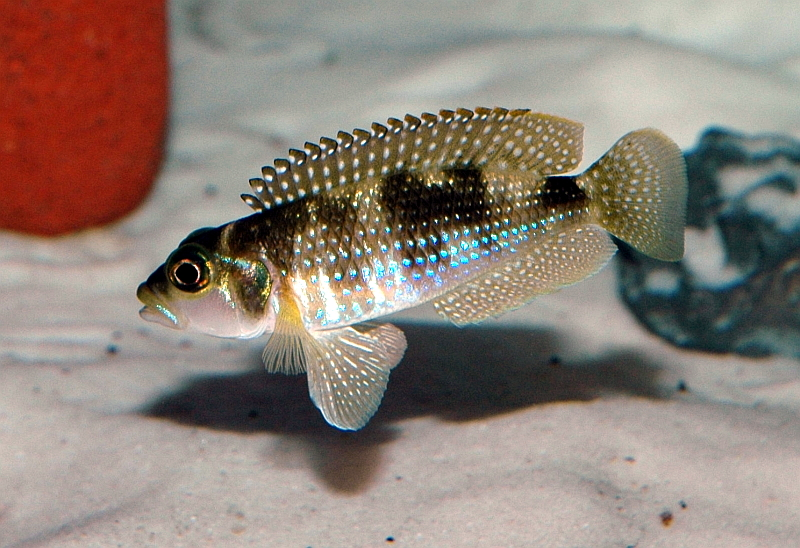
- Lamprologus meleagris

Scientific classification
- Kingdom: Animalia
- Phylum: Chordata
- Class: Actinopterygii
- Division: Teleostei
- Order: Cichliformes
- Family: Cichlidae
- Tribe: Lamprologini
- Genus: Lamprologus; Schilthuis, 1891

Type species
- Lamprologus congoensis Schilthuis, 1891

= Lamprologus =

Genus of fishes

Lamprologus is a genus of fishes from the cichlid family. They are native to Lake Tanganyika (where several species are shell dwellers) and the Congo River Basin in Africa. The type species for this genus is Lamprologus congoensis, a species from the Congo River. The genus is under some revision and may eventually be restricted to these riverine types.

== Species ==
There are currently nine recognized species in this genus:

- Lamprologus congoensis Schilthuis, 1891
- Lamprologus lethops T. R. Roberts & D. J. Stewart, 1976
- Lamprologus markerti Tougas & Stiassny, 2014
- Lamprologus mocquardi Pellegrin, 1903
- Lamprologus symoensi Poll, 1976
- Lamprologus teugelsi Schelly & Stiassny, 2004
- Lamprologus tigripictilis Schelly & Stiassny, 2004
- Lamprologus tumbanus Boulenger, 1899
- Lamprologus werneri Poll, 1959
