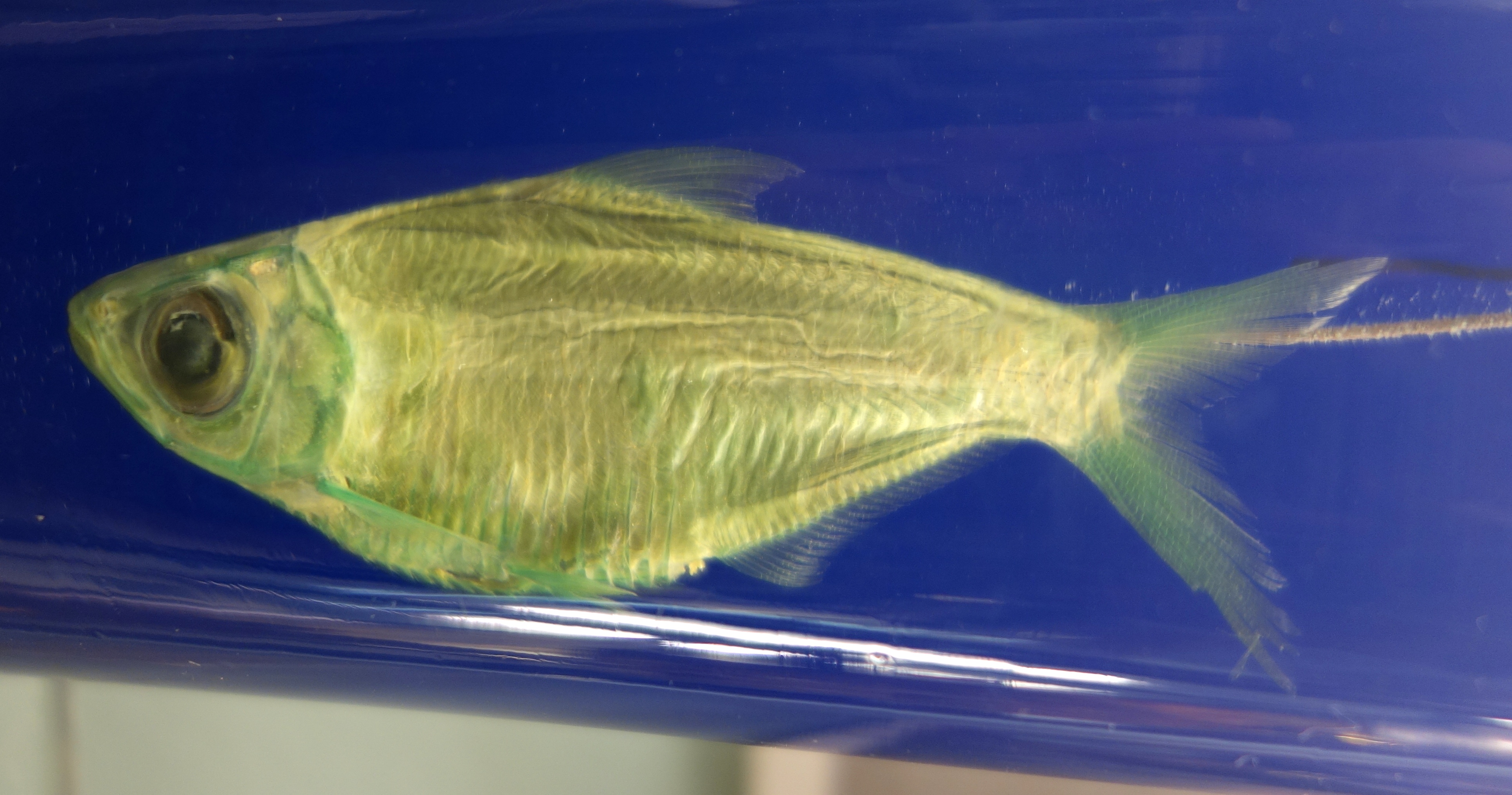
- Microthrissa royauxi

Scientific classification
- Kingdom: Animalia
- Phylum: Chordata
- Class: Actinopterygii
- Order: Clupeiformes
- Family: Dorosomatidae
- Genus: Microthrissa; Boulenger, 1902

Type species
- Microthrissa royauxi Boulenger, 1902

= Microthrissa =

Genus of fishes

Microthrissa is a genus of freshwater ray-finned fishes belonging to the family Dorosomatidae, which also includes the gizzard shads and sardinellas. The species in this genus are endemic to Africa.

== Species ==
Microthrissa contains the following valid species:

- Microthrissa centralis (Poll, 1974)
- Microthrissa congica (Regan, 1917) (Bigscale pellonuline)
- Microthrissa minuta Poll, 1974 (Dungu sprat)
- Microthrissa moeruensis (Poll, 1948) (Lake Mweru sprat)
- Microthrissa royauxi Boulenger, 1902 (Royal sprat)
- Microthrissa whiteheadi Gourène & Teugels, 1988
