= Kindu atrocity =

1961 murder of Italian ONUC airmen in Kindu, present-day DR Congo

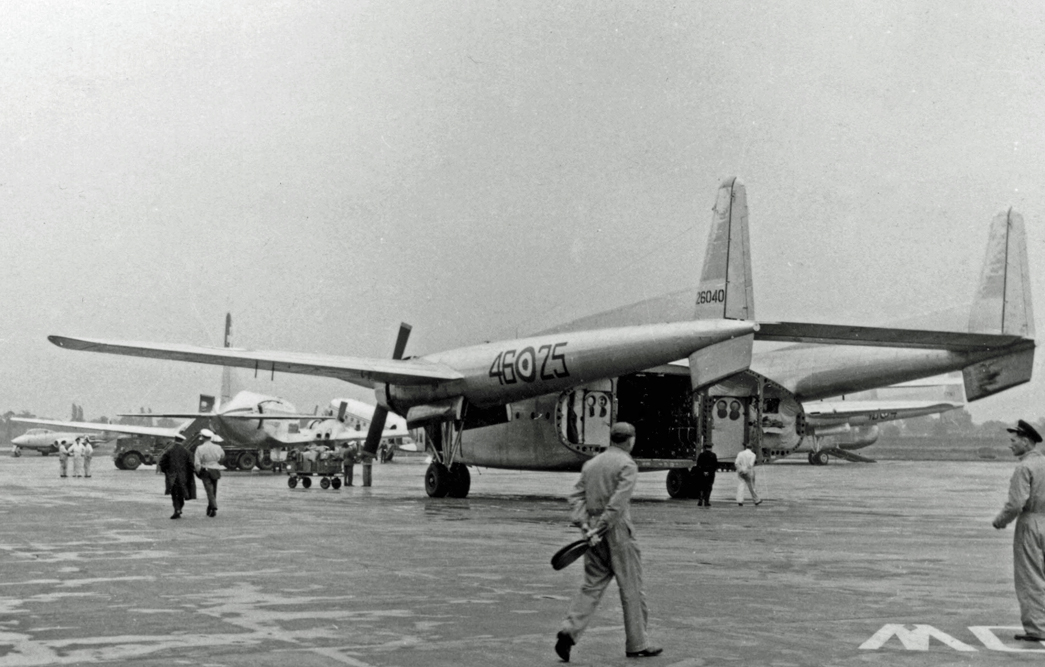
A Fairchild C-119G of the Italian 46ª Aerobrigata

The Kindu massacre, or Kindu atrocity, took place on 11 November 1961 in Kindu Port-Émpain, in the Congo-Léopoldville (the former Belgian Congo). Thirteen Italian airmen who were members of the United Nations Operation in the Congo who were sent to deal with the Congo Crisis were killed and partially eaten by locals.

The Italian aviators manned two C-119s, twin-engine transport aircraft known as Flying Boxcars, of the 46ª Aerobrigata based at Pisa Airfield.

== Background ==
The DR Congo was known to have vast natural resources including, but not limited to, copper, tantalum, cobalt, gold, and diamonds. In order to gain control of these resources, Belgium (backed by other European powers) colonized the DRC in the mid-1800s and oversaw a brutal regime of abuse, slavery, and resource extraction. After protests, democratic movements, increasing cost, and international pressure made their continued position untenable, Belgium agreed to a transition to Congolese self-governance. Belgium left Congo-Léopoldville (today known as the Democratic Republic of the Congo) as agreed but political and administrative chaos ensued. Major Cold War and financial interests played a part in making the situation even more serious by favoring the secession of two regions, South Kasai and Katanga. Katanga was the richest province in the country with important mining activity.

Three factions were involved: Joseph Kasa-Vubu's, with troops led by General Joseph-Désiré Mobutu, the pro-Lumumba faction led by Antoine Gizenga with troops under the command of General Victor Lundula holding the eastern province, and Moise Tshombe's Katangan faction, with gendarmes supported by foreign mercenaries.

== The massacre ==
The two Italian aircrews had been operating for a year and a half in the Congo, and their return to Italy was scheduled for November 23, 1961. On the morning of November 11, 1961, the two aircraft took off from the capital city Leopoldville (now Kinshasa) to deliver two Ferret scout cars to the small Malayan United Nations garrison controlling the airfield not far from Kindu, on the edge of the equatorial forest. The arrival of the Italian units had been communicated to the Congolese army, then called ANC.

The aircraft arrived at 1400 hour and the Italian airmen were transported to the Malayan dinning hall. At the time, the ANC was using Kindu as a staging post for troops being sent to Stanleyville with 935 ANC personnel in Kindu On November 11th. Rumors had spread that an airdrop by Tshombe's parachutists was imminent; Gizenga's troops, operating 500 kilometers due south in Northern Katanga, had been bombed by Katangese aircraft for months. The arrival of the two aircraft intensified these fears.

At roughly 1600 hour, forty ANC personnel arrived at the dining hall with 26 entering the building. They accused the Italian personnel of being Tshombe spies. According to declassified UN documents, Maj. Duad of the UN base successfully reasoned with them and the ANC left the dinning hall although, “Immediately after the doors were closed more ANC forced the doors open and when told to stop by Col. Pakassa (colonel of the ANC), he was threatened to be shot if he interfered.” Maj. Duad attempted to reason in French but the ANC member he was speaking to, possibly under the influence of alcohol, claimed he was Belgian, speaking Flemish. The ANC then attacked and beat the Italians with their rifle butts.

During this time, roughly 200 ANC members surrounded the building. The first person to die was Medic Tenente Remotti, who was shot while trying to escape. All other Italian personnel were arrested, taken into vehicles and brought to the local prison. Maj. Duad left with minor injuries and returned to the airfield. A conference was soon called by Maj. Duad with Col. Pakassa and Maj Malungi of the ANC. Maj. Duad demanded the release of the prisoners, the return of any stolen items, and the withdrawal of troops. Despite several more meetings with Col. Pakassa, the demands did not come to fruition as Pakassa had lost control over his troops.

All the Italian prisoners were shot and killed in front of the jail. According to several witnesses, their bodies were then "butchered" or cut up, with parts being distributed among spectators. Some parts were boiled and presumably eaten, as shown by photographs made by one of the witnesses, which depicted the slaughter and partial boiling of one of the captives. Another witness later saw a "human limb", described to him as coming from one of the killed Italians.

The next morning, a police superintendent ordered the remaining parts of the mutilated bodies to be buried at Tokolote cemetery. There they were located in 1962, exhumed, and transported to Italy for reburial.

== United Nations and Congolese response ==
On November 13, General Victor Lundula dispatched two army officials, accompanied by two UN officers, to Kindu to investigate. Colonel Pakassa refused to acknowledge their authority, and claimed that the Italians had escaped his soldiers' custody. Lundula then traveled to Kindu to insist that Pakassa file a formal report on the incident, upon which Pakassa told him that he had no information to share. Lundula and Minister of Interior Christophe Gbenye submitted a formal report on the incident.

The UN reinforced its garrison at Kindu and immediately prepared to disarm the rebellious Congolese soldiers. News of this action infuriated the pro-Gizenga ministers in the central government, leading to violent incidents in Parliament. Prime Minister Cyrille Adoula held a closed session, after which he denounced the UN's actions and declared their investigative commission unnecessary in the face of Lundula's and Gbenye's report. Two days later Officer in charge of UN Operations in the Congo Sture Linner agreed not to disarm the Stanleyville troops. Pokassa was later arrested by Lundula after Gizenga's regime in the eastern Congo collapsed.

A subsequent investigation found human flesh presumed to be from the captives in the possession of two soldiers. A commission set up by the Congolese government and the United Nations Operation in the Congo found these two men, as well as Col. Pakassa and two other ANC members, as definitively guilty of involvement in the massacre, but no court trial followed and no one was ever punished for the murders.

== Commemorations ==
In 1994 the murdered airmen were awarded the Gold Medal of Military Valor.
Listed below are the names of the airmen. (USAF ranks are added for comparison).

- Onorio De Luca, Sottotenente (2nd Lieutenant) pilot, age 25;
- Filippo Di Giovanni, Maresciallo motorista 3° Classe (Master Sergeant engineer) age 42 (a former POW in the US and member of the Torpedo Bomber arm of the Regia Aeronautica in WWII);
- Armando Fabi, Sergente Maggiore (Staff Sergeant) board electrician, age 30;
- Giulio Garbati, Sottotenente (2nd Lieutenant) pilot, age 22;
- Giorgio Gonelli, Capitano (Captain) pilot, age 31, deputy commander;
- Antonio Mamone, Sergente (Airman First Class) wireless operator, age 28;
- Martano Marcacci, Sergente (Airman First Class) board electrician, age 27;
- Nazzareno Quadrumani, Maresciallo 3° Classe (Master Sergeant) engineer, age 42 (born in Montefalco, Perugia). Former member of Regia Aeronautica and Italian Co-Belligerent Air Force;
- Francesco Paga, sergente (Airman First Class) wireless operator, age 31;
- Amedeo Parmeggiani, Maggiore (Major) pilot, age 43, commanding officer of both aircrews; former member of 21° Gruppo Caccia of the Regia Aeronautica and veteran of the Russian, Sicily, and Italian Campaign;
- Silvestro Possenti, sergente maggiore montatore (Staff Sergeant assembly operator), age 40, veteran of Regia Aeronautica and Italian Co-Belligerent Air Force;
- Francesco Paolo Remotti, Tenente (First Lieutenant) medic, age 29;
- Nicola Stigliani, Sergente Maggiore montatore (Staff Sergeant, assembly operator) age 30;

It was not until 2007 that the victims' relatives were awarded compensation. A monument to the Kindu victims can be found at the entrance of Leonardo da Vinci-Fiumicino Airport in Rome, and another was erected in Pisa.

== See also ==
- Cannibalism in Africa § Congo Basin
- List of massacres in the Democratic Republic of the Congo
