= Euchilichthys astatodon =

Conservation status
- Least Concern (IUCN 3.1)

Scientific classification
- Kingdom: Animalia
- Phylum: Chordata
- Class: Actinopterygii
- Order: Siluriformes
- Family: Mochokidae
- Genus: Euchilichthys
- Species: E. astatodon

Binomial name
- Euchilichthys astatodon (Pellegrin, 1928)

Species of fish

Euchilichthys astatodon is a species of upside-down catfish native to Angola and the Democratic Republic of the Congo where it occurs in the Kasai River drainage. This species grows to a length of 18.5 centimetres (7.3 in) TL.
