= Euchilichthys boulengeri =

Conservation status
- Data Deficient (IUCN 3.1)

Scientific classification
- Kingdom: Animalia
- Phylum: Chordata
- Class: Actinopterygii
- Order: Siluriformes
- Family: Mochokidae
- Genus: Euchilichthys
- Species: E. boulengeri

Binomial name
- Euchilichthys boulengeri Nichols & La Monte, 1934

Species of fish

Euchilichthys boulengeri is a species of upside-down catfish endemic to the Democratic Republic of the Congo where it is found in the Lulua River near Kananga. This species grows to a length of 9.7 centimetres (3.8 in) TL.
