= Suckermouth =

Feature of some fish

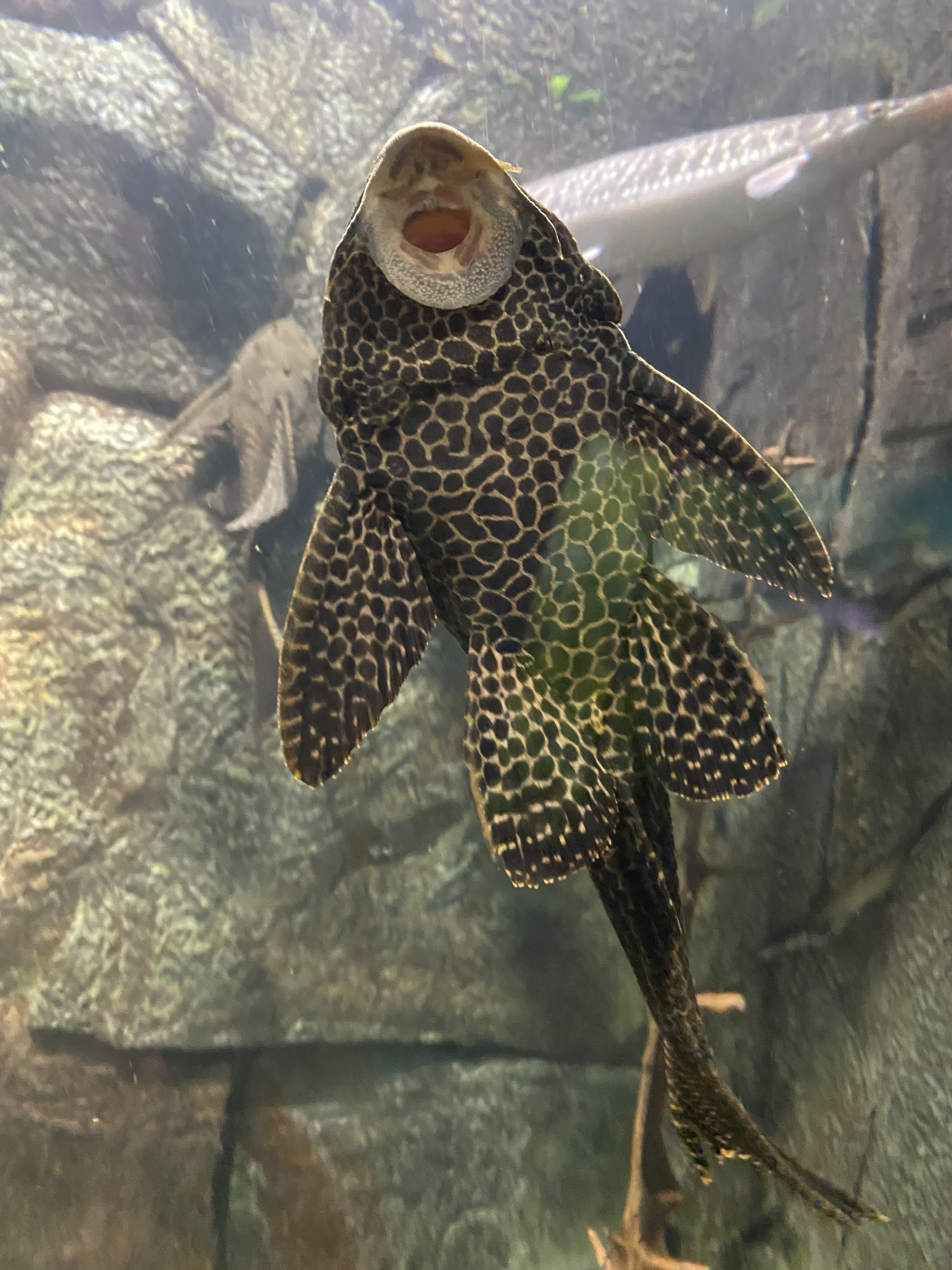
In aquaria, suckermouth catfish adhere to glass using their suckermouths.

In fish, a suckermouth is a ventrally-oriented (inferior) mouth adapted for grazing on algae and small organisms that grow on submerged objects (aufwuchs). In general many benthic dwelling or feeding fish will have a suckermouth feature. Many of these fishes originate from fast-moving waters, where the sucker allows the fish to 'stick' itself down without too much difficulty.

All Loricariidae possess a suckermouth as do the cypriniform algae eaters of the genus Gyrinocheilus and other genera. The 'False Siamensis' (Epalzeorhynchus sp. or Garra taeniata) also has this feature. Three genera in Mochokidae, Atopochilus, Chiloglanis, and Euchilichthys, also possess an oral sucker, formed by the lips and part of the barbels. The Loricariidae and members of the genus Gyrinocheilus are further adapted by having a special opening on the gill cover so that the fish can breathe without using its mouth.

Additionally, many other fish of the order Cypriniformes have developed a sucking ability to a lesser or greater extent:

- The Hillstream loaches (family Balitoridae) have modified fins to attach themselves to a surface and a ventrally located mouth.
- The sucker fish (family Catostomidae) also have a modified mouth.

Some tadpoles have a similar structure; the tadpoles of the purple frog (Nasikabatrachus sahyadrensis) bear an oral disc that is used to attach to their rocky substrate.

Whilst all these fish have a limited sucking ability – they are able to swallow their food – it is not necessarily correct to assume that they can attach themselves to a submerged object by suction; though their behaviour may give that impression, the orientation of their fins and a flow of water can give sufficient downward force to temporarily attach themselves to an object.

== See also ==
- Lamprey – Uses teeth to attach itself to a host. The sucker-like mouth is generally termed as an 'oral disk.'
- Remora – Sometimes known as 'suckerfish', remora use a modified dorsal fin to stick onto objects and other animals.
- Leech – The anterior portion (not the mouth) of this animal is modified to attach itself to a host.
