= Kasuku =

Commune in Kindu City, Democratic Republic of the Congo

- Commune
- Country: Democratic Republic of the Congo
- Province: Maniema
- City: Kindu

Kasuku is a commune of the city of Kindu in the Democratic Republic of the Congo. It is located along the western bank of the Congo River. It is the most populous of the three communes of Kindu City, ahead of Alunguli and Mikelenge. All three communes suffered heavy flooding in 2026.
