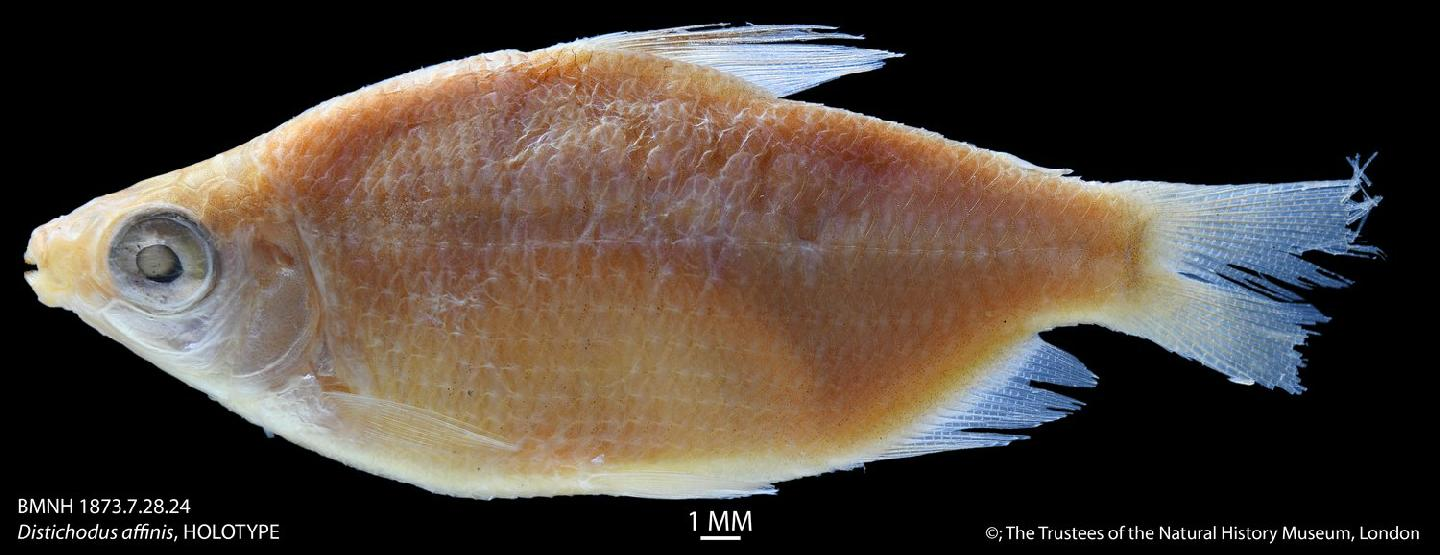

Conservation status
- Least Concern (IUCN 3.1)

Scientific classification
- Kingdom: Animalia
- Phylum: Chordata
- Class: Actinopterygii
- Order: Characiformes
- Family: Distichodontidae
- Genus: Distichodus
- Species: D. affinis

Binomial name
- Distichodus affinis Günther, 1873

Synonyms
- Distichodus abbreviatus Peters, 1877

= Silver distichodus =

Species of fish

The silver distichodus (Distichodus affinis) is a species of freshwater ray-finned fish belonging to the family Distichodontidae. It is found in the Congo River basin in Africa and is known from Cameroon, Central African Republic, Democratic Republic of Congo, and Republic of Congo. This species has a maximum total length of 20 cm (7.9 in).
