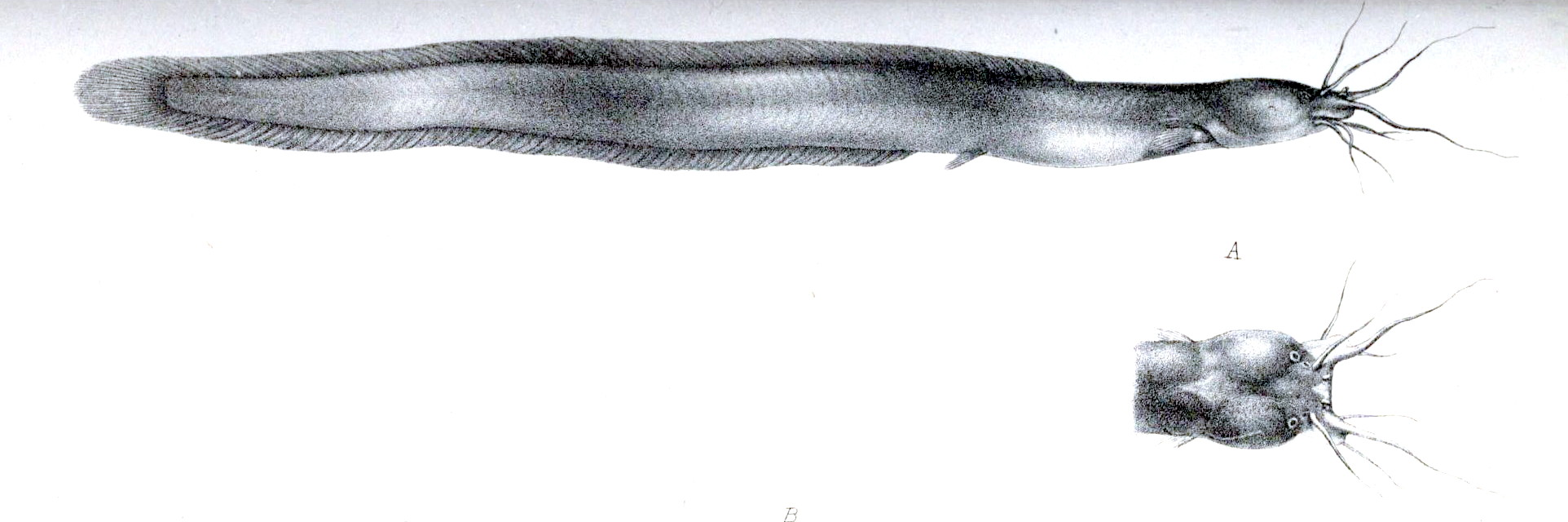
- Gymnallabes typus

Scientific classification
- Domain: Eukaryota
- Kingdom: Animalia
- Phylum: Chordata
- Class: Actinopterygii
- Order: Siluriformes
- Family: Clariidae
- Genus: Gymnallabes; Günther, 1867

Type species
- Gymnallabes typus Günther, 1867

= Gymnallabes =

Genus of fishes

Gymnallabes is a genus of airbreathing catfishes found in Africa. Gymnallabes species are thin and eel-like for burrowing.

== Species ==
There are currently two recognized species in this genus:

- Gymnallabes nops T. R. Roberts & D. J. Stewart, 1976
- Gymnallabes typus Günther, 1867
