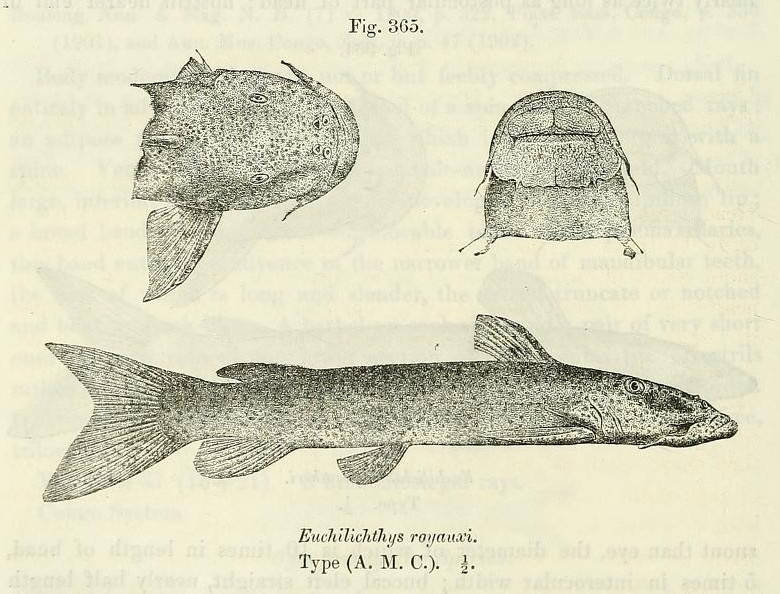

Conservation status
- Least Concern (IUCN 3.1)

Scientific classification
- Kingdom: Animalia
- Phylum: Chordata
- Class: Actinopterygii
- Order: Siluriformes
- Family: Mochokidae
- Genus: Euchilichthys
- Species: E. royauxi

Binomial name
- Euchilichthys royauxi Boulenger, 1902

= Euchilichthys royauxi =

Species of fish

Euchilichthys royauxi is a species of upside-down catfish native to the Congo Basin of Angola, Cameroon, the Democratic Republic of the Congo and Zambia. This species grows to a length of 22 centimetres (8.7 in) TL. Euchilichthys royauxi was named by George Albert Boulenger in 1902 from specimens taken in the Ubangi, its specific name royauxi is in honor of the Belgian officer Louis Joseph Royaux who led the expedition that collected the type specimen.
