= Euchilichthys dybowskii =

Conservation status
- Least Concern (IUCN 3.1)

Scientific classification
- Kingdom: Animalia
- Phylum: Chordata
- Class: Actinopterygii
- Order: Siluriformes
- Family: Mochokidae
- Genus: Euchilichthys
- Species: E. dybowskii

Binomial name
- Euchilichthys dybowskii (Vaillant, 1892)

Species of fish

Euchilichthys dybowskii is a species of upside-down catfish native to Cameroon, Central African Republic and the Democratic Republic of the Congo where it is found in the Dja and Ubangi Rivers and rivers of the eastern Congo Basin. This species grows to a length of 11.2 centimetres (4.4 in) TL.
