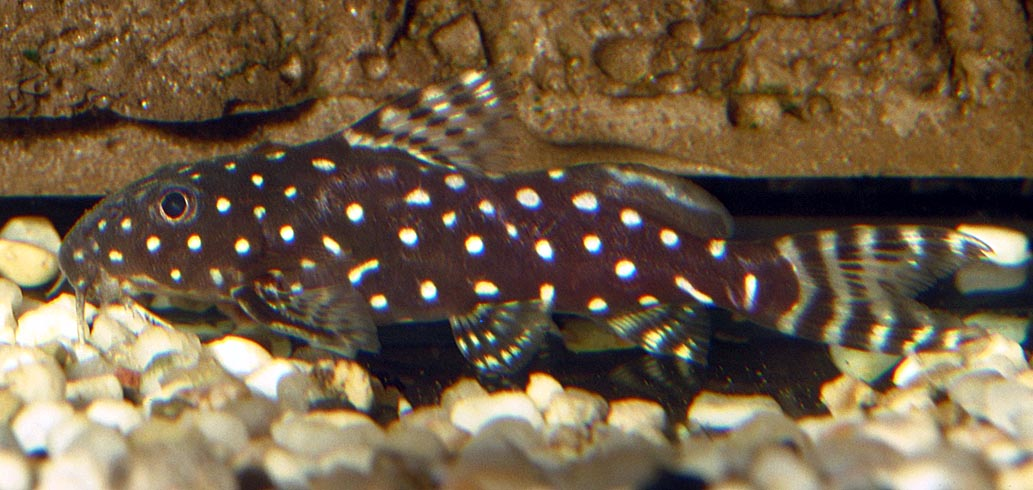

Conservation status
- Least Concern (IUCN 3.1)

Scientific classification
- Domain: Eukaryota
- Kingdom: Animalia
- Phylum: Chordata
- Class: Actinopterygii
- Order: Siluriformes
- Family: Mochokidae
- Genus: Synodontis
- Species: S. angelicus

Binomial name
- Synodontis angelicus Schilthuis, 1891

= Synodontis angelicus =

Species of fish

Synodontis angelicus is a species of upside-down catfish commonly named polkadot squeaker, black clown catfish, whitespotted squeaker, pearl squeaker, or angel squeaker. This species is native to the Congo Basin in the Democratic Republic of the Congo and the Republic of the Congo. It was originally described in 1891 by Belgian ichthyologist Louise Schilthuis after its discovery in the Malebo Pool of the Congo River. The specific name "angelicus" means heavenly or divine, since juveniles of this species are remarkable for their bright colors.

== Description ==
Adult specimens between 9 and 18 centimetres (3.5 and 7.1 in) are grey to dark violet, with reddish-yellow to bark brown-red blotches on the head, sides, adipose fin, and partly running together on the ventral surface. These blotches are evenly distributed and have sharp, distinct edges. The blotches may be edged with dark violet. The fins are dark violet with brownish blotches and streaks. Juveniles between 4 and 9 centimetres (1.6 and 3.5 in) are strikingly colored, with white, round blotches on a red-violet background.

The first ray of the dorsal fin and the pectoral fins have a hardened first ray which is serrated. The caudal fin is deeply forked with an extension on the top lobe. It has short, cone-shaped teeth in the upper jaw. In the lower jaw, the teeth are s-shaped and movable.

This species grows to a length of 25 centimetres (9.8 in) SL although specimens up to 55 centimetres (22 in) TL have been recorded in nature.

== In the aquarium ==
The species is commercially used as an aquarium species. The polka-dot African catfish is mostly nocturnal. These catfish will excavate the substrate and may nibble plants. They eat smaller live foods and prepared foods. They prefer a water temperature of 24 to 28 °C (75 to 82 °F), a pH of 6.0–8.0 and a hardness of 5–19 dGH.
