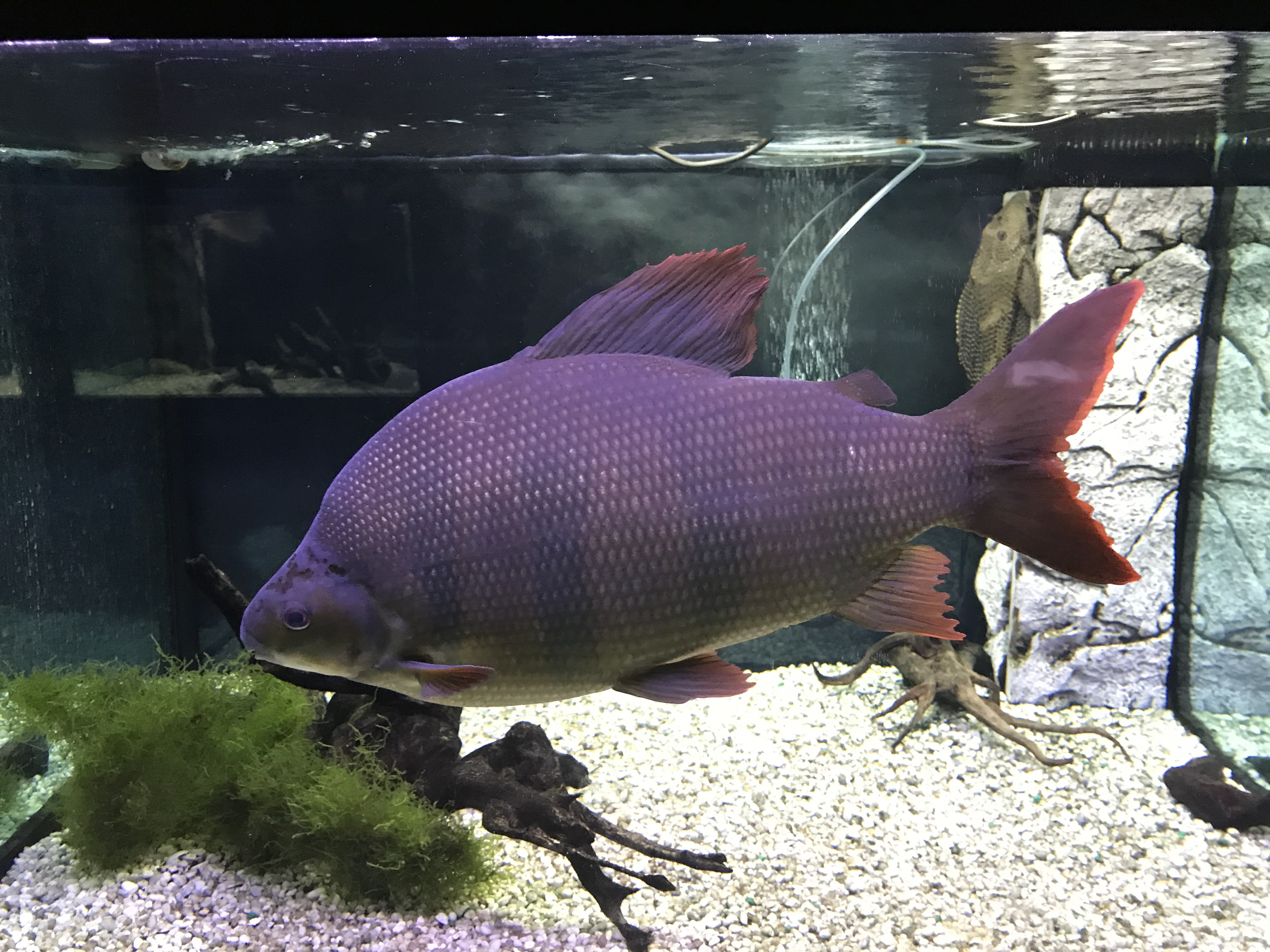

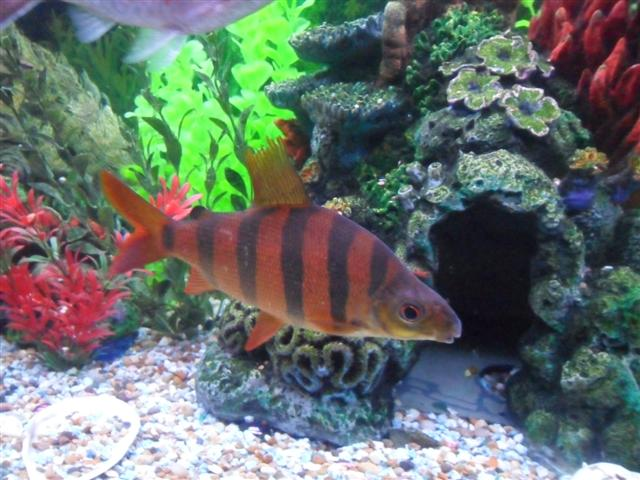
- Adult above, juvenile below

Conservation status
- Least Concern (IUCN 3.1)

Scientific classification
- Kingdom: Animalia
- Phylum: Chordata
- Class: Actinopterygii
- Order: Characiformes
- Family: Distichodontidae
- Genus: Distichodus
- Species: D. sexfasciatus

Binomial name
- Distichodus sexfasciatus Boulenger, 1897

Synonyms
- Distichodus tanganicae Worthington & Ricardo, 1937

= Six-banded distichodus =

Species of fish

The six-banded distichodus or sixbar distichodus (Distichodus sexfasciatus) is an African species of freshwater fish in the family Distichodontidae.

== Description ==
Distichodus sexfasciatus can reach a length of 76 centimetres (30 in). The body is high-backed, reddish brown to reddish-yellow colored, with an elongated, partially squat and a laterally flattened head. They are characterized by six dark vertical bands, which are slightly narrower than the spaces between them. The first band starts on the nape, the third can be found below the start of the dorsal fin, and the sixth on the caudal peduncle. Its snout has a characteristic conical shape, with two series of teeth and 14 teeth in each outer series. The dorsal fin starts slightly closer to the base of the caudal fin than the end of the snout, and it has 24–25 dorsal soft rays with small, round dark spots. The anal fin has 14–15 soft rays, and the lateral line contains 60-110 scales. Juveniles appear more reddish-yellow with very dark bands, and as the fish ages the bands fade and the body becomes more reddish brown (see images to the right).

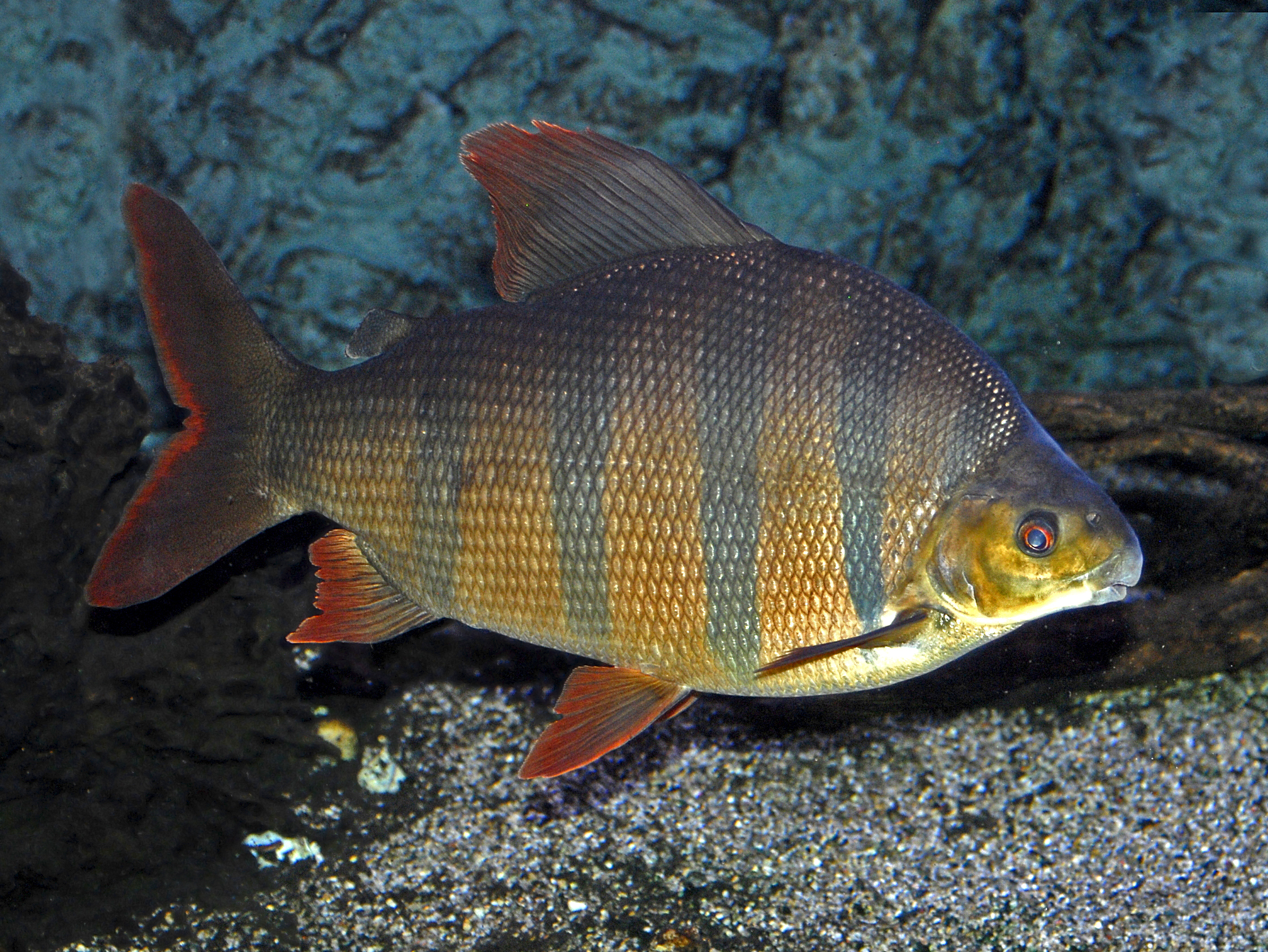
Sub-adult

== Distribution and habitat ==
This freshwater species can be found in Africa in the basin of the Congo River, with the exception of the Mweru-Luapula-Bangweulu system, and in Lake Tanganyika. These freshwater systems range the countries of Democratic Republic of the Congo, Central African Republic, Zambia, and Angola. The six-banded distichodus swims in swarms and schools in the deeper parts of rivers and lakes, in areas of tropical climate (typically 22–26 °C or 72–79 °F). Not much is known about the exact distributions of Distichodus sexfasciatus, but work has been done on the diversification of their genus Distichodus in Africa.The study done by the American Museum of Natural History found that diversity of the 25 species in this genus decreases as the distance from the Congo River Basin increases.

== Biology ==
These fishes feed on worms, crustaceans, insects, and plant matter, and many species in their family are broadly classified as herbivores. Like many of the species in Distichodontidae, the six-banded distichodus is known to have evolved an intramandibular joint (IMJ), an extra point of flexion in the lower jaw that is associated with benthic feeding. When eating invertebrates and plant matter that are attached to the bottom of a river or lake, the IMJ allows for increased complexity of motion. Not much is known on the specifics of the diet of the six-banded distichodus, but other species in Distichodontidae have been found to temporally change their diet in the wet and dry seasons, most likely due to seasonal changes in prey availability.

== Conservation status ==
Per the IUCN Red List of Threatened Species, Distichodus sexfasciatus is considered of least concern. Their main potential threat is the decline in wetland areas due to human influence, but it is noted that the current population trend is unknown and the last assessment was done in 2009. Further work is needed on their current population. The other potential threat to their native population is harvesting for the pet trade, as the six-banded distichodus is a popular aquarium fish due to its bright coloration. In aquariums, the six-banded distichodus has been cited to be aggressive and territorial, which poses a challenge for aquarists that seems to be enticing. This behavior is similar to other freshwater fish from Africa, such as cichlids.
