= Distichodus rufigiensis =

Conservation status
- Least Concern (IUCN 3.1)

Scientific classification
- Kingdom: Animalia
- Phylum: Chordata
- Class: Actinopterygii
- Division: Teleostei
- Order: Characiformes
- Family: Distichodontidae
- Genus: Distichodus
- Species: D. rufigiensis

Binomial name
- Distichodus rufigiensis Norman, 1922

Species of fish

Distichodus rufigiensis is a species of freshwater fish in the family Distichodontidae. It is endemic to Tanzania and occurs in the Wami, Rufiji, and Ruvuma River systems.

This species is native to a tropical climate. It inhabits rivers and may also colonized reservoirs. It grows to 17 cm (6.7 in) total length. D. rufigiensis is decreasing in population due to the threats of illegal fishing, siltation choking its spawning substrate, and land-based pollution.
