= Distichodus petersii =

Conservation status
- Vulnerable (IUCN 3.1)

Scientific classification
- Kingdom: Animalia
- Phylum: Chordata
- Class: Actinopterygii
- Order: Characiformes
- Family: Distichodontidae
- Genus: Distichodus
- Species: D. petersii

Binomial name
- Distichodus petersii Pfeffer, 1896

Species of fish

Distichodus petersii is a species of fish in the family Distichodontidae. It is endemic to Tanzania. Its natural habitat is rivers.

The fish patronym was not identified in the original description but was probably in honor of Wilhelm C. H. Peters (1815-1883), a German naturalist and explorer whose travels to Africa brought to Berlin a huge collection of natural history specimens, including many fishes which Peters described.

== Morphology ==
Males can reach a total length of 45 cm.
