= Louis Royaux =

Belgian soldier and explorer

Louis Joseph Royaux
- Born: Louis Joseph Royaux; 28 November 1866; Dinant, Belgium
- Died: 7 August 1936 (aged 69); Mont-Saint-Jean, Belgium
- Occupations: soldier, colonial administrator, naturalist

Louis Joseph Royaux (1866-1936) was a Belgian soldier, colonial administrator and explorer. Royaux was born on 28 November 1866 in Boisselles, near Dinant, Belgium. His parents were Alexander Royaux and Florentine Royaux (née Beaulot). On 3 April 1888 he enlisted in the 10e régiment de ligne of the Belgian Army, and was appointed as an instructor in the regiment's school in late 1890. He entered the service of the Congo Free State on 1 September 1892 as a sergeant of Force Publique, sailing from Antwerp aboard the "Lulu Bohlen" on 6 September 1892.

== Congo Free State ==
On arrival he was appointed to the Ubangi-Bomu expedition, leaving Boma on the 10 October 1892 and arriving in Zongo on 2 December where he was deputy to the Chef de Poste Heymans. Here he soon distinguished himself with his skills as an administrator and organiser. He subdued the populations of Ubangi district to the authority of the Congo Free State, being seriously wounded twice in skirmishes with the native people. Through his patience and common sense he learnt the local languages, persuading them to pay the taxes demanded by the Free State and conscripts for the Force Publique.

His first term ended in August 1895 and he returned to Europe, he began his second term on 6 April 1896 when he left Antwerp to return to the Congo as a lieutenant, and then captain of the Force Publique, lasting until 9 April 1902. He was appointed area manager for Banzyville on 23 February 1897, a role he combined with those of a commander of Force Publique, a military judge in Upper Ubangi and even that of a naturalist collector. He returned to Belgium in May 1902 and was charged by King Leopold II to join an expedition to Bahr el Ghazal towards the copper mines of Hofrah-el-Nahass, which prior to the Franco-Congolese Treaty of August 14, 1894 had been explored and occupied for the Free State by Kethulle de Ryhove and Nilis as part of the Lado Enclave. He left Belgium on 2 October 1902 and arrived in Doruma on 17 January 1903. He was accompanied by his deputy, Captain Landeghem, a geological engineer, several prospectors and a military escort of two companies of Force Publique, they crossed the northern border of Congo on 2 February 1903. The expedition's vanguard, led by Landeghem, marched northwards and reached Dem Ziber - also often spelled "Deim Zubeir" - but the expedition did not go beyond that as an Anglo-Egyptian intervention ended the mission.

He returned to Belgium in late December 1903, and began a career in brewing but he returned to the Congo in February 1907 to Mayumbe, as Director of the Company Urselia. He returned again for a sixth term in Kwango as a representative of the companies trading and exploiting raw rubber.

== First World War ==
He was preparing for a 7th term in the Congo when the First World War broke out and Royaux, despite being too old to be called up, volunteered for service as a Captain in the Reserve. So at 48, he was appointed as commander of the 1ere compagnie of the 10e régiment de ligne. Present at the Siege of Namur (1914), Royaux distinguished himself in combat and was mentioned in dispatches. After the fall of Namur, he was part of the retreat to Antwerp and took part in the action which halted the German advance at the Battle of the Yser where he was praised by Lieutenant-General Édouard Michel du Faing d'Aigremont, his divisional commander. He was promoted to captain and appointed commander Knight of the Order of Leopold. He was seriously wounded in the left arm at Diksmuide and after recuperating was promoted to Major and was appointed to command the School of Military Interpreters and the Bayeux inspection camp in Normandy. Royaux took part in the offensive to liberate Belgium as commander of the 1ere battalion of 10e regiment de ligne from 1 September 1918. On 14 October 1918, his unit surprised and captured an entire German battalion and as a result he was awarded the Distinguished Service Order.

== Post-war ==
After the armistice which ended the war, he was part of the Army of Occupation on the Rhine. He retired on 31 December 1922 but retained interests in the industrial and commercial companies and then was chairman of the Compagnie des Cafés Congo Belgique. In 1933, a ceremony was held in his honor on the occasion of the laying of a commemorative plaque at his birthplace in Boisselles. He died in Mont-Saint-Jean, near Waterloo on 7 August 1936 at the age of 69. His honours included Knight of the Royal Order of the Lion, Knight of the Order of Leopold, Gold Service Star with 3 bars.

== Natural History legacy ==
The Royal Sprat Microthrissa royauxi and the upside down catfish Euchilichthys royauxi were named by George Albert Boulenger in 1902 from specimens taken in the Ubangi, their specific name royauxi is in honor of Royaux who led the expedition that collected the type specimens.
