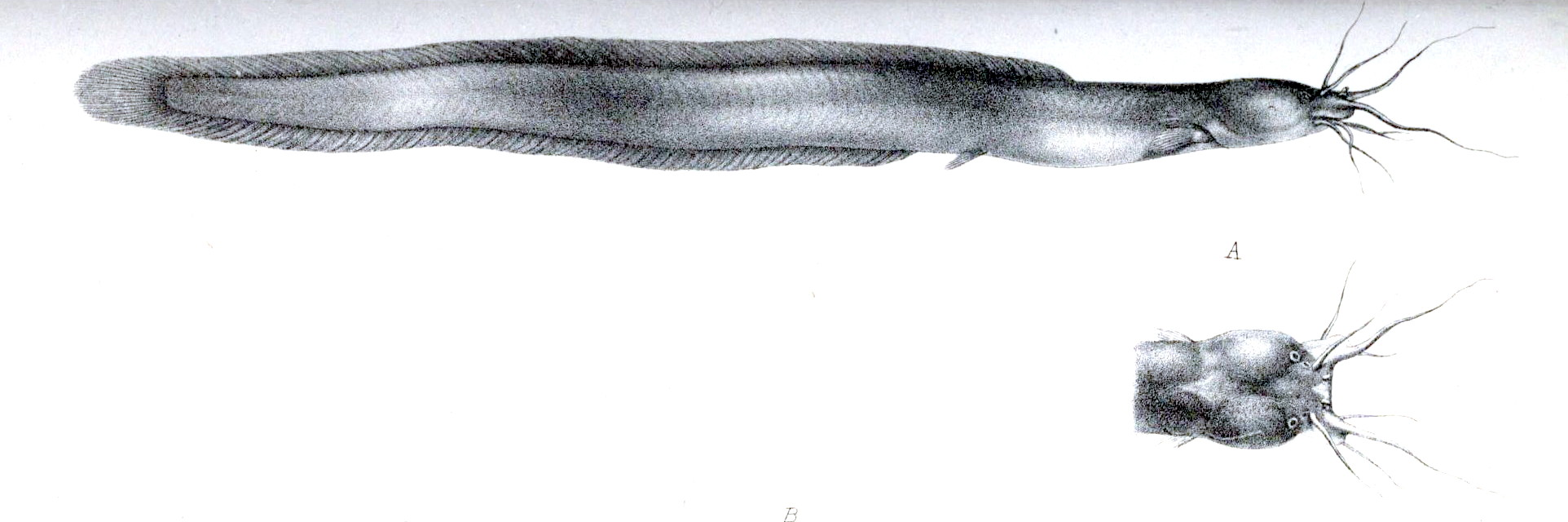

Conservation status
- Least Concern (IUCN 3.1)

Scientific classification
- Kingdom: Animalia
- Phylum: Chordata
- Class: Actinopterygii
- Order: Siluriformes
- Family: Clariidae
- Genus: Gymnallabes
- Species: G. typus

Binomial name
- Gymnallabes typus Günther, 1867

= Gymnallabes typus =

Species of fish

Gymnallabes typus is a species of airbreathing catfish found in Benin, Cameroon and Nigeria. It occurs in the delta and the lower reaches of the Niger River as well as the Cross River. It reaches a length of 23 cm (9.1 in) TL.
