= Alunguli =

Commune in Kindu City, Democratic Republic of the Congo

- Commune
- Country: Democratic Republic of the Congo
- Province: Maniema
- City: Kindu

Alunguli or Alungili is a commune of the city of Kindu in the Democratic Republic of the Congo. It is located along the eastern bank of the Congo River. It is the least populous of the three communes of Kindu City, behind Kasuku and Mikelenge. All three communes suffered heavy flooding in 2026.
