= Études Sans Frontières International =

French non-profit organisation

Etudes Sans Frontières International
- Founded: 2011
- Type: Non-profit; NGO
- Services: Improving access for young adults from crisis regions to higher education
- Fields: education
- Website: ww.esf-international.org

Etudes Sans Frontières International (commonly known as ESFI and Studies Without Borders International) is the international federation of existing chapters and members that adhere to the values, objectives, methods, statute and internal rules of the Etudes Sans Frontières movement (ESF), in order to be able to carry the name Etudes Sans Frontières. The federation is registered in Paris as a non-profit organization (Loi 1901), which relies on international volunteers to help develop its programs.

The aim of ESFI is to improve access for young adults from crisis regions to higher education and targeted practical qualifications – which otherwise would not be accessible to them because of the situation in their country – so as to enhance their willingness and capability to commit themselves to the (re-)construction of a peaceful, free and fair society in their home country.

== Crisis regions ==
This term refers to any national or sub-national area worldwide whose population faces violent conflict, post-conflict challenges, severe political oppression, a failed state situation, extreme poverty or environmental disasters, leading to severely restricted access to higher education or a severely reduced capacity of the higher education system.

== Current programs ==
Currently ESFI has higher education programs implying students from Rwanda, Democratic Republic of Congo, Haiti, Chechnya and Afghanistan. Whenever possible, ESFI helps these students study in their home countries by offering full scholarship programs that cover living and study expenses.

ESFI also helps advance education facilities in crisis regions, develops e-learning, internship programs wherever possible and networking and offers capacity-building workshops to its members. All ESFI activities are meant to enhance sustainable development and peace by supporting motivated individuals to engage in meaningful positive change in their region.

== Peculiarity of ESFI scholarships abroad ==
Students who are offered grants to study outside of their home country (in Europe and North America for example) are carefully selected with reference to their academic performance, motivation, language skills, capacity to adapt to Western systems of higher education and most of all on their "return project" (i.e. in what way concretely they hope to make use of the new skills and capabilities they have mastered with their studies abroad). They are requested to honour a formal agreement – they have signed and sent before leaving for their studies abroad – to return to their home country once they have completed their studies and requirements of their bursary. This has been subject to some criticism, however, by various groups.

== Public awareness ==
ESFI also aims to raise worldwide public awareness and solidarity on situations prevailing in crisis regions from which their scholarship students come, by the organization of public information activities, conferences, debates, film presentations, etc. and fundraising events.

Volunteers are mostly university students, employees and retirees from academic executive jobs. Donators come from many backgrounds. Since its beginning, volunteers and donators support the movement and the organization to create an international network.

== Shared values ==
All ESFI members and persons who benefit from activities carried out in the name of Etudes Sans Frontières are requested to respect and promote these values: international, intercultural and intergenerational solidarity;

- peace and non-violence;
- fundamental human rights as specified in the Universal Declaration of Human Rights, the International Covenant on Civil and Political Rights, and the International Covenant on Economic, Social and Cultural Rights;
- transparency, impartiality and fairness.

ESFI is based on the belief that these values are universal and that their origin cannot be claimed by any particular culture or society. At the same time, it acknowledges and respects the rich cultural diversity of human societies.

== History ==
The first chapter of Etudes Sans Frontières that started the international movement was founded as a non profit organization in 2003 in Paris by students and members of the French civil society. It emerged as the second Chechen war was raging in the Caucasus and students from the Grozny University lost numerous professors to the war and bombs destroyed part of their university building and library.

A handful of French students with the help of many volunteers troubled by the terrible situation these students had to endure to acquire an education started the movement by welcoming to Paris a first cohort of 9 students in 2003 – 21 Chechen students were offered bursaries over a period of six years afterwards – who completed studies in such diverse disciplines as journalism, sociology, psychology, political science, architecture, administration, fashion, languages, etc.

The French chapter also helped Rwandan orphans to resume their studies in Rwanda after the genocide of 1994 and the following years of chaos. The impetus gained in the community by the implication of these young students prompted the local authorities to install electricity in the village, which radically changed the life of the people.

The movement started by Etudes Sans Frontières in France rapidly picked up momentum when renowned international public figures such as Bronislaw Geremek, André Glucksman, Elena Bonner, Youri Afanassief, Pascal Bruckner, Jack Lang, Pierre Hassner, Pierre Lellouche, Josep Ramoneda, Jacques Rupnik, Walter Veltroni and many others helped secure funds to offer grants to Chechen students. The president of this prestigious Honours Committee was the no less respected dissident playwright and first president of the Czech Republic, Václav Havel, now deceased (2011).

The international success obtained by the French founding chapter rapidly branched out in Europe and North America with chapters opening up in Belgium (2005), Quebec, Canada (July 2006), Germany (October 2006), Italy (December 2006), Spain (April 2007), Norway (2007).

Since most European chapters were initiated by very active and motivated students, some have been short-lived when these have left the university after graduation to settle in life. Some of these chapters have become "dormant chapters" which can be revived anytime by new teams, with new ideas and projects.

On the other hand, well-grounded active chapter can decide to extend their range of activities by opening new branches in other cities and universities of their region or country.

== Active Chapters ==
=== Germany ===
The German chapter (SOG) – Studieren Ohne Grenzen – is the most extensive of the ESF movement with more than 1,000 members active in a dozen German cities and universities. Since its opening in 2006, it has developed very important scholarship program for students in the Democratic Republic of Congo registered in different programs at UNIKIND (University of Kindu located in Maniema State in the Eastern part of the country) where they also have plans to develop a computer room and build a library with the help of local organizations.

SOG is also involved with the Institut Supérieur d’Études agronomiques in Mweso where it sponsors 64 students who study with scholarships to become qualified agronomists with the intent of helping to alleviate poverty and hunger.

SOG has also offered Chechen students full scholarships to acquire a university diploma in Germany, including preparatory language courses. These students benefit from intensive mentoring and support throughout their stay in Germany. During their studies in Germany they prepare a project which aims to support the development of their home country’s society and culture that will be implemented after their graduation.

=== Canada ===
The Canadian chapter (ESF-Qc) – Études sans frontières, section Québec – the only chapter founded outside Europe by university employees in 2006 [with the help of Université du Québec à Montréal - UQAM] has focused on two crisis region, Rwanda and Haiti, after having tried for two years without success to sponsor two Chechen students from the capital Grozny.

It has helped so far a Rwandan student and mother complete a master's degree in clinical psychology (2009-2013). It is currently sponsoring a Haitian student who studies to acquire a master's degree in Computer science applied to Management, who has plans to help modernize the public Archives in Haiti upon his return to his home country. ESF-Qc has already made contact with Bibliothèque et Archives nationales du Québec (BAnQ) in order to select an internship and mentoring program concurrent to this student’ studies in Montréal.

ESF-Qc has also sponsored two Congolese students for two years in collaboration with the German project operating in UNIKIND (University of Kindu) in the Democratic Republic of Congo.

The Canadian chapter has projects in 2013-2014 to extend its activities to two other francophone universities in the province of Québec and to sponsor more students from crisis regions. It is running a major fundraising operation in the Montreal university community and civil society.

=== France ===
The French chapter, established in 2003, has continued its projects in recent years with a small membership and ongoing support from donors.

A Chechen student who arrived in France in 2007 completed an undergraduate program in Political Science at L'Institut d'Études Politiques de Paris. She subsequently registered for a master's degree in European Affairs with a scheduled completion in 2013. She is the final student of a program in which 20 students from Chechnya completed university degrees in France.

The French chapter is also pursuing the Kimironko project started in 2006 with the help of ESF-Italy, which has offered 12 scholarships to orphans of all ages living together on a hill near Kigali in order to take care of each other without the help of their parents killed in the 1994 genocide. Six graduated in 2012 and three others study in programs of Finance, Administration and International Relations in Rwanda. The Rwandan project is due to end in 2014 with lasting success for the many students who completed their high school, college or university studies.10

In 2013, ESF France is planning to finance a 3 to 6 months training program in French for its former pivot person in Chechnya. In addition it keeps contact with former beneficiaries and helps them with non-financial or financial matters related to their professional projects based on their specific needs. With no more than 3 members left from the initial team, the French chapter will mutate to "dormant" status in 2014 unless it is revived by a new team.
