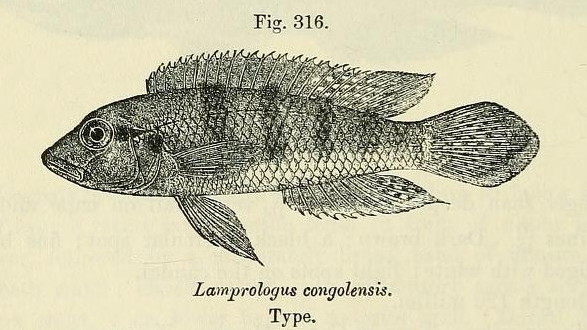

Conservation status
- Least Concern (IUCN 3.1)

Scientific classification
- Kingdom: Animalia
- Phylum: Chordata
- Class: Actinopterygii
- Order: Cichliformes
- Family: Cichlidae
- Subfamily: Pseudocrenilabrinae
- Tribe: Lamprologini
- Genus: Lamprologus
- Species: L. congoensis

Binomial name
- Lamprologus congoensis Schilthuis, 1891

Synonyms
- Acanthochromis seminudus Vaillant, 1886 nomen nudum; Lamprologus fuscus Pellegrin, 1927

= Lamprologus congoensis =

Species of fish

Lamprologus congoensis, the Congo lionhead cichlid is a species of riverine cichlid which is widespread in the Congo River, it is the type species of the genus Lamprologus.

== Description ==
Lamprolgus congoensis is one of the more deep-bodied riverine species of Lamprolgus with the mean body depth being 25.2% of the standard length and the head is roughly one third of the standard length. Smaller fish have the forehead at a steeper angle than more mature fish. It is a sexually dimorphic species in which the males attain a larger size than the females and develop a fat-filled nuchal hump on the head, and have relatively longer fins than the females. The base body colouration is greyish lavender, shading to yellow on the belly, just to the rear of the base of the pectoral fin, along the junction of preoperculum and operculum, and around lower margin of orbit. There is a scaleless, dark spot on the operculum and there are normally five or six darkish vertical bars along flanks . Each flank scales has dark pigment distributed uniformly around exposed rare edde and these intersect to create a pattern reminiscent of chain mail. Small, whitish spots form lines along the membranes between the rays of the dorsal, anal and caudal fins. These three fins also show oblique black striations. There are iridescent spots in towards the posterior point of most of the flank scales, next to the overlapping edge of the scale in front of it. Males grow to around 15 cm in total length, females to 10 cm.

== Distribution ==
Lamprolgus congoensis occurs in the Congo River basin, from the Pool Malebo to Monsembe in the Republic of Congo and the Democratic Republic of the Congo, in the lower Kasai and in the upper Sangha in the Central African Republic.

== Habitat and ecology ==
Lamprolgus congoensis is a benthopelagic species which is found in areas of rapids It appears to feed on invertebrates and a gut examined contains the remains of insects and spider, They males are territorial and usually have a number of females within the territory he guards, the female lays 80 or so eggs in a sheltered spot such as a cave, laying the eggs onto the ceiling of the cave. The eggs hatch after around 54 hours and the eggs and young fish are guarded by the female until the fry become free swimming at eight days old.

== Human use ==
Lamprolgus congoensis is a quarry species for fisheries and is a species used for human consumption. It is common and easy to breed in the aquarium.
