= University of Kindu =

University in the DRC

- Université de Kindu (French)
- Former names: Kindu Center University
- Type: Public
- Established: October 1, 2004 (21 years ago)
- Location: Kindu, Democratic Republic of the Congo; 2.9387°S 25.9255°E
- Campus: Urban
- Nickname: UNIKI
- Website: University website

The University of Kindu (UNIKI) is a public university in the Democratic Republic of the Congo, located in the province of Maniema, city of Kindu. At its creation, it was an Extension of the University of Lubumbashi, then called University Centre of Kindu (C.U.K.). As of 2012, instruction is in French.

== History ==
The university was created 1 October 2004 as Kindu Center University(C.U.K.), extension of the University of Lubumbashi, and became autonomous in 2010 following Ministerial order No. 157/MINESU/CABMIN/EBK/PK/2010 27 September 2010.

== See also ==
- Kindu
- List of universities in the Democratic Republic of the Congo
