= Kindu =

Kindu Jiji la Kindu (Swahili)
- Provincial capital and city
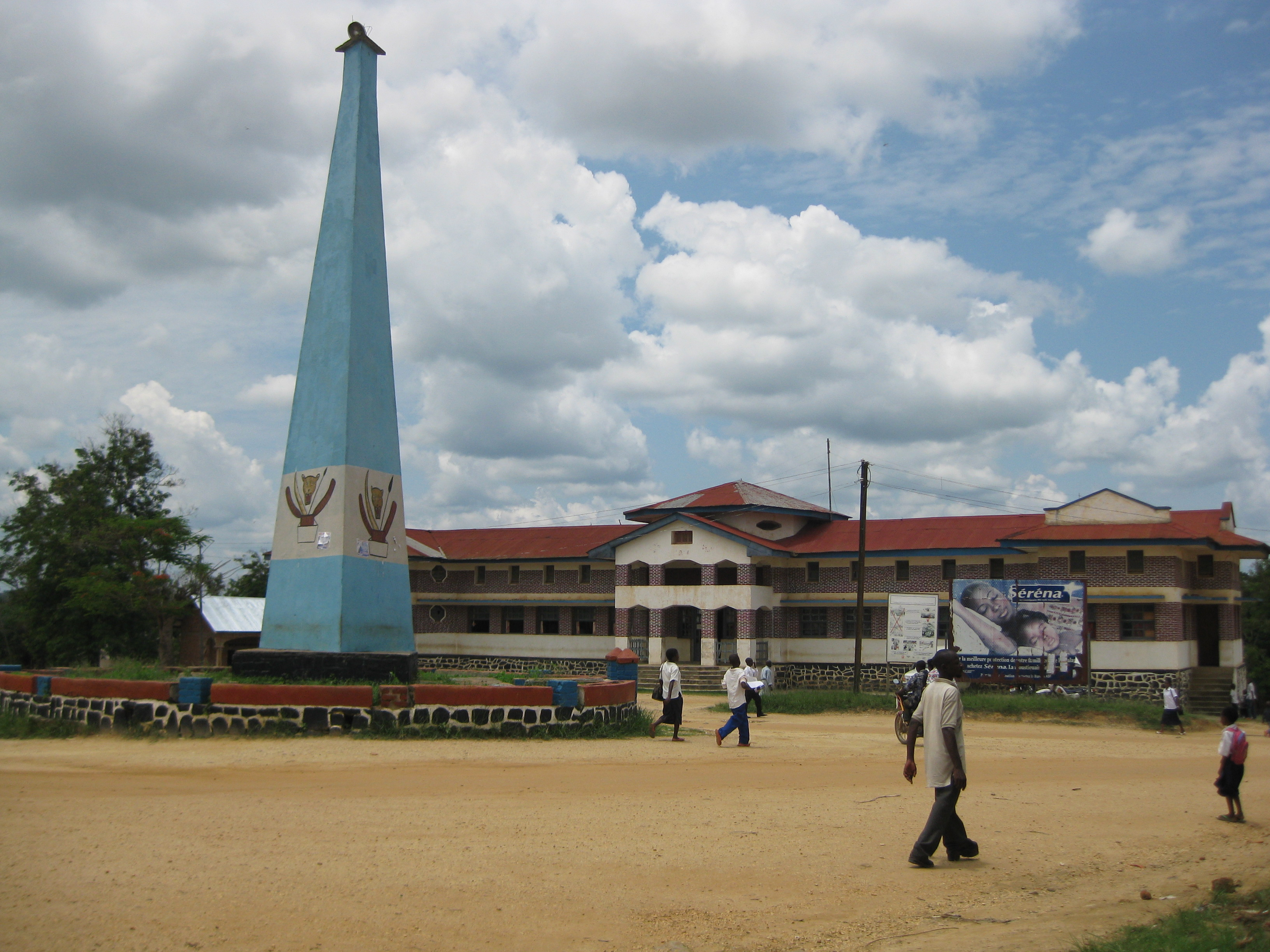
- Monument in Kindu

- Location in Democratic Republic of the Congo
- Coordinates: 2°57′S 25°57′E
- Country: DR Congo
- Province: Maniema
- City status: 1988
- Communes: Alunguli, Kasuku, Mikelenge

Government
  - Mayor: Augustin Mulamba

Area
  - Total: 150 km^{2} (58 sq mi)
- Elevation: 504 m (1,654 ft)

Population (2012)
  - Total: 172,321
  - Density: 1,100/km^{2} (3,000/sq mi)
- Time zone: UTC+2 (CAT)
- Climate: Aw
- National language: Swahili

Kindu is a city in the Democratic Republic of Congo, the capital of Maniema province. It has a population of about 200,000 and is situated on the Lualaba River at an altitude of about 500 metres, and is about 400 km west of Bukavu.

Kindu is linked by rail to the mining areas of Kalemie, Kamina and Kananga to the south. It also has an airport with a 2,200 metre runway and has historically been an important port along the Congo River system.

== History ==
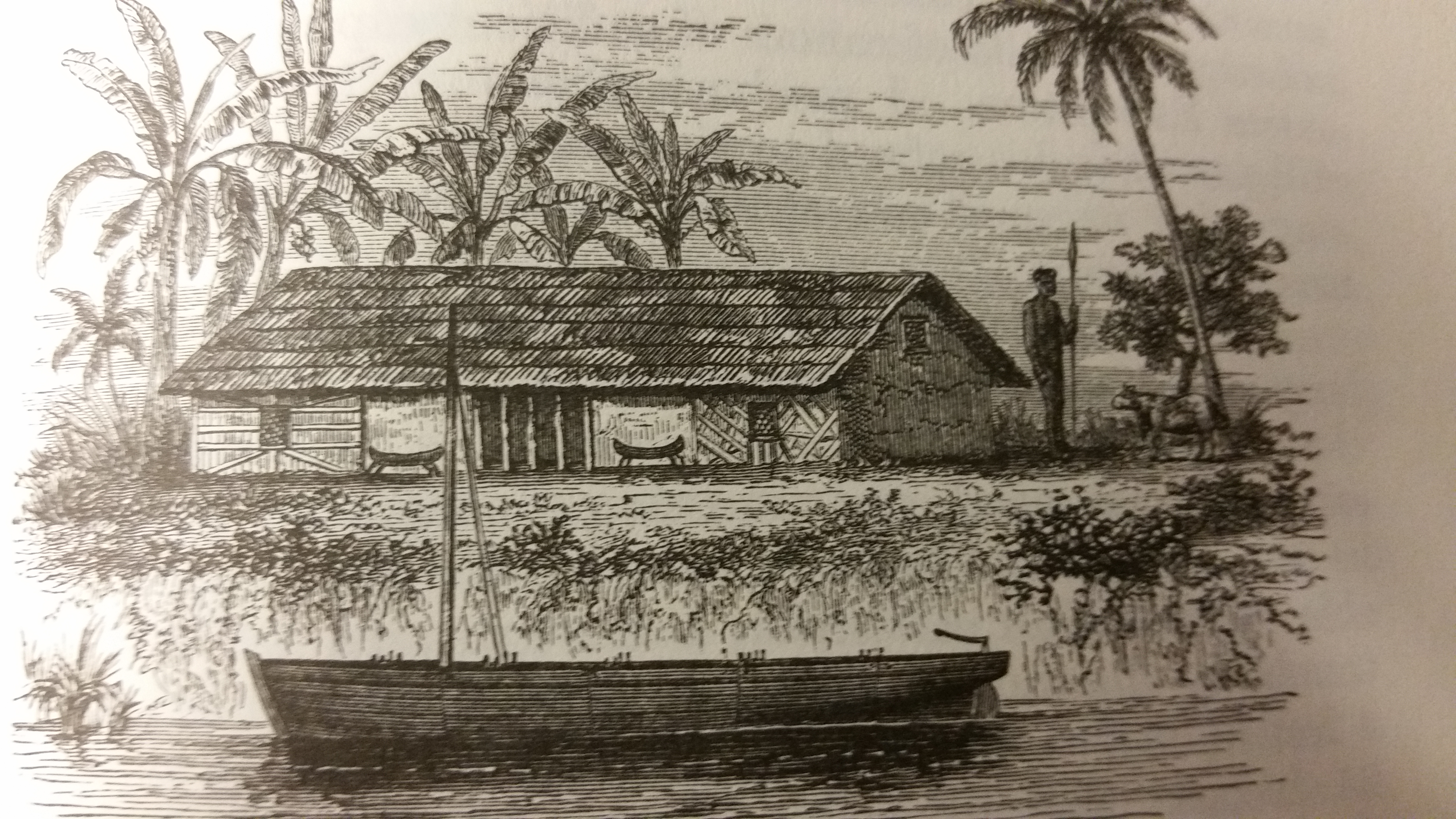
Ikondu village as seen by Stanley

The town was an important centre for ivory, gold and the slave trade during the nineteenth century. Arab-Swahili slave traders were based here from about 1860 and sent caravans overland to Zanzibar.

Henry Morton Stanley came upon "this remarkable town" on 5 Dec. 1876, describing it as "remarkably long" with a "broad street, thirty feet wide, and two miles in length" and "behind the village were the banana and the palm groves."

In November 1961, during the Congo Crisis, the Kindu atrocity took place in Kindu. During the rule of Mobutu Sese Seko Kindu was also the capital of the former Maniema subregion of Kivu region.

== Geography ==
Kindu is located 2°57′S, 25°55′E at an elevation of approximately 1500 ft (450 m) above sea level.

== Demographics ==
The city's population is estimated at between 140,000 and 200,000 residents. As with the rest of Congo, the vast majority adhere to Christianity. Just under half of the population is Catholic. Slightly under 10% of the population are Anglican, and there is also a small Muslim community in the city.

== Economy ==
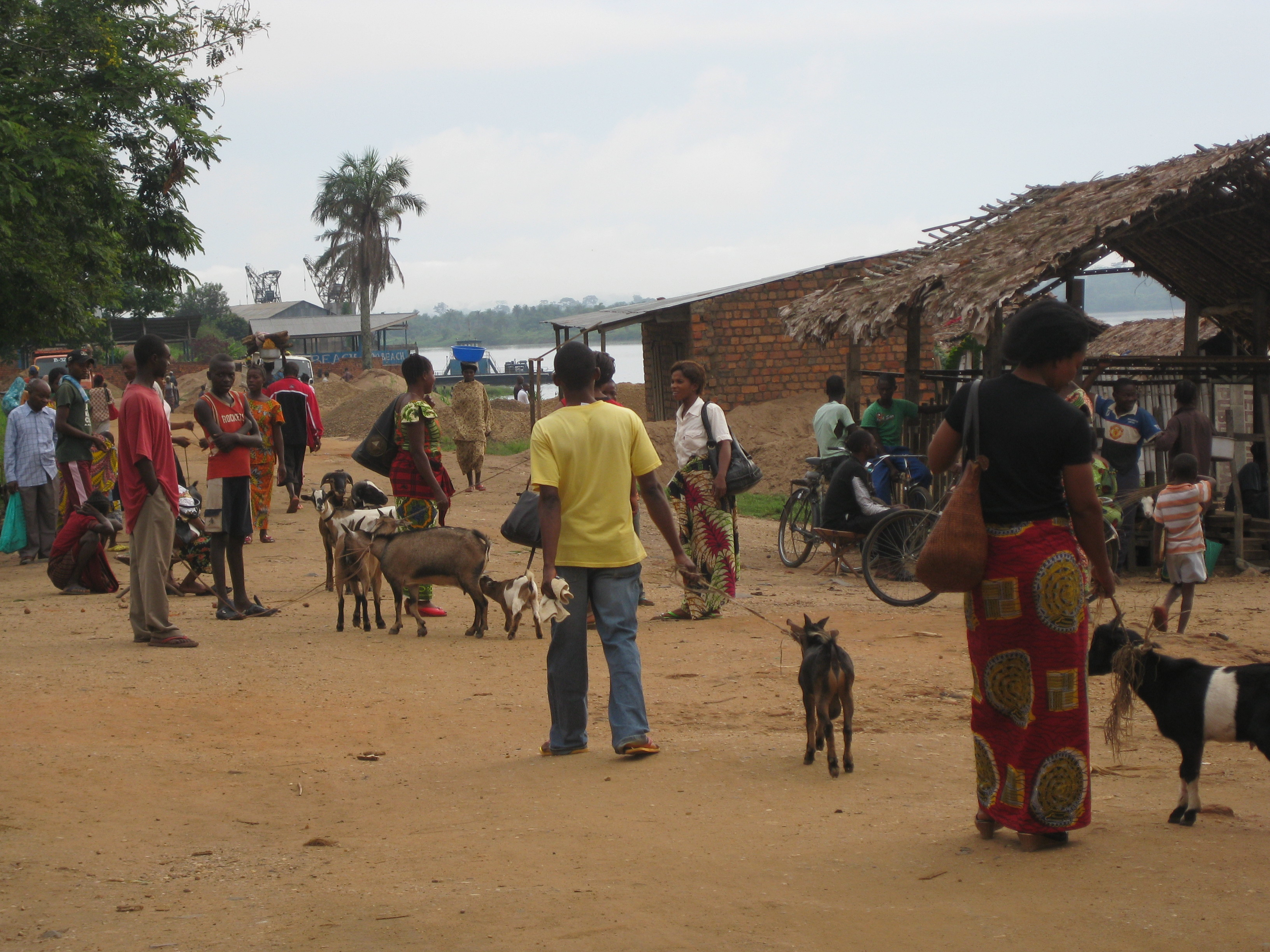
Local people offering goats for sale.

The main economic activity in Maniema Province is mining. Diamonds, copper, gold and cobalt are mined near Kindu. There is a market in Kindu as well as shops throughout the town.

== Government and politics ==
Kindu is the provincial capital and is home to the provincial assembly and ministries.

== Transportation ==
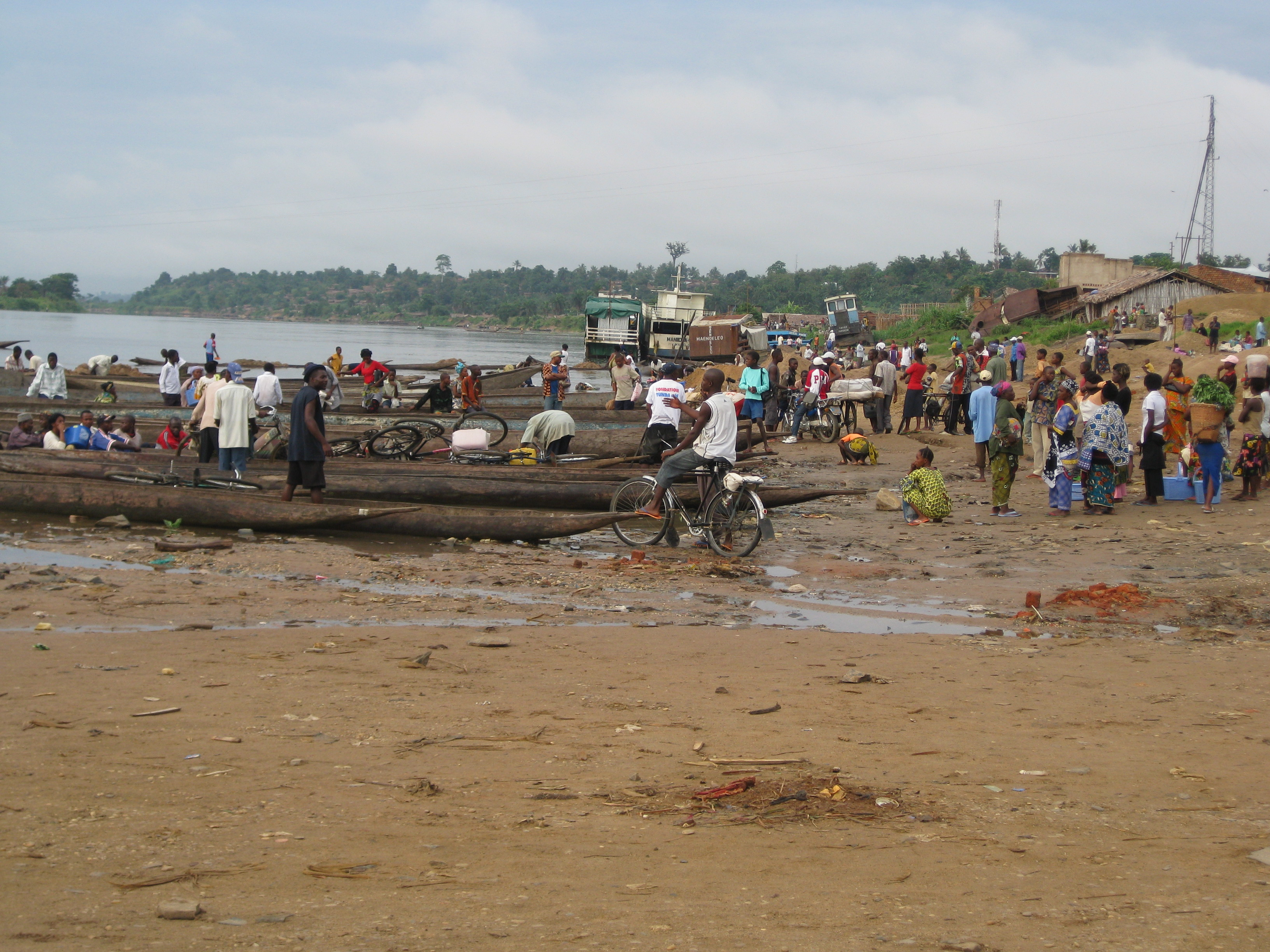
Kindu Port

Kindu is served by Kindu Airport. Most of the goods coming to town come from Goma, Bukavu and Kinshasa by air.

It is also the northern terminus of the Congo Railway line which connects it to Lubumbashi among other destinations. Goods from Kisangani or further must change from ship to train and vice versa a couple of times to reach Lubumbashi.

There is also a port in Kindu which is located on the western bank of the Lualaba River.

Kindu lies along National Road 31 (N31) as well as Primary Regional Road 508 (R508).

Roads in Maniema Province are unsurfaced and in a generally poor condition.

== Education ==
The town has primary and secondary education facilities. The University of Kindu is also located in the city.

== Notable residents ==
- Steve Wembi

== Climate ==
Kindu has a tropical savanna climate (Köppen Aw) bordering upon a tropical monsoon climate (Am) with a short dry season in June and July.

Climate data for Kindu
Month	Jan	Feb	Mar	Apr	May	Jun	Jul	Aug	Sep	Oct	Nov	Dec	Year
Mean daily maximum °C (°F)	29.5 (85.1)	30.2 (86.4)	29.9 (85.8)	29.3 (84.7)	29.7 (85.5)	30.4 (86.7)	31.4 (88.5)	30.9 (87.6)	29.9 (85.8)	29.4 (84.9)	28.7 (83.7)	28.6 (83.5)	31.4 (88.5)
Mean daily minimum °C (°F)	22.1 (71.8)	22.4 (72.3)	22.4 (72.3)	22.5 (72.5)	22.6 (72.7)	21.9 (71.4)	21.7 (71.1)	22.1 (71.8)	22.1 (71.8)	22.1 (71.8)	21.9 (71.4)	21.9 (71.4)	21.7 (71.1)
Average rainfall mm (inches)	32.2 (1.27)	42.5 (1.67)	43.1 (1.70)	50.0 (1.97)	32.7 (1.29)	6.3 (0.25)	7.5 (0.30)	22.4 (0.88)	34.5 (1.36)	60.2 (2.37)	64.6 (2.54)	51.0 (2.01)	447 (17.61)
Source: Weatherbox

== See also ==
- Kindu atrocity
- University of Kindu
