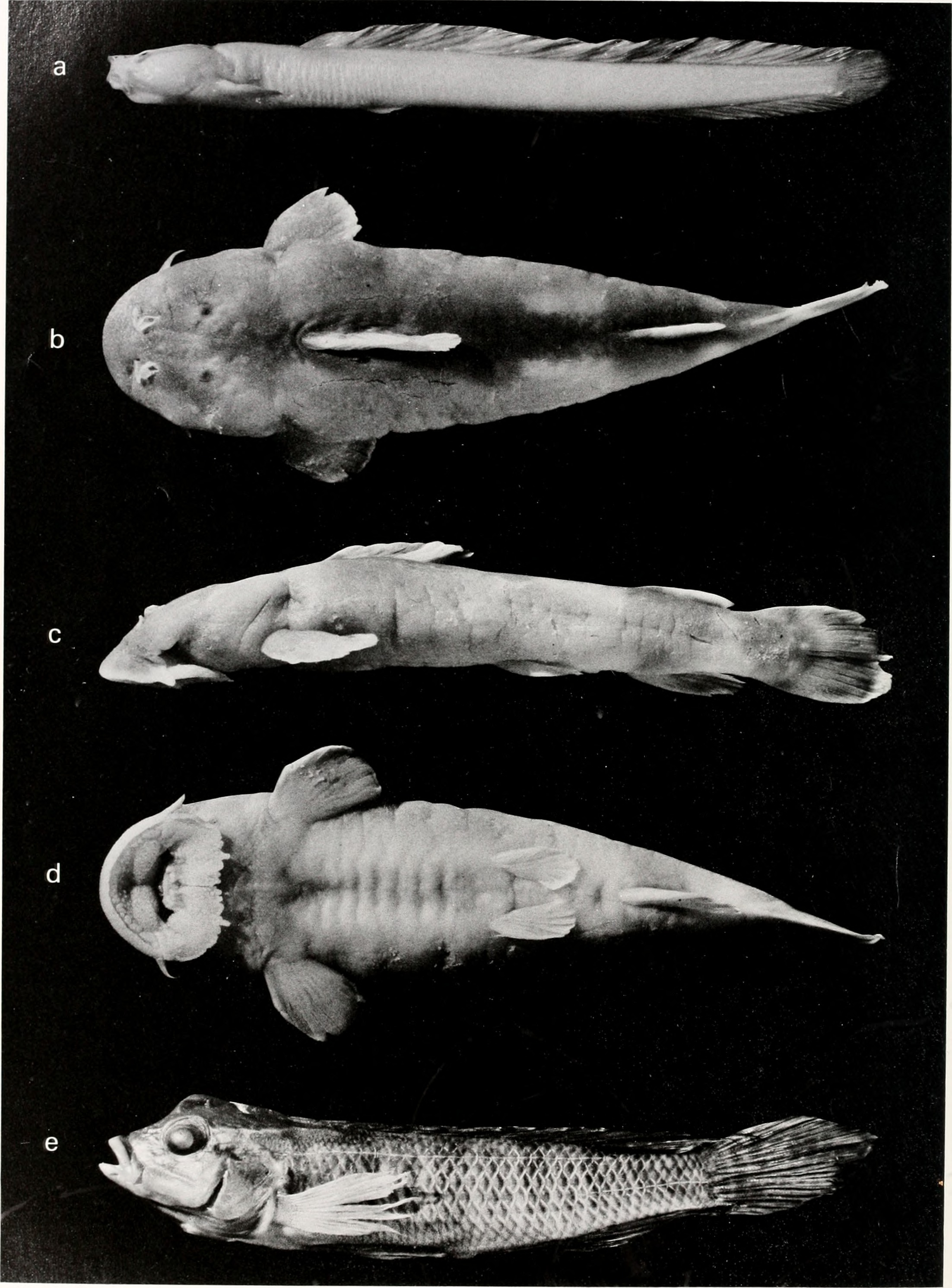
- Gymnallabes nops top

Conservation status
- Vulnerable (IUCN 3.1)

Scientific classification
- Kingdom: Animalia
- Phylum: Chordata
- Class: Actinopterygii
- Order: Siluriformes
- Family: Clariidae
- Genus: Gymnallabes
- Species: G. nops

Binomial name
- Gymnallabes nops T. R. Roberts & D. J. Stewart, 1976

= Gymnallabes nops =

Species of fish

Gymnallabes nops, popularly known as the blind eel catfish, is a species of airbreathing catfish found in the lower Congo River basin in the countries of the Democratic Republic of the Congo and the Republic of the Congo. It is blind, non-pigmented and grows to a length of 5.7 cm (2.2 in) SL.
