= Louise Schilthuis =

Dutch zoologist

Louise Schilthuis (16 December 1863, Groningen – 27 January 1951, The Hague), also known as Lubbina Schilthuis, was a Dutch zoologist and a curator at the Zoology Museum at the University of Utrecht. She was active in the late 19th century and published at least two papers, both describing new species, on the specimens collected in the Congo by M.A. Greshof, a Dutch collector and trader, on the amphibians in 1889 and on the fishes on 1891. Boulenger named the mormyrid Marcusenius schilthuisiae after her.

== Bibliography ==
- 1889 On small collection of Amphibia from the Congo with a description of a new species Ned. Dierk. Ver Tijdschr 2 pp285-286
- 1890 On a collection of fishes from the Congo with descriptions of some new species Ned. Dierk. Ver Tijdschr 3 pp83-92

== Taxa named ==
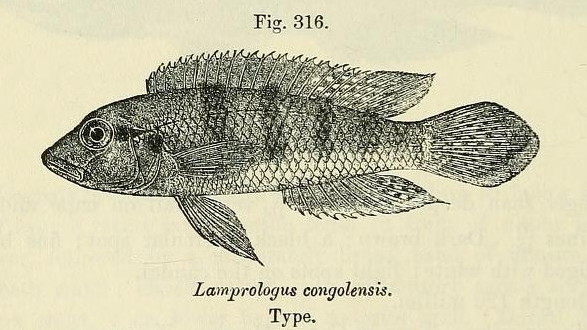
Lamprologus congoensis, named by Schilthuis

Among the taxa named by Schilthuis, she described the cichlid genus Lamprologus and its type species Lamprologus congoensis.

She also described Synodontis angelicus in 1891.
