= Stauch =

Stauch is a German surname that appears to have originated in the vicinity encompassing the German state of Baden-Württemberg and the Swiss canton of Thurgau. Some branches of the family that emigrated to the United States of America anglicized it to Stough.

People with this surname include:

- Alfred Stauch, ichthyologist (Bothus, Chiloglanis, Chiloglanis benuensis, Chiloglanis voltae, Dagetichthys lakdoensis, Dalophis, Dasyatis, Eleotridae, Niger stingray, Phractura, Spinycheek sleepers, Zaireichthys, Zaireichthys camerunensis)
- August Stauch, Swiss railway worker, amateur mineralogist, prospector and investor (instigator of the early 20th-century diamond rush in German South-West Africa)
- Birgit Stauch, German sculptor
- Daniela Stauch (born 1989), German politician
- Edward Stauch, American painter/sculptor (creator of Hospital Gangrene of an Arm Stump, this painting and Night at the Horticultural Center in Philadelphia)
- Gannon Stauch, American murder victim
- Hellmut Wilhelm E. Stauch, German-South African watercraft designer (O-Jolle) and Olympian (sailor in the 1952 Summer Olympics and 1960 Summer Olympics)
- Richard Stauch, German music composer (The Star of Valencia)
- Robert Stauch, German politician
- Scott Stauch, American football player (one-season member of the New Orleans Saints)
- Thomen Stauch, German drummer (member of the bands Blind Guardian, Coldseed, Iron Savior, Savage Circus and Seelenzorn)
- Willi Stauch, German motorcycle racer (1980 European solo grasstrack champion)
