= Leptoglanis bouilloni =

Conservation status
- Data Deficient (IUCN 3.1)

Scientific classification
- Domain: Eukaryota
- Kingdom: Animalia
- Phylum: Chordata
- Class: Actinopterygii
- Order: Siluriformes
- Family: Amphiliidae
- Genus: Leptoglanis
- Species: L. bouilloni

Binomial name
- Leptoglanis bouilloni Poll, 1959

Species of catfish

Leptoglanis bouilloni is a species of catfish in the genus Leptoglanis. It is found in the Congo River basin in the Democratic Republic of the Congo. Its length reaches 6.2 cm.
