= Leptoglanis xenognathus =

Conservation status
- Least Concern (IUCN 3.1)

Scientific classification
- Domain: Eukaryota
- Kingdom: Animalia
- Phylum: Chordata
- Class: Actinopterygii
- Order: Siluriformes
- Family: Amphiliidae
- Genus: Leptoglanis
- Species: L. xenognathus

Binomial name
- Leptoglanis xenognathus Boulenger, 1902

Species of fish

Leptoglanis xenognathus is a species of loach catfish found in the Congo River Basin in the countries of the Central African Republic and the Democratic Republic of Congo. This fish grows to about 7.8 centimetres (3.1 in) TL.
