= Zaireichthys wamiensis =

Conservation status
- Vulnerable (IUCN 3.1)

Scientific classification
- Kingdom: Animalia
- Phylum: Chordata
- Class: Actinopterygii
- Order: Siluriformes
- Family: Amphiliidae
- Genus: Zaireichthys
- Species: Z. wamiensis

Binomial name
- Zaireichthys wamiensis (Seegers, 1989)

Synonyms
- Leptoglanis wamiensis Seegers, 1989

Species of fish

Zaireichthys wamiensis is a species of loach catfish endemic to Tanzania. It grows to a length of 2.5 cm (0.98 in) SL. Its natural habitat is rivers.|

== Threats ==
Increased susceptibility to local habitat degradation is a consequence of its limited distribution.
