= Doumea chappuisi =

Conservation status
- Least Concern (IUCN 3.1)

Scientific classification
- Kingdom: Animalia
- Phylum: Chordata
- Class: Actinopterygii
- Order: Siluriformes
- Family: Amphiliidae
- Genus: Doumea
- Species: D. chappuisi

Binomial name
- Doumea chappuisi Pellegrin, 1933

Species of fish

Doumea chappuisi is a species of loach catfish found in the coastal rivers of Guinea, Ivory Coast, Liberia and Guinea-Bissau. It reaches a length of 11.4 cm.

The fish is named in honor of French-born Swiss zoologist and biospeleologist Pierre-Alfred Chappuis (1891-1960), who collected the type specimen.
