= Phractura gladysae =

Conservation status
- Data Deficient (IUCN 3.1)

Scientific classification
- Domain: Eukaryota
- Kingdom: Animalia
- Phylum: Chordata
- Class: Actinopterygii
- Order: Siluriformes
- Family: Amphiliidae
- Genus: Phractura
- Species: P. gladysae

Binomial name
- Phractura gladysae Pellegrin, 1931

Species of catfish

Phractura gladysae is a species of catfish in the genus Phractura. It is found in the upper Louesse River in the Republic of the Congo. It has a length of 14 cm.
