= Doumea gracila =

Conservation status
- Vulnerable (IUCN 3.1)

Scientific classification
- Kingdom: Animalia
- Phylum: Chordata
- Class: Actinopterygii
- Order: Siluriformes
- Family: Amphiliidae
- Genus: Doumea
- Species: D. gracila

Binomial name
- Doumea gracila Skelton, 2007

Species of catfish

Doumea gracila is a species of catfish in the genus Doumea. It lives from Nyong to the Ntem rivers in southern Cameroon.
