= Zaireichthys flavomaculatus =

Conservation status
- Data Deficient (IUCN 3.1)

Scientific classification
- Kingdom: Animalia
- Phylum: Chordata
- Class: Actinopterygii
- Order: Siluriformes
- Family: Amphiliidae
- Genus: Zaireichthys
- Species: Z. flavomaculatus

Binomial name
- Zaireichthys flavomaculatus (Pellegrin, 1926)

Synonyms
- Leptoglanis flavomaculatus Pellegrin, 1926

Species of fish

Zaireichthys flavomaculatus is a species of loach catfish endemic to the Democratic Republic of the Congo where it is only found in the Lulua River. It reaches a length of 3.9 cm. The humeral process of the pectoral girdle is moderately long with poorly developed or fine denticulations.
