= Trachyglanis ineac =

Conservation status
- Least Concern (IUCN 3.1)

Scientific classification
- Kingdom: Animalia
- Phylum: Chordata
- Class: Actinopterygii
- Order: Siluriformes
- Family: Amphiliidae
- Genus: Trachyglanis
- Species: T. ineac

Binomial name
- Trachyglanis ineac (Poll, 1954)

Synonyms
- Phractura ineac Poll, 1954

Species of fish

Trachyglanis ineac is a species of loach catfish endemic to the Democratic Republic of the Congo where it is found in the Congo, Tshuapa, Lomela and Lomami Rivers. It grows to a length of 10.1 cm (4.0 in).
