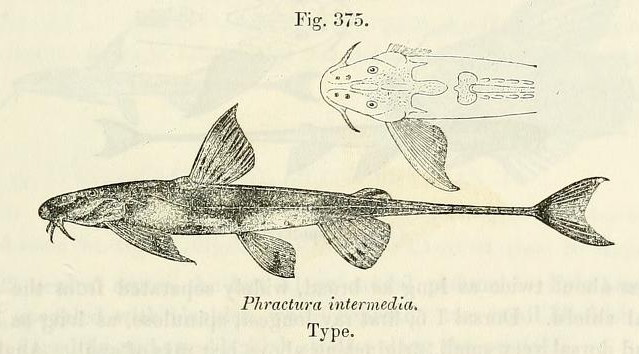

Scientific classification
- Domain: Eukaryota
- Kingdom: Animalia
- Phylum: Chordata
- Class: Actinopterygii
- Order: Siluriformes
- Family: Amphiliidae
- Genus: Phractura
- Species: P. intermedia

Binomial name
- Phractura intermedia Boulenger, 1902

= Phractura intermedia =

Species of catfish

Phractura intermedia is a species of catfish in the genus Phractura. It is found in coastal rivers in Africa from the Nyong River to the Kouilou River. It has a length of 9.5 cm.
