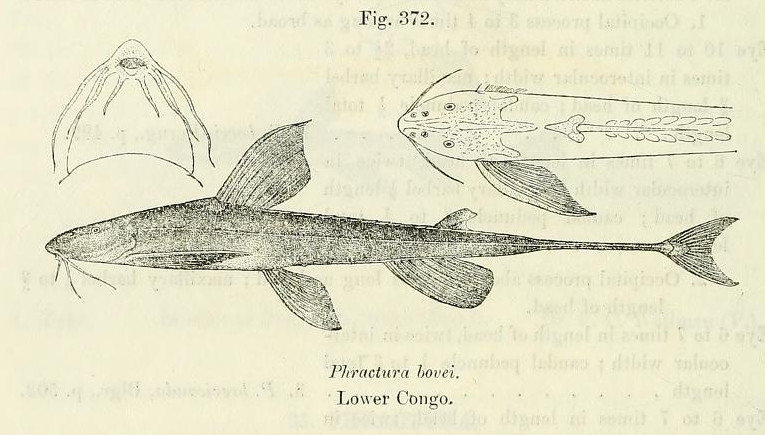

Scientific classification
- Kingdom: Animalia
- Phylum: Chordata
- Class: Actinopterygii
- Order: Siluriformes
- Family: Amphiliidae
- Genus: Phractura
- Species: P. bovei

Binomial name
- Phractura bovei Perugia, 1892

= Phractura bovei =

Species of fish

Phractura bovei is a species of catfish that lives in the Lower Congo River. It lives in a freshwater habitat. Its total recorded length is 11 cm.
