= Doumea stilicauda =

Scientific classification
- Kingdom: Animalia
- Phylum: Chordata
- Class: Actinopterygii
- Division: Teleostei
- Order: Siluriformes
- Family: Amphiliidae
- Genus: Doumea
- Species: D. stilicauda

Binomial name
- Doumea stilicauda Ferraris, Skelton & Vari, 2010

Species of catfish

Doumea stilicauda is a species of loach catfish in the genus Doumea. It is only known to live in the So'o River, a tributary of the Nyong River, in Cameroon. Its length reaches 17.5 cm (6.9 in).
