= Congoglanis inga =

Scientific classification
- Kingdom: Animalia
- Phylum: Chordata
- Class: Actinopterygii
- Order: Siluriformes
- Family: Amphiliidae
- Genus: Congoglanis
- Species: C. inga

Binomial name
- Congoglanis inga Ferraris, Vari, P. H. Skelton, 2011

Species of catfish

Congoglanis inga is a species of catfish in the genus Congoglanis. It lives in the Congo River near the Inga I Dam in the Democratic Republic of the Congo. Its length reaches 11.1 cm.

== Etymology ==
The fish is named after the Inga Rapids, which is near the type locality in the lower Congo River, Democratic Republic of the Congo.
