= Belonoglanis brieni =

Conservation status
- Data Deficient (IUCN 3.1)

Scientific classification
- Kingdom: Animalia
- Phylum: Chordata
- Class: Actinopterygii
- Order: Siluriformes
- Family: Amphiliidae
- Genus: Belonoglanis
- Species: B. brieni

Binomial name
- Belonoglanis brieni Poll, 1959

Species of fish

Belonoglanis brieni is a species of loach catfish that is probably endemic to the Democratic Republic of the Congo where it is found around Pool Malebo with questionable occurrence in the Republic of the Congo. It reaches a length of 5 cm.
