= Phractura clauseni =

Conservation status
- Least Concern (IUCN 3.1)

Scientific classification
- Kingdom: Animalia
- Phylum: Chordata
- Class: Actinopterygii
- Order: Siluriformes
- Family: Amphiliidae
- Genus: Phractura
- Species: P. clauseni

Binomial name
- Phractura clauseni Daget & Stauch, 1963

Species of fish

Phractura clauseni is a species of catfish in the genus Phractura that lives in freshwater rivers across West Africa. It is named in honor of Danish ichthyologist Herluf Stenholt Clausen.
