= Amphilius lujani =

Conservation status
- Least Concern (IUCN 3.1)

Scientific classification
- Kingdom: Animalia
- Phylum: Chordata
- Class: Actinopterygii
- Order: Siluriformes
- Family: Amphiliidae
- Genus: Amphilius
- Species: A. lujani

Binomial name
- Amphilius lujani Thomson, Page, & Hilber, 2015

Species of fish

Amphilius lujani is a species of fish in the family Amphiliidae, first found in the Lake Kyoga drainage, as well as the northeastern tributaries of Lake Victoria and Lake Manyara basin.
