= Paramphilius trichomycteroides =

Conservation status
- Least Concern (IUCN 3.1)

Scientific classification
- Kingdom: Animalia
- Phylum: Chordata
- Class: Actinopterygii
- Order: Siluriformes
- Family: Amphiliidae
- Genus: Paramphilius
- Species: P. trichomycteroides

Binomial name
- Paramphilius trichomycteroides Pellegrin, 1907

Species of fish

Paramphilius trichomycteroides is a species of loach catfish found in Guinea, Guinea-Bissau, Liberia, Senegal and Sierra Leone. It grows to a length of 5.9 cm.
