= Phractura stiassny =

Conservation status
- Data Deficient (IUCN 3.1)

Scientific classification
- Kingdom: Animalia
- Phylum: Chordata
- Class: Actinopterygii
- Order: Siluriformes
- Family: Amphiliidae
- Genus: Phractura
- Species: P. stiassny

Binomial name
- Phractura stiassny Skelton, 2007

Species of catfish

Phractura stiassny is a species of catfish in the genus Phractura. It has a length of 11.5 cm. It is only known from a single specimen from the Nyanga River in Gabon.
