= Amphilius lamani =

Conservation status
- Endangered (IUCN 3.1)

Scientific classification
- Kingdom: Animalia
- Phylum: Chordata
- Class: Actinopterygii
- Order: Siluriformes
- Family: Amphiliidae
- Genus: Amphilius
- Species: A. lamani

Binomial name
- Amphilius lamani Lönnberg and Rendahl, 1920

Species of catfish

Amphilius lamani is a species of catfish in the genus Amphilius. It is found in the lower Congo River. Its length reaches 9.6 cm.
