= Paramphilius baudoni =

Conservation status
- Least Concern (IUCN 3.1)

Scientific classification
- Kingdom: Animalia
- Phylum: Chordata
- Class: Actinopterygii
- Order: Siluriformes
- Family: Amphiliidae
- Genus: Paramphilius
- Species: P. baudoni

Binomial name
- Paramphilius baudoni (Pellegrin, 1928)

Synonyms
- Paramphilius goodi Harry, 1953

Species of fish

Paramphilius baudoni is a species of loach catfish found in Cameroon, the Republic of Congo and Gabon. It reaches a length of 7.5 cm (3.0 in).
