= Zaireichthys dorae =

Conservation status
- Data Deficient (IUCN 3.1)

Scientific classification
- Kingdom: Animalia
- Phylum: Chordata
- Class: Actinopterygii
- Order: Siluriformes
- Family: Amphiliidae
- Genus: Zaireichthys
- Species: Z. dorae

Binomial name
- Zaireichthys dorae (Poll, 1967)

Synonyms
- Leptoglanis dorae Poll, 1967

Species of fish

Zaireichthys dorae, the Chobe sand catlet, is a species of loach catfish endemic to Angola where it is only found in the Rio Luachimo. It reaches a length of 2.7 cm. The humeral process of the pectoral girdle is moderately long with poorly developed or fine denticulations. The neural and hemal spines tend to be simple and slender. This species occurs over sand and is usually buried with just the eyes protruding.
