= Amphilius kakrimensis =

Conservation status
- Vulnerable (IUCN 3.1)

Scientific classification
- Kingdom: Animalia
- Phylum: Chordata
- Class: Actinopterygii
- Order: Siluriformes
- Family: Amphiliidae
- Genus: Amphilius
- Species: A. kakrimensis

Binomial name
- Amphilius kakrimensis Teugels, Skelton & Lévêque, 1987

Species of catfish

Amphilius kakrimensis is a species of catfish in the genus Amphilius. It is found in the Kolenté River and Kakrima River, a tributary of the Kolenté River, in Guinea. Its length reaches 4.2 cm.
