= Amphilius cryptobullatus =

Conservation status
- Least Concern (IUCN 3.1)

Scientific classification
- Kingdom: Animalia
- Phylum: Chordata
- Class: Actinopterygii
- Order: Siluriformes
- Family: Amphiliidae
- Genus: Amphilius
- Species: A. cryptobullatus

Binomial name
- Amphilius cryptobullatus Skelton, 1986

Species of catfish

Amphilius cryptobullatus is a species of catfish in the genus Amphilius. It is endemic to the Luongo River in the upper Congo system in Zambia. Its length reaches 13.5 cm.
