= Paramphilius teugelsi =

Conservation status
- Least Concern (IUCN 3.1)

Scientific classification
- Kingdom: Animalia
- Phylum: Chordata
- Class: Actinopterygii
- Order: Siluriformes
- Family: Amphiliidae
- Genus: Paramphilius
- Species: P. teugelsi

Binomial name
- Paramphilius teugelsi P. H. Skelton, 1989

Species of fish

Paramphilius teugelsi is a species of loach catfish found in Guinea and Sierra Leone in the Mamou and Kogon Rivers. It grows to a length of 5.1 cm.

The fish is named in honor of Guy Teugels (1954-2003) who as the curator of fishes at the Musée Royale de l'Afrique Centrale contributed to the further knowledge of West-African freshwater fishes.
