= Mountain barbel =

Conservation status
- Least Concern (IUCN 3.1)

Scientific classification
- Kingdom: Animalia
- Phylum: Chordata
- Class: Actinopterygii
- Order: Siluriformes
- Family: Amphiliidae
- Genus: Amphilius
- Species: A. platychir

Binomial name
- Amphilius platychir Günther, 1864

Species of fish

The mountain barbel (Amphilius platychir) is a species of fish in the genus Amphilius. Its length reaches 9.2 cm.

It has two subspecies: Amphilius platychir platychir, which is found in the upper tributaries of the Senegal, Niger, Gambia, Corubal, Konkouré and Little Scarcies rivers in West Africa, and Amphilius platychir marmoratus, which is found in the Lofa, Saint Paul, and Cavalla rivers in southeastern Guinea.
