= Amphilius kivuensis =

Scientific classification
- Domain: Eukaryota
- Kingdom: Animalia
- Phylum: Chordata
- Class: Actinopterygii
- Order: Siluriformes
- Family: Amphiliidae
- Genus: Amphilius
- Species: A. kivuensis

Binomial name
- Amphilius kivuensis Pellegrin, 1933

Species of catfish

Amphilius kivuensis is a species of catfish in the genus Amphilius. It is found in rivers in the Democratic Republic of the Congo, Rwanda, Burundi, and Tanzania. Its length reaches 10.6 cm.
