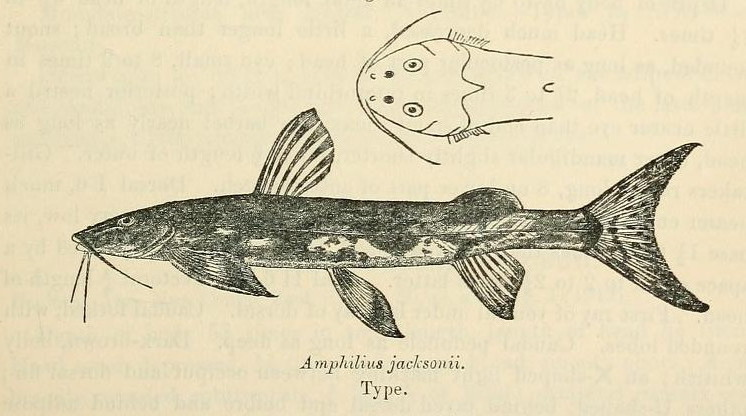

Conservation status
- Least Concern (IUCN 3.1)

Scientific classification
- Kingdom: Animalia
- Phylum: Chordata
- Class: Actinopterygii
- Order: Siluriformes
- Family: Amphiliidae
- Genus: Amphilius
- Species: A. jacksonii

Binomial name
- Amphilius jacksonii Boulenger, 1912

= Marbled mountain catfish =

Species of fish

The marbled mountain catfish (Amphilius jacksonii) is a species of fish in the family Amphiliidae. It is found in Burundi, Kenya, Tanzania, and Uganda. Its natural habitat is rivers.
