= Zaireichthys zonatus =

Conservation status
- Data Deficient (IUCN 3.1)

Scientific classification
- Kingdom: Animalia
- Phylum: Chordata
- Class: Actinopterygii
- Order: Siluriformes
- Family: Amphiliidae
- Genus: Zaireichthys
- Species: Z. zonatus

Binomial name
- Zaireichthys zonatus T. R. Roberts, 1967

Species of fish

Zaireichthys zonatus is a species of loach catfish endemic to the Democratic Republic of the Congo where it is found in the rapids just below Pool Malebo. It grows to a length of 2.5 cm. Its body has vertical bands with darkened margins. The humeral process of the pectoral girdle is short and with a few fine denticulations at its tips. The dorsal and pectoral fins have strong and stout spines. Z. zonatus is found only at the edges of a sandy areas, although their habitat is very rocky.
