= Paramphilius firestonei =

Conservation status
- Endangered (IUCN 3.1)

Scientific classification
- Kingdom: Animalia
- Phylum: Chordata
- Class: Actinopterygii
- Order: Siluriformes
- Family: Amphiliidae
- Genus: Paramphilius
- Species: P. firestonei

Binomial name
- Paramphilius firestonei L. P. Schultz, 1942

Species of fish

Paramphilius firestonei is a species of loach catfish endemic to Liberia where it is found in the St. Paul, Du and Borlor Rivers. It reaches a length of 6.1 cm.
