= Zaireichthys heterurus =

Conservation status
- Least Concern (IUCN 3.1)

Scientific classification
- Kingdom: Animalia
- Phylum: Chordata
- Class: Actinopterygii
- Order: Siluriformes
- Family: Amphiliidae
- Genus: Zaireichthys
- Species: Z. heterurus

Binomial name
- Zaireichthys heterurus T. R. Roberts, 2003

Species of fish

Zaireichthys heterurus is a species of loach catfish endemic to the Democratic Republic of the Congo where it is found in the Lualaba River. It reaches a length of 3.5 cm and has a broad, black collar just behind the head. The barbels are attenuate, with the maxillary barbels extending posteriorly to middle to end of the pectoral fin spine and the caudal peduncle is slender. The humeral process of the pectoral girdle is long and stout without denticulations. The caudal fin is deeply forked, with the upper lobe much shorter and smaller than the lower lobe; also, the fin rays in lower lobe noticeable thicker than those in upper lobe.
