= Tetracamphilius clandestinus =

Conservation status
- Data Deficient (IUCN 3.1)

Scientific classification
- Domain: Eukaryota
- Kingdom: Animalia
- Phylum: Chordata
- Class: Actinopterygii
- Order: Siluriformes
- Family: Amphiliidae
- Genus: Tetracamphilius
- Species: T. clandestinus

Binomial name
- Tetracamphilius clandestinus T. R. Roberts, 2003

Species of fish

Tetracamphilius clandestinus is a species of loach catfish endemic to the Central African Republic where it is found in the Ubangui River. It grows to a length of 2.0 cm.
