= Doumea reidi =

Conservation status
- Data Deficient (IUCN 3.1)

Scientific classification
- Kingdom: Animalia
- Phylum: Chordata
- Class: Actinopterygii
- Order: Siluriformes
- Family: Amphiliidae
- Genus: Doumea
- Species: D. reidi

Binomial name
- Doumea reidi Ferraris, Skelton & Vari, 2010

Species of catfish

Doumea reidi is a species of catfish in the genus Doumea. It lives in the Mbam River in Nigeria. Its length reaches 9.3 cm.
