= Congoglanis sagitta =

Scientific classification
- Kingdom: Animalia
- Phylum: Chordata
- Class: Actinopterygii
- Order: Siluriformes
- Family: Amphiliidae
- Genus: Congoglanis
- Species: C. sagitta

Binomial name
- Congoglanis sagitta Ferraris, Vari & P. H. Skelton, 2011

Species of catfish

Congoglanis sagitta is a species of catfish in the genus Congoglanis. It lives in the upper Congo River basin, specifically in tributaries of Lake Mweru, Luangwa River and Chambeshi River in Zambia.

== Length ==
Its length reaches 13.6 centimetres (5.4 in).

== Etymology ==
The fish's name is Latin for arrow, which refers to its slender, streamlined shape relative to that of its fellow genus fish.
