= Tetracamphilius angustifrons =

Conservation status
- Data Deficient (IUCN 3.1)

Scientific classification
- Domain: Eukaryota
- Kingdom: Animalia
- Phylum: Chordata
- Class: Actinopterygii
- Order: Siluriformes
- Family: Amphiliidae
- Genus: Tetracamphilius
- Species: T. angustifrons

Binomial name
- Tetracamphilius angustifrons (Boulenger, 1902)

Species of fish

Tetracamphilius angustifrons is a species of loach catfish found in the Central African Republic and the Democratic Republic of the Congo where it occurs in the Ubangui River. It grows to a length of 3.9 cm and has a relatively elongate snout with an enlarged olfactory organ.
