= Andersonia =

Andersonia may refer to:

- Andersonia, California, a community in Mendocino County
- Andersonia (fish), a genus of loach catfish containing the single species Andersonia leptura
- Andersonia (plant), a genus of plants in the family Ericaceae
- Andersonia, a former genus in the family Rubiaceae that has been synonymized with Gaertnera
- Stylidium subg. Andersonia, a subgenus of Stylidium
- Stylidium sect. Andersonia, a section of Stylidium
