= Dolichamphilius brieni =

Conservation status
- Vulnerable (IUCN 3.1)

Scientific classification
- Kingdom: Animalia
- Phylum: Chordata
- Class: Actinopterygii
- Order: Siluriformes
- Family: Amphiliidae
- Genus: Dolichamphilius
- Species: D. brieni

Binomial name
- Dolichamphilius brieni (Poll, 1959)

Synonyms
- Leptoglanis brieni Poll, 1959

Species of fish

Dolichamphilius brieni is a species of loach catfish endemic to the Democratic Republic of the Congo where it is found in Pool Malebo. It reaches a length of 5.4 centimetres (2.1 in).
