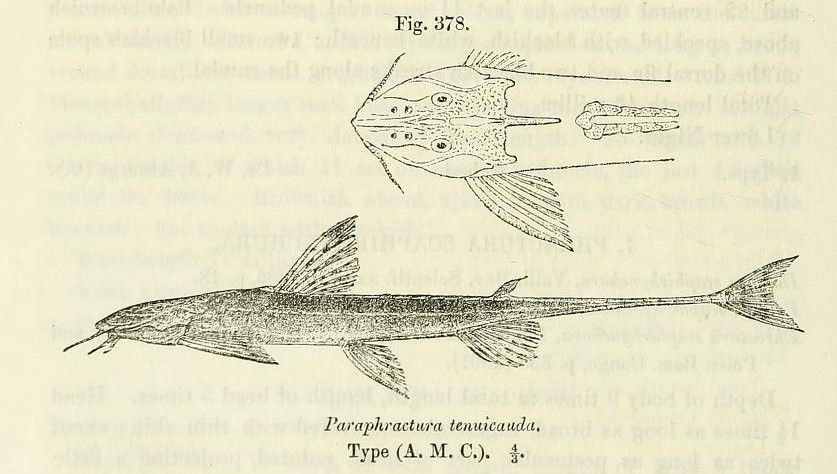

Conservation status
- Least Concern (IUCN 3.1)

Scientific classification
- Domain: Eukaryota
- Kingdom: Animalia
- Phylum: Chordata
- Class: Actinopterygii
- Order: Siluriformes
- Family: Amphiliidae
- Genus: Phractura
- Species: P. longicauda

Binomial name
- Phractura longicauda Boulenger, 1902

= Phractura longicauda =

Species of catfish

Phractura longicauda is a species of catfish in the genus Phractura. It is found in the coastal rivers of south Cameroon, Equatorial Guinea, and the Congo River basin. It has a length of three inches.
