= Congoglanis howesi =

Scientific classification
- Kingdom: Animalia
- Phylum: Chordata
- Class: Actinopterygii
- Order: Siluriformes
- Family: Amphiliidae
- Genus: Congoglanis
- Species: C. howesi

Binomial name
- Congoglanis howesi Vari, Ferraris & P. H. Skelton, 2012

Species of catfish

Congoglanis howesi is a species of catfish in the genus Congoglanis. It lives in the Luachimo River in Angola.

== Length ==
Its length reaches 11.3 cm.

== Etymology ==
The fish is named in honor of ichthyologist Gordon J. Howes (1938–2013), of the Natural History Museum (London), because of his many contributions to ichthyology.
