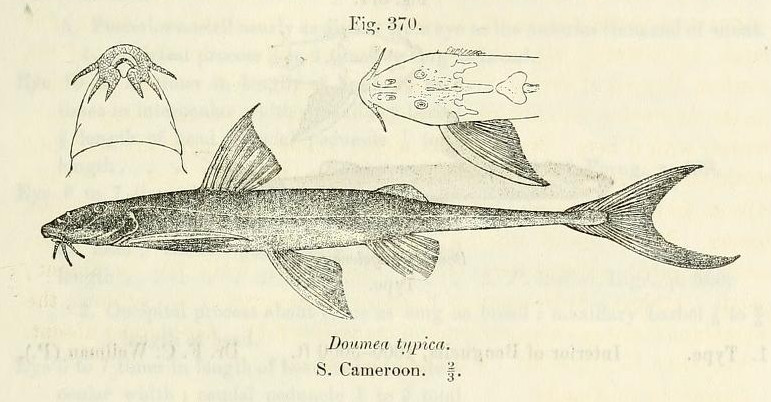
- Doumea typica

Scientific classification
- Kingdom: Animalia
- Phylum: Chordata
- Class: Actinopterygii
- Order: Siluriformes
- Family: Amphiliidae
- Subfamily: Doumeinae; Regan, 1911

Genera
- Andersonia; Belonoglanis; Congoglanis; Doumea; Phractura; Trachyglanis

= Doumeinae =

Subfamily of fishes

Doumeinae is one of three subfamilies of the loach catfish family Amphiliidae, it consists of six genera which are endemic to the Afrotropics. There are currently 33 species classified as members of the subfamily, some of which are infrequently traded as part of the aquarium trade. They are small catfish measuring between 45mm and 175mm.
