= Amphilius frieli =

Scientific classification
- Domain: Eukaryota
- Kingdom: Animalia
- Phylum: Chordata
- Class: Actinopterygii
- Order: Siluriformes
- Family: Amphiliidae
- Genus: Amphilius
- Species: A. frieli

Binomial name
- Amphilius frieli Thomson, Page, & Hilber, 2015

Species of fish

Amphilius frieli is a species of fish in the family Amphiliidae, first found in the upper Congo Basin.
