= Amphilius athiensis =

Conservation status
- Vulnerable (IUCN 3.1)

Scientific classification
- Kingdom: Animalia
- Phylum: Chordata
- Class: Actinopterygii
- Order: Siluriformes
- Family: Amphiliidae
- Genus: Amphilius
- Species: A. athiensis

Binomial name
- Amphilius athiensis Thomson & Page, 2010

Species of catfish

Amphilius athiensis is a species of catfish in the genus Amphilius. It lives in the Athi and Galana River system. Its length reaches 16 cm.
