= Stough =

Stough is a surname, and it can be an anglicization of the German/Swiss surname Stauch. It may refer to:

== People ==
- Bessie Callender (née Stough; 1889–1951), American sculptor
- Carl Stough (1926–2000), American choral conductor
- Con Stough, Australian neuroscientist
- Eric Stough (born 1972), American animation director/producer
- Bill Stough (1928–2004), American clergyman, Bishop of the Episcopal Diocese of Alabama
- John Stough (1762–1845), German-American Lutheran minister

== See also ==
- John Stough Bobbs (1809–1870), American surgeon and educator
