= Amphilius lampei =

Conservation status
- Data Deficient (IUCN 3.1)

Scientific classification
- Kingdom: Animalia
- Phylum: Chordata
- Class: Actinopterygii
- Order: Siluriformes
- Family: Amphiliidae
- Genus: Amphilius
- Species: A. lampei

Binomial name
- Amphilius lampei Pietschmann, 1913

Species of catfish

Amphilius lampei is a species of catfish in the genus Amphilius. It is found in tributaries of the Shebelle River near Harar. Its length reaches 10 cm.
