= Tetracamphilius pectinatus =

Conservation status
- Data Deficient (IUCN 3.1)

Scientific classification
- Domain: Eukaryota
- Kingdom: Animalia
- Phylum: Chordata
- Class: Actinopterygii
- Order: Siluriformes
- Family: Amphiliidae
- Genus: Tetracamphilius
- Species: T. pectinatus

Binomial name
- Tetracamphilius pectinatus T. R. Roberts, 2003

Species of fish

Tetracamphilius pectinatus is a species of loach catfish that is found in the Central African Republic and the Democratic Republic of the Congo. It reaches a length of 3.4 cm and has a serrated pectoral fin spine (the serrae are very small) which lacks a locking mechanism. It also has a colour pattern consisting of a series of bands with a paler inner part and darkened margins; the dark narrow bands are a dark chocolate brown, the dorsum of the head and areas between the narrow bands are tan or orangish tan, and the abdomen and other pale areas are cream-colored.
