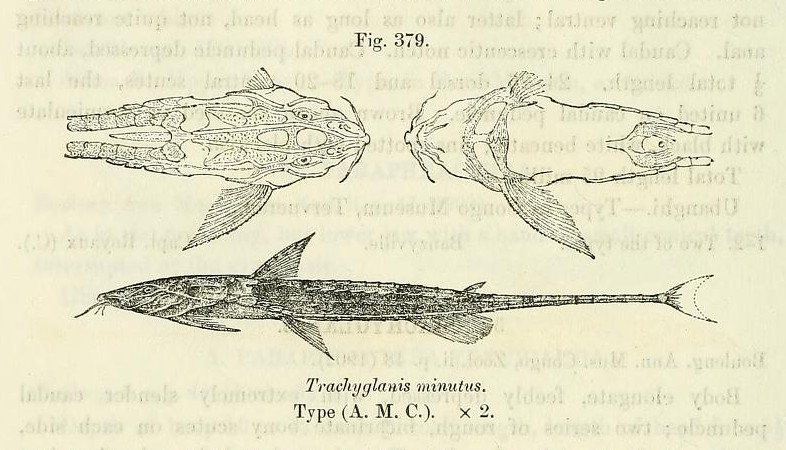

Conservation status
- Data Deficient (IUCN 3.1)

Scientific classification
- Domain: Eukaryota
- Kingdom: Animalia
- Phylum: Chordata
- Class: Actinopterygii
- Order: Siluriformes
- Family: Amphiliidae
- Genus: Trachyglanis
- Species: T. minutus

Binomial name
- Trachyglanis minutus Boulenger, 1902

= Trachyglanis minutus =

Species of fish

Trachyglanis minutus is a species of loach catfish found in the Ubangi River in the Republic of the Congo and the Democratic Republic of the Congo. It grows to a length of 5.0 cm.
