= Amphilius ruziziensis =

Scientific classification
- Kingdom: Animalia
- Phylum: Chordata
- Class: Actinopterygii
- Order: Siluriformes
- Family: Amphiliidae
- Genus: Amphilius
- Species: A. ruziziensis

Binomial name
- Amphilius ruziziensis Thomson, Page, & Hilber, 2015

Species of fish

Amphilius ruziziensis is a species of fish in the family Amphiliidae, first found in the Ruzizi River drainage, as well as the northeastern tributaries of Lake Tanganyika.
