= Phractura macrura =

Conservation status
- Data Deficient (IUCN 3.1)

Scientific classification
- Domain: Eukaryota
- Kingdom: Animalia
- Phylum: Chordata
- Class: Actinopterygii
- Order: Siluriformes
- Family: Amphiliidae
- Genus: Phractura
- Species: P. macrura

Binomial name
- Phractura macrura Poll, 1967

Species of catfish

Phractura macrura is a species of catfish in the genus Phractura. It is found in rivers in Angola. It has a length of 9.1 cm.
