= Phractura fasciata =

Scientific classification
- Kingdom: Animalia
- Phylum: Chordata
- Class: Actinopterygii
- Order: Siluriformes
- Family: Amphiliidae
- Genus: Phractura
- Species: P. fasciata

Binomial name
- Phractura fasciata Boulenger, 1911

Species of fish

Phractura fasciata is a species of catfish in the genus Phractura that is found in the Congo River. It has a size is 12.5 cm SL.
