= Doumea sanaga =

Conservation status
- Least Concern (IUCN 3.1)

Scientific classification
- Kingdom: Animalia
- Phylum: Chordata
- Class: Actinopterygii
- Order: Siluriformes
- Family: Amphiliidae
- Genus: Doumea
- Species: D. sanaga

Binomial name
- Doumea sanaga Skelton, 2007

Species of catfish

Doumea sanaga is a species of catfish in the genus Doumea. It lives in the upper Sanaga River in Cameroon, which it is also named after. Its length reaches 8 cm.
