= Amphilius dimonikensis =

Conservation status
- Vulnerable (IUCN 3.1)

Scientific classification
- Kingdom: Animalia
- Phylum: Chordata
- Class: Actinopterygii
- Order: Siluriformes
- Family: Amphiliidae
- Genus: Amphilius
- Species: A. dimonikensis

Binomial name
- Amphilius dimonikensis Skelton, 2007

Species of catfish

Amphilius dimonikensis is a species of catfish in the genus Amphilius. It is endemic to the Mpoulou River in Mayombe, Republic of the Congo. Its length reaches 5.6 cm.
