= Amphilius brevis =

Conservation status
- Least Concern (IUCN 3.1)

Scientific classification
- Kingdom: Animalia
- Phylum: Chordata
- Class: Actinopterygii
- Order: Siluriformes
- Family: Amphiliidae
- Genus: Amphilius
- Species: A. brevis

Binomial name
- Amphilius brevis Boulenger, 1902

Species of catfish

Amphilius brevis is a species of catfish in the genus Amphilius. It lives in the middle and upper Congo River in the Democratic Republic of the Congo. Its length reaches 8.4 cm.
