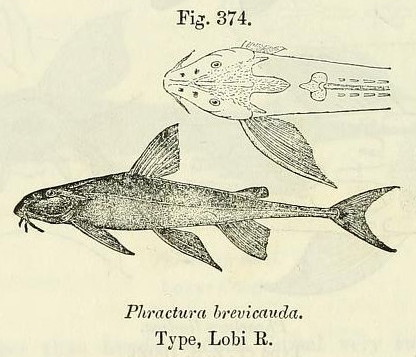

Scientific classification
- Domain: Eukaryota
- Kingdom: Animalia
- Phylum: Chordata
- Class: Actinopterygii
- Order: Siluriformes
- Family: Amphiliidae
- Genus: Phractura
- Species: P. brevicauda

Binomial name
- Phractura brevicauda Boulenger, 1902

= Phractura brevicauda =

Species of fish

Phractura brevicauda is a species of catfish in the genus Phractura. The fish can be found in coastal rivers north of Ogowe River to Loeme River, as well as in the Lobi River and Kribi River, and the Lower Congo River.
