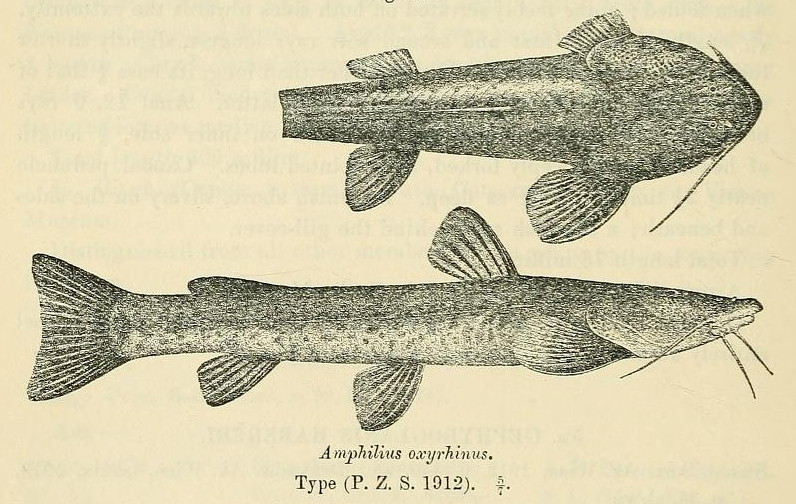
- Amphilius grandis

Conservation status
- Least Concern (IUCN 3.1)

Scientific classification
- Kingdom: Animalia
- Phylum: Chordata
- Class: Actinopterygii
- Order: Siluriformes
- Family: Amphiliidae
- Genus: Amphilius
- Species: A. grandis

Binomial name
- Amphilius grandis Boulenger, 1902

= Amphilius grandis =

Species of catfish

Amphilius grandis is a species of catfish in the genus Amphilius. It is found in the Tana and Ewaso Ng'iro river basins in Kenya. Its length reaches 18.1 cm.
