= Phractura scaphyrhynchura =

Conservation status
- Least Concern (IUCN 3.1)

Scientific classification
- Kingdom: Animalia
- Phylum: Chordata
- Class: Actinopterygii
- Order: Siluriformes
- Family: Amphiliidae
- Genus: Phractura
- Species: P. scaphyrhynchura

Binomial name
- Phractura scaphyrhynchura Vaillant, 1886

Species of catfish

Phractura scaphyrhynchura is a species of catfish in the genus Phractura. It lives in the Ogooué and Congo river systems. It has a length of 15 cm.
