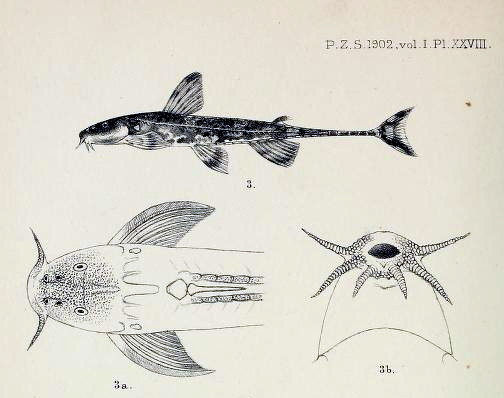

Conservation status
- Least Concern (IUCN 3.1)

Scientific classification
- Domain: Eukaryota
- Kingdom: Animalia
- Phylum: Chordata
- Class: Actinopterygii
- Order: Siluriformes
- Family: Amphiliidae
- Genus: Phractura
- Species: P. lindica

Binomial name
- Phractura lindica Boulenger, 1902

= Phractura lindica =

Species of fish

Phractura lindica is a species of catfish in the genus Phractura. Its length is 9 cm SL. It lives in the Congo River system.
