= Psammphiletria delicata =

Conservation status
- Data Deficient (IUCN 3.1)

Scientific classification
- Kingdom: Animalia
- Phylum: Chordata
- Class: Actinopterygii
- Order: Siluriformes
- Family: Amphiliidae
- Genus: Psammphiletria
- Species: P. delicata

Binomial name
- Psammphiletria delicata T. R. Roberts, 2003

Species of fish

Psammphiletria delicata is a species of loach catfish endemic to Pool Malebo. It grows to a length of 2.0 cm.
