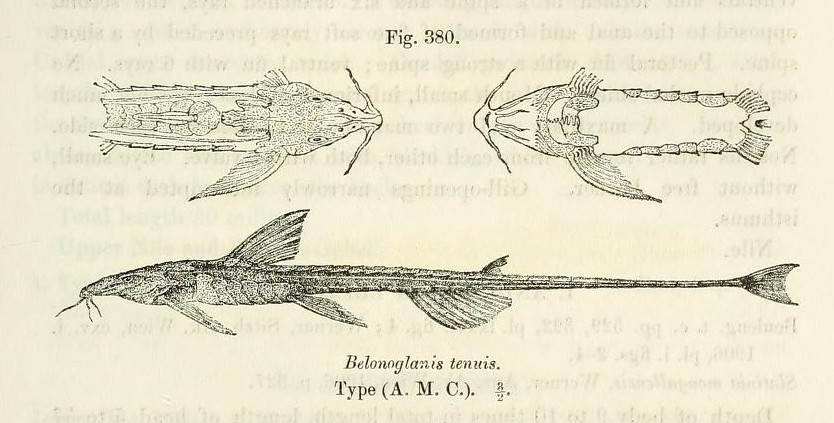

Conservation status
- Least Concern (IUCN 3.1)

Scientific classification
- Domain: Eukaryota
- Kingdom: Animalia
- Phylum: Chordata
- Class: Actinopterygii
- Order: Siluriformes
- Family: Amphiliidae
- Genus: Belonoglanis
- Species: B. tenuis

Binomial name
- Belonoglanis tenuis Boulenger, 1902

= Belonoglanis tenuis =

Species of fish

Belonoglanis tenuis is a species of loach catfish found in the Congo Basin where it occurs in the Congo River basin. It reaches lengths up to 17.2 cm.

== Species Information ==
=== Size ===
The Belonoglanis tenuis usually measures at around 17 centimeters.

=== Identification ===
There is a single row of bony plates from the dorsal fin to the caudal peduncle on the top of the fishes body. The Belonoglanis tenuis is long and thin. They are toothless.
