= Doumea thysi =

Conservation status
- Least Concern (IUCN 3.1)

Scientific classification
- Kingdom: Animalia
- Phylum: Chordata
- Class: Actinopterygii
- Order: Siluriformes
- Family: Amphiliidae
- Genus: Doumea
- Species: D. thysi

Binomial name
- Doumea thysi P. H. Skelton, 1989

Species of fish

Doumea thysi is a species of loach catfish found in Nigeria where it is found in the Cross River and Cameroon where it is found in that country's section of the Cross River and Ndian Department. It reaches a length of 6.5 cm.

the fish is named in honor of ichthyologist Dirk Thys van den Audenaerde (b. 1934) who is the Director at the Musée Royal de l'Afrique Centrale (Tervuren, Belgium), where the type specimen is housed.
