= Amphilius chalei =

Scientific classification
- Kingdom: Animalia
- Phylum: Chordata
- Class: Actinopterygii
- Order: Siluriformes
- Family: Amphiliidae
- Genus: Amphilius
- Species: A. chalei

Binomial name
- Amphilius chalei Seegers, 2008

Species of catfish

Amphilius chalei is a species of catfish in the genus Amphilius.

The Amphilius chalei, is named after Francis M. M. Chale, a Tanzanian environmental scientist.

It is endemic to Lake Malawi, the Ruhuhu drainage catchment and little Ruaha River. It is a freshwater species and can reach 7 cm (2.8 in) in length. It was first described by Lothar Seegers in 2008.
