= Zaireichthys brevis =

Conservation status
- Least Concern (IUCN 3.1)

Scientific classification
- Kingdom: Animalia
- Phylum: Chordata
- Class: Actinopterygii
- Order: Siluriformes
- Family: Amphiliidae
- Genus: Zaireichthys
- Species: Z. brevis

Binomial name
- Zaireichthys brevis (Boulenger, 1915)

Synonyms
- Leptoglanis brevis Boulenger, 1915

Species of fish

Zaireichthys brevis is a species of loach catfish endemic to the Democratic Republic of the Congo where it is found in the Congo River Basin. It reaches a length of 3.4 cm.
