= Trachyglanis sanghensis =

Conservation status
- Data Deficient (IUCN 3.1)

Scientific classification
- Domain: Eukaryota
- Kingdom: Animalia
- Phylum: Chordata
- Class: Actinopterygii
- Order: Siluriformes
- Family: Amphiliidae
- Genus: Trachyglanis
- Species: T. sanghensis

Binomial name
- Trachyglanis sanghensis Pellegrin, 1925

Species of fish

Trachyglanis sanghensis is a species of loach catfish endemic to the Republic of the Congo where it is found in the Sangha River near Ouesso. It grows to a length of 5.0 cm.
