= Trachyglanis intermedius =

Conservation status
- Data Deficient (IUCN 3.1)

Scientific classification
- Kingdom: Animalia
- Phylum: Chordata
- Class: Actinopterygii
- Order: Siluriformes
- Family: Amphiliidae
- Genus: Trachyglanis
- Species: T. intermedius

Binomial name
- Trachyglanis intermedius Pellegrin, 1928

Species of fish

Trachyglanis intermedius is a species of loach catfish endemic to the Democratic Republic of the Congo where it is found in the Lulua River. It grows to a length of 9.0 cm.
