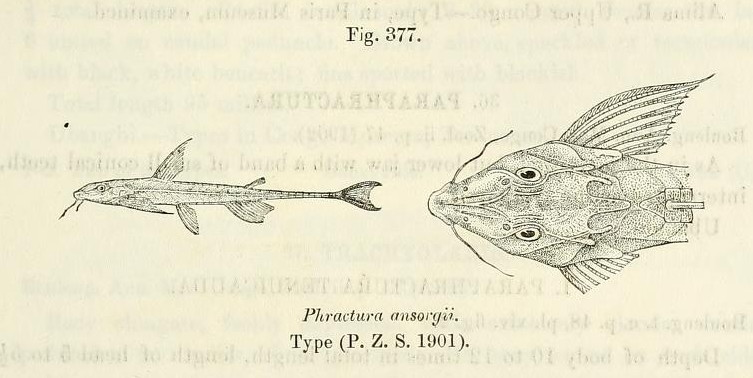

Scientific classification
- Domain: Eukaryota
- Kingdom: Animalia
- Phylum: Chordata
- Class: Actinopterygii
- Order: Siluriformes
- Family: Amphiliidae
- Genus: Phractura
- Species: P. ansorgii

Binomial name
- Phractura ansorgii Boulenger, 1901

= Phractura ansorgii =

Species of fish

Phractura ansorgii, commonly known as the African whiptailed catfish, is a species of catfish in the genus Phractura. They live in the Niger and Oshun rivers in Africa. These fish eat algae. Their length ranges from 8 cm to 10 cm. It is named in honor of William John Ansorge.
