= Dolichamphilius longiceps =

Conservation status
- Data Deficient (IUCN 3.1)

Scientific classification
- Kingdom: Animalia
- Phylum: Chordata
- Class: Actinopterygii
- Division: Teleostei
- Order: Siluriformes
- Family: Amphiliidae
- Genus: Dolichamphilius
- Species: D. longiceps

Binomial name
- Dolichamphilius longiceps T. R. Roberts, 2003

Species of fish

Dolichamphilius longiceps is a species of loach catfish endemic to the Democratic Republic of the Congo where it is found in the Wagenia Rapids on the Lualaba River. D. longiceps was originally dexcribed by American ichthyologist Tyson Royal Roberts in 2003. It reaches a length of 4.2 cm.
