= Tetracamphilius notatus =

Conservation status
- Least Concern (IUCN 3.1)

Scientific classification
- Domain: Eukaryota
- Kingdom: Animalia
- Phylum: Chordata
- Class: Actinopterygii
- Order: Siluriformes
- Family: Amphiliidae
- Genus: Tetracamphilius
- Species: T. notatus

Binomial name
- Tetracamphilius notatus (Nichols & Griscom, 1917)

Species of fish

Tetracamphilius notatus is a species of loach catfish found in the Congo River Basin in the Central African Republic and the Democratic Republic of the Congo. It reaches a length of 3.3 cm and has non-serrate pectoral fin spines, spots instead of bands on the body, and an olfactory organ that is not greatly enlarged. It is a freshwater fish with a tropical climate.
