= Amphilius caudosignatus =

Conservation status
- Endangered (IUCN 3.1)

Scientific classification
- Kingdom: Animalia
- Phylum: Chordata
- Class: Actinopterygii
- Order: Siluriformes
- Family: Amphiliidae
- Genus: Amphilius
- Species: A. caudosignatus

Binomial name
- Amphilius caudosignatus Skelton, 2007

Species of catfish

Amphilius caudosignatus is a species of catfish in the genus Amphilius.

It is found in the southeastern tributaries of the Ogooué River in Gabon. It is a freshwater species and can reach up to 5 cm (2.0 in) in length. The fish has six to seven principal caudal fin rays with a unique coloration consisting of distinct caudal fin colour patterns, dark brown with a white base and a broad oblique white band from mid dorsal to post ventral corner. It was first described by Paul Harvey Skelton in 2007.
