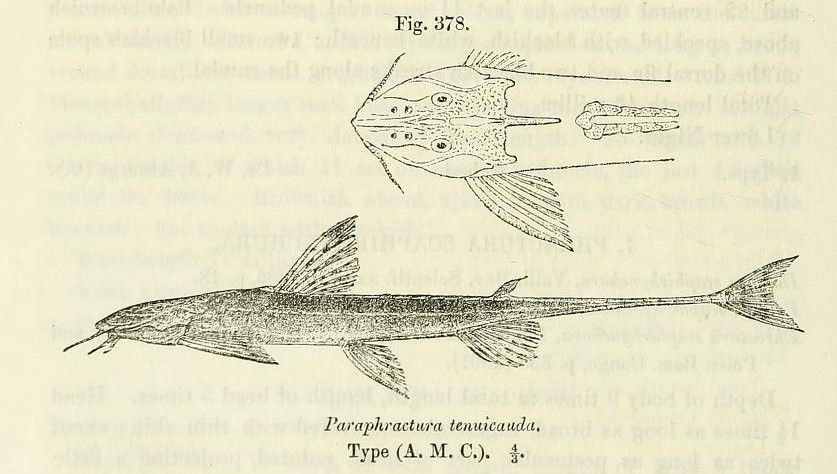

Scientific classification
- Domain: Eukaryota
- Kingdom: Animalia
- Phylum: Chordata
- Class: Actinopterygii
- Order: Siluriformes
- Family: Amphiliidae
- Genus: Phractura
- Species: P. tenuicauda

Binomial name
- Phractura tenuicauda Boulenger, 1902

= Phractura tenuicauda =

Species of catfish

Phractura tenuicauda is a species of catfish in the genus Phractura. It has a length of 9.5 cm. It lives in the Congo river system.
