= Doumea skeltoni =

Scientific classification
- Kingdom: Animalia
- Phylum: Chordata
- Class: Actinopterygii
- Order: Siluriformes
- Family: Amphiliidae
- Genus: Doumea
- Species: D. skeltoni

Binomial name
- Doumea skeltoni Ferraris & Vari, 2014

Species of catfish

Doumea skeltoni is a species of catfish in the genus Doumea. It lives in the Loémé and Kouilou-Niari rivers in the Republic of the Congo. Its length reaches 4.5 cm. It is named after South African ichthyologist Paul H. Skelton.
