= Amphilius krefftii =

Scientific classification
- Domain: Eukaryota
- Kingdom: Animalia
- Phylum: Chordata
- Class: Actinopterygii
- Order: Siluriformes
- Family: Amphiliidae
- Genus: Amphilius
- Species: A. krefftii

Binomial name
- Amphilius krefftii Boulenger, 1911

Species of catfish

Amphilius krefftii is a species of catfish in the genus Amphilius. It is found in the Galana River basin in Kenya, and the Sigi River, Pangani River, and Lake Jipe basins in Tanzania. Its length reaches 20.8 cm.
