= Zaireichthys mandevillei =

Conservation status
- Data Deficient (IUCN 3.1)

Scientific classification
- Domain: Eukaryota
- Kingdom: Animalia
- Phylum: Chordata
- Class: Actinopterygii
- Order: Siluriformes
- Family: Amphiliidae
- Genus: Zaireichthys
- Species: Z. mandevillei

Binomial name
- Zaireichthys mandevillei (Poll, 1959)

Synonyms
- Leptoglanis mandevillei Poll, 1959

Species of fish

Zaireichthys mandevillei is a species of loach catfish found in the Central African Republic and the Democratic Republic of the Congo where it is found in the Congo River Basin. It grows to a length of 2.6 cm and has a broad, black collar just behind the head and a spotted colour pattern. The barbels are attenuate, with the maxillary barbels extending posteriorly to middle to end of the pectoral fin spine and the caudal peduncle is slender. The humeral process of the pectoral girdle is short and without denticulations. The caudal fin is deeply forked, with the upper lobe much shorter and smaller than the lower lobe; also, the fin rays in lower lobe noticeable thicker than those in upper lobe.
