= Amphilius pedunculus =

Scientific classification
- Kingdom: Animalia
- Phylum: Chordata
- Class: Actinopterygii
- Order: Siluriformes
- Family: Amphiliidae
- Genus: Amphilius
- Species: A. pedunculus

Binomial name
- Amphilius pedunculus Thomson, Page, & Hilber, 2015

Species of fish

Amphilius pedunculus is a species of fish in the family Amphiliidae, first found in the Malagarasi River drainage, as well as Lake Rukwa and Rufiji River basins, and upper Great Ruaha River drainage.
