= Amphilius korupi =

Conservation status
- Endangered (IUCN 3.1)

Scientific classification
- Kingdom: Animalia
- Phylum: Chordata
- Class: Actinopterygii
- Order: Siluriformes
- Family: Amphiliidae
- Genus: Amphilius
- Species: A. korupi

Binomial name
- Amphilius korupi Skelton, 2007

Species of catfish

Amphilius korupi is a species of catfish in the genus Amphilius. It is found in coastal streams in northwestern Cameroon. Its length reaches 6.5 cm.
