= Psammphiletria nasuta =

Conservation status
- Data Deficient (IUCN 3.1)

Scientific classification
- Domain: Eukaryota
- Kingdom: Animalia
- Phylum: Chordata
- Class: Actinopterygii
- Order: Siluriformes
- Family: Amphiliidae
- Genus: Psammphiletria
- Species: P. nasuta

Binomial name
- Psammphiletria nasuta T. R. Roberts, 2003

Species of fish

Psammphiletria nasuta is a species of loach catfish endemic to the Central African Republic where it is found in the Ubangui River. It grows to a length of 2.3 cm.
