= Amphilius crassus =

Scientific classification
- Kingdom: Animalia
- Phylum: Chordata
- Class: Actinopterygii
- Order: Siluriformes
- Family: Amphiliidae
- Genus: Amphilius
- Species: A. crassus

Binomial name
- Amphilius crassus Thomson, Page & Hilber, 2015

Species of fish

Amphilius crassus is a species of fish in the family Amphiliidae, first found in the Rufiji and Wami basin of eastern Tanzania.
