= Amphilius opisthophthalmus =

Conservation status
- Data Deficient (IUCN 3.1)

Scientific classification
- Kingdom: Animalia
- Phylum: Chordata
- Class: Actinopterygii
- Order: Siluriformes
- Family: Amphiliidae
- Genus: Amphilius
- Species: A. opisthophthalmus

Binomial name
- Amphilius opisthophthalmus Boulenger, 1919

Species of catfish

Amphilius opisthophthalmus is a species of catfish in the genus Amphilius. It is found in Oshwe on the Lukenie River in the Democratic Republic of the Congo. Its length reaches 8.4 cm (3.3 in).
