= Zaireichthys rotundiceps =

Conservation status
- Data Deficient (IUCN 3.1)

Scientific classification
- Domain: Eukaryota
- Kingdom: Animalia
- Phylum: Chordata
- Class: Actinopterygii
- Order: Siluriformes
- Family: Amphiliidae
- Genus: Zaireichthys
- Species: Z. rotundiceps

Binomial name
- Zaireichthys rotundiceps (Hilgendorf, 1905)

Synonyms
- Gephyroglanis rotundiceps Hilgendorf, 1905; Leptoglanis rotundiceps (Hilgendorf, 1905)

Species of fish

Zaireichthys rotundiceps, the Spotted sand catlet, is a species of loach catfish that occurs in the countries of Botswana, Kenya, Malawi, Mozambique, Namibia, Tanzania, Zambia and Zimbabwe with uncertain records from Burundi and the Democratic Republic of the Congo. This species may actually consist of several species. It reaches a length of 3.8 cm. The colouration of Z. rotundiceps is highly variable, from abundant dark spots in several rows to a light pale spotting pattern; marks are often present on the head and fins as well as the body. The humeral process of the pectoral girdle is moderately long with poorly developed or fine denticulations. The caudal fin shape is variable, from slightly forked through, emarginate, truncate, or even slightly rounded, but not deeply forked. The dorsal and pectoral fins have strong and stout spines. It inhabits fairly shallow water where it occur over sand, usually buried with just the eyes protruding. Its eggs are few (12–16) and large (3–5 millimetres diameter), which suggests that the parents may care for the eggs and young.
