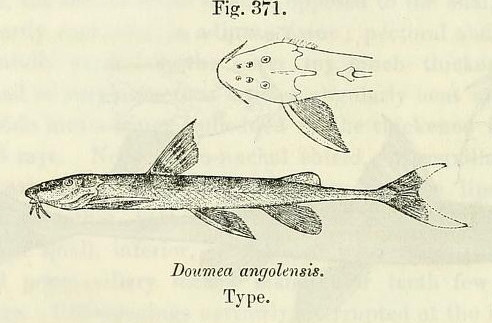

Conservation status
- Least Concern (IUCN 3.1)

Scientific classification
- Domain: Eukaryota
- Kingdom: Animalia
- Phylum: Chordata
- Class: Actinopterygii
- Order: Siluriformes
- Family: Amphiliidae
- Genus: Doumea
- Species: D. angolensis

Binomial name
- Doumea angolensis Boulenger, 1906

= Doumea angolensis =

Species of fish

Doumea angolensis is a species of loach catfish endemic to Angola where it is found in the Benguela interior and the Kwanza River system.

It reaches lengths of 7 cm.
