= Congoglanis alula =

Conservation status
- Least Concern (IUCN 3.1)

Scientific classification
- Kingdom: Animalia
- Phylum: Chordata
- Class: Actinopterygii
- Order: Siluriformes
- Family: Amphiliidae
- Genus: Congoglanis
- Species: C. alula

Binomial name
- Congoglanis alula (Nichols & Griscom, 1917)

Synonyms
- Doumea alula Nichols & Griscom, 1917

Species of fish

Congoglanis alula is a species of loach catfish found in the Congo River Basin in Angola, the Democratic Republic of Congo and possibly in Zambia.

== Length ==
It reaches lengths up to 14.1 centimetres (5.6 in) SL.

== Etymology ==
The fish's name is Latin for a winglet. This may refer to its flattened and expanded wing-like fins, an adaptation to the fast water in which it lives.
