= Amphilius atesuensis =

Conservation status
- Least Concern (IUCN 3.1)

Scientific classification
- Kingdom: Animalia
- Phylum: Chordata
- Class: Actinopterygii
- Order: Siluriformes
- Family: Amphiliidae
- Genus: Amphilius
- Species: A. atesuensis

Binomial name
- Amphilius atesuensis Boulenger, 1904

Species of catfish

Amphilius atesuensis is a species of catfish in the genus Amphilius. Its length reaches 9.3 cm. It lives from the Saint John River in Liberia to the Mono River in Togo.
