= Crazy, Not Insane =

2020 American documentary film

- Official poster
- Directed by: Alex Gibney
- Written by: Alex Gibney
- Produced by: Alex Gibney; Ophelia Harutyunyan; Erin Edeiken; Joey Marra
- Narrated by: Laura Dern
- Cinematography: Ben Bloodwell
- Edited by: Andy Grieve
- Music by: Will Bates
- Production companies: Jigsaw Productions; HBO Documentary Films
- Distributed by: HBO
- Release dates: March 18, 2020 (CPH:DOX); November 18, 2020 (United States)
- Running time: 117 minutes
- Country: United States
- Language: English

Crazy, Not Insane is a 2020 American documentary film directed and produced by Alex Gibney. It follows the research of psychiatrist Dorothy Otnow Lewis who studied the psychology of murderers. It is narrated by Laura Dern.

The film had its world premiere at Copenhagen International Documentary Festival (CPH:DOX) on March 18, 2020. It was released on November 18, 2020, by HBO.

== Synopsis ==
The film follows the research of psychiatrist Dr. Dorothy Otnow Lewis who studied the psychology of murders. Richard Burr, Catherine Yeager, Park Dietz and Bill Hagmaier also appear in the film.

== Production ==
Initially, Alex Gibney asked Dorothy Otnow Lewis if she would consult on a planned miniseries he was doing which was set to star Laura Dern as a psychiatrist who saw patients on death row, Lewis was delighted and agreed, and showed Gibney videotapes of her past cases, which Gibney found interesting. Initially the film was called Dorothy and Ted and was set to follow Lewis as she investigated serial killer Ted Bundy and reflected back on her interview with him in 1989, however, in the final cut Bundy appears in a smaller part.

== Release ==
The film was set to have its world premiere at South by Southwest in March 2020, however, the festival was cancelled due to the COVID-19 pandemic. The film instead had its world premiere at the CPH:DOX on March 18, 2020. The film screened at the Venice Film Festival on September 10, 2020. It is scheduled to be released on November 18, 2020.

== Reception ==
Crazy, Not Insane holds a 94% approval rating on review aggregator website Rotten Tomatoes, based on 32 reviews, with an average of 7.2/10. The site's critical consensus reads, "Crazy, Not Insane isn't as narratively disciplined as documentarian Alex Gibney's best work, but Dorothy Otnow Lewis' clinical analysis of murderous psychology may prompt unexpected sympathy for the devil." On Metacritic, the film holds a rating of 78 out of 100, based on 7 critics, indicating "generally favorable" reviews.
