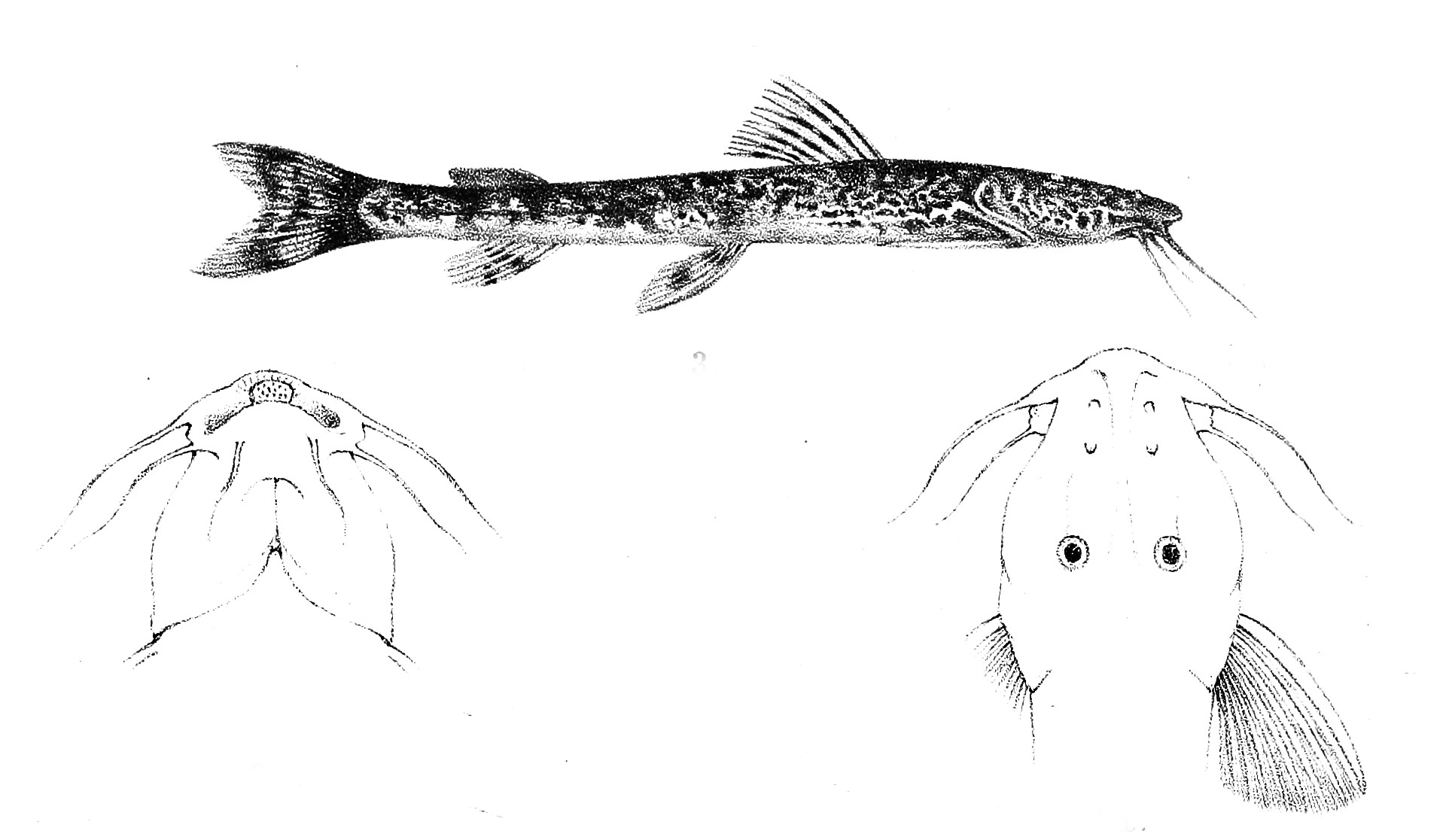
- Amphilius longirostris

Scientific classification
- Kingdom: Animalia
- Phylum: Chordata
- Class: Actinopterygii
- Order: Siluriformes
- Family: Amphiliidae
- Subfamily: Amphiliinae; Regan, 1911

Genera
- Amphilius; Paramphilius

= Amphiliinae =

Subfamily of fishes

Amphiliinae is one of three subfamilies of the loach catfish family Amphiliidae, it consists of two genera, Amphilius and Paramphilius and is endemic to the Afrotropics. There are currently 29 species classified as members of the Amphiliinae, some of which are traded as part of the aquarium trade. They are small catfish measuring between 95mm and 195mm.
