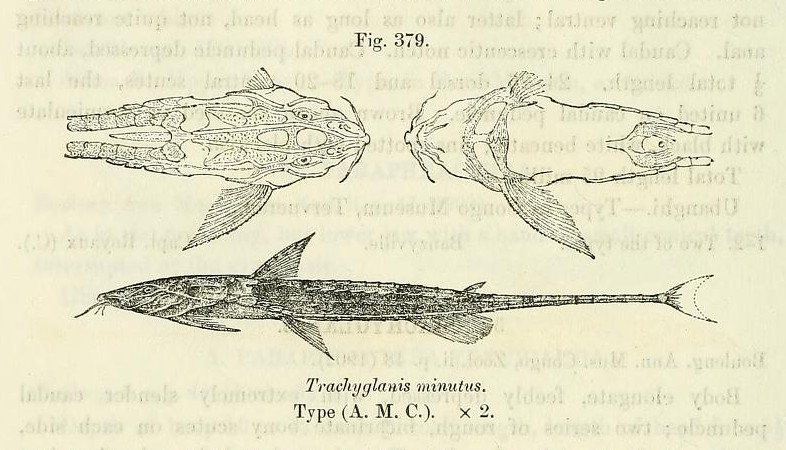
- Trachyglanis minutus

Scientific classification
- Domain: Eukaryota
- Kingdom: Animalia
- Phylum: Chordata
- Class: Actinopterygii
- Order: Siluriformes
- Family: Amphiliidae
- Subfamily: Doumeinae
- Genus: Trachyglanis; Boulenger, 1902

Type species
- Trachyglanis minutus Boulenger, 1902

Species
- see text

= Trachyglanis =

Genus of fishes

Trachyglanis is a genus of loach catfishes from Africa.

== Species ==
This genus currently includes four described species:

- Trachyglanis ineac (Poll, 1954)
- Trachyglanis intermedius Pellegrin, 1928
- Trachyglanis minutus Boulenger, 1902
- Trachyglanis sanghensis Pellegrin, 1925
