= Leptoglanis =

Scientific classification
- Domain: Eukaryota
- Kingdom: Animalia
- Phylum: Chordata
- Class: Actinopterygii
- Order: Siluriformes
- Family: Amphiliidae
- Subfamily: Leptoglanidinae
- Genus: Leptoglanis; Boulenger, 1902

Genus of fishes

Leptoglanis is a genus of loach catfishes found in Africa. There are currently two described species in this genus.

== Species ==
- Leptoglanis bouilloni Poll, 1959
- Leptoglanis xenognathus Boulenger, 1902
