= Zaireichthys camerunensis =

Conservation status
- Least Concern (IUCN 3.1)

Scientific classification
- Kingdom: Animalia
- Phylum: Chordata
- Class: Actinopterygii
- Order: Siluriformes
- Family: Amphiliidae
- Genus: Zaireichthys
- Species: Z. camerunensis

Binomial name
- Zaireichthys camerunensis (Daget & Stauch, 1963)

Synonyms
- Leptoglanis camerunensis Daget & Stauch, 1963

Species of fish

Zaireichthys camerunensis is a species of loach catfish found in Cameroon and Guinea in the Niger River basin. It reaches a length of 3.3 cm. The humeral process of the pectoral girdle is short and without denticulations. The neural and hemal spines tend to be simple and slender.
