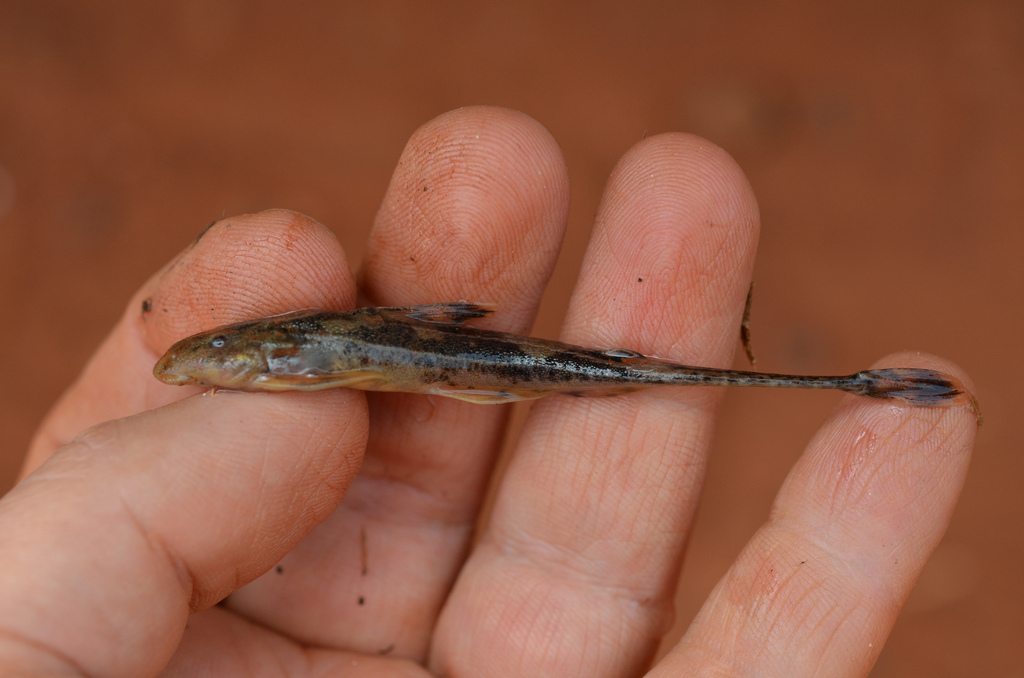
- Doumea typica

Scientific classification
- Kingdom: Animalia
- Phylum: Chordata
- Class: Actinopterygii
- Order: Siluriformes
- Family: Amphiliidae
- Subfamily: Doumeinae
- Genus: Doumea; Sauvage, 1879

Type species
- Doumea typica Sauvage, 1879

= Doumea =

Genus of fishes

Doumea is a genus of loach catfishes native to Africa.

Species of Doumea have a rather large and tapered body, a pointed head, and a thin caudal peduncle. Thin bilateral osseous peaks are sometimes present on the back and the belly, and are the precursors series of osseous plates observed in the other kinds of Doumeinae. By the shape of the body, these fish are adapted to rapids.

== Species ==
There are currently 9 recognized species in this genus:

- Doumea angolensis Boulenger, 1906
- Doumea chappuisi Pellegrin, 1933
- Doumea gracila P. H. Skelton, 2007
- Doumea reidi Ferraris, P. H. Skelton & Vari, 2010
- Doumea sanaga P. H. Skelton, 2007
- Doumea skeltoni Ferraris & Vari, 2014
- Doumea stilicauda Ferraris, P. H. Skelton & Vari, 2010
- Doumea thysi P. H. Skelton, 1989
- Doumea typica Sauvage, 1879
