= Psammphiletria =

Scientific classification
- Domain: Eukaryota
- Kingdom: Animalia
- Phylum: Chordata
- Class: Actinopterygii
- Order: Siluriformes
- Family: Amphiliidae
- Subfamily: Leptoglanidinae
- Genus: Psammphiletria; T. R. Roberts, 2003

Type species
- Psammphiletria nasuta Roberts, 2003

Genus of fishes

Psammphiletria is a genus of loach catfishes found in the Congo River Basin.

== Species ==
There are currently two described species in this genus:

- Psammphiletria delicata T. R. Roberts, 2003
- Psammphiletria nasuta T. R. Roberts, 2003
