= Paramphilius =

Scientific classification
- Kingdom: Animalia
- Phylum: Chordata
- Class: Actinopterygii
- Order: Siluriformes
- Family: Amphiliidae
- Subfamily: Amphiliinae
- Genus: Paramphilius; Pellegrin, 1907

Type species
- Paramphilius trichomycteroides Pellegrin, 1907

Genus of fishes

Paramphilius is a genus of loach catfishes found in Africa.

== Description ==
Paramphilius have a lengthened and cylindrical body with a short and high head and short and round fins. The small eyes are located far forward. The barbels are long. The caudal fin is truncated or round. All of the West African species are uniformly brown with a paler underside; P. firestonei also has irregularly distributed brown spots as well as a dark spot at the base of the caudal fin. Paramphilius species exhibit a peculiar form of sexual dimorphism in that the males mature have a more inflated head. Unlike species of Amphilius, the length of the snout is less than half of the length of the head, the adipose fin is confluent with the caudal fin, and the anal fin has seven or more branched rays.

== Species ==
There are currently five recognized species in this genus:

- Paramphilius baudoni (Pellegrin, 1928)
- Paramphilius firestonei L. P. Schultz, 1942
- Paramphilius goodi Harry, 1953
- Paramphilius teugelsi P. H. Skelton, 1989
- Paramphilius trichomycteroides Pellegrin, 1907
