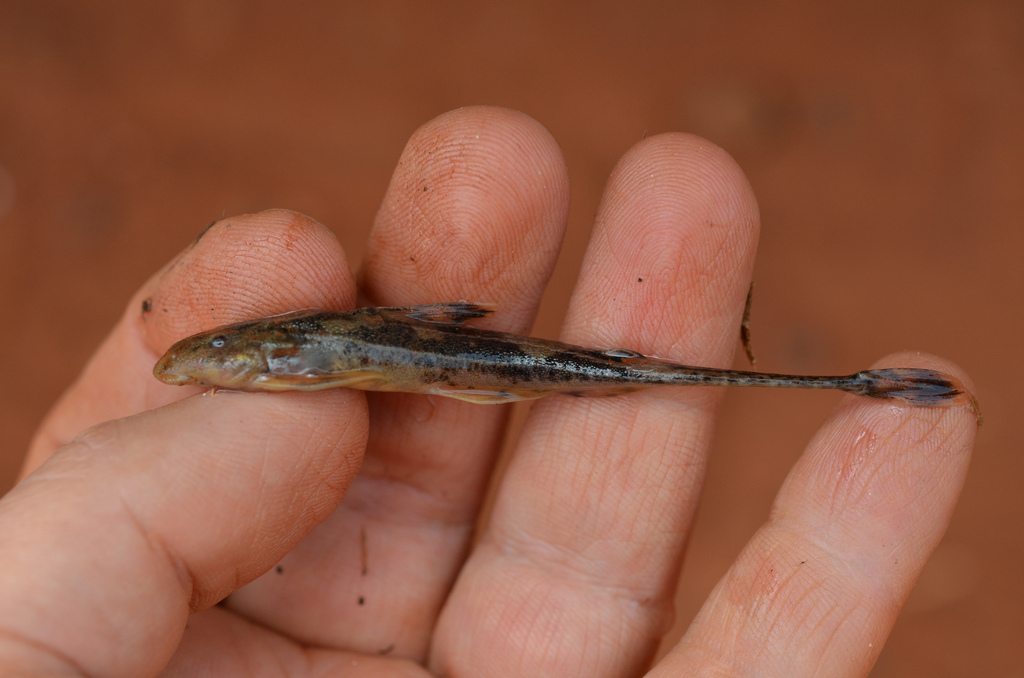

Conservation status
- Least Concern (IUCN 3.1)

Scientific classification
- Domain: Eukaryota
- Kingdom: Animalia
- Phylum: Chordata
- Class: Actinopterygii
- Order: Siluriformes
- Family: Amphiliidae
- Genus: Doumea
- Species: D. typica

Binomial name
- Doumea typica Sauvage, 1879

= Doumea typica =

Species of fish

Doumea typica is a species of loach catfish found in the Dja River and coastal rivers in Cameroon, the Republic of Congo and Gabon as well as possibly in the Democratic Republic of Congo. It reaches a length of 13.2 cm.
