= Tetracamphilius =

Scientific classification
- Kingdom: Animalia
- Phylum: Chordata
- Class: Actinopterygii
- Order: Siluriformes
- Family: Amphiliidae
- Subfamily: Leptoglanidinae
- Genus: Tetracamphilius; T. R. Roberts, 2005

Type species
- Tetracamphilius pectinatus Roberts, 2005

Genus of fishes

Tetracamphilius is a genus of catfishes (order Siluriformes) of the family Amphiliidae. It includes four species.

Tetracamphilius catfishes are small fishes with the largest species growing to 3.9 cm in length.

== Species ==
There are currently four recognized species in this genus:

- Tetracamphilius angustifrons (Boulenger, 1902)
- Tetracamphilius clandestinus T. R. Roberts, 2003
- Tetracamphilius notatus (Nichols & Griscom, 1917)
- Tetracamphilius pectinatus T. R. Roberts, 2003
