= Congoglanis =

Scientific classification
- Kingdom: Animalia
- Phylum: Chordata
- Class: Actinopterygii
- Order: Siluriformes
- Family: Amphiliidae
- Subfamily: Doumeinae
- Genus: Congoglanis; Ferraris, Vari & P. H. Skelton, 2011

Type species
- Doumea alula Nichols & Griscom, 1917

Genus of fishes

Congoglanis is a genus of loach catfishes found in the Congo River system of Africa. This genus is considered the sister group of all other species in the subfamily Doumeinae.

== Species ==
There are currently four recognized species in this genus:

- Congoglanis alula (Nichols & Griscom, 1917)
- Congoglanis howesi Vari, Ferraris & P. H. Skelton, 2012
- Congoglanis inga Ferraris, Vari & P. H. Skelton, 2011
- Congoglanis sagitta Ferraris, Vari & P. H. Skelton, 2011
