= Leptoglanidinae =

Scientific classification
- Kingdom: Animalia
- Phylum: Chordata
- Class: Actinopterygii
- Order: Siluriformes
- Family: Amphiliidae
- Subfamily: Leptoglanidinae; Roberts, 2003

Genera
- Dolichamphilius; Leptoglanis; Psammphiletria; Tetracamphilius; Zaireichthys

Subfamily of fishes

Leptoglanidinae is one of three subfamilies of the loach catfish family Amphiliidae, it consists of five genera which are endemic to the Afrotropics. The family contains a total of 28 currently recognised species. They are small catfish measuring between 20mm and 80mm.
