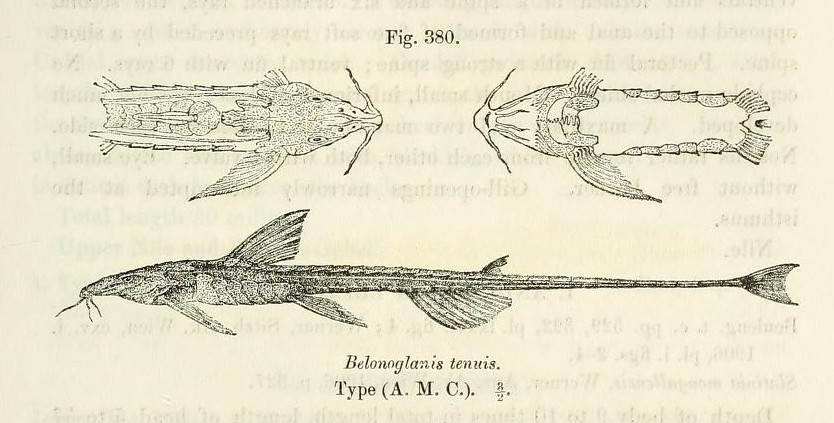
- Belonoglanis tenuis

Scientific classification
- Kingdom: Animalia
- Phylum: Chordata
- Class: Actinopterygii
- Order: Siluriformes
- Family: Amphiliidae
- Subfamily: Doumeinae
- Genus: Belonoglanis; Boulenger, 1902

Type species
- Belonoglanis tenuis Boulenger, 1902

= Belonoglanis =

Genus of fishes

Belonoglanis is a genus of catfishes (order Siluriformes) of the family Amphiliidae. Both species occur in the Congo River basin.

== Species ==
There are currently two recognized species in this genus:

- Belonoglanis brieni Poll, 1959
- Belonoglanis tenuis Boulenger, 1902
