= Dorothy Otnow Lewis =

American psychiatrist and author

Dorothy Otnow Lewis is an American psychiatrist and author who has been an expert witness at a number of high-profile cases.

She specializes in the study of violent individuals and people with dissociative identity disorder (DID), formerly known as multiple personality disorder. Lewis has worked with death row inmates as well as other prison inmates convicted for crimes of passion and violence, and was the director of the DID clinic at Bellevue Hospital, associated with New York University in New York City. She is a professor of psychiatry at Yale and New York University and is the author of Guilty by Reason of Insanity, a book she wrote based on research done in collaboration with neurologist Jonathan Pincus.

== Education and personal life ==
Lewis, born in 1938, is a graduate of the Ethical Culture Fieldston School, Radcliffe College and Yale University School of Medicine. This was an unusual achievement for a woman of her generation. She has stated in one of her books she originally went to medical school intending to become a psychoanalyst.

She was married to Melvin Lewis, a child psychiatrist and professor at Yale, who died in 2007. She has two children.

== Research ==
During her research Lewis concluded that most, if not all, of the inmates she worked with had been abused as children or had experienced or witnessed potentially traumatic events, including violence. She found that in most cases both the accused and the family members have been reluctant to discuss the abuse that happened in the past; in many cases she concluded that the inmates had blocked out the memories. In some cases she was able to find testimony to this abuse as well as corroborating evidence. The corroborating evidence often included scars said to be from the abuse, as well as hospital and criminal records potentially related to abuse. In many cases, the hospital records of the abuse were attributed to other causes, often accidents; the explanations often did not match the injuries according to Lewis, however. She also found that the parents of these children often had the same problems as the children and concluded that they taught their behavior to the children. She argued that they often relied on excessive force to discipline their children and used it inconsistently, and that in many cases the children who received the strictest discipline became the most violent. In some cases these children found that if they told other adults about the abuse, which in some cases was very extreme, they found that adults didn't believe them because the stories were too bizarre.

However, other experts, such as forensic psychologist Barbara R. Kirwin, question Lewis' uses of small samples without control groups, and her own findings indicate a far lower estimate of how many murderers were abused as children.

Lewis in fact focused on several possible antecedents of violence, and summed up her conclusions in 1998: "What brain damage does is it increases emotional lability, impulsiveness, poor judgment. But most brain-damaged people are not violent. And psychoses, even paranoia ... even paranoid schizophrenia does not usually create violence. Most people with this disorder are not violent. And probably abuse alone does not create a grotesquely violent individual. However, when you put these together brain dysfunction, a tendency to paranoia and early on-going horrendous abuse and violence, you get a recipe for violence." Lewis has also highlighted the role of extremes of mood such as major depression and mania or even hypomania (including swings between them as found in the bipolar spectrum, previously known as manic depressive psychosis), and dissociative identity states (formerly multiple personality disorder, that Lewis originally doubted the existence of).

== Trial work ==
Lewis has assessed and/or testified for the defense on several high-profile criminal cases, including Mark David Chapman, Joel Rifkin, David Wilson (Louisiana) and Marie Moore (New Jersey), Joseph Paul Franklin, Ted Bundy and Arthur Shawcross. She most recently testified as an expert witness for the defense in CO vs. Letecia Stauch for the disappearance and murder of Gannon Stauch in May 2023. Her testimony mainly benefitted the prosecution, however. The jury did not find her testimony to be credible and Stauch was found guilty on all four charges.

In the Shawcross case, Lewis was the subject of some controversy. The first defense psychiatrist had concluded there was no insanity defense feasible for Shawcross, but Lewis reported diagnoses of post-traumatic stress disorder, dissociative identity disorder, brain damage, and psychomotor epilepsy. However, the prosecution took her case apart and it appeared that she had obtained some of her interview material from Shawcross by hypnosis, conducted without proper procedures for protecting against leading questions and false memories. In turn Lewis criticized the defense team for failing to obtain further brain studies to verify diagnoses of epilepsy and brain damage. She questioned the ethics of a prominent neurologist who was sent a brain scan by the defense and who ended up using the brain scan to testify for the prosecution. While Lewis stated that her long-term colleague Pincus found evidence of a temporal lobe cyst, frontal lobe scarring and electroencephalogram spiking, other neurologists found no evidence of abnormal ECG readings or any witnessed seizure, and concluded his neurology was within normal limits. Over the course of the trial Lewis became the focus of some public ridicule for her rambling style, and afterwards some of the jurors said she had damaged the defense case. Lewis has proposed a conspiracy theory to explain why she may have been deliberately undermined, based on the prosecutor sharing the same rare name as a former CIA operative and the possibility that her questioning of Shawcross's army days might have risked revealing he had been put through MKUltra-type brainwashing experiments.

Lewis was also hired by the defense for the Washington Beltway Sniper John Allen Muhammad and assessed his mental state. Her report concluded that he had psychotic schizo-affective disorder and had brain dysfunction. Lewis, along with a New York Times journalist who reported an interview with her prior to Muhammad's capture, has been criticized by the head of the American Psychiatric Association and National Alliance on Mental Illness for having asserted that the man is "clearly psychotic" and probably manic. Lewis defended her media work and referred to another article that said she was one of the few to have gotten it right; however, for that Newsweek article she was quoted: "He may be talking nonsense, but that doesn't mean he's delusional."

== Views on justice and death penalty ==
Lewis is skeptical of the death penalty, but not necessarily the sentencing of inmates to life in order to protect the public. Neither Lewis nor Pincus believe the death penalty works as a deterrent. Lewis believes that the quest for justice often leads many prosecutors, judges, jurors to overlook things that could be considered mitigating circumstances. She believes that this leads to overlooking the root causes of crime and prevents long-term solutions that will help reduce child abuse and prevent more abused children from becoming killers.

== Play plagiarism accusation ==
In 2004 Lewis alleged that British playwright Bryony Lavery's hit Broadway play Frozen, particularly the character of 'Agnetha', a psychiatrist sent to evaluate a serial killer, was based on thematic similarities with her book Guilty by Reason of Insanity and verbatim extracts from a New Yorker article about her by Canadian journalist Malcolm Gladwell. Lewis hired a lawyer and began preparing for a lawsuit, including getting Gladwell to sign his copyright over to her for her case. The story was covered internationally in 2004 and Lavery states it has damaged her career. However, Gladwell himself has since said he was not comfortable signing over his copyright to Lewis (and did change his mind) and, while understanding that she was upset, suggests that the legal accusations were fueled by a lack of appreciation of the creative arts.

== Movie ==
In 2020 Lewis' work on the psychology of murders was portrayed in the documentary film Crazy, Not Insane by Alex Gibney.

== Books ==
- Delinquency and psychopathology (with David A. Balla), 1976
- Vulnerabilities to Delinquency, 1981
- Guilty by Reason of Insanity, 1998
