= Dolichamphilius =

Scientific classification
- Kingdom: Animalia
- Phylum: Chordata
- Class: Actinopterygii
- Order: Siluriformes
- Family: Amphiliidae
- Subfamily: Leptoglanidinae
- Genus: Dolichamphilius; T. R. Roberts, 2003

Type species
- Leptoglanis brieni Poll, 1959

Genus of fishes

Dolichamphilius is a genus of loach catfishes endemic to the Democratic Republic of the Congo. There are currently two recognized species in this genus.

== Species ==
- Dolichamphilius brieni (Poll, 1959)
- Dolichamphilius longiceps T. R. Roberts, 2003
