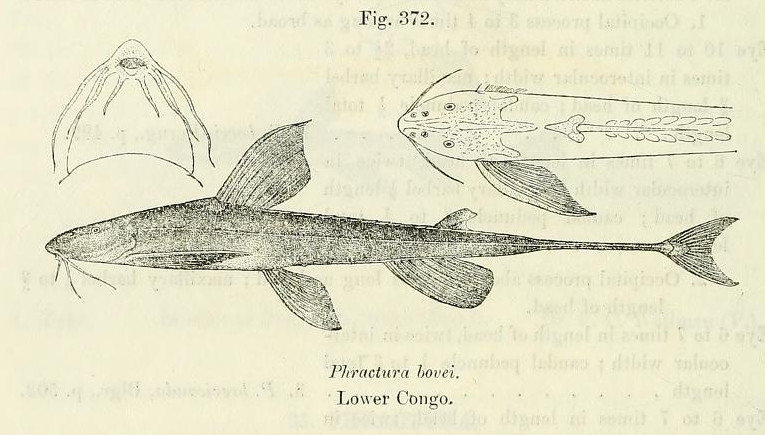
- Phractura bovei

Scientific classification
- Kingdom: Animalia
- Phylum: Chordata
- Class: Actinopterygii
- Order: Siluriformes
- Family: Amphiliidae
- Subfamily: Doumeinae
- Genus: Phractura; Boulenger, 1900

Type species
- Peltura bovei Perugia, 1892

Species
- See text.

Synonyms
- Peltura Perugia, 1892 (also used for a genus of trilobites); Paraphractura Boulenger, 1902

= Phractura =

Genus of fishes

Phractura is a genus of loach catfishes (order Siluriformes) that occur in Africa.

Phractura species are elongated fish with a long caudal peduncle and bony scutes on the sides, back, and belly., this feature giving the genus its name from the Greek phraktos, which means enclosed and oura which means tail. Phractura species are often associated with vegetation. The genus was originally given the name Peltura but this name was preoccupied by a genus of trilobites which the name Peltura had been applied to by Louis Agassiz in 1846. Phractura species, like other genera in Doumeinae, have a mouth modified into a suckermouth that allows it to clean to the objects and scrape the surface of the substrate.

== Species ==
There are currently 13 recognized species in this genus:

- Phractura ansorgii Boulenger, 1902 (African whiptailed catfish)
- Phractura bovei Perugia, 1892
- Phractura brevicauda Boulenger, 1911
- Phractura clauseni Daget & Stauch, 1963
- Phractura fasciata Boulenger, 1920
- Phractura gladysae Pellegrin, 1931
- Phractura intermedia Boulenger, 1911
- Phractura lindica Boulenger, 1902
- Phractura longicauda Boulenger, 1903
- Phractura macrura Poll, 1967
- Phractura scaphyrhynchura Vaillant, 1886
- Phractura stiassny Skelton, 2007
- Phractura tenuicauda Boulenger, 1902
