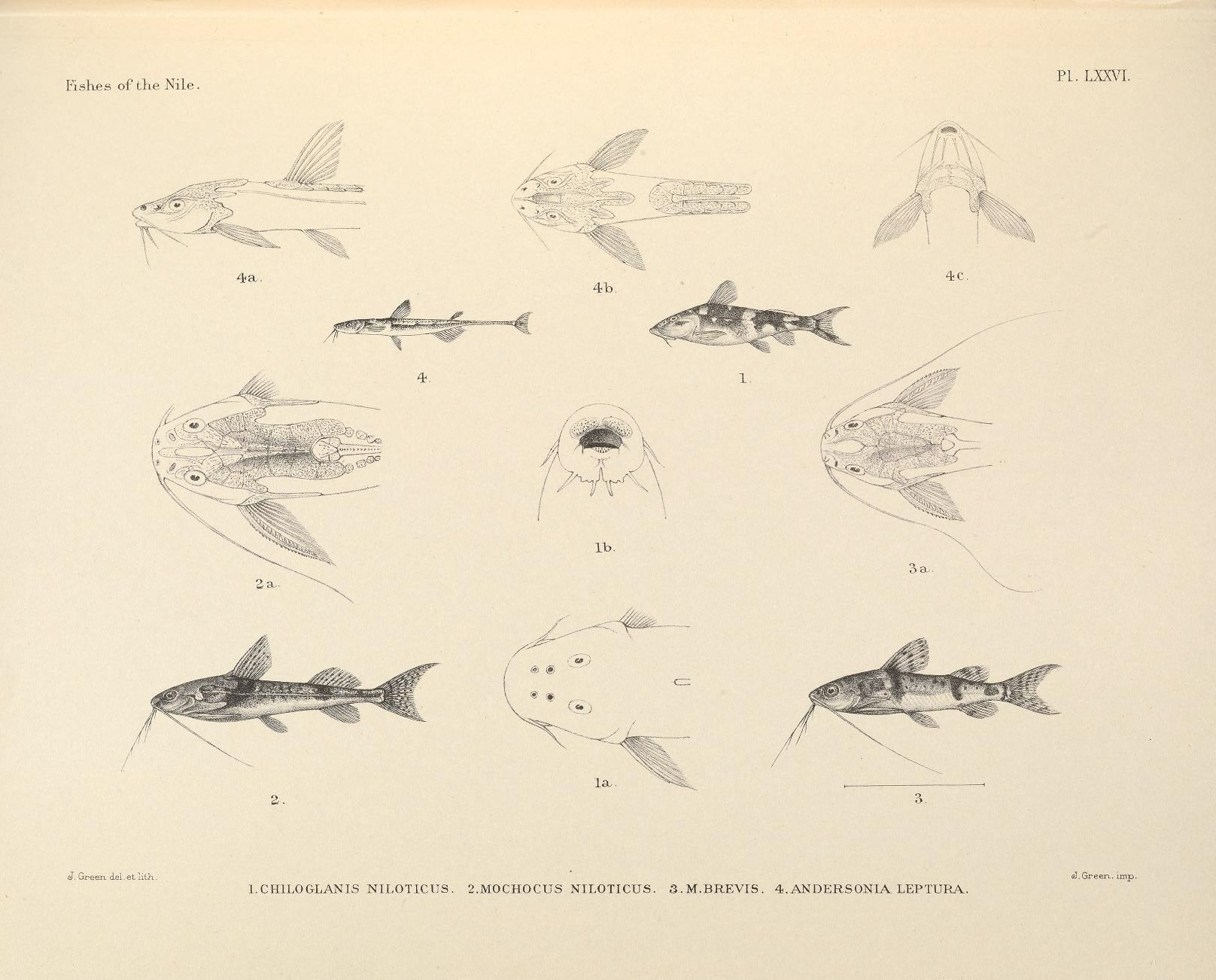
- Andersonia leptura (4)

Conservation status
- Least Concern (IUCN 3.1)

Scientific classification
- Kingdom: Animalia
- Phylum: Chordata
- Class: Actinopterygii
- Order: Siluriformes
- Family: Amphiliidae
- Subfamily: Doumeinae
- Genus: Andersonia; Boulenger, 1900
- Species: A. leptura

Binomial name
- Andersonia leptura Boulenger, 1900

Synonyms
- Slatinia mongallensis Werner, 1906; Andersonia brevior Boulenger, 1918; Andersonia pellegrini Boulenger, 1918

= Andersonia leptura =

Species of fish

Andersonia leptura is a species of catfish (order Siluriformes) of the family Amphiliidae, and is the only species of the genus Andersonia. This fish grows to about 50.0 cm (19.7 in) in total length; it is found in the Omo, Niger, and Upper Nile Rivers and the Lake Chad basin, and is also known from Lake Debo. Although previously considered to be toothless on the lower jaw, dentition has been found on the premaxilla and the dentary. The teeth are embedded in the mucous sheath that covers the head and extends into the oral cavity, which makes the teeth difficult to see with the naked eye.
