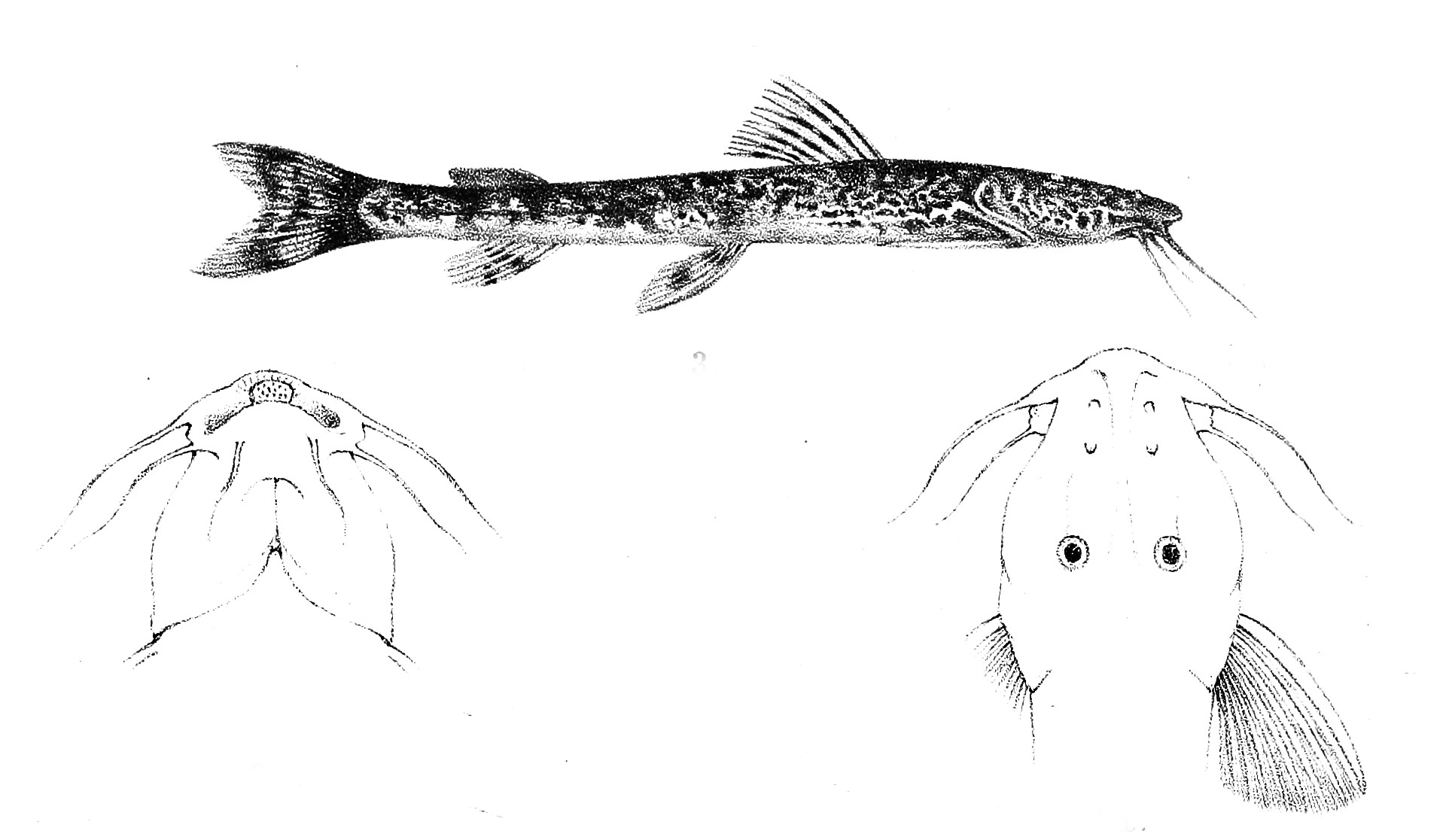
- Amphilius longirostris

Scientific classification
- Kingdom: Animalia
- Phylum: Chordata
- Class: Actinopterygii
- Division: Teleostei
- Order: Siluriformes
- Family: Amphiliidae
- Subfamily: Amphiliinae
- Genus: Amphilius; Günther, 1864

Type species
- Pimelodus platychir Günther, 1864

Synonyms
- Anoplopterus Pfeffer, 1889; Chimarrhoglanis Vaillant, 1897

= Amphilius =

Genus of fishes

Amphilius is a genus of catfishes of the family Amphiliidae.

Amphilius catfish have fairly lengthened bodies, with short, depressed, and broad heads. They have three pairs of fringed barbels. The eyes, small and located dorsally, are very distant from each other, and are without a free edge. The caudal fin is forked or emarginated. Unlike species of Paramphilius, the snout is greater than half of the snout length, the adipose fin is not confluent with the caudal fin in adult specimens, and the anal fin has seven or fewer branched rays.

== Species ==
There are currently 33 recognized species in this genus:

- Amphilius atesuensis Boulenger, 1904
- Amphilius athiensis A. W. Thomson & Page, 2010
- Amphilius brevis Boulenger, 1902
- Amphilius caudosignatus P. H. Skelton, 2007
- Amphilius chalei Seegers, 2008
- Amphilius crassus A. W. Thomson & Hilber, 2015
- Amphilius cryptobullatus P. H. Skelton, 1986
- Amphilius dimonikensis P. H. Skelton, 2007
- Amphilius frieli A. W. Thomson & Page, 2015
- Amphilius grandis Boulenger, 1905
- Amphilius jacksonii Boulenger, 1912 (Marbled mountain catfish)
- Amphilius kakrimensis Teugels, P. H. Skelton & Lévêque, 1987
- Amphilius kivuensis Pellegrin, 1933
- Amphilius korupi P. H. Skelton, 2007
- Amphilius krefftii Boulenger, 1911
- Amphilius lamani Lönnberg & Rendahl (de), 1920
- Amphilius lampei Pietschmann, 1913
- Amphilius laticaudatus P. H. Skelton, 1984 (Broadtail mountain catfish)
- Amphilius lentiginosus Trewavas, 1936
- Amphilius longirostris (Boulenger, 1901)
- Amphilius lujani A. W. Thomson & Page, 2015
- Amphilius maesii Boulenger, 1919
- Amphilius mamonekenensis P. H. Skelton, 2007
- Amphilius natalensis Boulenger, 1917 (Natal mountain catfish)
- Amphilius nigricaudatus Pellegrin, 1909
- Amphilius opisthophthalmus Boulenger, 1919
- Amphilius pedunculus A. W. Thomson & Page, 2015
- Amphilius platychir (Günther, 1864) (Mountain barbel)
- Amphilius pulcher Pellegrin, 1929
- Amphilius rheophilus Daget, 1959
- Amphilius ruziziensis A. W. Thomson & Page, 2015
- Amphilius uranoscopus (Pfeffer, 1889) (Stargazer mountain catfish)
- Amphilius zairensis P. H. Skelton, 1986
