= Carl Stough =

American choral conductor (1926–2000)

- Born: 1926
- Died: 2000 (aged 73-74)

Carl Stough (1926–2000) was an American choral conductor and breathing specialist and the founder of the now closed Carl Stough Institute of Breathing Coordination, a nonprofit organization for the research of optimal breathing.

== Biography ==
Carl Stough was a student of choral conducting at Westminster Choir College in New Jersey in the 1940s when he started to be fascinated with breathing. As a singer, he knew how important small and steady airflow was to the production of voice. He investigated the meaning of "breath support" that all singers are confronted with. He was trying to understand how to obtain optimal breath support for himself and the singers he was conducting in his choirs.

Through his observations and research, he was able to refine the understanding of how the breathing mechanism can work optimally. He applied this knowledge to professional and amateur singers and speakers, patients with lung diseases (especially emphysema) and other pathologies, dancers, actors and athletes. He worked with adults as well as children and the results he achieved helped to raise awareness of the breathing mechanism and how to overcome respiratory faults.

Stough founded the Carl Stough Institute of Breathing Coordination with his wife, Reece Stough, in 1965. The Institute closed after Stough's death in October 2000.

== Choral conductor ==
After graduating from Westminster Choir College, Stough was immediately hired to conduct the choir of First Presbyterian Church in Rocky Mount, North Carolina. The choir quickly became very successful, performing with the North Carolina Symphony and on radio. Stough stated that the reason for the critically acclaimed sound was weekly singing lessons that each singer of the choir had with him. In 1953, Stough returned to New York City to continue his own vocal studies and to work with other groups of singers. He was soon invited to reestablish the Evangelical Lutheran Church of the Good Shepherd Choir School in Bay Ridge, Brooklyn. By 1958, it was recognized for its excellence and became an institution firmly established in the musical life of New York City with its eight choirs ranging from age 3 to 93.

From 1958 to 1968, he worked with singers of the Metropolitan Opera. Stough worked with choirs and singers of all ages and musical styles, connecting them to their optimal breathing. To him, the most important part of the breathing mechanism was the exhale, and prolonging it by strengthening the diaphragm.

== Work with emphysema patients ==
As a breathing specialist, Stough worked in several hospitals from 1958 to 1962 assisting emphysema patients. The veterans' hospital in East Orange, New Jersey, was the first. At the time, the respiratory muscles and the mechanics of breathing were called a "no man's land between anatomy and physiology". By comparing the breathing patterns of the patients with his infant daughter's, Stough realized that instead of calmly letting the air come into the lungs from the diaphragm, the patients were gasping for air using accessory muscles that are not efficient for breathing. He then sought to release tensions in those muscles and the whole rib cage by light manual pressure and gentle tapping. Soon, the first positive results could be observed, as the amount of oxygen needed to be given to the patients dropped after the sessions with Stough.

Stough went on to work with emphysema patients at the Philadelphia Naval Hospital and, when the doctors he was associated with were moved, he followed them to the largest military hospital on the East coast, St. Alban's in New York City. There, the medical staff felt that Stough must have been changing the diaphragm and this led to the first images of a moving diaphragm with a then relatively new technology called fluoroscopy. Those films showed that it was possible to redevelop the movement of the diaphragm inside the rib cage, increasing the amount of used air being exhaled, and creating more space for fresh oxygen to be absorbed by the lungs. Stough also worked at the Veteran's Administration Medical Center in West Haven, Connecticut, which was the largest hospital for patients with respiratory diseases on the East Coast at the time. There he met Dr. Robert Nimbs, then the chief of pulmonary medicine, who later said about Stough:

The standard teaching was that air trapped in the emphysematous lung was trapped and could not be exhaled. For this reason the diaphragm was pushed down to a flat position and the ribs were elevated. Now I told Carl in no uncertain words that he was mildly demented to say that he could effect a rise in the diaphragm and a descent in the ribs, but then in one patient we got rather spectacular results showing that he did do this. Now what this means is that when Carl affects the coordination of all the groups of breathing muscles and the individual breathing muscles including the diaphragm and the abdomen and those around the neck and the throat, (that's) why the air can flow out of these areas which remain obstructed under every other circumstance and we have shown that he's able to decrease the volume of the lungs more than any pulmonary man would say it was possible. The function of the diaphragm redeveloped and he- Carl- refers to this quite correctly as re-development or development of the diaphragm. Now many studies that have been done in the last 5 years have been done at the wrong end of the spectrum. They studied how forcibly the diaphragm can pull down in an respiration. That's not the important thing. The important thing is what Carl has shown, that the diaphragm can be gotten to relax and go up, to rise so that during respiration it can come down. It's got plenty of strength, so there's no need to measure the strength.

Stough went on to participate in a medically supervised study, where he was working with one group of patients while the other group was being treated with intermittent pressure machines. Both Stough and the doctors were skeptical about the results. Stough felt all pressure applied to the breathing mechanism with machines would destroy the re-coordination work he had done, and the doctors were eager to prove the success of the machines because at that point, they had no other promising cure for emphysema. After six months, the study was discontinued. Several of the patients being treated with the machines had died and several of Stough's patients had left the hospital.

== Work with athletes ==
While working with terminally ill patients Stough realized the potential of his work for people with no respiratory faults. In 1967, he received a call from the U.S. Olympic Committee. The Olympic Games of 1968 were to be held in Mexico City, situated at high altitude. This posed a considerable problem as athletes prepared for the Olympics. Many of them had never performed at high altitude before, causing the committee to be concerned about oxygen insufficiency. After preliminary studies on the East Coast, Stough was approved by the medical board of the Olympic Committee to work as a breathing consultant for the U.S. Olympic track and field team at their training center in Lake Tahoe, California.

The Nevada State Journal wrote: "Dramatic Breathing Results Noted…" and Payton Jordan, head coach of the US Olympic track and field team stated: "It was under the expert tutorage of Carl Stough that our athletes learned to develop their breathing coordination. They quickly found that they could release tensions, handle greater work loads and have better recovery.". During one of the training sessions, Lee Evans, one of the athletes working with Stough, set a new world record over 400 meters.

The US track and field team had great success at the Mexico Olympics, winning more medals than ever before in its history and by far surpassing all other teams. Lee Evans, who won a gold medal at the Games, says of his work with Stough:

Through my work with Doctor Stough, I knew I had to exhale, you know, I exhaled which kept my energy up – I didn't get tired – ... when you finish the 400 meter race, your body is screaming for air. But, if you don't exhale, you're putting bad air on top of bad air. So the exhale is I think what saved me also after the Games. This was for my life, not just to help me break the world record. I will use this technique for the rest of my life.

== Private practice ==
In his private practice in New York City, Stough was able to help people from different backgrounds. Several books about other techniques such as the Alexander technique, craniosacral therapy, and Hellerwork use his work as a reference for breathing.

== Legacy ==
Carl Stough's approach to human breathing coordination was largely led by his instincts and personal perception of the sound of a person's voice. Even though Stough did not train practitioners in his method, a few of his disciples have incorporated his work into their practices and continue to do so Several other publications include Carl Stough's legacy. Lynn Martin has worked for 25 years as an assistant to Carl Stough and taught functional anatomy and breathing coordination. She worked with Robin de Haas to formalize the intuitions of Carl and Reece Stough.
