= Zaireichthys =

Scientific classification
- Kingdom: Animalia
- Phylum: Chordata
- Class: Actinopterygii
- Order: Siluriformes
- Family: Amphiliidae
- Subfamily: Leptoglanidinae
- Genus: Zaireichthys; T. R. Roberts, 1967

Type species
- Zaireichthys zonatus Roberts, 1967

Genus of fishes

Zaireichthys is a genus of loach catfishes (order Siluriformes) of the family Amphiliidae.

== Distribution ==
Zaireichthys species are found in Africa.

== Description ==
Zaireichthys species are quite small ranging from 2.1 cm (P. lacustris) to 3.9 cm (P. flavomaculatus) in length.

== Species ==
There are currently 18 described species in this genus:

- Zaireichthys brevis (Boulenger, 1915)
- Zaireichthys camerunensis (Daget & Stauch, 1963)
- Zaireichthys compactus Seegers, 2008
- Zaireichthys conspicuus Eccles, Tweddle & P. H. Skelton, 2011
- Zaireichthys dorae (Poll, 1967) (Chobe sand catlet)
- Zaireichthys flavomaculatus (Pellegrin, 1926)
- Zaireichthys heterurus T. R. Roberts, 2003
- Zaireichthys kafuensis Eccles, Tweddle & P. H. Skelton, 2011
- Zaireichthys kavangoensis Eccles, Tweddle & P. H. Skelton, 2011
- Zaireichthys kunenensis Eccles, Tweddle & P. H. Skelton, 2011
- Zaireichthys lacustris Eccles, Tweddle & P. H. Skelton, 2011
- Zaireichthys mandevillei (Poll, 1959)
- Zaireichthys maravensis Eccles, Tweddle & P. H. Skelton, 2011
- Zaireichthys monomotapa Eccles, Tweddle & P. H. Skelton, 2011
- Zaireichthys pallidus Eccles, Tweddle & P. H. Skelton, 2011
- Zaireichthys rotundiceps (Hilgendorf, 1905) (Spotted sand catlet)
- Zaireichthys wamiensis (Seegers, 1989)
- Zaireichthys zonatus T. R. Roberts, 1967
