= Disappearance and murder of Gannon Stauch =

2020 child murder in Colorado, U.S.

Gannon Stauch
- Gannon Stauch in 2019
- Born: Gannon Jacob Stauch; September 29, 2008; Horry County, South Carolina, U.S.
- Died: January 27, 2020 (aged 11); Colorado Springs, Colorado, U.S.
- Cause of death: Homicide by gun shot wound, blunt force trauma and sharp force injuries
- Known for: Victim of child murder
- Parents: Landen Bullard (mother); Albert Stauch (father)

Letecia Stauch
- Born: August 4, 1984 (age 42)
- Occupation: Former teacher
- Known for: Murderer of Gannon Stauch
- Spouse: Albert Stauch (m. 2015; div. 2020)
- Children: 1 biological child; 2 stepchildren (including Gannon)

Gannon Stauch (September 29, 2008 – January 27, 2020) was an American boy who was murdered by his stepmother, Letecia Hardin (then Stauch), in Colorado Springs, Colorado. His disappearance and death received national attention and sparked a massive search effort involving multiple law enforcement agencies and volunteers. His stepmother was arrested and convicted of first-degree murder and other charges, and sentenced to life in prison without parole. Hardin's conviction was overturned on April 2, 2026, with the Colorado Court of Appeals finding that one of the jurors was biased due to being within three degrees of separation from the state's attorneys.

== Disappearance and search ==
Gannon was reported missing by his stepmother on January 27, 2020. She told the El Paso County Sheriff's Office that he left home between 3:15 p.m. and 4 p.m. to walk to a friend's house, but never returned. The initial press release on his disappearance described him as a "juvenile runaway." However, three days later, the sheriff's office reclassified his case as a missing or endangered person, citing new information and evidence.

The search involved thousands of hours of investigation and hundreds of tips from the public. The FBI Child Abduction Rapid Deployment team, the National Center for Missing & Exploited Children, and the Colorado Springs Police Department assisted the sheriff's office in the case. Search teams used drones, dogs, horses, helicopters, and divers to comb through various areas of interest. Gannon's biological parents made emotional pleas for his safe return and thanked the community for their support.

== Arrest and conviction of Letecia Stauch ==
On March 2, 2020, Letecia Stauch was arrested in Myrtle Beach, South Carolina, on charges of first-degree murder of a child by a person in a position of trust, child abuse resulting in death, tampering with a deceased human body, and tampering with physical evidence. She was extradited to Colorado and held without bond at the El Paso County jail.

According to the arrest affidavit, which was released on May 5, 2020, Letecia Stauch killed Gannon in his bedroom on the day he went missing. She stabbed him 18 times, hit him in the head with an object, and shot him with a handgun. She then cleaned up the crime scene and disposed of his body in a suitcase. She also lied to investigators about her whereabouts and activities on that day and afterwards. She claimed that Gannon was sick and stayed home from school that day, and drove to various places with him throughout the day. Surveillance footage from a neighbor showed that she left home with Gannon in her truck around 10:15 a.m. and investigators believe she returned with him around 2:19 p.m.

On March 17, 2020, Gannon's remains were found by a maintenance worker under Escambia Bay Bridge in Pace, Florida, more than 1,300 miles (2,100 km) away from his home. The cause of death was determined to be blunt force trauma, sharp force injuries, and a gunshot wound. Investigators believe that Letecia Stauch transported his body to Florida by driving there in a rented van after initially dumping his body in a remote location north of Colorado Springs and retrieving it later.

Letecia Stauch pleaded not guilty by reason of insanity and claimed that she had dissociative identity disorder due to childhood sexual abuse.

She also accused her husband of being involved in Gannon's death and alleged that he had connections to drug cartels and sex trafficking rings. However, she was found competent to stand trial by a state mental hospital and her claims were dismissed by the court as unfounded.

Letecia's five week trial concluded on May 8, 2023, and the prosecution's case included testimonies from Gannon's father, Letecia's former employers, family, investigators, forensic experts, and state psychiatrists. The defense offered Dorothy Otnow Lewis, a controversial psychiatrist who specializes in dissociative identity disorder, as their single witness. The jury rejected the insanity defense and Otnow Lewis' testimony, and Letecia Stauch was found guilty of all charges. The same day, she was sentenced to life in prison without parole plus 156 years by Judge Gregory Werner, who called her actions "the most horrific I have ever seen" and said that she deserved "the maximum sentence that I can impose according to Colorado law".

Hardin's conviction was overturned on April 2, 2026, when the Colorado Court of Appeals determined that one of the jurors was impliedly biased, per state law, due to being within three degrees of separation from the state's attorneys.
