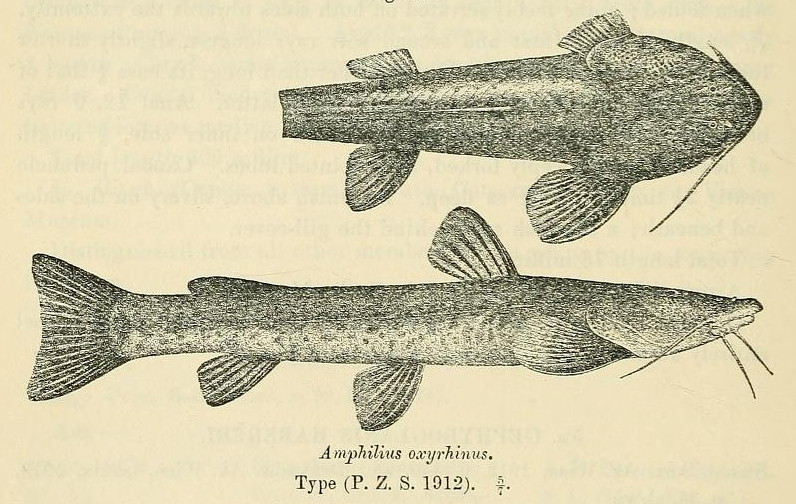
- Amphilius grandis

Scientific classification
- Kingdom: Animalia
- Phylum: Chordata
- Class: Actinopterygii
- Order: Siluriformes
- Suborder: Loricarioidei
- Family: Amphiliidae; Regan, 1911

Genera
- Subfamily Amphiliinae; Amphilius; Paramphilius; Subfamily Leptoglanidinae; Dolichamphilius; Leptoglanis; Psammphiletria; Tetracamphilius; Zaireichthys; Subfamily Doumeinae; Andersonia; Belonoglanis; Congoglanis; Doumea; Phractura; Trachyglanis

= Loach catfish =

Loach catfishes

Family of fishes

The loach catfishes are a family, Amphiliidae, of catfishes (order Siluriformes). They are widespread in tropical Africa, but are most common in streams at high elevations; most species are able to cling to rocks in fast-flowing streams. The 13 genera contain 68 species.

The family Amphiliidae has three subfamilies, Amphiliinae, Leptoglanidinae (previously misspelled Leptoglaninae), and Doumeinae. The monophyly of Amphiliidae has been questioned; one author restricts the family to the members of the subfamily Amphiliinae and transferred the other genera to a family Doumeidae. The Amphiliidae have been previously thought to be a basal taxon in the superfamily Loricarioidea, but some authors place their relationships elsewhere.

== Description ==
Amphiliids are generally small catfishes with tapering, elongated bodies. The pectoral and ventral fins are large, and the first ray of each is usually broad, flexible, and filamentous. The eyes are generally small and located in the upper part of the head. The gas bladder is reduced and divided into two lobes surrounded by bony capsules.

These catfishes have three pairs of barbels (nasal barbels are absent). The dorsal and pectoral spines are absent, or weakly developed (as in Leptoglanidinae and Trachyglanis). They reach 19 cm (7.5 in) at a maximum, but most species do not exceed 12 cm (4.7 in) in length. The small mouth is located on the underside of the head, and has thick lips bearing several soft lumps (papillae). The lips, together with tentacles, and with minute spines on the fin rays, enable the fish to grip solid surfaces, so they can hold on in fast-moving streams.

The biology and ecology of these fish are poorly known. They are of little economic value, though they may be of some interest to aquarists.
