= List of near threatened fishes =

- Extinct in the wild (EW): 11 species
- Critically endangered (CR): 906 species
- Endangered (EN): 1,533 species
- Vulnerable (VU): 1,740 species
- Near threatened (NT, LR/cd): 1,042 species
- Least concern (LC): 18,621 species
- Data deficient (DD): 5,492 species
Fish species (IUCN, 2025-2)
- 29,447 extant species have been evaluated
- 23,955 of those are fully assessed (Note: excludes data deficient evaluations.)
- 19,663 are not threatened at present
- 4,292 to 9,784 are threatened (Note: Threatened comprises CR, EN and VU. Upper estimate additionally includes DD.)
- 113 to 268 are extinct or extinct in the wild:
  - 102 extinct (EX) species (Note: Chart omits extinct (EX) species)
  - 11 extinct in the wild (EW)
  - 147 possibly extinct [CR(PE)]
  - 8 possibly extinct in the wild [CR(PEW)]

Near threatened (NT) species do not currently qualify for critically endangered (CR), endangered (EN) or vulnerable (VU) statuses, but are likely to qualify for a threatened category in the near future, or are already close to qualifying.

In September 2016, the International Union for Conservation of Nature (IUCN) listed 548 near threatened fish species. Of all evaluated fish species, 3.6% are listed as near threatened. The IUCN also lists seven fish subspecies as near threatened.

Of the subpopulations of fish evaluated by the IUCN, ten species subpopulations have been assessed as near threatened.

This is a complete list of near threatened fish species and subspecies evaluated by the IUCN. Species and subspecies which have near threatened subpopulations (or stocks) are indicated.

== Cartilaginous fish ==
Chondrichthyes includes sharks, rays, skates, and sawfish. There are 118 species and eight subpopulations of cartilaginous fish assessed as near threatened.

=== Rays and skates ===
- Spotted eagle ray (Aetobatus narinari)
- Spotted legskate (Anacanthobatis marmoratus)
- Kerguelen sandpaper skate (Bathyraja irrasa)
- Mccain's skate (Bathyraja maccaini)
- Cuphead skate (Bathyraja scaphiops)
- Spinytail skate (Bathyraja spinicauda)
- Red stingray (Dasyatis akajei)
- Blackspot skate (Dipturus campbelli)
- White-spotted skate (Dipturus cerva)
- Endeavour skate (Dipturus endeavouri)
- Bight skate (Dipturus gudgeri)
- Longsnout butterfly ray (Gymnura crebripunctata)
- Smooth butterfly ray (Gymnura micrura)
- Dwarf whipray (Himantura walga)
- Malacoraja clavata
- Spinetail mobula (Mobula japanica)
- Purple eagle ray (Myliobatis hamlyni)
- Longnose eagle ray (Myliobatis longirostris)
- Brazilian electric ray (Narcine brasiliensis)
- Narcine leoparda
- Vermiculate electric ray (Narcine vermiculatus)
- Plain maskray (Neotrygon annotata)
- Porcupine river stingray (Potamotrygon histrix)
- Magdalena freshwater stingray (Potamotrygon magdalenae)
- Potamotrygon marinae
- Raspy river stingray (Potamotrygon scobina)
- Raja asterias
- Blonde skate (Raja brachyura)
- Venezuela skate (Raja cervigoni)
- Smalleyed ray (Raja microocellata)
- Biscuit skate (Raja straeleni)
- Freckled guitarfish (Rhinobatos lentiginosus)
- Whitenose guitarfish (Rhinobatos leucorhynchus)
- Southern guitarfish (Rhinobatos percellens)
- Shovelnose guitarfish (Rhinobatos productus)
- Salalah guitarfish (Rhinobatos salalah)
- Zanzibar guitarfish (Rhinobatos zanzibarensis)
- Golden cownose ray (Rhinoptera steindachneri)
- Patagonian skate (Rhinoraja macloviana)
- Multispine skate (Rhinoraja multispinis)
- Murray's skate (Rhinoraja murrayi)
- Smallnose fanskate (Sympterygia bonapartii)
- Shorttail fanskate (Sympterygia brevicaudata)
- Round fantail stingray (Taeniurops grabata)
- Sepia stingray (Urolophus aurantiacus)
- Kapala stingaree (Urolophus kapalensis)
- Spiny-tail round ray (Urotrygon aspidura)
- Thorny round ray (Urotrygon chilensis)
- Munda round ray (Urotrygon munda)
- Dwarf round stingray (Urotrygon nana)
- Roger's round ray (Urotrygon rogersi)

=== Ground sharks ===
There are 35 species and one subpopulation of ground shark assessed as near threatened.

==== Requiem sharks ====
Species

- Bignose shark (Carcharhinus altimus)
- Hardnose shark (Carcharhinus macloti)
- Spot-tail shark (Carcharhinus sorrah)
- Tiger shark (Galeocerdo cuvier)
- Blue shark (Prionace glauca)
- Spadenose shark (Scoliodon laticaudus)

Subpopulations

- Pigeye shark (Carcharhinus amboinensis) (1 subpopulation)

==== Houndsharks ====
- Dusky smooth-hound (Mustelus canis)
- Arabian smooth-hound (Mustelus mosis)
- Narrowfin smooth-hound (Mustelus norrisi)

==== Catsharks ====
- Coral catshark (Atelomycterus marmoratus)
- Bristly catshark (Bythaelurus hispidus)
- Blotchy swellshark (Cephaloscyllium umbratile)
- Saddled swellshark (Cephaloscyllium variegatum)
- Atlantic sawtail catshark (Galeus atlanticus)
- Yellowspotted catshark (Scyliorhinus capensis)

=== Carpet sharks ===
Species

- Arabian carpetshark (Chiloscyllium arabicum)
- Whitespotted bamboo shark (Chiloscyllium plagiosum)
- Brownbanded bamboo shark (Chiloscyllium punctatum)
- Indonesian speckled carpetshark (Hemiscyllium freycineti)

Subpopulations

- Nurse shark (Ginglymostoma cirratum) (1 subpopulation)
- Epaulette shark (Hemiscyllium ocellatum) (1 subpopulation)

=== Squaliformes ===
Species

- Hooktooth dogfish (Aculeola nigra)
- Highfin dogfish (Centroscyllium excelsum)
- Portuguese dogfish (Centroscymnus coelolepis)
- Birdbeak dogfish (Deania calcea)
- Arrowhead dogfish (Deania profundorum)
- Prickly dogfish (Oxynotus bruniensis)
- Pacific sleeper shark (Somniosus pacificus)
- Edmund's spurdog (Squalus edmundsi)
- Eastern longnose spurdog (Squalus grahami)
- Western longnose spurdog (Squalus nasutus)
- Cyrano spurdog (Squalus rancureli)

Subpopulations

- Smallfin gulper shark (Centrophorus moluccensis) (1 subpopulation)
- Kitefin shark (Dalatias licha) (1 subpopulation)

=== Other cartilaginous fish ===
Species

- Sharpnose sevengill shark (Heptranchias perlo)
- Bluntnose sixgill shark (Hexanchus griseus)
- Bigeyed sixgill shark (Hexanchus nakamurai)
- Hydrolagus mitsukurii
- Ogilby's ghostshark (Hydrolagus ogilbyi)
- Dwarf sicklefin chimaera (Neoharriotta carri)
- Sicklefin chimaera (Neoharriotta pinnata)

Subpopulations

- Sand tiger shark (Carcharias taurus) (1 subpopulation)
- Shortfin mako shark (Isurus oxyrinchus) (1 subpopulation)
- Broadnose sevengill shark (Notorynchus cepedianus) (1 subpopulation)

== Lampreys ==
- Klamath lamprey (Entosphenus similis)
- Drin brook lamprey (Eudontomyzon stankokaramani)
- European river lamprey (Lampetra fluviatilis)
- Caucasian brook lamprey (Lampetra ninae)
- European brook lamprey (Lampetra planeri)
- Lombardy brook lamprey (Lampetra zanandreai)

== Ray-finned fish ==
There are 425 species, seven subspecies, and one subpopulation of ray-finned fish assessed as near threatened.

=== Silversides ===
- Basilichthys australis
- Makira rainbowfish (Bedotia alveyi)
- Colpichthys regis
- Finke River hardyhead (Craterocephalus centralis)
- Drysdale hardyhead (Craterocephalus helenae)
- Gulf grunion (Leuresthes sardina)
- Mountain rainbowfish (Melanotaenia monticola)
- Odontesthes mauleanum

=== Toothcarps ===
Species

- Anablepsoides derhami
- Anablepsoides elongatus
- Anablepsoides intermittens
- Lake Tuz toothcarp (Aphanius anatoliae)
- Aphanius baeticus
- Conchos pupfish (Cyprinodon eximius)
- Epiplatys chaperi
- Blue killi (Fundulopanchax filamentosus)
- Blue lyretail (Fundulopanchax gardneri)
- Gulare (Fundulopanchax gularis)
- Fundulopanchax ndianus
- Fundulopanchax walkeri
- Stippled studfish (Fundulus bifax)
- Blotched gambusia (Gambusia senilis)
- Micropanchax ehrichi
- Nothobranchius ocellatus
- Andean killifish (Orestias empyraeus)
- Elongate toothcarp (Poeciliopsis elongata)
- San Jeronimo livebearer (Poeciliopsis fasciata)
- Lowland livebearer (Poeciliopsis latidens)
- Headwater killifish (Profundulus candalarius)
- Scriptaphyosemion liberiense
- Scriptaphyosemion roloffi

Subspecies

- Epiplatys chaperi sheljuzhkoi
- Epiplatys olbrechtsi olbrechtsi
- Nigerian killi (Fundulopanchax gardneri nigerianus)

=== Cypriniformes ===
Cypriniformes includes carps, minnows, loaches and relatives. There are 122 species and one subspecies in the order Cypriniformes assessed as near threatened.

==== Hillstream loaches ====
- Aborichthys kempi
- Gray's stone loach (Balitora brucei)
- Neonoemacheilus assamensis
- Lake Beyşehir loach (Oxynoemacheilus atili)
- Paphlagonian sportive loach (Oxynoemacheilus banarescui)
- Palestine loach (Oxynoemacheilus insignis)
- Physoschistura shanensis
- Schistura devdevi
- Schistura manipurensis
- Schistura personata
- Sewellia elongata

==== True loaches ====
- Acantopsis multistigmatus
- Cobitis takatsuensis
- Sabanejewia vallachica
- Barred loach (Syncrossus beauforti)
- Burmese peppered firetail botia (Syncrossus berdmorei)

==== Cyprinids ====
Species

- Jordan bream (Acanthobrama lissneri)
- Acrossocheilus rendahli
- Alburnus sp. 'Volvi'
- Van Shah kuli (Alburnus tarichi)
- Bangana elegans
- Barbus bigornei
- Shortfin barb (Barbus brevipinnis)
- Barbus deserti
- Barbus lufukiensis
- Barbus macrolepis
- Southern barbel (Barbus meridionalis)
- Barbus nasus
- Simav barbel (Barbus niluferensis)
- Barbus parawaldroni
- Waterberg shortfin barb (Barbus sp. 'Waterberg')
- Barbus sprechiensis (Barbus sperchiensis)
- Horse barbel (Barbus tyberinus)
- Barilius lairokensis
- Least rasbora (Boraras urophthalmoides)
- Aegean scraper (Capoeta bergamae)
- Grusinian scraper (Capoeta ekmekciae)
- Seyhan scraper (Capoeta turani)
- Jordan himri (Carasobarbus canis)
- Orontes himri (Carasobarbus chantrei)
- Chondrostoma vardarense
- Mud carp (Cirrhinus molitorella)
- Clypeobarbus pseudognathodon
- Bluestripe shiner (Cyprinella callitaenia)
- Altamaha shiner (Cyprinella xaenura)
- Cyprinus multitaeniata
- Panther danio (Danio aesculapii)
- Danio kyathit
- Blue moon danio (Devario xyrops)
- Manantial roundnose minnow (Dionda argentosa)
- Garra bicornuta
- Garra elongata
- Burmese garra (Garra gravelyi)
- Garra poecilura
- Garra propulvinus
- Garra rakhinica
- Mishmi garra (Garra rupecula)
- Garra spilota
- Garra vittatula
- Headwater chub (Gila nigra)
- Roundtail chub (Gila robusta)
- Damascus garra (Hemigrammocapoeta nana)
- Flame chub (Hemitremia flammea)
- Western silvery minnow (Hybognathus argyritis)
- Silver carp (Hypophthalmichthys molitrix)
- Nandi labeo (Labeo nandina)
- Pangusia labeo (Labeo pangusia)
- Largemouth yellowfish (Labeobarbus kimberleyensis)
- Anatolian ghizani (Ladigesocypris irideus)
- Leatherside chub (Lepidomeda copei)
- Leptocypris guineensis
- Warrior shiner (Lythrurus alegnotus)
- Long pectoral-fin minnow (Macrochirichthys macrochirus)
- Mekongina erythrospila
- Microphysogobio tungtingensis
- Neolissochilus blanci
- Katli (Neolissochilus hexagonolepis)
- Neolissochilus hexastichus
- Highscale shiner (Notropis hypsilepis)
- Ozark shiner (Notropis ozarcanus)
- Onychostoma gerlachi
- Osteobrama belangeri
- Oxygymnocypris stewartii
- Pelasgus marathonicus
- Pelasgus thesproticus
- Percocypris pingi
- Two spot barb (Pethia cumingii)
- Black ruby barb (Pethia nigrofasciata)
- Burmese bumblebee barb (Pethia tiantian)
- Phoxinellus zeregi
- Stedman barb (Poropuntius clavatus)
- Thinlip barb (Probarbus labeaminor)
- Slender redfin (Pseudobarbus tenuis)
- Bluehead shiner (Pteronotropis hubbsi)
- Orangetail shiner (Pteronotropis merlini)
- Cherry barb (Puntius titteya)
- Raiamas nigeriensis
- Pearly rasbora (Rasboroides vaterifloris)
- Relict dace (Relictus solitarius)
- Rovella (Rutilus rubilio)
- Sanagia velifera
- Scardinius acarnanicus
- Scardinius dergle
- Schizothorax macropogon
- Schizothorax wangchiachii
- Alvord chub (Siphateles alvordensis)
- Adana chub (Squalius adanaensis)
- Squalius illyricus
- Cilician pike chub (Squalius kottelati)
- Squalius sp. 'Aoos'
- Squalius zrmanjae
- Side-striped barb (Systomus pleurotaenia)
- Pánuco minnow (Tampichthys catostomops)
- Jungha mahseer (Tor progeneius)
- Tor mahseer (Tor tor)
- Incomati chiselmouth (Varicorhinus nelspruitensis)

Subspecies

- Ot baligi (Phoxinellus zeregi meandri)

==== Suckers ====
- Modoc sucker (Catostomus microps)
- Klamath largescale sucker (Catostomus snyderi)
- Blackfin sucker (Thoburnia atripinnis)
- Rustyside sucker (Thoburnia hamiltoni)

=== Catfish ===
- Gangetic ailia (Ailia coila)
- Gagora catfish (Arius gagora)
- Giant sea catfish (Arius gigas)
- Astroblepus fissidens
- Astroblepus mindoensis
- Astroblepus pholeter
- Astroblepus prenadillus
- Astroblepus theresiae
- Bagarius bagarius
- Crocodile catfish (Bagarius suchus)
- Bagarius yarrelli
- Callichthys oibaensis
- Cetopsis baudoensis
- Chaetostoma mollinasum
- Chiloglanis carnosus
- Chiloglanis normani
- Chiloglanis polypogon
- Valencienne's clarid (Clarias dussumieri)
- Clarias lamottei
- Broadhead catfish (Clarias macrocephalus)
- Panda (Corydoras panda)
- Dasyloricaria seminuda
- Dinotopterus cunningtoni
- Glyptothorax interspinalum
- Glyptothorax striatus
- Hypostomus bolivianus
- Imparfinis cochabambae
- Siamese glass catfish (Kryptopterus minor)
- Malapterurus barbatus
- Malapterurus occidentalis
- Malapterurus punctatus
- Malapterurus stiassnyae
- Malapterurus teugelsi
- Malapterurus thysi
- Mystus malabaricus
- Carolina madtom (Noturus furiosus)
- Piebald madtom (Noturus gladiator)
- Neosho madtom (Noturus placidus)
- Northern madtom (Noturus stigmosus)
- Ompok bimaculatus
- Ompok pabda
- Ompok pabo
- Blue-eyed plec (Panaque cochliodon)
- Paracetopsis esmeraldas
- Paramphilius trichomycteroides
- Pterocryptis verecunda
- Synodontis comoensis
- Synodontis koensis
- Synodontis levequei
- Synodontis melanopterus
- Synodontis tourei
- Lake Victoria squeaker (Synodontis victoriae)
- Trichomycterus ballesterosi
- Trichomycterus cachiraensis
- Trichomycterus laucaensis
- Trichomycterus maldonadoi
- Trichomycterus rivulatus
- Trichomycterus ruitoquensis
- Wallago attu

=== Perciformes ===
There are 140 species and one subspecies in the order Perciformes assessed as near threatened.

==== Cichlids ====
Species

- Altolamprologus calvus
- Cichlasoma microlepis
- Tanganyika clown (Eretmodus cyanostictus)
- Gobiocichla wonderi
- Haplochromis labiatus
- Haplochromis oregosoma
- Steindachner's cichlid (Herichthys steindachneri)
- Lepidiolamprologus attenuatus
- Pelvicachromis roloffi
- Sarotherodon occidentalis
- Steatocranus irvinei
- Teleogramma depressum
- Tilapia walteri
- Tylochromis regani

Subspecies

- Sarotherodon galilaeus multifasciatus

==== Percids ====
- Coppercheek darter (Etheostoma aquali)
- Chickasaw darter (Etheostoma cervus)
- Crown darter (Etheostoma corona)
- Arkansas darter (Etheostoma cragini)
- Greenthroat darter (Etheostoma lepidum)
- Smallscale darter (Etheostoma microlepidum)
- Lollipop darter (Etheostoma neopterum)
- Finescale saddled darter (Etheostoma osburni)
- Firebelly darter (Etheostoma pyrrhogaster)
- Yazoo darter (Etheostoma raneyi)
- Arrow darter (Etheostoma sagitta)
- Cumberland Plateau darter (Etheostoma spilotum)
- Tippecanoe darter (Etheostoma tippecanoe)
- Common percarina (Percarina demidoffii)
- Freckled darter (Percina lenticula)
- Muscadine darter (Percina smithvanizi)
- Olive darter (Percina squamata)
- Stargazing darter (Percina uranidea)

==== Epinephelids ====
- Yellowfin hind (Cephalopholis hemistiktos)
- Marbled grouper (Dermatolepis inermis)
- White grouper (Epinephelus aeneus)
- Brown-spotted rockcod (Epinephelus andersoni)
- Duskytail grouper (Epinephelus bleekeri)
- Orange-spotted grouper (Epinephelus coioides)
- Saddletail grouper (Epinephelus daemelii)
- Spinycheek grouper (Epinephelus diacanthus)
- Brown-marbled grouper (Epinephelus fuscoguttatus)
- Malabar grouper (Epinephelus malabaricus)
- Red grouper (Epinephelus morio)
- Smallscaled grouper (Epinephelus polylepis)
- Camouflage grouper (Epinephelus polyphekadion)
- Surge grouper (Epinephelus socialis)
- Hawaiian grouper (Hyporthodus quernus)
- Black grouper (Mycteroperca bonaci)
- Sawtail grouper (Mycteroperca prionura)
- Yellowfin grouper (Mycteroperca venenosa)
- Coral trout (Plectropomus leopardus)
- Highfin coral grouper (Plectropomus oligacanthus)
- Roving coralgrouper (Plectropomus pessuliferus)

==== Eleotrids ====
- Freshwater gudgeon (Eleotris aquadulcis)
- Eleotris pellegrini
- Redfin bully (Gobiomorphus huttoni)
- Slender gudgeon (Hypseleotris ejuncida)
- Barnett river gudgeon (Hypseleotris kimberleyensis)
- Prince Regent gudgeon (Hypseleotris regalis)
- Mitchell gudgeon (Kimberleyeleotris hutchinsi)
- Drysdale gudgeon (Kimberleyeleotris notata)

==== Gobies ====
- Caribbean neon goby (Elacatinus lobeli)
- Tidewater goby (Eucyclogobius newberryi)
- Blackthroat goby (Favonigobius melanobranchus)
- Indo-pacific tropical sand goby (Favonigobius reichei)
- Gill's goby (Hetereleotris georgegilli)
- Italian spring goby (Knipowitschia punctatissima)
- Sinarapan (Mistichthys luzonensis)
- Guaymas goby (Quietula guaymasiae)
- Sicydium rosenbergii
- Sicyopterus aiensis
- Stimpson's goby (Sicyopterus stimpsoni)
- Stiphodon oatea
- Bearded eelgoby (Taenioides jacksoni)

==== Sparids ====
- Acanthopagrus chinshira
- Galápagos seabream (Archosargus pourtalesii)
- Carpenter seabream (Argyrozona argyrozona)
- Galápagos porgy (Calamus taurinus)
- Englishman seabream (Chrysoblephus anglicus)
- Roman seabream (Chrysoblephus laticeps)
- Angola dentex (Dentex angolensis)
- West coast seabream (Lithognathus aureti)
- Bronze seabream (Pachymetopon grande)
- Blackspot seabream (Pagellus bogaraveo)
- Musselcracker seabream (Sparodon durbanensis)
- Scup (Stenotomus chrysops)

==== Wrasses ====
- Eastern blue groper (Achoerodus viridis)
- Foxfish (Bodianus frenchii)
- Bower's parrotfish (Chlorurus bowersi)
- Blackspot tuskfish (Choerodon schoenleinii)
- Rainbow parrotfish (Scarus guacamaia)
- Java parrotfish (Scarus hypselopterus)

==== Other Perciformes species ====
- Swallow damsel (Azurina hirundo)
- Ceylonese combtail (Belontia signata)
- Smallscale croaker (Boesemania microlepis)
- Bigeye grunt (Brachydeuterus auritus)
- Nahacky's angelfish (Centropyge nahackyi)
- Rainford's butterflyfish (Chaetodon rainfordi)
- Chevron butterflyfish (Chaetodon trifascialis)
- Channa bleheri
- Channa harcourtbutleri
- Graery threadfin seabass (Cratinus agassizii)
- Frail gourami (Ctenops nobilis)
- Blackbanded sunfish (Enneacanthus chaetodon)
- Enneapterygius leucopunctatus
- Black-arse cod (Epinephelides armatus)
- Lesser African threadfin (Galeoides decadactylus)
- White croaker (Genyonemus lineatus)
- Long-nose sooty grunter (Hephaestus epirrhinos)
- Clipperton angelfish (Holacanthus limbaughi)
- Striated blenny (Hypsoblennius striatus)
- Fortescue grunter (Leiopotherapon aheneus)
- Lupinoblennius vinctus
- Mutton snapper (Lutjanus analis)
- Lane snapper (Lutjanus synagris)
- Ornate paradisefish (Malpulutta kretseri)
- Tufted blenny (Mccoskerichthys sandae)
- Shoal bass (Micropterus cataractae)
- Suwannee bass (Micropterus notius)
- Guadalupe bass (Micropterus treculii)
- Highfin glassy perchlet (Parambassis lala)
- Blackmouth croaker (Pentheroscion mbizi)
- Sailfin stargazer (Platygillellus altivelis)
- Bussing's stargazer (Platygillellus bussingi)
- Prognathodes carlhubbsi
- Pseudogramma axelrodi
- Brown meagre (Sciaena umbra)
- Narrow-barred Spanish mackerel (Scomberomorus commerson)
- Australian spotted mackerel (Scomberomorus munroi)
- Leathery grunter (Scortum hillii)
- Small-headed grunter (Scortum parviceps)
- Serranus dewegeri
- Siniperca undulata
- Baldwin's major (Stegastes baldwini)
- Kimberley grunter (Syncomistes kimberleyensis)
- Drysdale grunter (Syncomistes rastellus)
- Albacore (Thunnus alalunga)
- Yellowfin tuna (Thunnus albacares)
- Pearl gourami (Trichopodus leerii)
- Swordfish (Xiphias gladius)

=== Osteoglossiformes ===
Species

- Royal knifefish (Chitala blanci)
- Chitala chitala
- Marcusenius abadii
- Marcusenius furcidens
- Petrocephalus levequei
- Saratoga (Scleropages leichardti)

Subspecies

- Marcusenius senegalensis pfaffi

=== Characiformes ===
- Brycinus nigricauda
- Brycon alburnus
- Brycon posadae
- Carlastyanax aurocaudatus
- Citharinus eburneensis
- Curimata mivartii
- Cynopotamus magdalenae
- Gephyrocharax chaparae
- Grundulus cochae
- Hemibrycon inambari
- Hyphessobrycon poecilioides
- Ichthyborus quadrilineatus
- Micralestes eburneensis
- Moenkhausia margitae
- Steindachnerina atratoensis
- Steindachnerina corumbae

=== Scorpaeniformes ===
- Artedielloides auriculatus
- Rough sculpin (Cottus asperrimus)
- Shoshone sculpin (Cottus greenei)
- Wood River sculpin (Cottus leiopomus)
- Margined sculpin (Cottus marginatus)

=== Tetraodontiformes ===
- Queen triggerfish (Balistes vetula)
- Tawny puffer (Takifugu flavidus)
- Ocellated puffer (Takifugu ocellatus)
- Japanese pufferfish (Takifugu rubripes)
- Pear puffer (Takifugu vermicularis)

=== Eels ===
- Indian mottled eel (Anguilla bengalensis)
- Shortfin eel (Anguilla bicolor)
- Celebes longfin eel (Anguilla celebesensis)
- Philippine mottled eel (Anguilla luzonensis)
- Bicolor false moray (Chlopsis bicollaris)
- Marble-toothed snake-eel (Pisodonophis daspilotus)

=== Other ray-finned fish ===
Species

- Bonefish (Albula vulpes)
- Ozark cavefish (Amblyopsis rosae)
- Northern cavefish (Amblyopsis spelaea)
- Aquitanian pike (Esox aquitanicus)
- Atlantic halibut (Hippoglossus hippoglossus)
- Canary tonguesole (Cynoglossus canariensis)
- Guinean tonguesole (Cynoglossus monodi)
- Senegalese tonguesole (Cynoglossus senegalensis)
- Reedfish (Erpetoichthys calabaricus)
- Western mud minnow (Galaxiella munda)
- Black-stripe minnow (Galaxiella nigrostriata)
- Garo spineless eel (Garo khajuriai)
- Gymnotus choco
- Indostomus spinosus
- Salamanderfish (Lepidogalaxias salamandroides)
- Cape monk (Lophius vomerinus)
- Mastacembelus sexdecimspinus
- Silver hake (Merluccius bilinearis)
- Deocata pipefish (Microphis deocata)
- Nomorhamphus megarramphus
- Nomorhamphus weberi
- Earspot cusk eel (Ophidion fulvum)
- Southern flounder (Paralichthys lethostigma)
- Leafy seadragon (Phycodurus eques)
- Common seadragon (Phyllopteryx taeniolatus)
- Australian grayling (Prototroctes maraena)
- Pungitius polyakovi
- Mediterranean trout (Salmo cettii)
- Cole's char (Salvelinus colii)
- Beloribitsa (Stenodus leucichthys)
- Southern cavefish (Typhlichthys subterraneus)

Subspecies

- Atlantic sturgeon (Acipenser oxyrinchus oxyrinchus)

Subpopulations

- Sockeye salmon (Oncorhynchus nerka) (2 subpopulations)

== Hagfishes ==
- Inshore hagfish (Eptatretus burgeri)
- Krefft's hagfish (Nemamyxine kreffti)

== See also ==
- Lists of IUCN Red List near threatened species
- List of least concern fishes
- List of vulnerable fishes
- List of endangered fishes
- List of critically endangered fishes
- List of recently extinct fishes
- List of data deficient fishes
- Sustainable seafood advisory lists and certification
