= Cumberland darter =

Conservation status
- Endangered (IUCN 3.1)

Scientific classification
- Kingdom: Animalia
- Phylum: Chordata
- Class: Actinopterygii
- Division: Teleostei
- Order: Perciformes
- Family: Percidae
- Genus: Etheostoma
- Species: E. susanae

Binomial name
- Etheostoma susanae (D. S. Jordan & Swain, 1883)

Synonyms
- Boleosoma susanae D. S. Jordan & Swain, 1883

Species of fish

The Cumberland darter (Etheostoma susanae) is a rare species of freshwater ray-finned fish, a darter from the subfamily Etheostomatinae, part of the family Percidae, which also contains the perches, ruffes and pikeperches. It is endemic to Kentucky and Tennessee in the United States, where it occurs in the upper Cumberland River tributaries above Cumberland Falls. It was federally listed as an endangered species in the US on August 9, 2011.

This fish measures over 5.5 cm in maximum length. It is pale yellow in color with six brown saddle-like markings on the sides. On the male, these markings fade during the breeding season and the fish becomes darker in color.

The Cumberland darter lives in pools and slower, shallower parts of streams, in areas with sand or silt substrates, and not in areas with rocky or cobbly substrates. Associated fish species include creek chub (Semotilus atromaculatus), northern hogsucker (Hypentelium nigricans), stripetail darter (E. kennicotti), and Cumberland arrow darter (E. sagitta).

Little is known about the fish's lifecycle.

This fish is currently known from 13 streams feeding the Cumberland River. It has been extirpated from many areas it previously inhabited.

This species has been hatched and reared in captivity, then released into its natural habitat.

The Cumberland darter was first formally described in 1877 by the American biologists David Starr Jordan (1851–1931) and Joseph Swain (1857–1927), with the type locality given as the Cumberland River near Pleasant View from a tributary of the Clear Fork in Whitley County, Kentucky. The specific name honors Mrs Susan Bowen Jordan, the wife of D.S. Jordan.
