= Doppie =

Doppie may refer to:

- Argyrozona, a monotypic fish genus
- Doppie (coins), the plural form of the Italian gold coin doppia
