= Urotrygon simulatrix =

Conservation status
- Vulnerable (IUCN 3.1)

Scientific classification
- Kingdom: Animalia
- Phylum: Chordata
- Class: Chondrichthyes
- Subclass: Elasmobranchii
- Order: Myliobatiformes
- Family: Urotrygonidae
- Genus: Urotrygon
- Species: U. simulatrix

Binomial name
- Urotrygon simulatrix Miyake & McEachran, 1988

Species of cartilaginous fish

Urotrygon simulatrix, the fake round ray, is a type of marine tropical ray originally found only in Panama, but has also been recorded in other countries.

== Description ==
Not much is known of its biology, except the fact that it has a venomous spine on its tail. This demersal species can reach a maximum total length of approximately 27 cm.

== Habitat & distribution ==
This extremely rare stingray is thought to be an endemic species on Gulf of Panama, but there have been several specimens collected from Mexico and Costa Rica. This species' distribution area is still poorly defined and might be more wide-ranging. It is usually caught as bycatch by fisheries in Gulf of Panama.
