= Urotrygon venezuelae =

Conservation status
- Endangered (IUCN 3.1)

Scientific classification
- Kingdom: Animalia
- Phylum: Chordata
- Class: Chondrichthyes
- Subclass: Elasmobranchii
- Order: Myliobatiformes
- Family: Urotrygonidae
- Genus: Urotrygon
- Species: U. venezuelae

Binomial name
- Urotrygon venezuelae Schultz, 1949

Species of cartilaginous fish

Urotrygon venezuelae, the Venezuelan round ray, is a type of marine tropical ray mainly found in Venezuela.

== Description ==
This species has several characteristics: wide disc, long tail, plain grayish colored dorsal region with no markings, cream colored ventral region, and prickly back. The maximum female specimen of this species is around 36 cm total length.

== Habitat & distribution ==
This extremely rare stingray occurs on western Atlantic Ocean from Cartagena, Colombia, to the Gulf of Venezuela. It inhabits estuaries, marine lakes, and lagoons at depths of 2–40 m. It is often caught as bycatch by Colombian fisheries.
