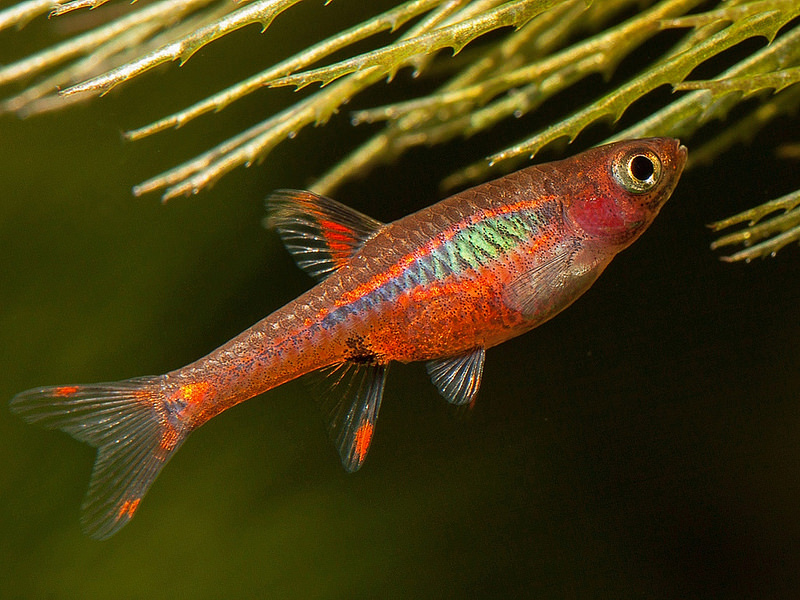

Conservation status
- Data Deficient (IUCN 3.1)

Scientific classification
- Kingdom: Animalia
- Phylum: Chordata
- Class: Actinopterygii
- Order: Cypriniformes
- Family: Danionidae
- Genus: Boraras
- Species: B. brigittae

Binomial name
- Boraras brigittae (Vogt, 1978)

Synonyms
- Rasbora urophthalma brigittae Vogt, 1978; Rasbora brigittae Vogt, 1978

= Boraras brigittae =

Species of fish

Boraras brigittae, also known as the chili rasbora or mosquito rasbora, is a very small species of ray-finned fish in the family Danionidae. It is endemic to the swamps of South West Borneo, Indonesia. It is a popular aquarium fish due to its small size and colorful appearance.

== Etymology ==
Dieter Vogt, who described this species, named it in honor of his wife, Brigitte.

== Distribution and habitat ==
The chili rasbora naturally inhabits blackwater streams and pools of the Borneo peat swamp forests in Indonesia.

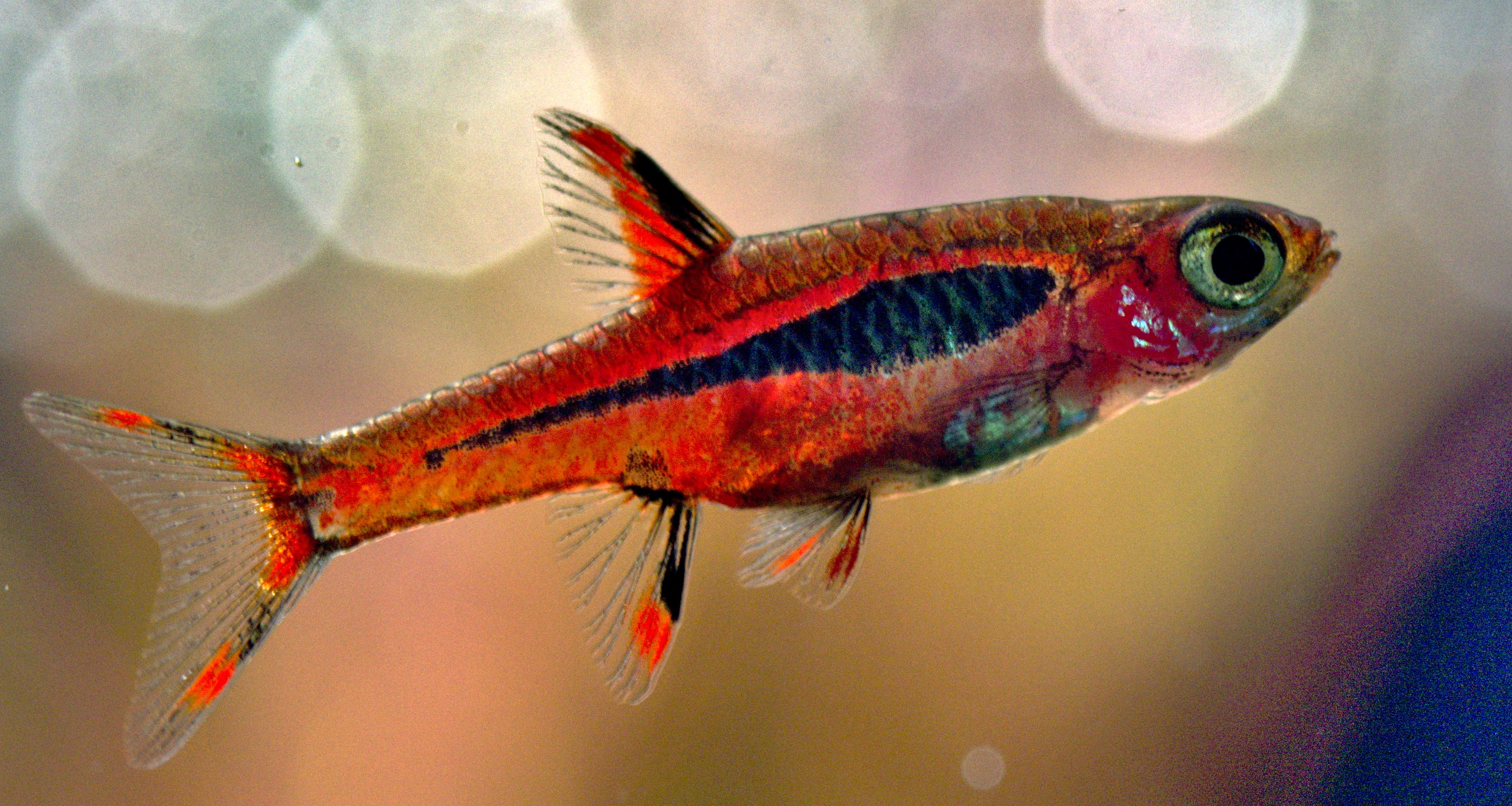
B. brigittae

== Anatomy and appearance ==
Members of this species can range in base body color from a light rusty orange-red to a vibrant red, with a distinctive black stripe that runs along the lateral line. Females in this species have rounder bellies and lighter color than males. The males are smaller than females and more brightly colored, with dominant males displaying the most vibrant coloration. Their sizes range between 10 and 20 mm (0.39–0.79 in), although the largest known specimen had a recorded total length of 3.1 cm (1.2 in).

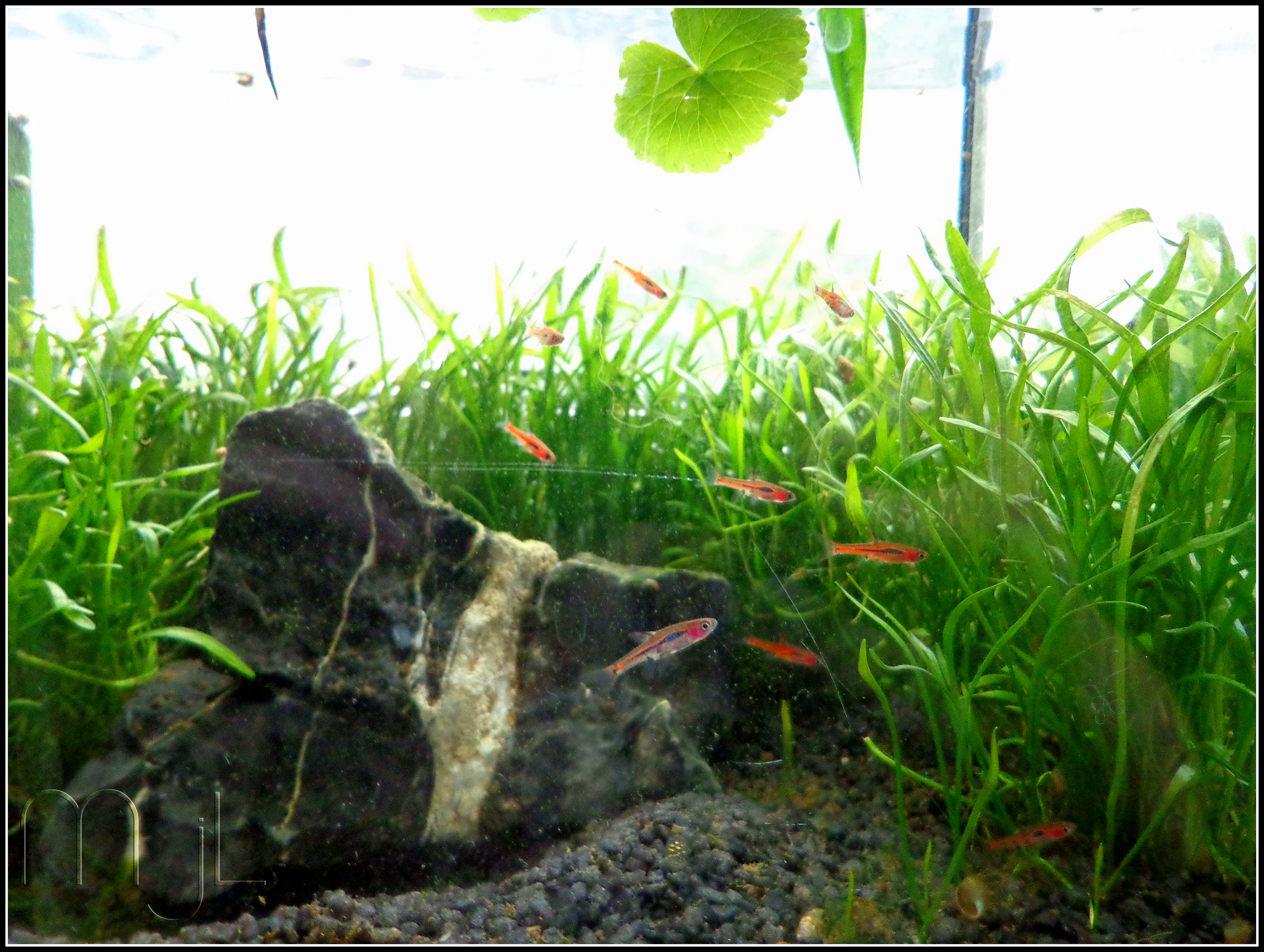
A school of Boraras brigittae in a nano aquarium.

== Diet ==
Chili rasboras, like all members of its genus, are micro-predators with a diet primarily consisting of small insects, worms, crustaceans, and other zooplankton.

== In the aquarium ==
These fishes prefer an aquarium setting that is similar to their natural habitat and can live up to 8 years if properly cared for. They may be fed pellets, frozen food, flakes, young brine shrimp and worms.
