= Brevitrygon manjajiae =

Conservation status
- Near Threatened (IUCN 3.1)

Scientific classification
- Kingdom: Animalia
- Phylum: Chordata
- Class: Chondrichthyes
- Subclass: Elasmobranchii
- Order: Myliobatiformes
- Family: Dasyatidae
- Genus: Brevitrygon
- Species: B. manjajiae

Binomial name
- Brevitrygon manjajiae Last, Weigmann, & Naylor, 2023

Species of fish

Brevitrygon manjajiae, the sandwich-tail whipray, is a type of tropical ray of the family Dasyatidae found in Persian Gulf and Arabian Sea, north-west of Indian Ocean. It lives in the maximum depth of 40 metres (130 ft) in general. This species is often deliberately targeted by local trawlers. In Persian Gulf area, it is considered a low-value catch and usually discarded. In contrast, it is a delicacy and sold locally in Indian seafood markets.

== Description ==
The sandwich-tail whipray has several characteristics, including oval disc, small orbits, relatively short tail with ridge-like ventral fold, relatively small pelvic fins, and predominantly brownish dorsal surface. This species is at least 25 cm (9.8 in) disc width and might reach 35 cm (14 in) disc width.

== Habitat & distribution ==
The sandwich-tail whipray inhabits the continental shelf across its distribution range at the depths of 40 m (130 ft), and to 94 m (310 ft) in Gulf of Oman. This demersal ray faces direct threats because it is regularly captured in the coastal regions of Pakistan and western India. In India, it is retained as consumption and widely sold in traditional markets, mostly on Maharashtra and Gujarat. In Pakistan, the species is retained and usually exported to Southeast Asia for human consumption.
