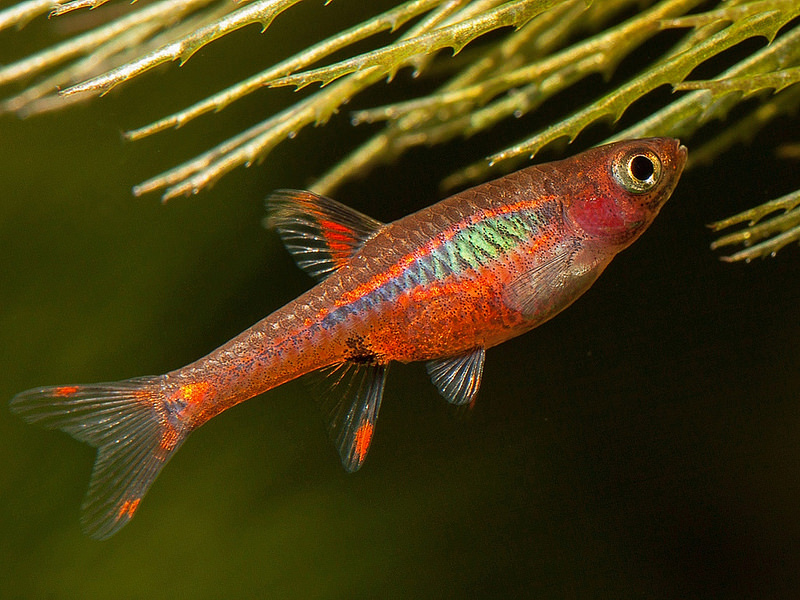
- Chili rasbora, (Boraras brigittae)

Scientific classification
- Kingdom: Animalia
- Phylum: Chordata
- Class: Actinopterygii
- Division: Teleostei
- Order: Cypriniformes
- Family: Danionidae
- Subfamily: Rasborinae
- Genus: Boraras; Kottelat & Vidthayanon, 1993

Type species
- Boraras micros Kottelat & Vidthayanon, 1993

Species
- 6, see text.

= Boraras =

Genus of fishes

Boraras is a genus of freshwater ray-finned fishes belonging to the subfamily Rasborinae - the Rasbora, which along with sister subfamily Danioninae (Danio, Devario, Microdevario) comprise the family Danionidae, group popular among freshwater aquarium hobbyists.

The fish in this genus are found in Asia.

== Species ==
There are currently six valid species:

Image	Species	Common name
	Boraras brigittae (D. Vogt, 1978)	Chili rasbora, mosquito rasbora
	Boraras maculatus (Duncker, 1904)	Dwarf rasbora, spotted rasbora
	Boraras merah (Kottelat, 1991)	Phoenix rasbora
	Boraras micros Kottelat & Vidthayanon, 1993	Three-spotted dwarf rasbora
	Boraras naevus Conway & Kottelat, 2011	Strawberry rasbora
	Boraras urophthalmoides (Kottelat, 1991)	Least rasbora, exclamation point rasbora
