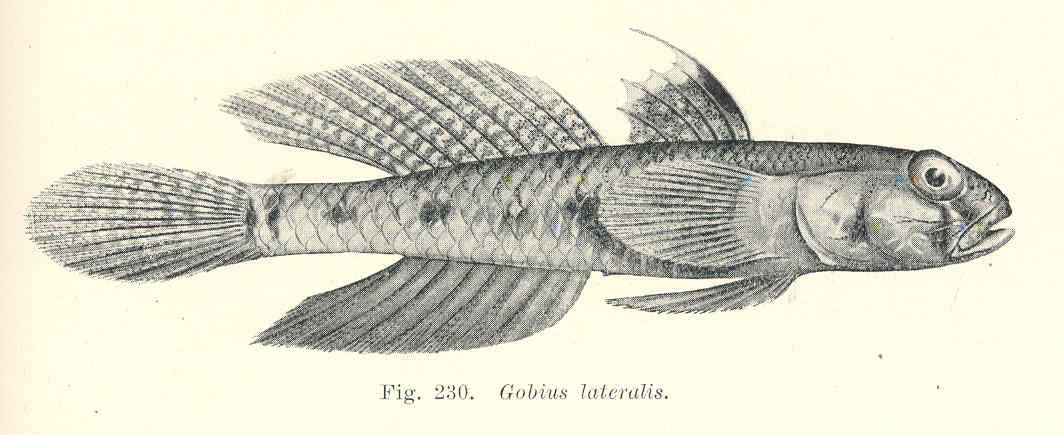

Scientific classification
- Domain: Eukaryota
- Kingdom: Animalia
- Phylum: Chordata
- Class: Actinopterygii
- Order: Gobiiformes
- Family: Gobiidae
- Genus: Favonigobius
- Species: F. lateralis

Binomial name
- Favonigobius lateralis (W. J. Macleay, 1881)

Synonyms
- Gobius lateralis W. J. Macleay, 1881

= Favonigobius lateralis =

Species of fish

Favonigobius lateralis is a species of goby native to coastal waters of eastern Australia, Tasmania and New Zealand where it can be found in marine and brackish waters of sandy estuaries. It prefers to live in beds of seagrass. This species can reach a length of 9 centimetres (3.5 in) TL.
