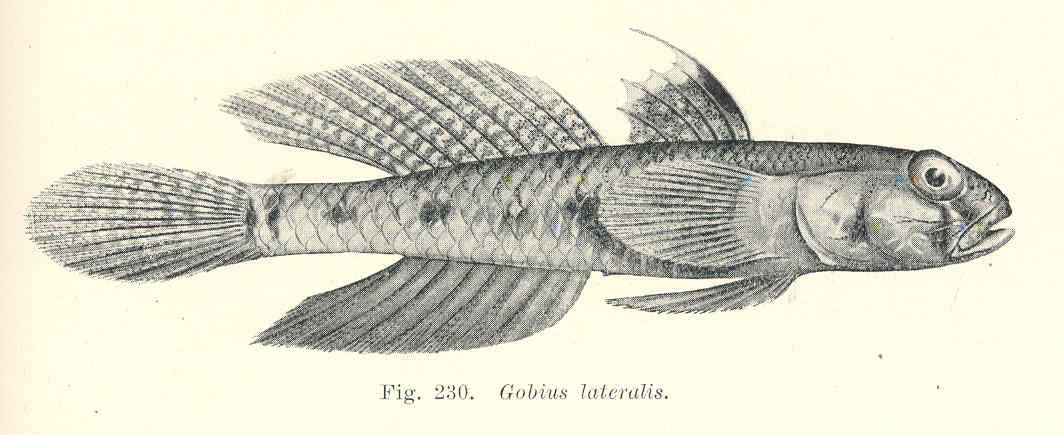
- Favonigobius lateralis

Scientific classification
- Kingdom: Animalia
- Phylum: Chordata
- Class: Actinopterygii
- Order: Gobiiformes
- Family: Gobiidae
- Subfamily: Gobiinae
- Genus: Favonigobius; Whitley, 1930

Type species
- Gobius lateralis W. J. Macleay, 1881

Synonyms
- Aurigobius Whitley, 1959; Papillogobius H. S. Gill & P. J. Miller, 1990; Thalassogobius Herre, 1953

= Favonigobius =

Genus of fishes

Favonigobius is a genus of gobies native to fresh, brackish and marine waters around the Indian Ocean and the western Pacific Ocean. Commonly called "sand gobies", this term more alternatively refers to the family Kraemeriidae, a relative of the true gobies.

== Species ==
There are currently nine recognized species in this genus:

- Favonigobius exquisitus Whitley, 1950 (exquisite sand goby)
- Favonigobius gymnauchen (Bleeker, 1860) (sharp-nosed sand goby)
- Favonigobius lateralis (W. J. Macleay, 1881)
- Favonigobius lentiginosus (J. Richardson, 1844)
- Favonigobius melanobranchus (Fowler, 1934) (blackthroat goby)
- Favonigobius opalescens (Herre, 1936)
- Favonigobius phaiospilosoma (Bleeker, 1849)
- Favonigobius punctatus (H. S. Gill & P. J. Miller, 1990)
- Favonigobius reichei (Bleeker, 1854) (Indopacific tropical sand goby)

Synonyms

- Favonigobius aliciae (Herre, 1936); valid as F. reichei
