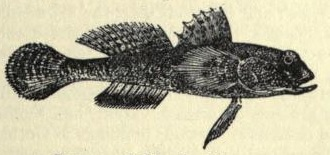

Scientific classification
- Kingdom: Animalia
- Phylum: Chordata
- Class: Actinopterygii
- Order: Gobiiformes
- Family: Gobiidae
- Genus: Favonigobius
- Species: F. lentiginosus

Binomial name
- Favonigobius lentiginosus (J. Richardson, 1844)

Synonyms
- Gobius lentiginosus J. Richardson, 1844; Acentrogobius lentiginosus (J. Richardson, 1844)

= Favonigobius lentiginosus =

Species of fish

Favonigobius lentiginosus is a species of goby native to the coastal waters of Australia and New Zealand. This species can reach a length of 6 centimetres (2.4 in) TL.
