= Urotrygon cimar =

Conservation status
- Near Threatened (IUCN 3.1)

Scientific classification
- Kingdom: Animalia
- Phylum: Chordata
- Class: Chondrichthyes
- Subclass: Elasmobranchii
- Order: Myliobatiformes
- Family: Urotrygonidae
- Genus: Urotrygon
- Species: U. cimar

Binomial name
- Urotrygon cimar López S. & Bussing, 1998

Urotrygon cimar, the Cimar round ray, is a type of tropical marine ray found exclusively in the eastern central Pacific ocean, specifically south coastal regions stretching from Mexico to Costa Rica.

== Description ==
This species can be distinguished from several characteristics: round disc; short tail; tan or yellow-brown dorsal surface, covered with irregular brown or black spots/blotches; white ventral surface with disc's lateral margins; and dark brown or gray posterior border of pelvic fins. The maximum total length of this species is approximately 38 cm.

== Habitat & distribution ==
This stingray inhabits shallow coastal regions in Chiapas and Oaxaca states of Mexico, Guatemala, El Salvador, Corinto town of Nicaragua, and Nicoya Gulf of Costa Rica. It is mostly found in tide pools and to a depth of 85 m, albeit usually recorded in waters shallower than 10 m.
