= Syncomistes =

- S. butleri

Scientific classification
- Kingdom: Animalia
- Phylum: Chordata
- Class: Actinopterygii
- Division: Teleostei
- Order: Centrarchiformes
- Family: Terapontidae
- Genus: Syncomistes; Vari, 1978

Type species
- Syncomistes butleri Vari, 1978

Species
- see text

Genus of ray-finned fishes

Syncomistes is a genus of Australian freshwater ray-finned fish in the family Terapontidae, the grunters.

== Species ==
Species include:

- Syncomistes bonapartensis Shelley, Delaval & Le Feuvre, 2017
- Syncomistes butleri Vari 1978 (Sharpnose grunter)
- Syncomistes carcharus Shelley, Delaval & Le Feuvre, 2017 (Sharp-toothed grunter)
- Syncomistes dilliensis Shelley, Delaval & Le Feuvre, 2017 (Dillie grunter)
- Syncomistes holsworthi Shelley, Delaval & Le Feuvre, 2017
- Syncomistes kimberleyensis Vari 1978 (Kimberley grunter)
- Syncomistes moranensis Shelley, Delaval & Le Feuvre, 2017
- Syncomistes rastellus Vari & Hutchins, 1978 (Drysdale grunter)
- Syncomistes trigonicus Vari, 1978 (Longnose grunter)
- Syncomistes versicolor Shelley, Delaval & Le Feuvre, 2017
- Syncomistes wunambal Shelley, Delaval & Le Feuvre, 2017
