= Brevitrygon javaensis =

Conservation status
- Endangered (IUCN 3.1)

Scientific classification
- Kingdom: Animalia
- Phylum: Chordata
- Class: Chondrichthyes
- Subclass: Elasmobranchii
- Order: Myliobatiformes
- Family: Dasyatidae
- Genus: Brevitrygon
- Species: B. javaensis

Binomial name
- Brevitrygon javaensis Last & White, 2013

Brevitrygon javaensis, the Javan whipray, is a type of tropical ray of the family Dasyatidae found exclusively in Java, Indonesia. It lives in the maximum depth of 100 metres (330 ft). This species is often caught in the tangle nets meant for catching crustaceans. However, it is also retained for consumption by local communities.

== Description ==
Not much is known about the biology, although it is believed that the adults specimens generally reached 18 cm (7.1 in) in disc width, while the maximum ever recorded is approximately 23–24 cm (9.1–9.4 in) disc width.

== Habitat & distribution ==
This benthic species is usually found on soft bottoms at the maximum depths of 100 meters. Its endemic habitat is the coastal regions south of Java island, specifically Central Java and West Java. However, it might be found inshore near human populated areas, which making it prone being caught by local trawlers.
