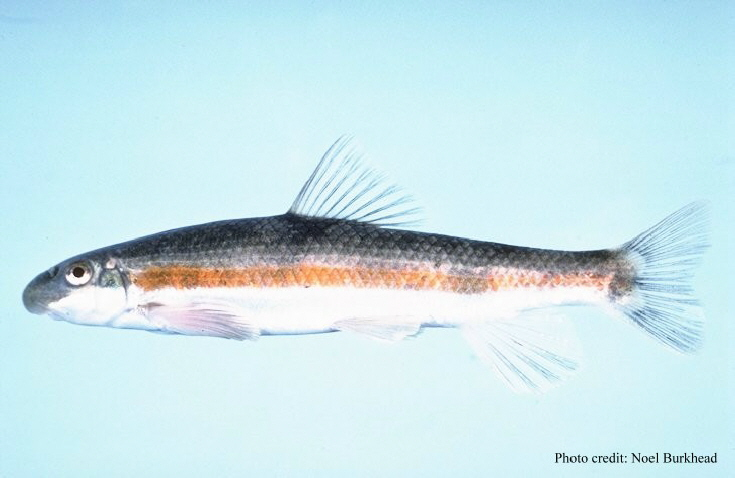
- Torrent sucker Thoburnia rhothoeca

Scientific classification
- Kingdom: Animalia
- Phylum: Chordata
- Class: Actinopterygii
- Order: Cypriniformes
- Family: Catostomidae
- Subfamily: Catostominae
- Genus: Thoburnia; D. S. Jordan & Snyder, 1917

Type species
- Catostomus rhotothecus Thoburn, 1896

= Thoburnia =

Genus of fishes

Thoburnia is a genus of suckers found in the eastern United States. There are currently two recognized species in this genus. Formerly regarded as a subgenus of the genus Moxostoma before elevation to full genus.

== Species ==
- Thoburnia hamiltoni Raney & Lachner, 1946 (Rustyside sucker)
- Thoburnia rhothoeca (Thoburn, 1896) (Torrent sucker)

The species T. atripinnis, formerly placed in this genus, is now placed in its own genus, Vexillichthys. Phylogenetic analysis suggests that Vexillichthys is more closely related to hogsuckers than to other species of Thoburnia.
