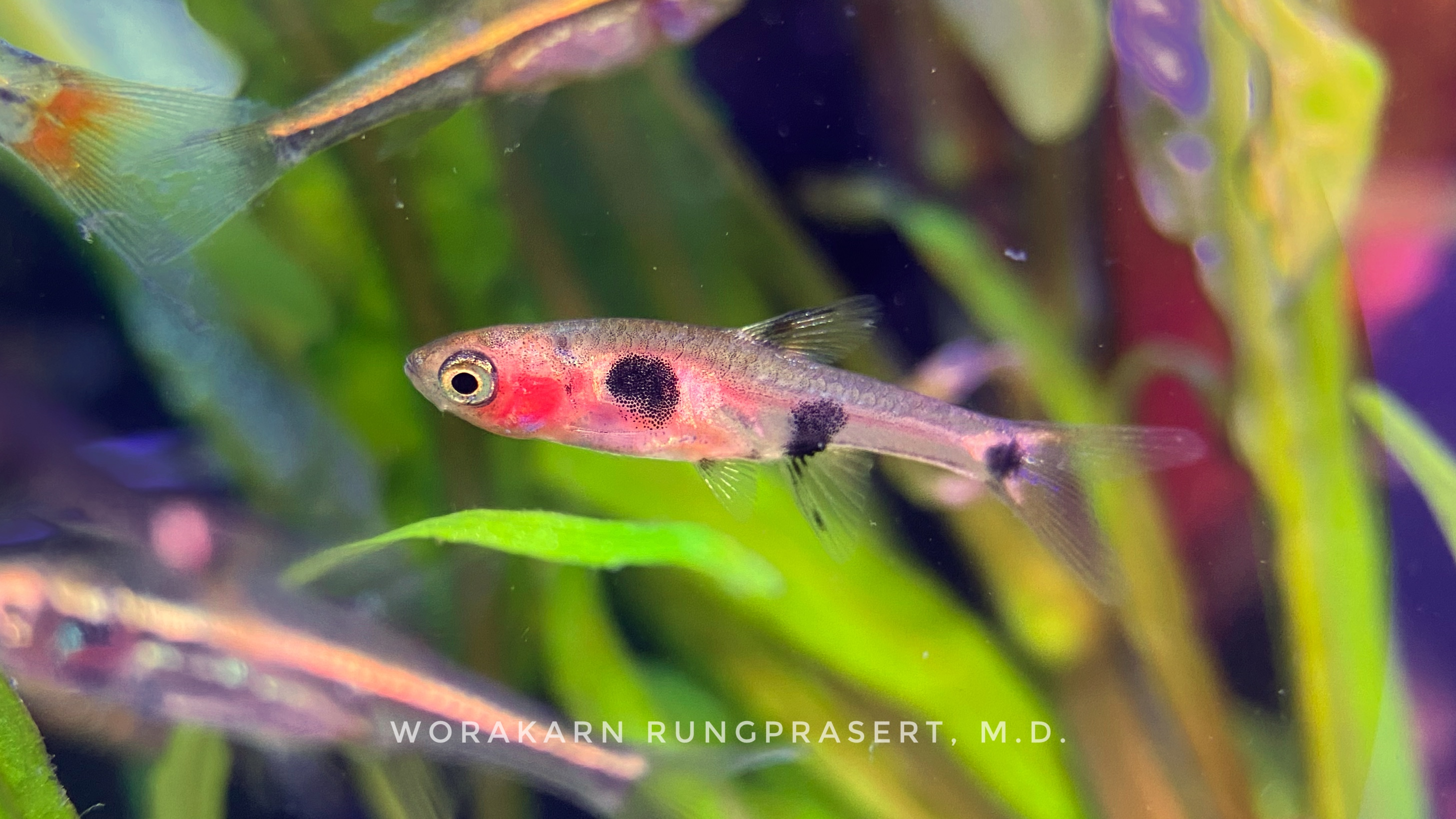

Conservation status
- Least Concern (IUCN 3.1)

Scientific classification
- Kingdom: Animalia
- Phylum: Chordata
- Class: Actinopterygii
- Order: Cypriniformes
- Family: Danionidae
- Genus: Boraras
- Species: B. maculatus

Binomial name
- Boraras maculatus (Duncker, 1904)

Synonyms
- Rasbora maculata Duncker, 1904

= Dwarf rasbora =

Species of fish

The dwarf rasbora (Boraras maculatus) is a species of ray-finned fish in the genus Boraras, native to freshwater habitats of southeast Asia. It grows to be about 10–20mm (0.4–0.8 inches) long at adulthood, the maximum length can reach 25mm (1 inches). Dwarf Rasbora are shoaling fish which means they are always in groups of 8 fish or more. They are very peaceful species that don't harm anyone or anything.
