= Smalleyed round stingray =

Conservation status
- Critically Endangered (IUCN 3.1)

Scientific classification
- Kingdom: Animalia
- Phylum: Chordata
- Class: Chondrichthyes
- Subclass: Elasmobranchii
- Order: Myliobatiformes
- Family: Urotrygonidae
- Genus: Urotrygon
- Species: U. microphthalmum

Binomial name
- Urotrygon microphthalmum Delsman, 1941

Species of fish

The smalleyed round stingray (Urotrygon microphthalmum) is a species of fish in the family Urotrygonidae. It is found in Brazil, French Guiana, Guyana, Suriname, and Venezuela. Its natural habitats are open seas and shallow seas.
