= Brevitrygon heterura =

Conservation status
- Vulnerable (IUCN 3.1)

Scientific classification
- Kingdom: Animalia
- Phylum: Chordata
- Class: Chondrichthyes
- Subclass: Elasmobranchii
- Order: Myliobatiformes
- Family: Dasyatidae
- Genus: Brevitrygon
- Species: B. heterura

Binomial name
- Brevitrygon heterura Bleeker, 1852

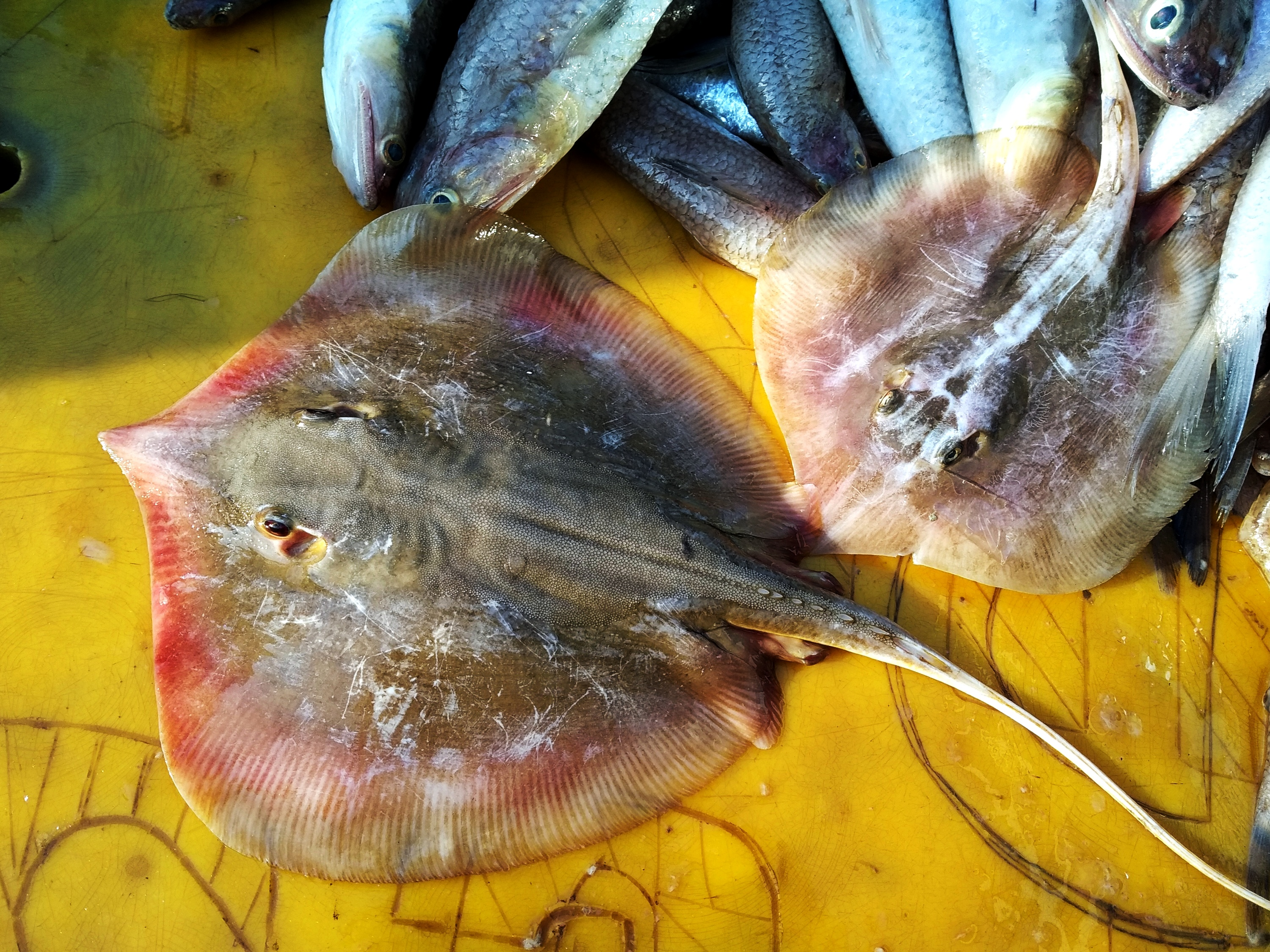

Brevitrygon heterura, the dwarf whipray, is a type of ray of the family Dasyatidae found in the Indo-Malay Archipelago, from Indonesia to Vietnam. It inhabits shallow waters in the depth of 25–50 metres (80–160 ft). This species is one of the most common small ray captured in Indonesia and considered a local delicacy.

== Description ==
The dwarf whipray can be identified through several characteristics, including oval-shaped disc, broad pointed snout, plain colored dorsal surface, absence of skin folds on the tail, and rounded pectoral-fin apex. Female specimens of this species can reach a maximum size of approximately 24 cm (9.4 in) disc width.

== Habitat & distribution ==
This demersal ray is usually found in inshore or brackish waters to the depth of 50 metres (160 ft). It's endemic distribution range stretches from Indonesia, Singapore, Malaysia, Brunei, Thailand, and Vietnam.

The dwarf whipray faces direct threats by trawlers on Malacca Strait and Sunda Strait because it is considered as delicacy, mainly in Indonesia.
