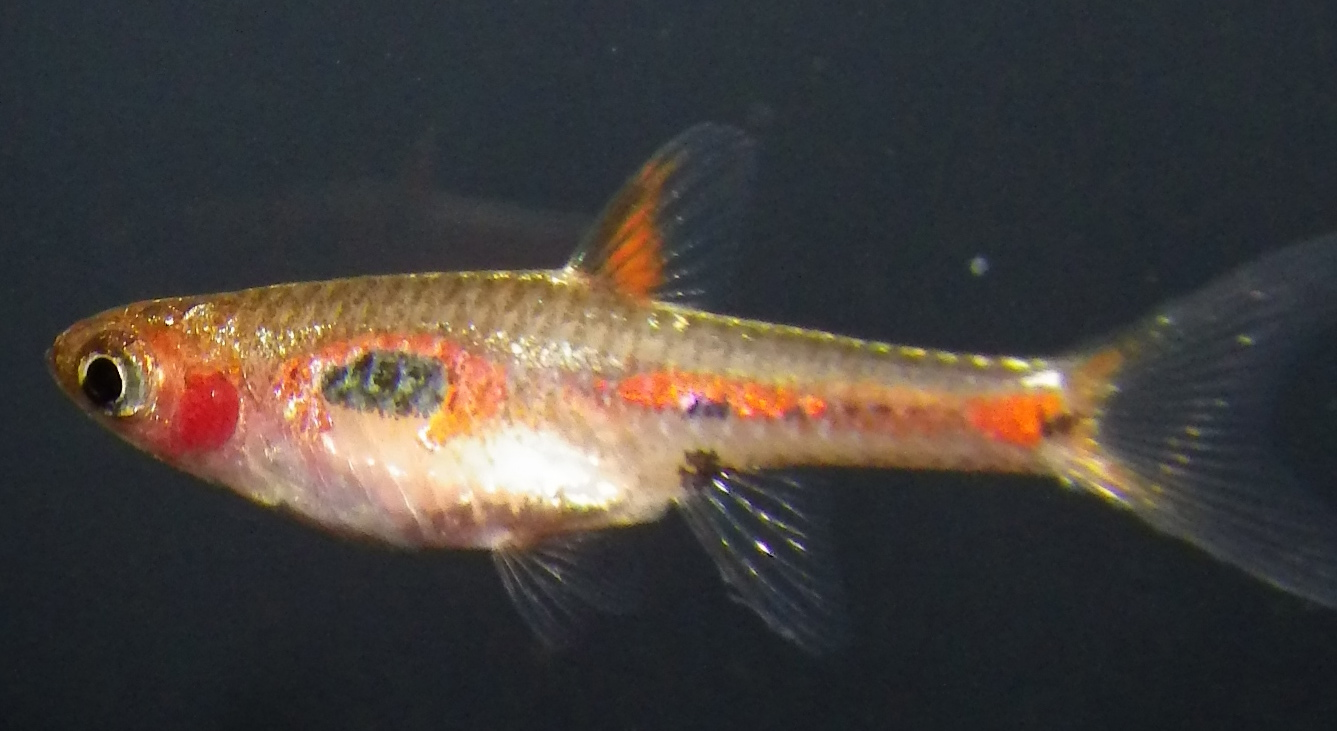

Conservation status
- Data Deficient (IUCN 3.1)

Scientific classification
- Kingdom: Animalia
- Phylum: Chordata
- Class: Actinopterygii
- Order: Cypriniformes
- Family: Danionidae
- Genus: Boraras
- Species: B. merah

Binomial name
- Boraras merah (Kottelat, 1991)

Synonyms
- Rasbora nerah Kottelat, 1991

= Boraras merah =

Species of fish

Boraras merah is a species of ray-finned fish in the genus Boraras, also known as Phoenix rasbora. It is between 15 and 20mm long with a red base colour to the body.

== Etymology ==
Boraras is an anagram of Rasbora (a generic term for the group that includes this species), highlighting the reversal of the ratio of abdominal and caudal vertebrae in this species. Merah is the Indonesian word for red due to its body colour.

== Distribution and habitat ==
It is found in southern and western Borneo where it inhabits freshwater streams and rivers with a high peat content.
