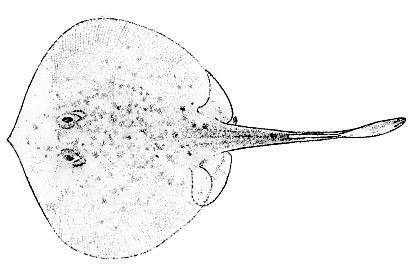
- Urotrygon caudispinosus

Scientific classification
- Kingdom: Animalia
- Phylum: Chordata
- Class: Chondrichthyes
- Subclass: Elasmobranchii
- Order: Myliobatiformes
- Family: Urotrygonidae
- Genus: Urotrygon; T. N. Gill, 1863

Type species
- Urotrygon mundus T. N. Gill, 1863

= Urotrygon =

Genus of cartilaginous fishes

Urotrygon is a genus of American round stingrays.

== Species ==
There are currently thirteen recognized species in this genus:

- Urotrygon aspidura D. S. Jordan & C. H. Gilbert, 1882 (Spiny-tail round ray)
- Urotrygon caudispinosus Hildebrand, 1946 (Spine-tailed round ray)
- Urotrygon chilensis Günther, 1872 (Chilean round ray)
- Urotrygon cimar López S. & W. A. Bussing, 1998 (Denticled roundray)
- Urotrygon microphthalmum Delsman, 1941 (Smalleyed round stingray)
- Urotrygon munda T. N. Gill, 1863 (Munda round ray)
- Urotrygon nana Miyake & McEachran, 1988 (Dwarf round ray)
- Urotrygon peruanus Hildebrand, 1946 (Peruvian stingray)
- Urotrygon reticulata Miyake & McEachran, 1988 (Reticulate round ray)
- Urotrygon rogersi D. S. Jordan & Starks, 1895 (Roger's round ray)
- Urotrygon serrula Hildebrand, 1946 (Saw-spined round ray)
- Urotrygon simulatrix Miyake & McEachran, 1988 (Fake round ray)
- Urotrygon venezuelae L. P. Schultz, 1949 (Venezuela round stingray)
