= Urotrygon reticulata =

Conservation status
- Critically Endangered (IUCN 3.1)

Scientific classification
- Kingdom: Animalia
- Phylum: Chordata
- Class: Chondrichthyes
- Subclass: Elasmobranchii
- Order: Myliobatiformes
- Family: Urotrygonidae
- Genus: Urotrygon
- Species: U. reticulata

Binomial name
- Urotrygon reticulata Miyake & McEachran, 1988

Species of cartilaginous fish

Urotrygon reticulata, the reticulate round ray, is a type of marine tropical ray found only in Panama.

== Description ==
Not much is known of its biology, except the fact that it has a venomous spine on its tail. This demersal species can reach a maximum total length of approximately 24 cm.

== Habitat & distribution ==
This extremely rare stingray is an endemic species on Gulf of Panama. It inhabits very shallow coastal waters at depths of 1-15 m. Round rays, including this species, have little commercial value in Panama, so they are usually discarded when caught.
