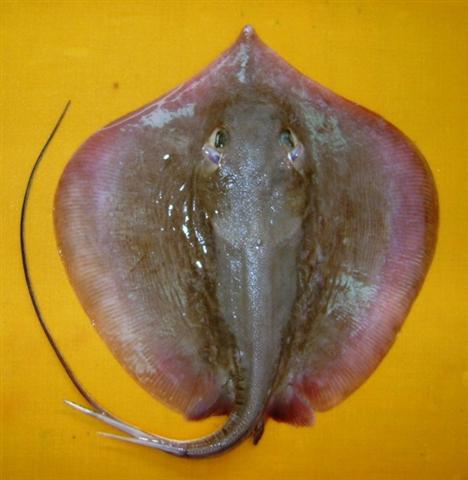
- B. walga

Scientific classification
- Kingdom: Animalia
- Phylum: Chordata
- Class: Chondrichthyes
- Subclass: Elasmobranchii
- Order: Myliobatiformes
- Family: Dasyatidae
- Subfamily: Urogymninae
- Genus: Brevitrygon; Last, Naylor & Manjaji-Matsumoto, 2016

Type species
- Dasyatis javaensis Last & White, 2013

= Brevitrygon =

Genus of cartilaginous fishes

Brevitrygon is a genus of stingrays in the family Dasyatidae from the Indo-Pacific. Its species were formerly contained within the genus Himantura.

== Species ==
- Brevitrygon heterura (Bleeker, 1852) (Dwarf Whipray)
- Brevitrygon imbricata (Bloch & Schneider 1801) (Scaly whipray)
- Brevitrygon javaensis (Last & White, 2013) (Javan whipray)
- Brevitrygon manjajiae Last, Weigmann & Naylor, 2024 (Sandwich-tail Whipray)
- Brevitrygon walga (Müller & Henle, 1841) (Dwarf whipray)
