= Three-spotted dwarf minnow =

Boraras micros

Conservation status
- Least Concern (IUCN 3.1)

Scientific classification
- Domain: Eukaryota
- Kingdom: Animalia
- Phylum: Chordata
- Class: Actinopterygii
- Order: Cypriniformes
- Family: Danionidae
- Genus: Boraras
- Species: B. micros

Binomial name
- Boraras micros Kottelat & Vidthayanon, 1993

Species of fish

The three-spotted dwarf minnow (Boraras micros) is a species of ray-finned fish in the genus Boraras.

The Dwarf Minnow is typically characterized by three striking black dots (one on the base of its anal fin, one on the side, and one on its caudal fin).

One way to distinguish the female minnows from the males is the phenotype alone. Females appear larger and have more pronounced, rounded abdomens.

The Three-Spotted Dwarf Minnow can grow up to 2 centimeters and can have a lifespan of about 2–5 years.
