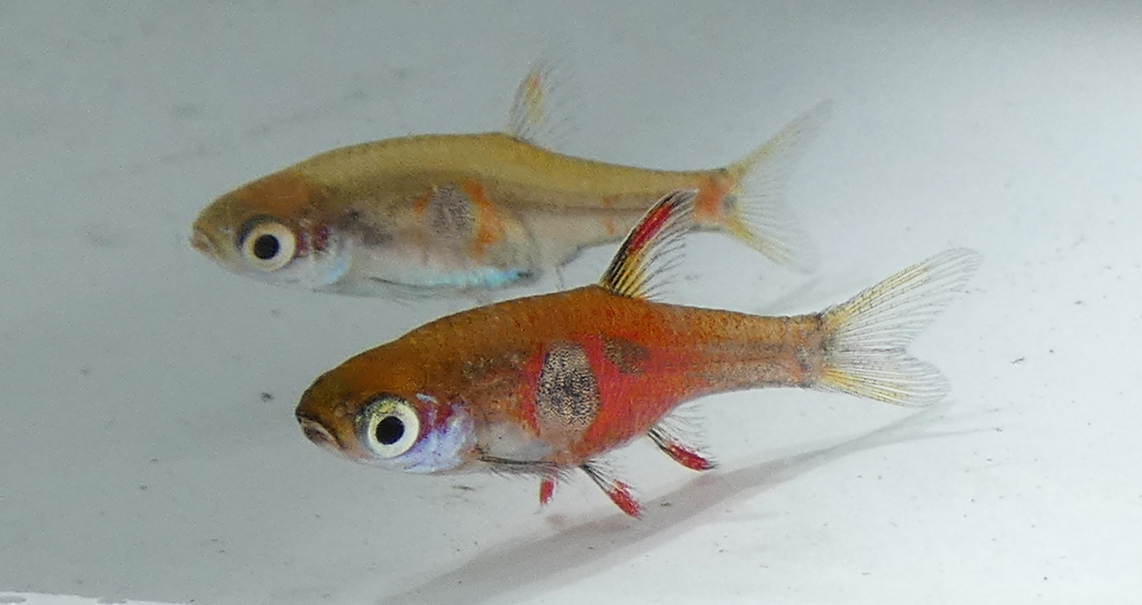
- wild-caught boraras naevus pair

Conservation status
- Data Deficient (IUCN 3.1)

Scientific classification
- Kingdom: Animalia
- Phylum: Chordata
- Class: Actinopterygii
- Order: Cypriniformes
- Family: Danionidae
- Genus: Boraras
- Species: B. naevus

Binomial name
- Boraras naevus Conway & Kottelat, 2011

= Boraras naevus =

Species of fish

Boraras naevus, commonly known as the Strawberry Rasbora, is a fish in the family Cyprinidae endemic to Thailand. Its locations include swampy areas north of Surat Thani, the Tapi River drainage (located on the Gulf of Thailand), and the Andaman Sea slope of the Malay Peninsula near Trang.
