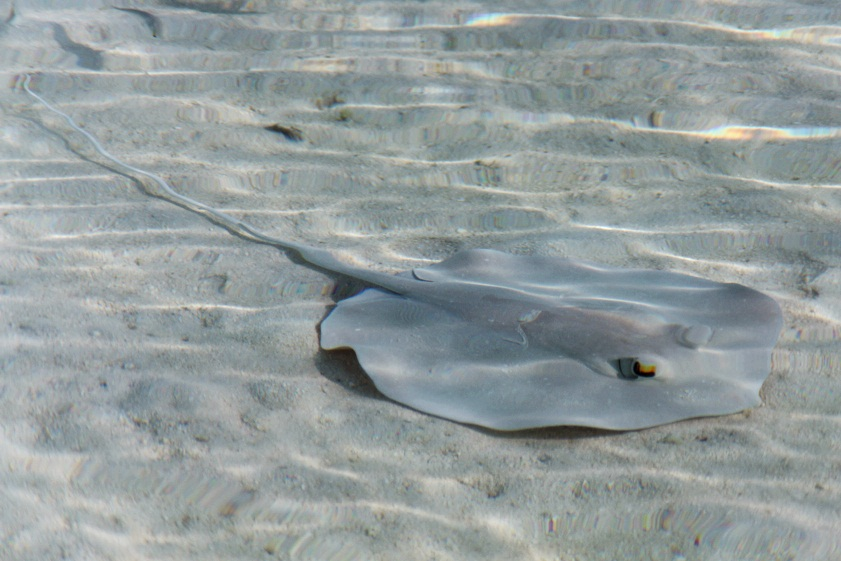

Conservation status
- Vulnerable (IUCN 3.1)

Scientific classification
- Kingdom: Animalia
- Phylum: Chordata
- Class: Chondrichthyes
- Subclass: Elasmobranchii
- Order: Myliobatiformes
- Family: Dasyatidae
- Genus: Brevitrygon
- Species: B. imbricata

Binomial name
- Brevitrygon imbricata (Bloch & J. G. Schneider, 1801)

Synonyms
- Amphotistius imbricatus (Bloch & Schneider, 1801); Dasyatis imbricata (Bloch & Schneider, 1801); Dasybatus imbricatus (Bloch & Schneider, 1801); Himantura dadong (Bleeker 1877); Himantura imbricata (Bloch & Schneider, 1801); Leiobatis polylepis (Bleeker, 1852); Raja obtusa Ehrenberg, 1871; Raja imbricata Bloch & Schneider, 1801; Trygon imbricata (Bloch & Schneider, 1801)

= Scaly whipray =

Species of cartilaginous fish

The scaly whipray or Bengal whipray, (Brevitrygon imbricata) is a species of stingray in the family Dasyatidae, found in the tropical Indo-West Pacific oceans from the Red Sea and Mauritius to Indonesia. Its width is up to 22 cm (8.7 in), and it may reach 65 cm (2 ft 2 in) in total length.

The scaly whipray is found in inshore coastal waters, typically in estuarine habitats. Some uncertainty exists over the details of its habitat preference and full range due to confusion with the very similar Brevitrygon walga, and reports from Tonlé Sap ("Great Lake") possibly refer to Hemitrygon laosensis. The disc width of the scaly whipray is equal to its disc length, and the tail is shorter than the body. The ventral surface of the disc is entirely white. Young and adults feed on benthic invertebrates, and juveniles may be present in mangroves.

They migrate between saltwater and freshwater, though not for the purpose of breeding. They do not migrate more than 100 km (62 mi).

Reproduction is ovoviviparous.
