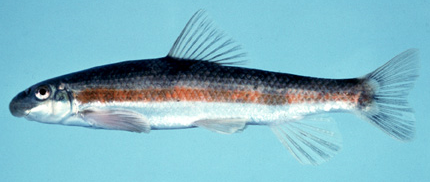

Conservation status
- Least Concern (IUCN 3.1)

Scientific classification
- Kingdom: Animalia
- Phylum: Chordata
- Class: Actinopterygii
- Order: Cypriniformes
- Family: Catostomidae
- Genus: Thoburnia
- Species: T. rhothoeca

Binomial name
- Thoburnia rhothoeca (Thoburn, 1896 )

Synonyms
- Catostomus rhothoecus Thoburn, 1896

= Thoburnia rhothoeca =

Species of fish

Thoburnia rhothoeca (common name torrent sucker) is a species of fish native to Virginia and West Virginia.

== Description ==
Thoburnia rhothoeca has a small mouth with lower lip edges that are nearly triangular. The sucker has a small black skull and two air-bladders, although the air-bladders are reduced in size. The fish is small in size, and generally does not exceed seven inches. The fish exhibits sexual dimorphism, and its appearance varies depending on gender.

The male sucker has a narrow red lateral band on it and a long dorsal and ventral fin. The female sucker has a narrow brown lateral band on it, and a shorter dorsal and ventral fin.

== Habitat ==
The habitat of the sucker extends from Northern Virginia to Eastern West Virginia. It is generally found in the James River and its discharges, although populations also exist in the Potomac River and its discharges.

The fish is generally found in creeks and small rivers. It prefers clear waters with a rocky gradient and can live in waters with temperatures ranging from warm to cold. Younger Thoburnia rhothoeca can generally be found in smaller pools.

== Behavior ==
Thoburnia rhothoeca reach sexual maturity after one to two years of life. The sucker reproduces through spawning, which generally occurs from February to May. Female suckers lay an average of approximately 780 oocytes during spawning season with an average diameter of approximately two millimeters.

The sucker is primarily a carnivore. Most of its diet consists of Chironomidae, although it will consume many other of species of insects when they are available. The sucker will also consume detritus.

== Conservation status ==
The sucker is ranked as least concern by the International Union for Conservation of Nature. Reasons for the rating include the stable population and the large range of the sucker.
