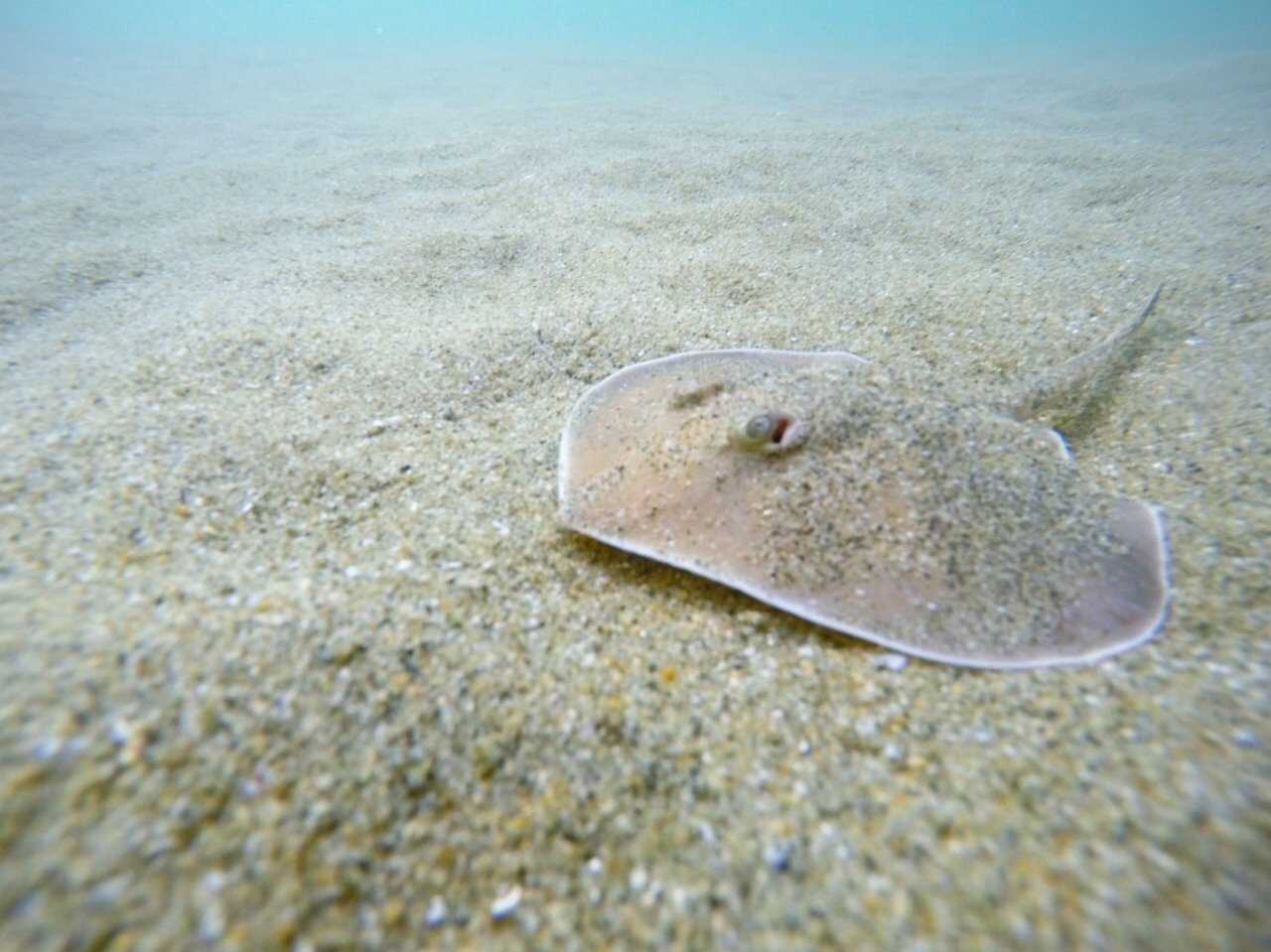

Conservation status
- Near Threatened (IUCN 3.1)

Scientific classification
- Kingdom: Animalia
- Phylum: Chordata
- Class: Chondrichthyes
- Subclass: Elasmobranchii
- Order: Myliobatiformes
- Family: Urotrygonidae
- Genus: Urotrygon
- Species: U. rogersi

Binomial name
- Urotrygon rogersi Jordan & Starks, 1895

= Urotrygon rogersi =

Species of cartilaginous fish

Urotrygon rogersi, or Rogers' round ray, is a type of marine tropical ray found across the south coastal regions of Central America and some areas of South America.

== Description ==
Not much is known of its biology, except the fact that it feeds on small fish and microcrustaceans, and possesses a venomous spine on its tail. This species can reach a maximum total length of 46 cm, although the common total length is around 37 cm.

== Habitat & distribution ==
This stingray's distribution range stretches from Gulf of California in Mexico to coastal waters of Ecuador. It inhabits shallow inshore waters at depths of 1-30 m. It is also often caught as bycatch in the regions mentioned.
