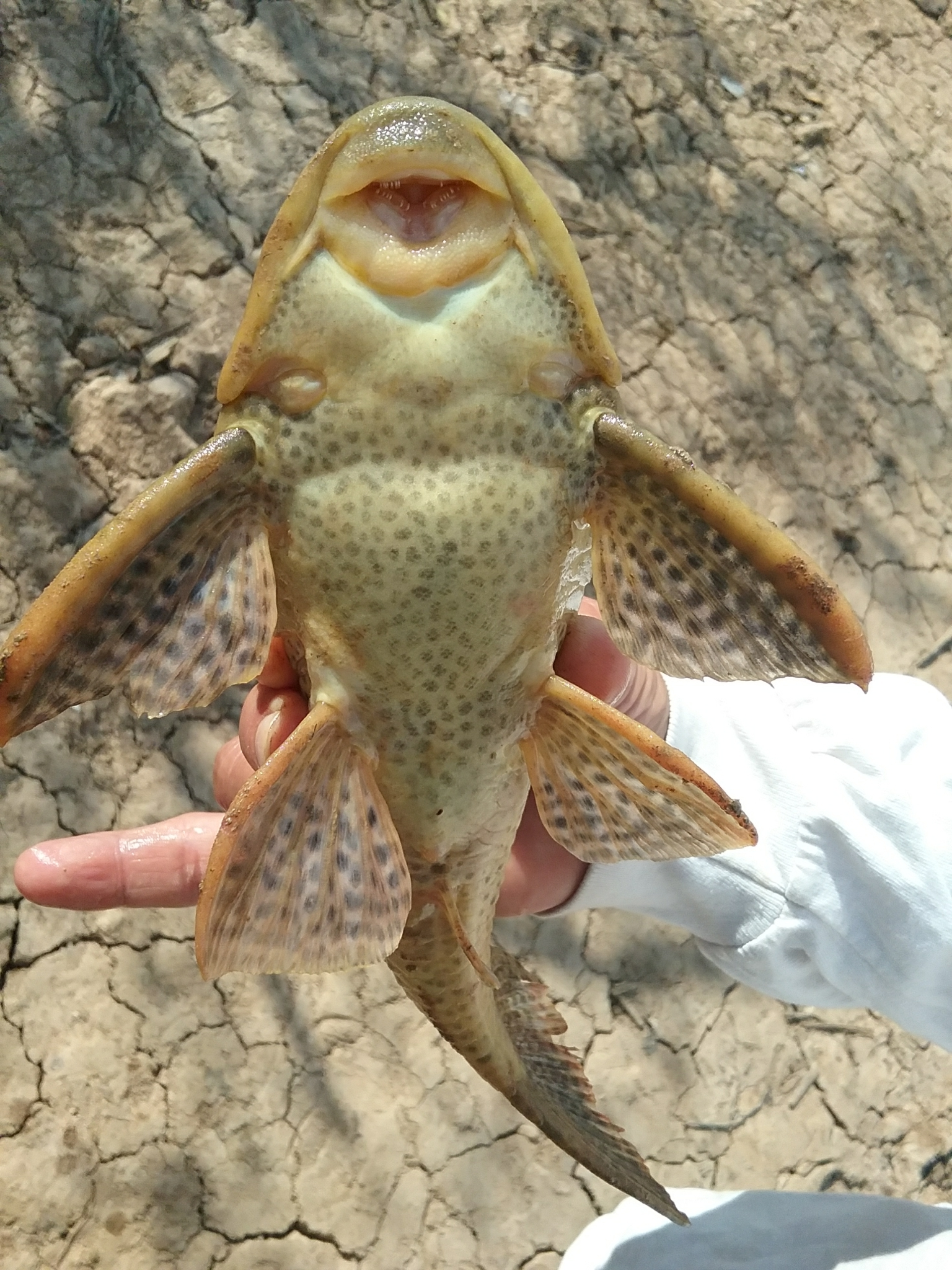

Conservation status
- Near Threatened (IUCN 3.1)

Scientific classification
- Kingdom: Animalia
- Phylum: Chordata
- Class: Actinopterygii
- Division: Teleostei
- Order: Siluriformes
- Family: Loricariidae
- Genus: Hypostomus
- Species: H. bolivianus

Binomial name
- Hypostomus bolivianus (Pearson, 1924)

Synonyms
- Plecostomus bolivianus Pearson, 1924

= Hypostomus bolivianus =

Species of catfish

Hypostomus bolivianus is a species of freshwater ray-finned fish belonging to the family Loricariidae, the suckermouth armored catfishes, and the subfamily Hypostominae, the suckermouth catfishes. This catfish is endemic to Bolivia, the country for which it is named, where it occurs in the Mamoré River basin. It is known from three localities within that basin: Popoi, Alto Beni and Palos Blancos. This species reaches a total length of 15 cm (5.9 in) and is believed to be a facultative air-breather.
