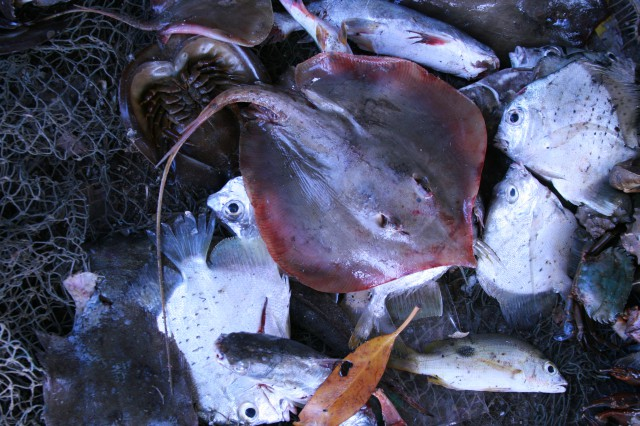

Conservation status
- Near Threatened (IUCN 3.1)

Scientific classification
- Kingdom: Animalia
- Phylum: Chordata
- Class: Chondrichthyes
- Subclass: Elasmobranchii
- Order: Myliobatiformes
- Family: Dasyatidae
- Genus: Brevitrygon
- Species: B. walga

Binomial name
- Brevitrygon walga (Müller & Henle, 1841)

Synonyms
- Himantura walga (Müller & Henle, 1841); Himantura heterurus (Bleeker, 1852); Himantura nuda (Günther, 1870); Himantura uylenburgi (Giltay, 1933); Trygon walga Müller & Henle, 1841

= Brevitrygon walga =

Dwarf whipray

Species of cartilaginous fish

Brevitrygon walga, the dwarf whipray or mangrove whipray, is a small stingray, a cartilaginous fish in the family Dasyatidae. It is a demersal fish and is found over the continental and insular shelf of the west central Pacific Ocean where it is heavily fished. The IUCN has assessed it as being "near-threatened".

== Description ==
The dwarf whipray has a maximum length of 45 cm (18 in). The disc width is commonly about 24 cm (9 in). In outline it is oval with a bluntly-pointed snout. The whip-like tail is longer than the body and lacks the skin fold found in some related species. Females have a shorter tail than males, with a bulbous tip, and both sexes have four to six erectile, venomous spines at the base of the tail. The dwarf whipray is a uniform pinkish or beige colour and has been mistaken for a horseshoe crab in turbid water.

== Distribution and habitat ==
The dwarf whipray is found in the western central Pacific Ocean. Its range extends from Thailand, Cambodia and Vietnam to Singapore, Malaysia, the Philippines and Indonesia. It has been recorded from India, but may have been confused there with the scaly whipray (Brevitrygon imbricata). It occurs close to the sandy seabed on the inner continental shelf at depths usually less than 50 m (164 ft).

== Biology ==
The dwarf whipray reaches maturity at a length of about 17 cm (7 in). Mating occurs when the male grasps the female with their ventral surfaces in contact. This fish is viviparous, giving birth to one or two young at a time. The gestation period is not known, but before birth, the pups are fed on secretions from the uterine wall, a process known as histotrophy.

== Use ==
The dwarf whipray is caught, largely as bycatch, over most of its wide range. Trawling for batoids is common in many places and trammel netting, in which the fish get entangled in the fine-meshed central net of a three-part net, is used over much of its range. The fish is used for human consumption, but is not specifically targeted, probably because of its small size.

== Status ==
The International Union for Conservation of Nature has assessed the conservation status of the dwarf whipray as being "near-threatened". The organisation considers the fish is experiencing intense fishing pressure over much of its range and is being over-exploited. Its abundance appears to be falling and the size of the fish caught also seems to be declining.
