= Kimberley grunter =

Conservation status
- Least Concern (IUCN 3.1)

Scientific classification
- Kingdom: Animalia
- Phylum: Chordata
- Class: Actinopterygii
- Order: Centrarchiformes
- Family: Terapontidae
- Genus: Syncomistes
- Species: S. kimberleyensis

Binomial name
- Syncomistes kimberleyensis Vari, 1978

Species of ray-finned fish

The Kimberley grunter (Syncomistes kimberleyensis) is a species of ray-finned fish in the family Terapontidae. It is endemic to Australia, where it lives in the coastal rivers of northern Western Australia. It is known from the Durack, Pentecost, and Bow Rivers of the Kimberley region.

It is a herbivorous fish that feeds in filamentous algae, and is found in rocky pools and on the edges of watercourses where there is aquatic vegetation over sandy and rocky substrates.
