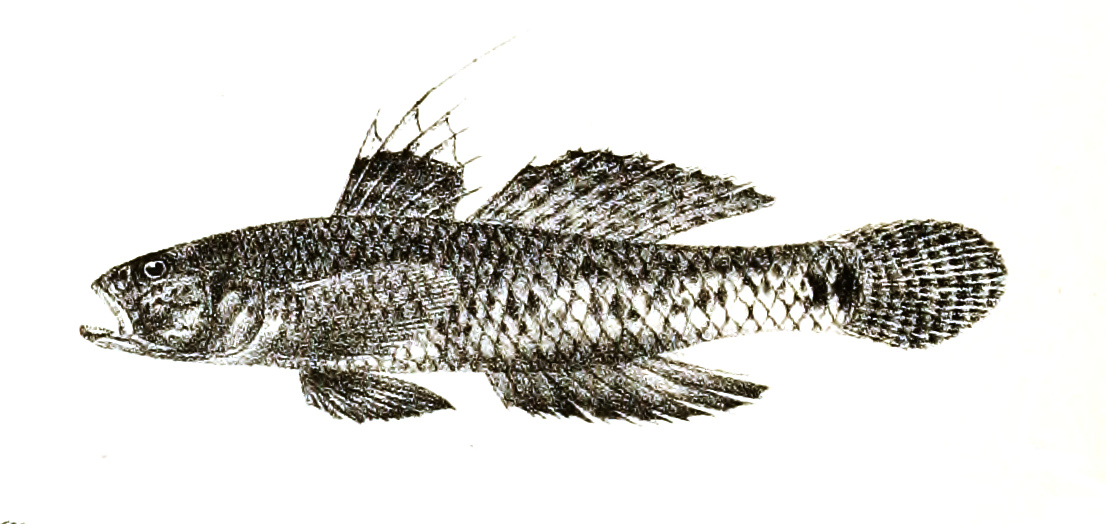

Conservation status
- Least Concern (IUCN 3.1)

Scientific classification
- Kingdom: Animalia
- Phylum: Chordata
- Class: Actinopterygii
- Order: Gobiiformes
- Family: Gobiidae
- Genus: Favonigobius
- Species: F. reichei

Binomial name
- Favonigobius reichei (Bleeker, 1854)

Synonyms
- Gobius reichei Bleeker, 1854; Acentrogobius reichei (Bleeker, 1854); Papillogobius reichei (Bleeker, 1854); Gobius neilli F. Day, 1868; Acentrogobius neilli (F. Day, 1868); Favonigobius neilli (F. Day, 1868); Gobius zanzibarensis H. E. Liénard, 1891; Rhinogobius robinsoni Fowler, 1934; Ctenogobius godavariensis Visweswara Rao, 1971

= Favonigobius reichei =

Species of fish

Favonigobius reichei, the Indopacific Tropical Sand Goby (often simply called "tropical sand goby" (all "sand gobies" are tropical)), is a species of goby native to fresh, brackish and marine waters of coastal areas of the Indian Ocean and the western Pacific Ocean preferring muddy or sandy substrates, often with weed growth. This species can reach a length of 8.3 centimetres (3.3 in) TL.
