= Oxynoemacheilus atili =

Conservation status
- Near Threatened (IUCN 3.1)

Scientific classification
- Kingdom: Animalia
- Phylum: Chordata
- Class: Actinopterygii
- Order: Cypriniformes
- Family: Nemacheilidae
- Genus: Oxynoemacheilus
- Species: O. atili

Binomial name
- Oxynoemacheilus atili Erk'akan, 2012

Species of fish

Oxynoemacheilus atili, the Lake Beyşehir loach, is a species of stone loach from the genus Oxynoemacheilus. It is endemic to Turkey being found only in the drainage basin of Lake Beyşehir in Central Anatolia, where it occurs in all the streams and in the Manavgat drainage in Mediterranean basin.

The fish is named in honor of Mr. Ahmet Tuncay Atil.
