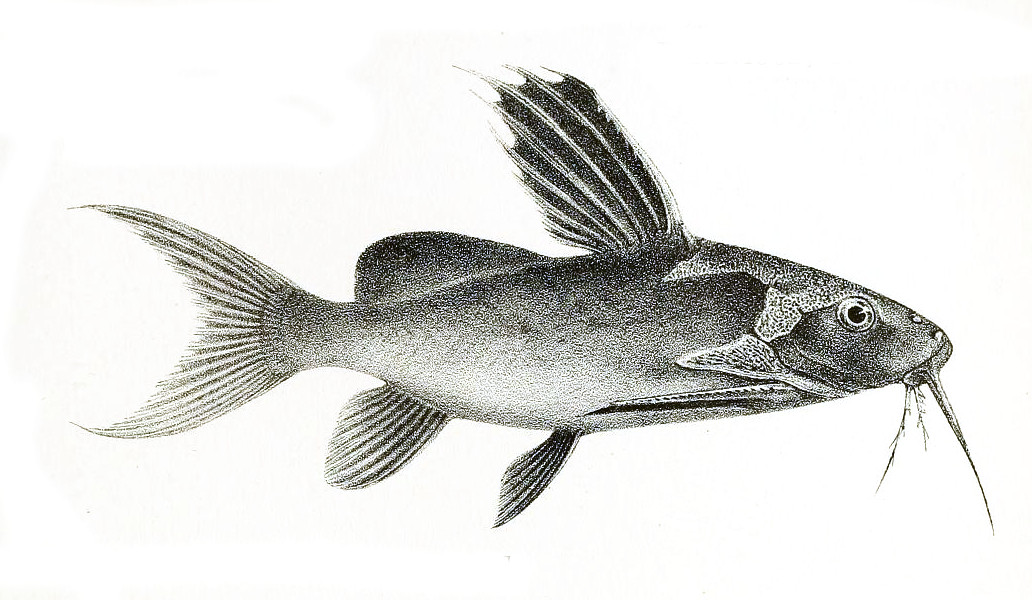

Conservation status
- Near Threatened (IUCN 3.1)

Scientific classification
- Kingdom: Animalia
- Phylum: Chordata
- Class: Actinopterygii
- Division: Teleostei
- Order: Siluriformes
- Family: Mochokidae
- Genus: Synodontis
- Species: S. melanopterus

Binomial name
- Synodontis melanopterus Boulenger, 1903

= Synodontis melanopterus =

Species of fish

Synodontis melanopterus is a species of upside-down catfish that is native to Benin, Niger and Nigeria where it is found at Porto-Novo and in the Ouémé, Niger and Ogun river basins. It was first described by Belgian-British zoologist George Albert Boulenger in 1903, from specimens collected at Oguta, Nigeria, in the Niger River delta.

== Description ==
Like all members of the genus Synodontis, S. melanopterus has a strong, bony head capsule that extends back as far as the first spine of the dorsal fin. The head contains a distinct narrow, bony, external protrusion called a humeral process. The shape and size of the humeral process helps to identify the species. In S. melanopterus, the humeral process is longer than it is broad, rough, with a slight ridge on the bottom edge, and ending in a blunt, serrated edge.

The fish has three pairs of barbels. The maxillary barbels are on located on the upper jaw, and two pairs of mandibular barbels are on the lower jaw. The maxillary barbel is long and straight without any branches, with a broad membrane at the base. It extends to a length of 1 to 1 1/3 times the length of the head. The outer pair of mandibular barbels is about twice the length of the inner pair, and both pairs have moderately long, simple branches, with secondary branches on the inner pair.

The front edges of the dorsal fins and the pectoral fins of Syntontis species are hardened into stiff spines. In S. melanopterus, the spine of the dorsal fin is as long as or slightly shorter than the head, smooth in the front and serrated on the back. The remaining portion of the dorsal fin is made up of seven branching rays. The spine of the pectoral fin about the same size as the dorsal spine, and serrated on both sides. The adipose fin is 3 1/2 times as long as it is deep. The anal fin contains three unbranched and eight branched rays. The tail, or caudal fin, is deeply forked.

All members of Syndontis have a structure called a premaxillary toothpad, which is located on the very front of the upper jaw of the mouth. This structure contains several rows of short, chisel-shaped teeth. In S. melanopterus, the toothpad forms a short and broad band. On the lower jaw, or mandible, the teeth of Syndontis are attached to flexible, stalk-like structures and described as "s-shaped" or "hooked". The number of teeth on the mandible is used to differentiate between species; in S. melanopterus, there are about 35 to 40 teeth on the mandible.

The base body color is dark brown, with dark brown or black fins. Juvenile fish may have some light cross-bands.

The maximum standard length of the species is 14.4 centimetres (5.7 in). Generally, females in the genus Synodontis tend to be slightly larger than males of the same age.

== Habitat and behavior ==
In the wild, the species has been found in the lower Niger River, and basins of the Ouémé River and Ogun River. Its habitat is threatened by oil exploration. The reproductive habits of most of the species of Synodontis are not known, beyond some instances of obtaining egg counts from gravid females. Spawning likely occurs during the flooding season between July and October, and pairs swim in unison during spawning. As a whole, species of Synodontis are omnivores, consuming insect larvae, algae, gastropods, bivalves, sponges, crustaceans, and the eggs of other fishes. The growth rate is rapid in the first year, then slows down as the fish age.
