= Garra vittatula =

Conservation status
- Near Threatened (IUCN 3.1)

Scientific classification
- Kingdom: Animalia
- Phylum: Chordata
- Class: Actinopterygii
- Order: Cypriniformes
- Family: Cyprinidae
- Subfamily: Labeoninae
- Genus: Garra
- Species: G. vittatula

Binomial name
- Garra vittatula S. O. Kullander & F. Fang, 2004

Species of fish

Garra vittatula is a species of ray-finned fish in the genus Garra from Myanmar.
