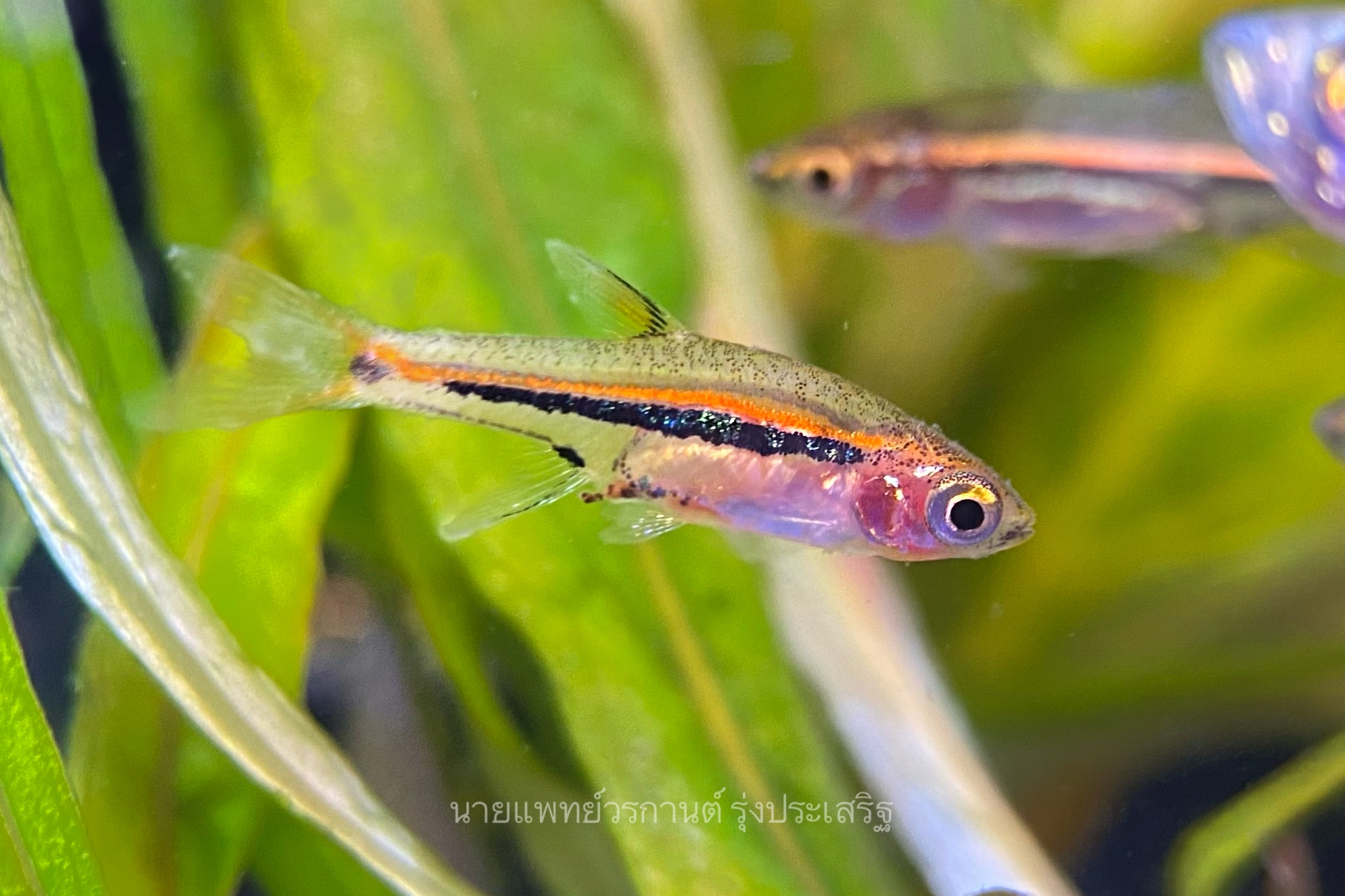

Conservation status
- Near Threatened (IUCN 3.1)

Scientific classification
- Kingdom: Animalia
- Phylum: Chordata
- Class: Actinopterygii
- Order: Cypriniformes
- Family: Danionidae
- Genus: Boraras
- Species: B. urophthalmoides

Binomial name
- Boraras urophthalmoides (Kottelat, 1991)

Synonyms
- Rasbora urophthalmoides Kottelat, 1991

= Least rasbora =

Species of fish

The least rasbora or exclamation point rasbora (Boraras urophthalmoides) is a species of ray-finned fish in the genus Boraras, native to freshwater habitats in mainland southeast Asia. This species is very small, ranging from 12 to 16 mm (0.47 to 0.63 in).
