= Synodontis tourei =

Conservation status
- Critically Endangered (IUCN 3.1)

Scientific classification
- Kingdom: Animalia
- Phylum: Chordata
- Class: Actinopterygii
- Order: Siluriformes
- Family: Mochokidae
- Genus: Synodontis
- Species: S. tourei

Binomial name
- Synodontis tourei Daget, 1962

Species of fish

Synodontis tourei is a species of upside-down catfish endemic to Guinea where it is found in the Bafing River. This species grows to a length of 10.5 centimetres (4.1 in) TL.
