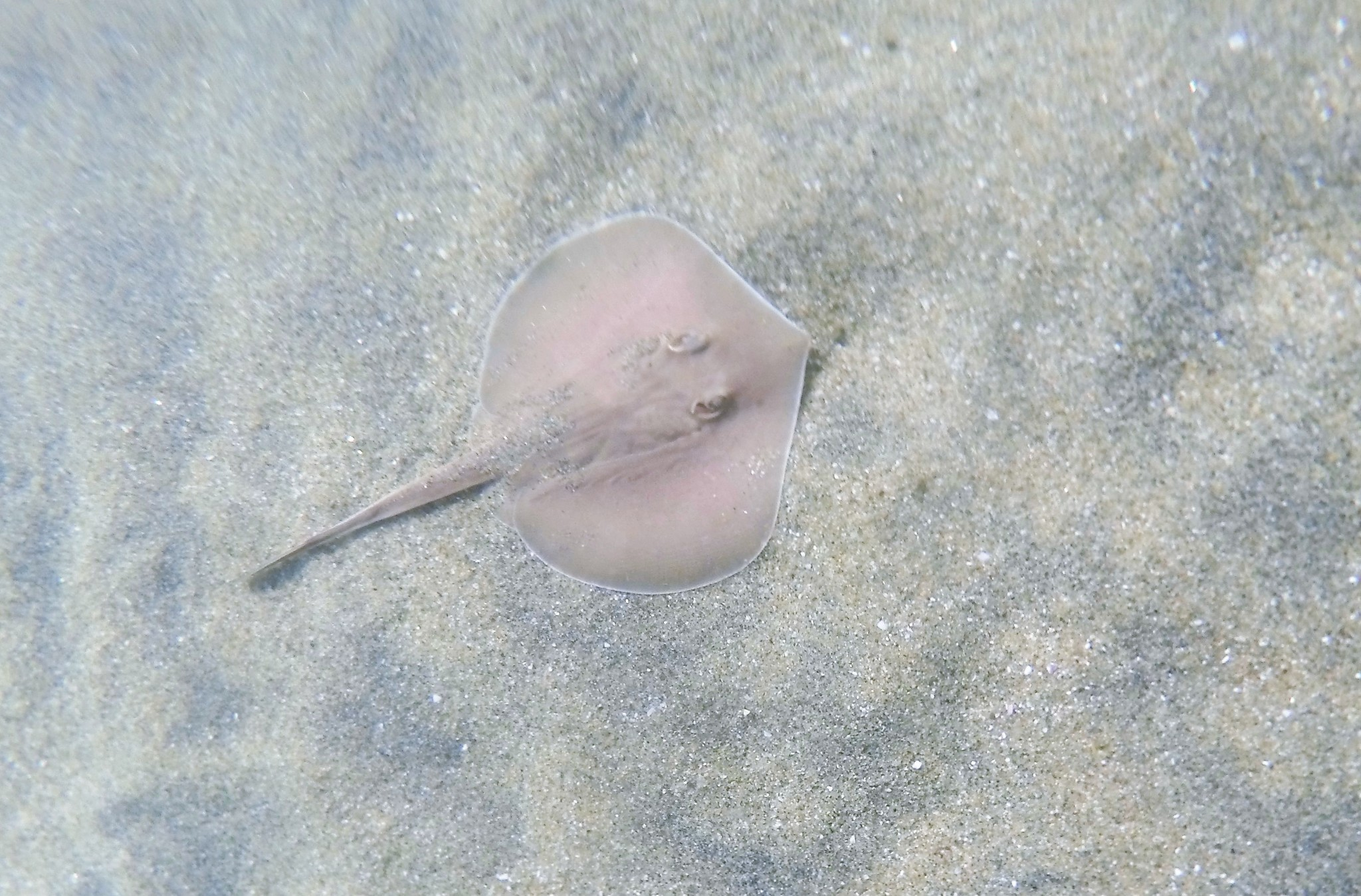

Conservation status
- Near Threatened (IUCN 3.1)

Scientific classification
- Kingdom: Animalia
- Phylum: Chordata
- Class: Chondrichthyes
- Subclass: Elasmobranchii
- Order: Myliobatiformes
- Family: Urotrygonidae
- Genus: Urotrygon
- Species: U. nana

Binomial name
- Urotrygon nana Miyake & McEachran, 1988

= Urotrygon nana =

Species of fish

Urotrygon nana, the dwarf round ray, is a type of marine tropical ray found in fragmented localities across the south coasts of Central America.

== Description ==
Not much is known of its biology, except the fact that it is a benthic ray with a venomous spine on its tail. This species can reach a maximum total length of 32 cm, even though the common length is just around 15 cm.

== Habitat & distribution ==
This stingray is found in the south coasts of Mexico, Guatemala, El Salvador, Honduras, Nicaragua, Costa Rica, and Panama. It inhabits very shallow inshore waters at depths of 2-15 m.
