= Grey threadfin sea-bass =

Conservation status
- Near Threatened (IUCN 3.1)

Scientific classification
- Kingdom: Animalia
- Phylum: Chordata
- Class: Actinopterygii
- Order: Perciformes
- Family: Serranidae
- Genus: Cratinus; Steindachner, 1878
- Species: C. agassizii

Binomial name
- Cratinus agassizii Steindachner, 1878

Species of fish

The grey threadfin sea-bass (Cratinus agassizii) is a species of marine ray finned fish which is a member of the subfamily Serraninae of the family Serranidae, which also includes the groupers and anthias. It is found in the eastern Pacific Ocean off Ecuador and northern Peru and in the Galapagos Islands.
