= Thoburnia hamiltoni =

Conservation status
- Near Threatened (IUCN 3.1)

- Vulnerable (NatureServe)

Scientific classification
- Kingdom: Animalia
- Phylum: Chordata
- Class: Actinopterygii
- Order: Cypriniformes
- Family: Catostomidae
- Genus: Thoburnia
- Species: T. hamiltoni

Binomial name
- Thoburnia hamiltoni Raney & Lachner, 1946

Synonyms
- Moxostoma hamiltoni (Raney & Lachner, 1946)

Species of fish

Thoburnia hamiltoni (rustyside sucker) is a species of ray-finned fish in the family Catostomidae. It is found only in Virginia and North Carolina in the United States.
