= Urotrygon munda =

Conservation status
- Near Threatened (IUCN 3.1)

Scientific classification
- Kingdom: Animalia
- Phylum: Chordata
- Class: Chondrichthyes
- Subclass: Elasmobranchii
- Order: Myliobatiformes
- Family: Urotrygonidae
- Genus: Urotrygon
- Species: U. munda

Binomial name
- Urotrygon munda Gill, 1863

Urotrygon munda, the Munda round ray, is a type of marine tropical ray found scattered across the south coasts of Central America and some countries of South America.

== Description ==
Not much is known of its biology. Its reproduction is viviparous and it mostly feeds on crustaceans. This species can reach a maximum total length of 28 cm, with the male specimens usually grow to around 20 cm total length (TL) in average.

== Habitat & distribution ==
This stingray is found in the south coastal regions of Mexico, Guatemala, Honduras, El Salvador, Nicaragua, Costa Rica, Panama, Colombia, Ecuador; and Peru. It inhabits soft substrates in shallow waters and continental shelves at the depths of 5-50 m.
