= Drysdale grunter =

Conservation status
- Endangered (IUCN 3.1)

Scientific classification
- Kingdom: Animalia
- Phylum: Chordata
- Class: Actinopterygii
- Order: Centrarchiformes
- Family: Terapontidae
- Genus: Syncomistes
- Species: S. rastellus

Binomial name
- Syncomistes rastellus Vari & Hutchins, 1978

Species of ray-finned fish

The Drysdale grunter (Syncomistes rastellus) is a species of ray-finned fish in the family Terapontidae. It is endemic to Australia, where it occurs in the Gibb and Drysdale Rivers, coastal rivers in northern Western Australia. It is a herbivorous species which grazes on filamentous algae and prefers the main river channels rather than the tributaries, it also prefers flowing water of varying turbidity and substrate.
