= Enteromius deserti =

Conservation status
- Near Threatened (IUCN 3.1)

Scientific classification
- Domain: Eukaryota
- Kingdom: Animalia
- Phylum: Chordata
- Class: Actinopterygii
- Order: Cypriniformes
- Family: Cyprinidae
- Subfamily: Smiliogastrinae
- Genus: Enteromius
- Species: E. deserti

Binomial name
- Enteromius deserti (Pellegrin, 1909)

Synonyms
- Barbus deserti Pellegrin, 1909

Species of fish

Enteromius deserti is a species of ray-finned fish in the genus Enteromius. It is found in permanent, spring fed oases and their associated temporary flows in wadis in the Tassili and Ahaggar mountains in southern Algeria. It formerly occurred in the Tibesti Mountains in southern Libya, but it is believed to have since been extirpated from there.

== Footnotes ==
- Froese, Rainer; Pauly, Daniel (eds.). "Enteromius deserti". FishBase.
