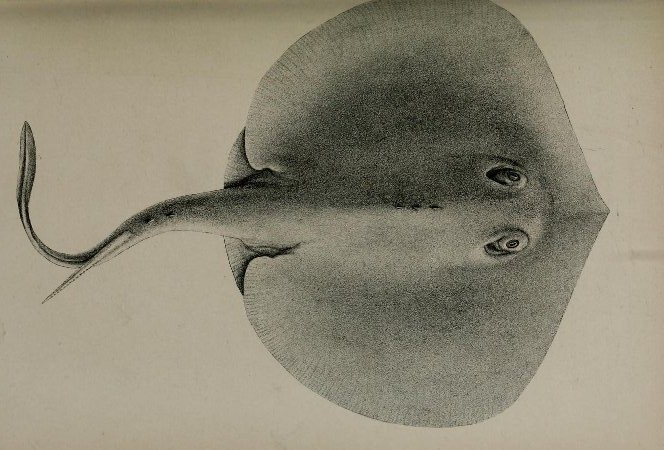

Conservation status
- Near Threatened (IUCN 3.1)

Scientific classification
- Kingdom: Animalia
- Phylum: Chordata
- Class: Chondrichthyes
- Subclass: Elasmobranchii
- Order: Myliobatiformes
- Family: Urotrygonidae
- Genus: Urotrygon
- Species: U. chilensis

Binomial name
- Urotrygon chilensis (Günther, 1872)

= Chilean round ray =

Thorny round stingray

Species of fish

The thorny round stingray (Urotrygon chilensis), also known as the Chilean or blotched stingray, is a species of fish in the family Urotrygonidae. It is found in Chile, Colombia, Costa Rica, Ecuador, El Salvador, Guatemala, Honduras, Mexico, Nicaragua, Panama and Peru. Its natural habitat is open seas.
