= Favonigobius melanobranchus =

Conservation status
- Near Threatened (IUCN 2.3)

Scientific classification
- Kingdom: Animalia
- Phylum: Chordata
- Class: Actinopterygii
- Order: Gobiiformes
- Family: Gobiidae
- Genus: Favonigobius
- Species: F. melanobranchus

Binomial name
- Favonigobius melanobranchus (Fowler, 1934)

Synonyms
- Rhinogobius melanobranchus Fowler, 1934; Papillogobius melanobranchus (Fowler, 1934)

Species of fish

Favonigobius melanobranchus, the blackthroat goby, is a species of goby native to the Indian Ocean and the western Pacific Ocean as well as being recorded in the Mediterranean Sea. This fish is found on sandy bottoms and seagrass beds at depths of from 0 to 5 metres (0 to 16 ft). It can reach a length of 5.5 centimetres (2.2 in) TL.
