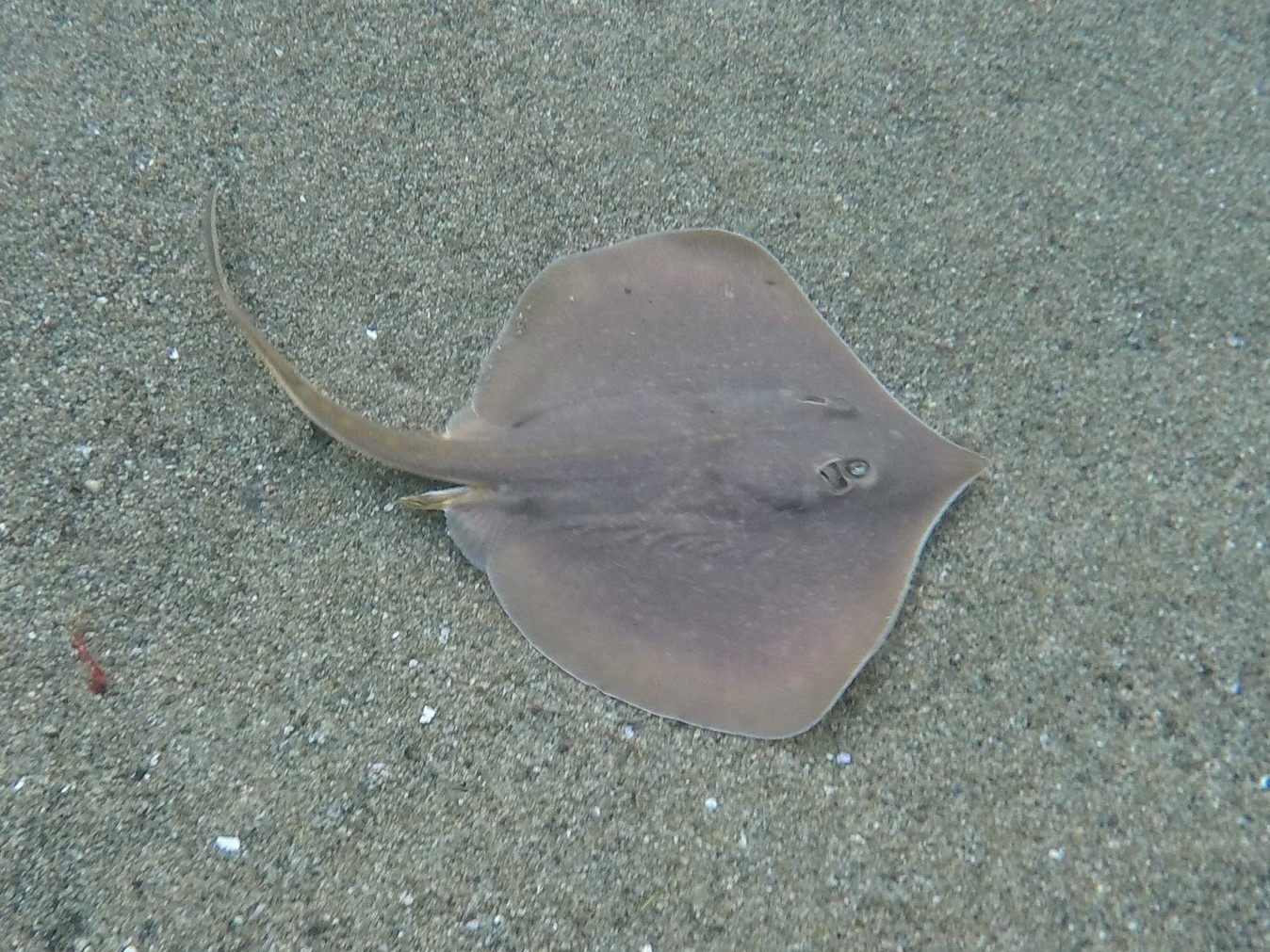

Conservation status
- Near Threatened (IUCN 3.1)

Scientific classification
- Kingdom: Animalia
- Phylum: Chordata
- Class: Chondrichthyes
- Subclass: Elasmobranchii
- Order: Myliobatiformes
- Family: Urotrygonidae
- Genus: Urotrygon
- Species: U. aspidura

Binomial name
- Urotrygon aspidura D. S. Jordan & C. H. Gilbert, 1882

= Urotrygon aspidura =

Species of cartilaginous fish

Urotrygon aspidura, also known as the spiny-tail round ray or Panamic stingray, is a species of stingray native to the eastern-central and south-eastern Pacific, southern Baja, and the Gulf of California. It can grow up to 42 cm. They are severely threatened by shrimp fisheries.

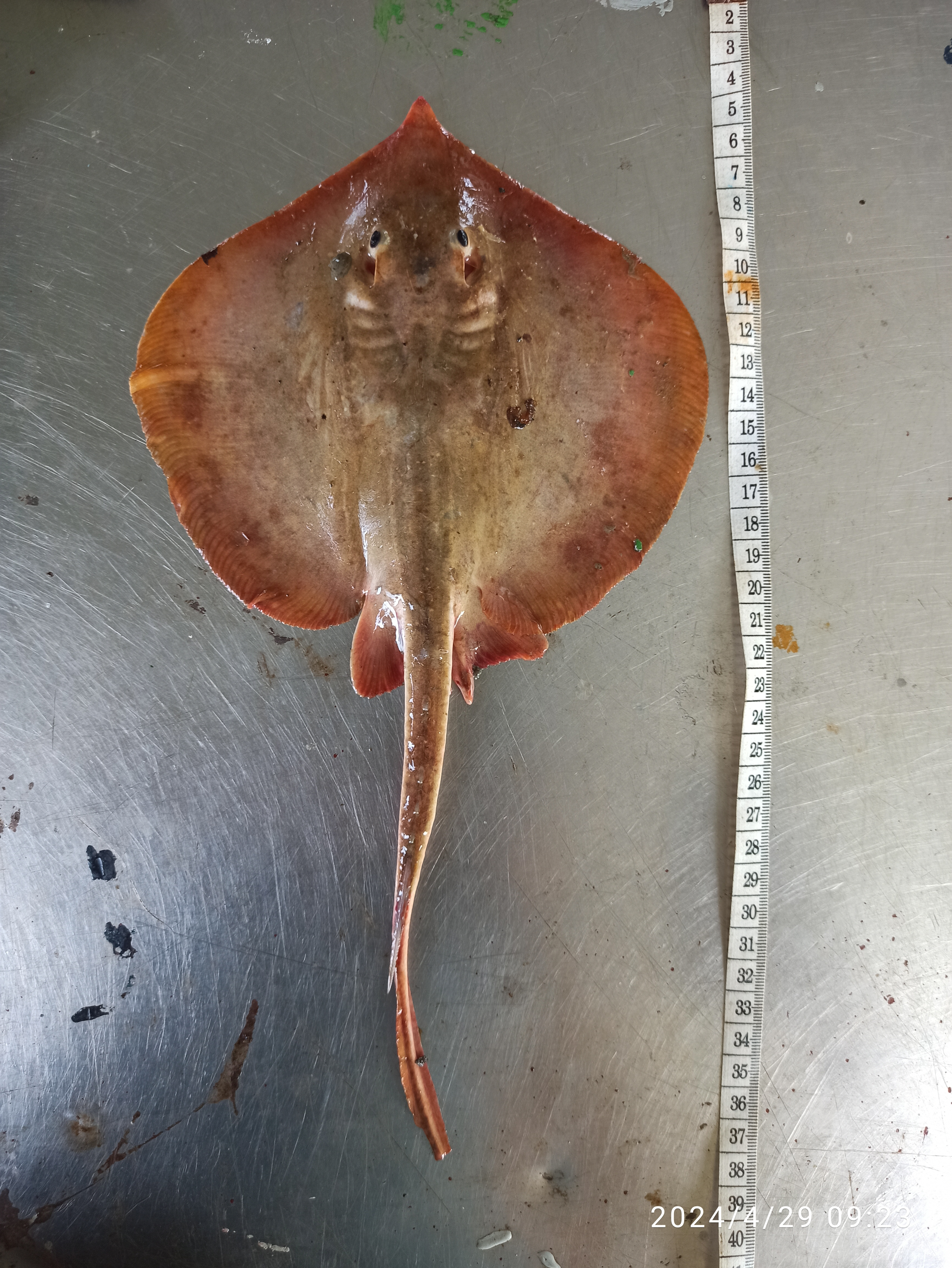
Urotrygon aspidura
