= Blackfin sucker =

Conservation status
- Near Threatened (IUCN 3.1)

- Vulnerable (NatureServe)

Scientific classification
- Kingdom: Animalia
- Phylum: Chordata
- Class: Actinopterygii
- Division: Teleostei
- Order: Cypriniformes
- Family: Catostomidae
- Subfamily: Catostominae
- Genus: Vexillichthys; Armbruster, 2024
- Species: V. atripinnis

Binomial name
- Vexillichthys atripinnis (R. M. Bailey, 1959)

Synonyms
- Thoburnia atripinnis

Species of fish

The blackfin sucker (Vexillichthys atripinnis) is a species of ray-finned fish in the family Catostomidae. It is the only species in the genus Vexillichthys. It is found only in the United States in the headwaters of the Barren River system in south central Kentucky and Tennessee.

Prior to 2025, it was placed in the genus Thoburnia. However, a phylogenetic analysis found it to actually comprise a distinct lineage sister to the hogsuckers (genus Hypentelium), and it was thus placed in its own genus, Vexillichthys. The genus was named after the Latin word vexillum (meaning "flag"), referencing the distinctive pattern of approximately 13 horizontal light & dark stripes on adults, which resembles the American flag.
