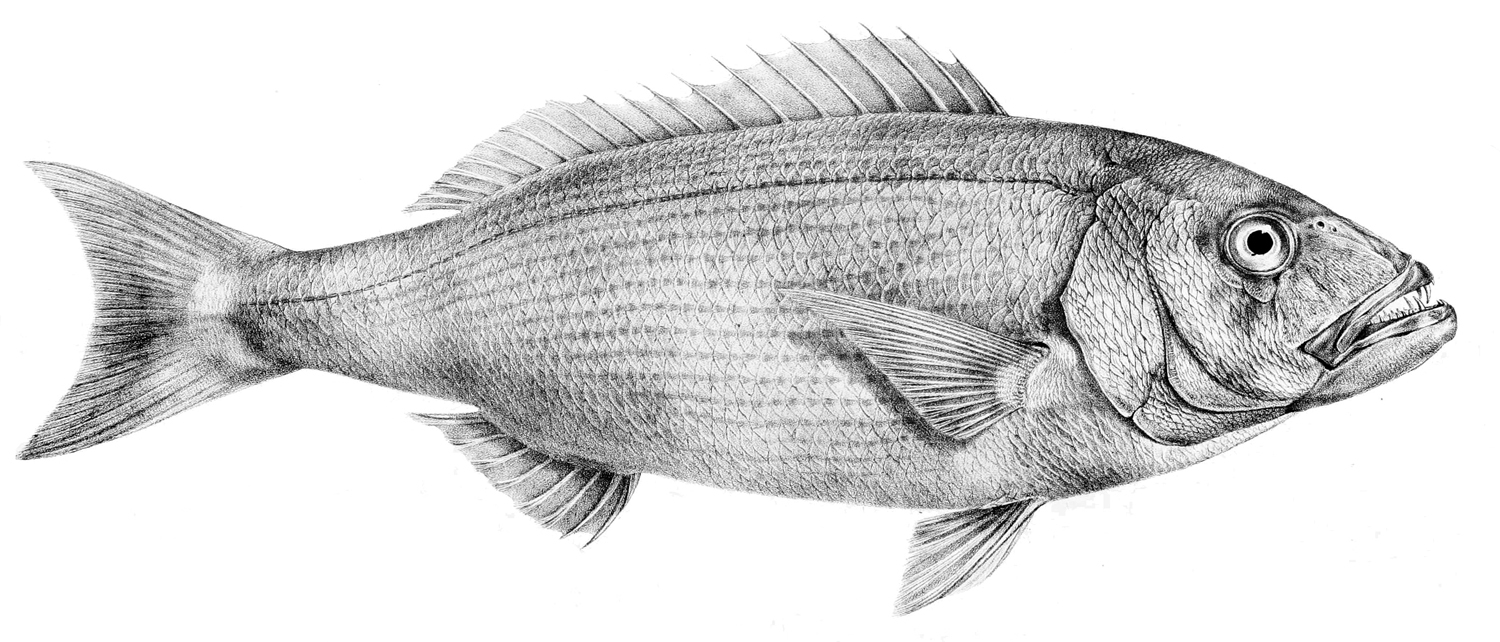

Conservation status
- Least Concern (IUCN 3.1)

Scientific classification
- Kingdom: Animalia
- Phylum: Chordata
- Class: Actinopterygii
- Division: Teleostei
- Order: Acanthuriformes
- Family: Sparidae
- Genus: Argyrozona; J. L. B. Smith, 1938
- Species: A. argyrozona

Binomial name
- Argyrozona argyrozona (Valenciennes, 1830)

Synonyms
- Dentex argyrozona Valenciennes, 1830; Polysteganus argyrozona (Valenciennes, 1830)

= Argyrozona =

Species of marine ray-finned fish

Argyrozona is a monospecific genus of marine ray-finned fish belonging to the family Sparidae, the seabreams and progies. Its only species is Argyrozona argyrozona, the carpenter seabream or doppie, which is endemic to the waters off southern South Africa.

== Taxonomy ==
Argyrozona was first proposed as a monospecific genus in 1938 by the South African ichthyologist James Leonard Brierley Smith. The only species in the genus was Dentex argyrozona, which had been first formally described in 1830 by the French zoologist Achille Valenciennes who gave its type locality as the Cape of Good Hope in South Africa. This taxon is placed in the family Sparidae within the order Spariformes by the 5th edition of Fishes of the World. Some authorities classify this genus in the subfamily Denticinae, but the 5th edition of Fishes of the World does not recognise subfamilies within the Sparidae.

== Etymology ==
Argyrozona is a tautonym of Dentex argyrozona. The specific name argyrozona means "silver band" and, according to J. L. B. Smith, is an allusion to the 5 or 6 white horizontal bands with gold and silver tints that appear immediately following death.

== Description ==
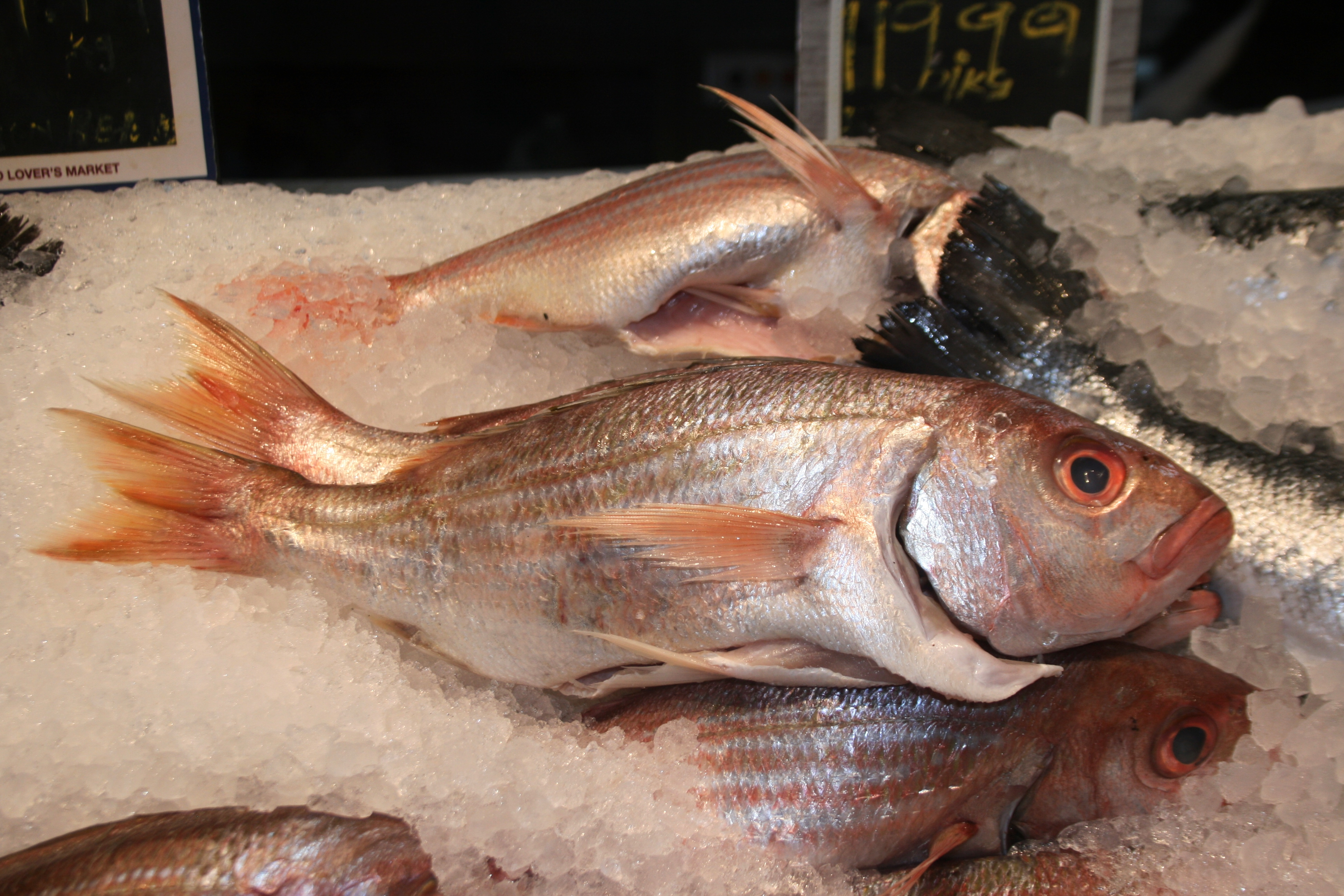
For sale at a fish market in Pretoria

Argyrozona has a torpedo-shaped body with its depth being slightly less than the length of the head, the head having a smooth profile. The lower jaw is slightly protruding with the posterior end of the maxilla not being covered by any other bone. The rear pair of nostrils are almost circular in shape. The dorsal fin is supported by 12 spines and 10 or 11 soft rays while the anal fin contains 3 spines and 8 soft rays. It has a silvery body tinted with reddish hues, paler on the lower body. There are a number of red horizontal lines along the flanks with silver between them appearing soon after death. The fins are pink and the eyes are orange-red. The carpenter seabream has a maximum published total length of 90 cm (35 in) but 60 cm (24 in) is more typical.

== Distribution and habitat ==
Argyrozona is found in the Western Indian Ocean where it is endemic to the waters off South Africa between Table Bay and the mouth of the Kei River, it is uncommon as far north as KwaZulu-Natal. The adults are found at depths between 50 and 200 m (160 and 660 ft) over rough reefs while juveniles are found in shallower water and migrate to deeper waters offshore as they mature.

== Biology ==
Agryrozona are mainly resident as adults, although a small percentage of fish have been found to move more than 100 km (62 mi) in tagging studies. The main prey of adults are squid, anchovies and sardines while the juveniles feed on crabs, crab larvae, amphipods and polychaetes. The carpenter bream is a gonochorist and they are group spawners, spawning in batches. Spawning takes place in the southern Spring and the eggs and larvae are pelagic. The juveniles gather in nursery areas inshore of the Agulhas Current. Nurseries of this species have been found in Algoa Bay and on the central Agulhas Bank.

== Fisheries and conservation ==
Argyrozona is an important species to commercial fisheries which catch it using long lines and trawls. The assessments of the population undertaken between 1986 and 2001 indicated that this fish was being overfished. The commercial fishing effort reduced from 2003 and indications from then is that the stock underwent some recovery from then.
