= Arrow darter =

Conservation status
- Near Threatened (IUCN 3.1)

Scientific classification
- Kingdom: Animalia
- Phylum: Chordata
- Class: Actinopterygii
- Division: Teleostei
- Order: Perciformes
- Family: Percidae
- Subfamily: Etheostomatinae
- Genus: Etheostoma
- Species: E. sagitta

Binomial name
- Etheostoma sagitta (D. S. Jordan & Swain, 1883)

Synonyms
- Poecilichthys sagitta D. S. Jordan & Swain, 1883; Etheostoma sagitta sagitta (D. S. Jordan & Swain, 1883)

Species of fish

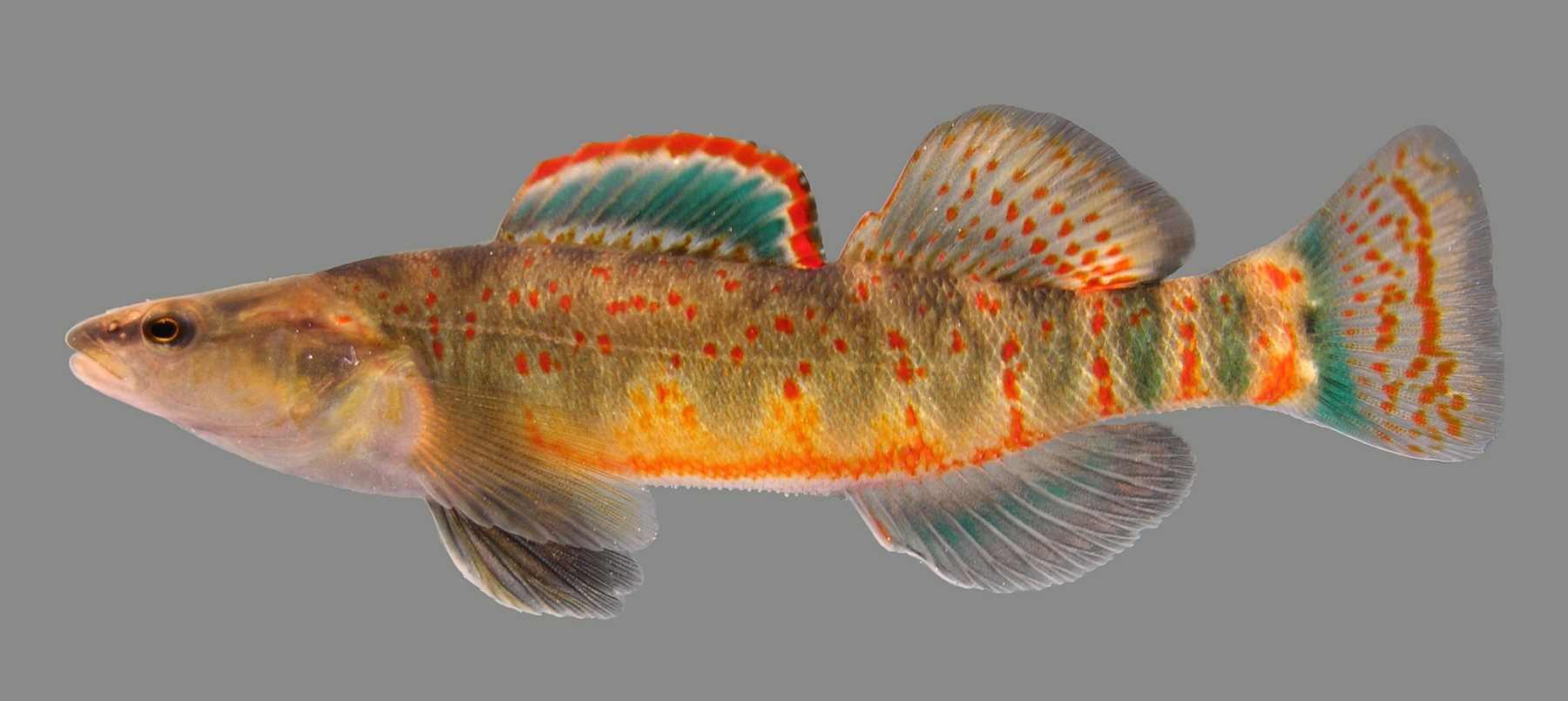
Kentucky arrow darter

The arrow darter (Etheostoma sagitta) is a species of freshwater ray-finned fish, a darter from the subfamily Etheostomatinae, part of the family Percidae, which also contains the perches, ruffes and pikeperches. It is found in parts of Kentucky and Tennessee, particularly in the Cumberland and Kentucky Rivers. These small fish are part of the perch family. They grow to be about 4.5 inches (11 cm) in length. Their opercle, breast, and cheek are all unscaled. They have a vertical black bar at the base of their caudal fin. Six to nine vertical banded bars run down the side of the fish. The dorsal side of the fish is olive green in color, and the ventral side is a yellow to white pattern. The first dorsal fin has a black base, followed by green color, and then a reddish-orange end. The second dorsal is clear with two rows of laterally lined orange spots. The caudal fin is clear and has two-three vertical lines of orange spots. The anal fin has a green base and then clear at the end. The breeding male has bright orange-red spots and breeding tubercles present on the scales.

== Diet ==
Arrow darters usually feed on insect larvae, such as blackflies, caddisfly, and beetles. They also frequently feed on mayflies and midges. If the darter is greater than 2.8 inches (7.1 cm), they often feed on small crayfish.

== Habitat ==
Arrow darters are often found in shallow pools of water near large, flat stones. The streams they are found in are so small they are sometimes reduced to puddles. They can be found around wooded debris and rock ledges.

== Reproduction and life cycle ==
Little is known about the reproduction of the arrow darter. In the book, Handbook of Darters by Lawrence Page, pregnant females have been found by a scientist, Bailey, in April. It is probable that spawning occurs from April to May.

== Distribution ==
The arrow darter is found in the rivers and streams spanning Kentucky and Tennessee. This species was found in at least 74 streams in the upper Kentucky River basin. However, surveys have tested and populations of the arrow darter can be found in 47 streams across the same region.

== Importance to humans ==
The arrow darter species is being poisoned by humans mining for coal. The pollution caused by the runoff of explosions is detrimental to the health of the streams nearby, and all those who live in them. The arrow darter is not on the endangered species list yet, but it has been wiped out from more than half of its regions. Protecting the species and the habitat it lives in will protect the drinking water for humans by preserving headwater streams. Polluted streams from coal runoff has been linked to increases of cancer and birth defects in humans. Therefore, it is important to keep the headwater streams from being polluted. This would impact human health and preserve the wildlife and habitats at the same time.

== Etymology ==
Scientific Name: Etheostoma sagitta – Etheostoma: Greek, etheo = to strain + Greek, stoma = mouth; Latin, sagitta: the specific epithet sagitta means arrow.
