= Round ray =

Round ray may refer to a variety of ray fish:

- Family Urotrygonidae (American round stingrays)
- Family Urolophidae (round stingrays)
- Heliotrygon genus
- Urotrygon genus
- Rajella fyllae (round ray, round skate)
- Taeniurops meyeni (round ribbontail ray)
- Urobatis halleri (Haller's round ray, little round stingray)
- Urobatis maculatus (leopard round stingray)
- Urobatis pardalis (Haller's round ray, little round stingray)
