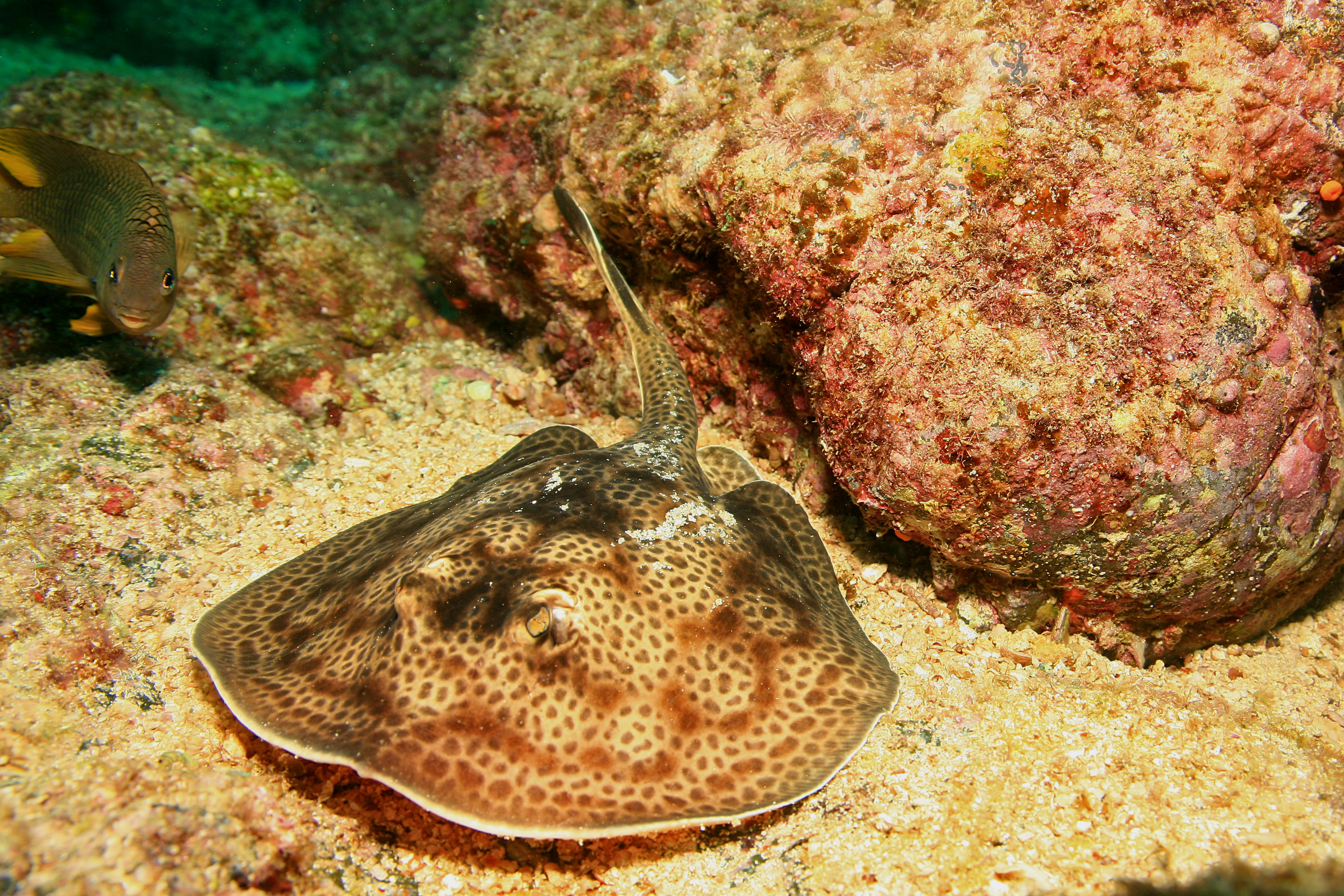

Scientific classification
- Kingdom: Animalia
- Phylum: Chordata
- Class: Chondrichthyes
- Subclass: Elasmobranchii
- Order: Myliobatiformes
- Family: Urotrygonidae
- Genus: Urobatis
- Species: U. pardalis

Binomial name
- Urobatis pardalis Del-Moral-Flores, Angulo, M. I. Bussing, & W. A. Bussing, 2015

= Leopard round stingray =

Species of cartilaginous fish

The leopard round stingray (Urobatis pardalis) or Central American round stingray and Costa Rican round stingray is a small species of round ray found in shallow waters off the coast from Costa Rica to Colombia in the eastern Pacific Ocean.

== Taxonomy ==
The species name, pardalis, is from the leopard round stingray's dorsal patterning which resembles that of a leopard.

== Distribution and habitat ==
This species is endemic to the Tropical Eastern Pacific, from Costa Rica to Colombia. They can be observed from the intertidal zone to a depth of around 20 m (65.6 ft) inhabiting reefs, seagrass meadows, and sandy areas on continental shelves.

== Description ==
The leopard round stingray has a circular body disc with a dorsum that lacks tubercles. Its dorsum also possesses a grayish or tan base coloration, dusky patches that usually form a honeycomb pattern, and small, and dark spots that vary in size. The ray's thick tail (which is shorter than its disc) is armed with a venomous tail spine. The average proportions for an adult ray is around 38 cm (15.0 in) or 25 cm (9.8 in) in total length and the maximum size is around 30 cm (11.8 in) in width and 46 cm (18.1 in) in total length with a weight of around 800 g (1.8 lb). At birth, they are around 12 cm (4.7 in) in total length and at Sexual maturity, around 18 cm (7.1 in) in width and 28 cm (11.0 in) in total length.

== Biology and ecology ==
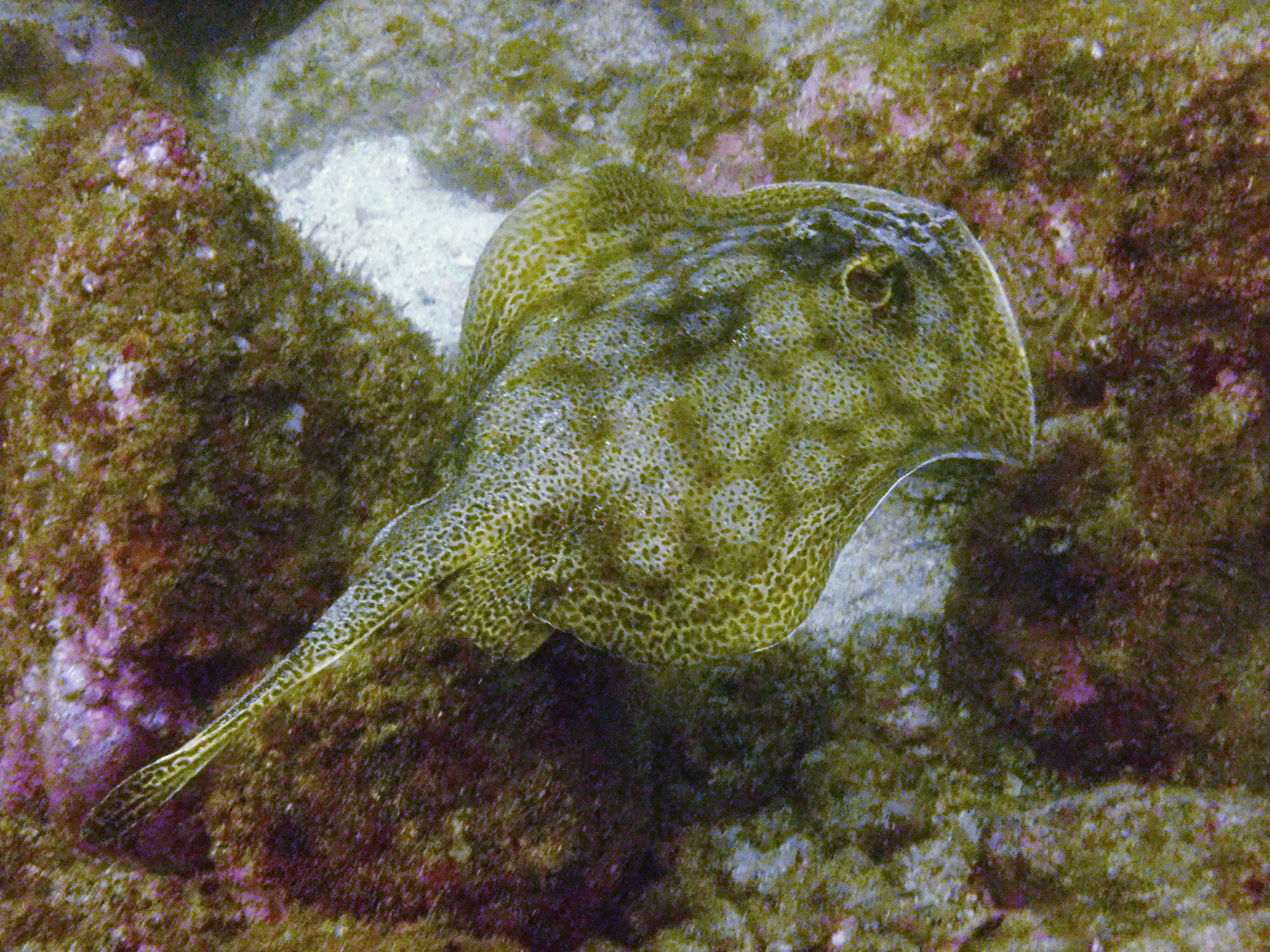
A Leopard round stingray (Urobatis pardalis) swimming in Costa Rica.

This abundant, benthopelagic ray is probably nocturnal and is observed staying stationary during the day on reefs. It is also ovoviviparous and takes 2 to 3 years to reach Sexual maturity, growing at a rate of about 2.8 cm (1.1 in) in width and 4.8 cm (1.9 in) in total length a year. The ray's diet consists of shrimp, small crabs and fish, and worms and it has a lifespan of 8 to 12 years.

== Relationship to humans ==
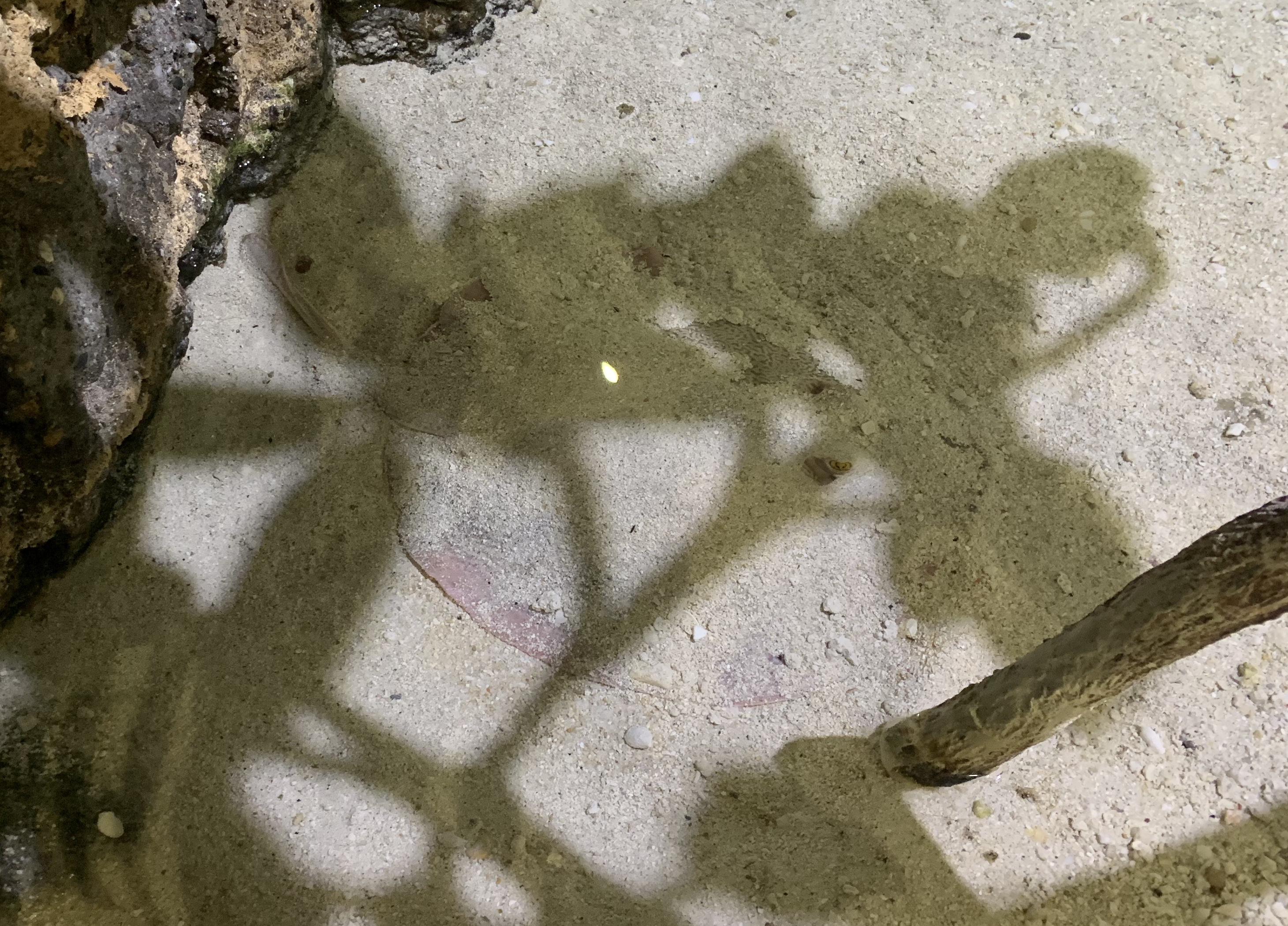
A Leopard round stingray (Urobatis pardalis) resting under a layer of sand at the Point Defiance Zoo and Aquarium in Tacoma, Washington.

The leopard round stingray is fairly harmless, yet it does pose danger to humans given its venomous tail spine. Despite this, they make their way into the aquarium trade. They are probably quite hardy in captivity although a single ray requires a minimum 200-gallon aquarium with abundant swimming room and heavy filtration. Divers are able to easily approach them in the wild if they stay calm and move slowly. The leopard round stingray may be misidentified as the Round stingray (Urobatis halleri) which has smaller spots that are generally the same size. It could potentially be more plentiful than the leopard round stingray as well. The Cortez round stingray (Urobatis maculatus) may also be misidentified as the leopard round stingray.
