= Chilean round stingray =

Conservation status
- Data Deficient (IUCN 3.1)

Scientific classification
- Kingdom: Animalia
- Phylum: Chordata
- Class: Chondrichthyes
- Subclass: Elasmobranchii
- Order: Myliobatiformes
- Family: Urotrygonidae
- Genus: Urobatis
- Species: U. marmoratus

Binomial name
- Urobatis marmoratus (Philippi {Krumweide}, 1893)

Synonyms
- Urolophus marmoratus Philippi, 1893

Species of cartilaginous fish

The Chilean round stingray (Urobatis marmoratus), is a species of round ray, family Urolophidae. Virtually nothing is known about it, as it is only known from a single specimen described by Rodolfo Amando Philippi in 1893. The specimen measured 38.5 cm long and was collected off Quintero, Chile. It had the nearly circular pectoral fin disc typical of the round rays, with the front margins straight. The distance between the eyes was more than two-thirds the distance between the eyes and the tip of the snout. The body was very thick for a ray, and completely smooth. The tail was shorter than the length of the disc. The coloration was distinctive, consisting of numerous small white spots on a dark background. It is likely benthic.
