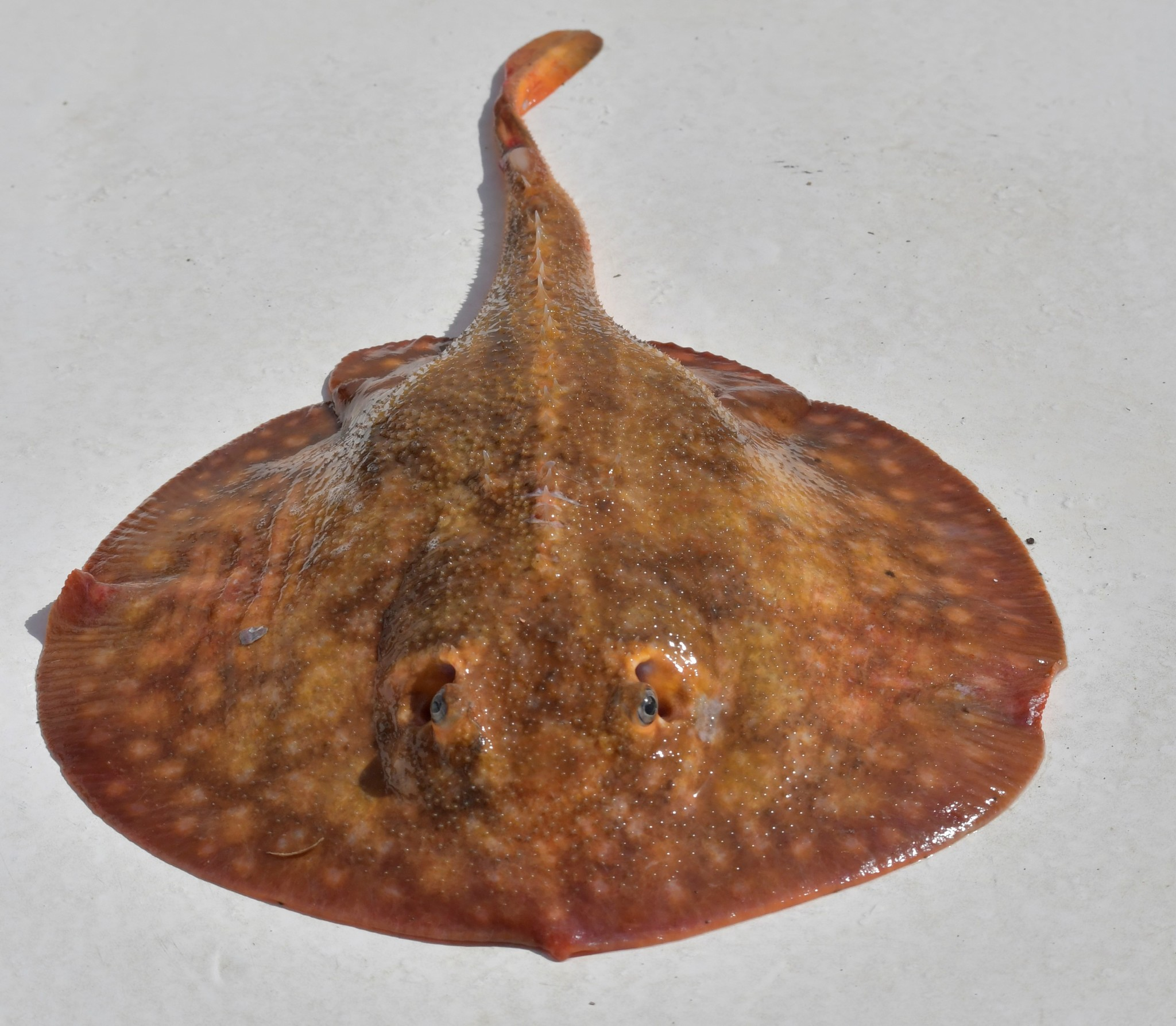

Conservation status
- Vulnerable (IUCN 3.1)

Scientific classification
- Kingdom: Animalia
- Phylum: Chordata
- Class: Chondrichthyes
- Subclass: Elasmobranchii
- Order: Myliobatiformes
- Family: Urotrygonidae
- Genus: Urobatis
- Species: U. tumbesensis

Binomial name
- Urobatis tumbesensis (Chirichigno F. & McEachran, 1979)

Synonyms
- Urolophus tumbesensis Chirichigno F. & McEachran, 1979

= Tumbes round stingray =

Species of cartilaginous fish

The Tumbes round stingray (Urobatis tumbesensis) is a little-known species of round ray, family Urolophidae, known only from two immature male specimens collected from estuarine waters at depths of 1–2 m, and a third specimen collected in 2006 near mangroves. Its range appears to be limited to coastal waters off Tumbes in northern Peru, where it is found partially buried in sand or mud. The larger of the original two specimens measured 40.4 cm long and the smaller 15.7 cm.

Like other round rays, the Tumbes round stingray has a rounded pectoral fin disc, slightly wider than it is long. The tail is stout, bearing a serrated stinging spine, and terminates in a rounded caudal fin. The pelvic fins have abruptly rounded tips. The teeth have narrowly oval bases and no elevated cusps. The dorsal surface is covered uniformly by dermal denticles on stellate bases, becoming larger towards the midline of the disc; the underside is smooth. There are also thorns on the dorsal surface of the disc and tail. The dorsal coloration consists of ochre vermiculations separating brownish-white oval or circular spots about the size of the eye, becoming more distinct towards the margin of the disc and on the pelvic fins. The denticles and tail spine are ochre-colored, and the underside is light tan with a dark border along the edge of the disc. The coloration, denticles and several proportional measurements distinguish the Tumbes round stingray from other Urobatis species.

Due to its highly restricted distribution and shallow inshore habitat, this species merits conservation concern. Information is needed on whether this species is being affected by fisheries activities in its range.
