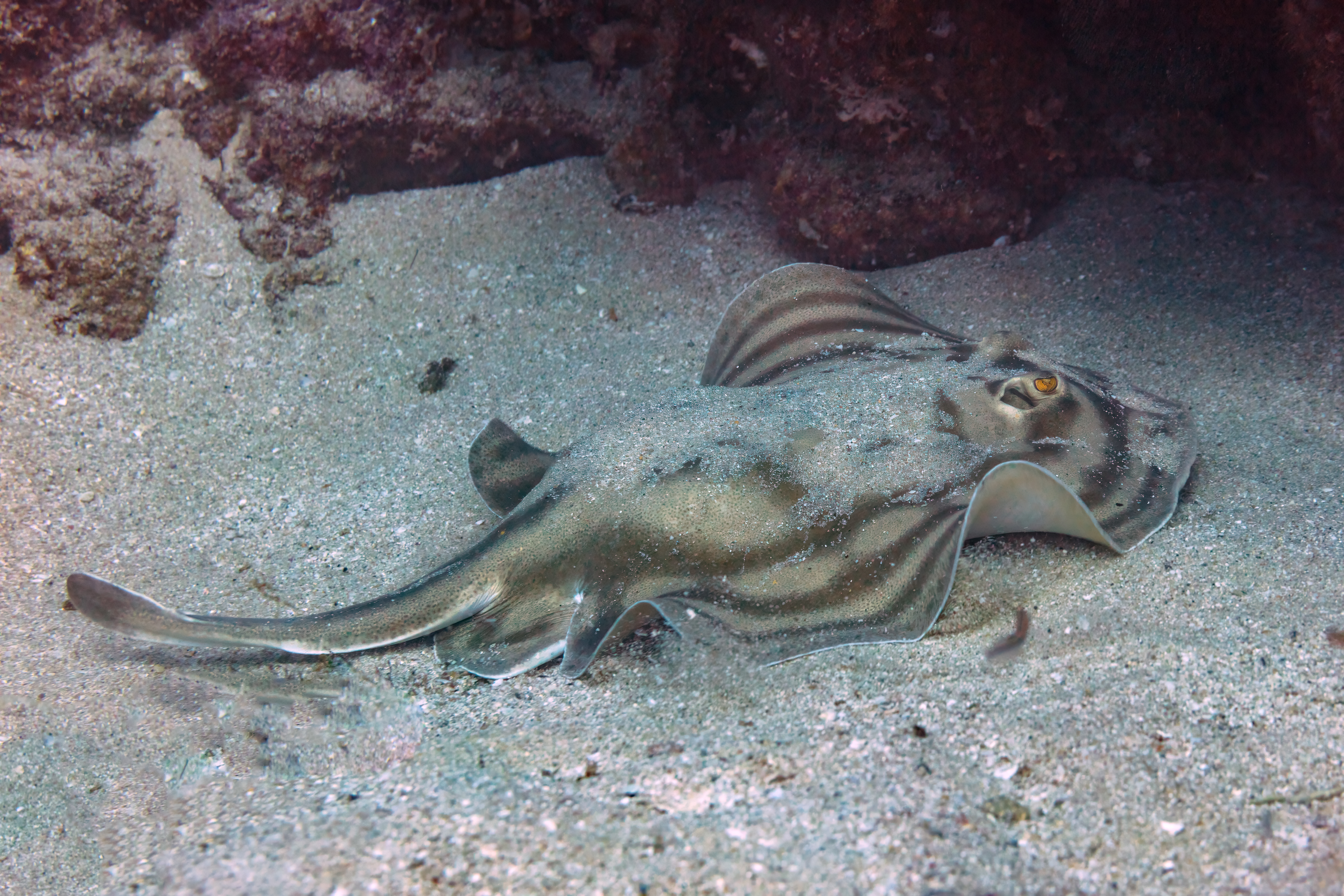

Conservation status
- Least Concern (IUCN 3.1)

Scientific classification
- Kingdom: Animalia
- Phylum: Chordata
- Class: Chondrichthyes
- Subclass: Elasmobranchii
- Order: Myliobatiformes
- Family: Urotrygonidae
- Genus: Urobatis
- Species: U. concentricus

Binomial name
- Urobatis concentricus R. C. Osburn & Nichols, 1916

= Bullseye round stingray =

Species of cartilaginous fish

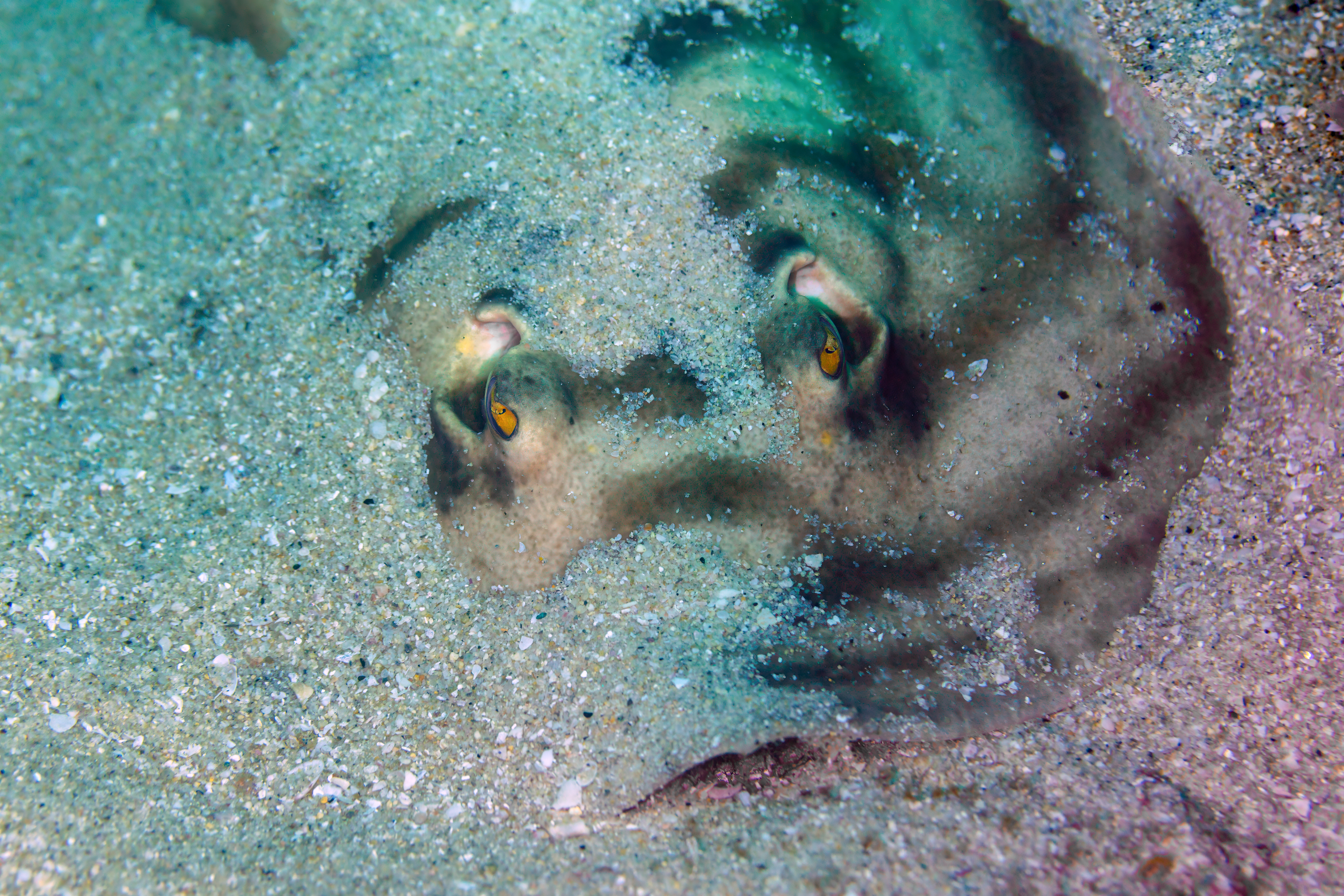
Bullseye round stingray off Cabo Pulmo, Mexico

The bullseye round stingray (Urobatis concentricus), also known as the reticulated round ray, or spot-on-spot round ray, is a species of cartilaginous fish in the family Urotrygonidae. It is endemic to Mexico. Its natural habitats are shallow seas, subtidal aquatic beds, coral reefs, estuarine waters, intertidal marshes, and coastal saline lagoons. It is threatened by habitat loss.

== Description ==
Urobatis concentricus can be characterized by a light brown dorsal region with whitish spots or patches around the pectoral fins and dorsum. They are separated from other Urobatis species by their pupillary operculum used to cover their eye, and their two dark lines presented in concentric rows. The bullseye stingray is venomous, as their tail contains a spine normally around 27 - 30 mm in length.

== Feeding Behavior ==
The reef stingray normally feeds on small teleost fish and benthic crustaceans and is predated by sharks and other, larger rays. As of 2019, the species is listed as least concern on the IUCN red list.
