= Pleorchis magniporus =

Scientific classification
- Kingdom: Animalia
- Phylum: Platyhelminthes
- Class: Trematoda
- Order: Plagiorchiida
- Family: Acanthocolpidae
- Genus: Pleorchis
- Species: P. magniporus

Binomial name
- Pleorchis magniporus Arai, 1962

Species of fluke

Pleorchis magniporus is a species of flatworm which can parasitize elasmobranchs, particularly the intestines of the spotted round ray.
