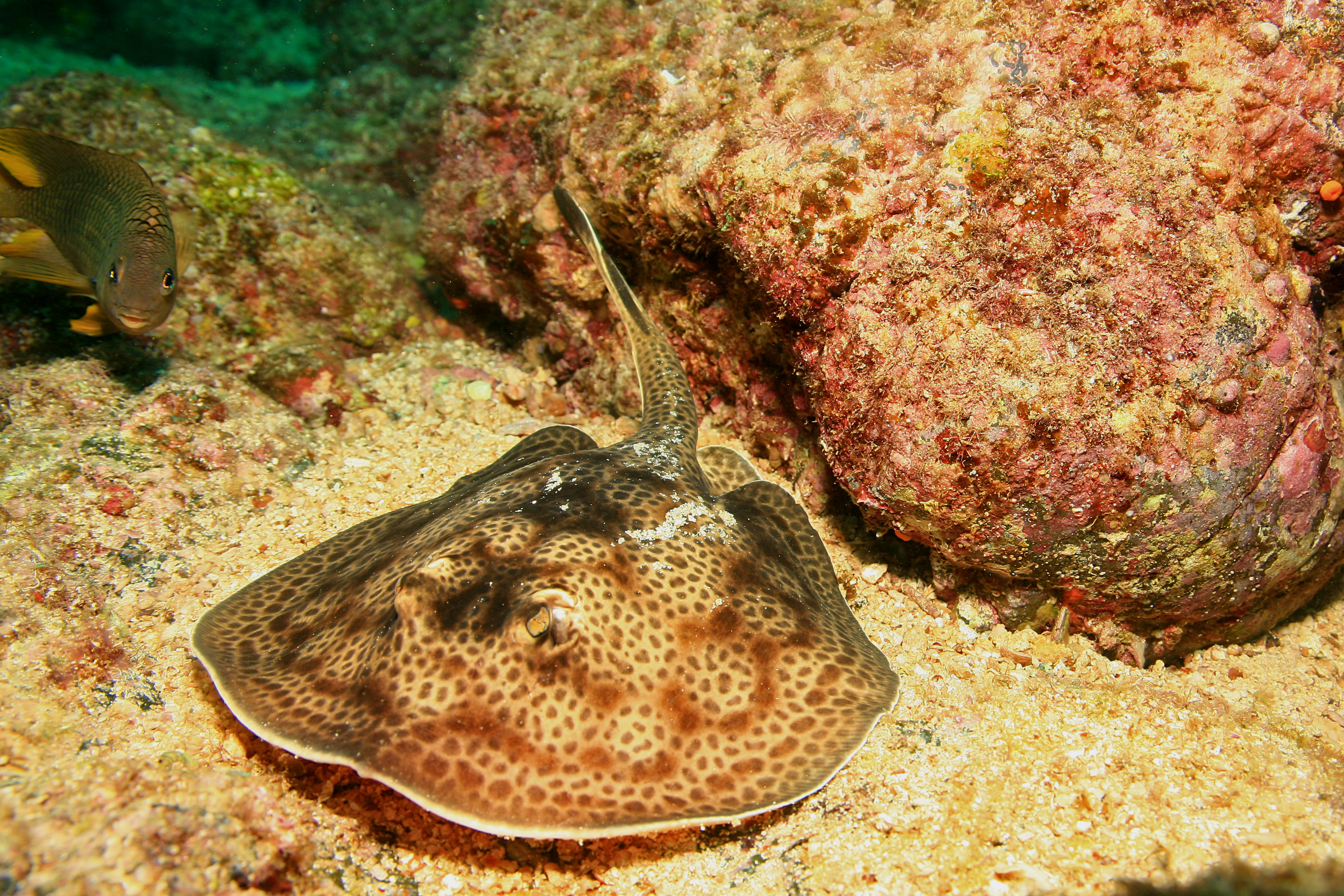
- Urobatis pardalis

Scientific classification
- Kingdom: Animalia
- Phylum: Chordata
- Class: Chondrichthyes
- Subclass: Elasmobranchii
- Order: Myliobatiformes
- Family: Urotrygonidae
- Genus: Urobatis; Garman, 1913

Type species
- Raia (Leiobatus) sloani Blainville, 1816

= Urobatis =

Genus of cartilaginous fishes

Urobatis is a genus of the family Urotrygonidae. These rays live in the tropical and warm temperate coastal waters of the Americas.

== Species ==
There are currently seven recognized species in this genus:

- Urobatis concentricus R. C. Osburn & J. T. Nichols, 1916 (Bullseye round stingray)
- Urobatis halleri J. G. Cooper, 1863 (Round stingray)
- Urobatis jamaicensis G. Cuvier, 1816 (Yellow stingray)
- Urobatis maculatus Garman, 1913 (Spotted round ray)
- Urobatis marmoratus Philippi {Krumweide}, 1893 (Chilean round stingray)
- †Urobatis molleni Hovestadt & Hovestadt-Euler, 2010
- Urobatis pardalis Del-Moral-Flores, Angulo, M. I. Bussing & W. A. Bussing, 2015 (Leopard round stingray)
- †Urobatis sloani Blainville, 1816
- Urobatis tumbesensis Chirichigno F. & McEachran, 1979 (Tumbes round stingray)
