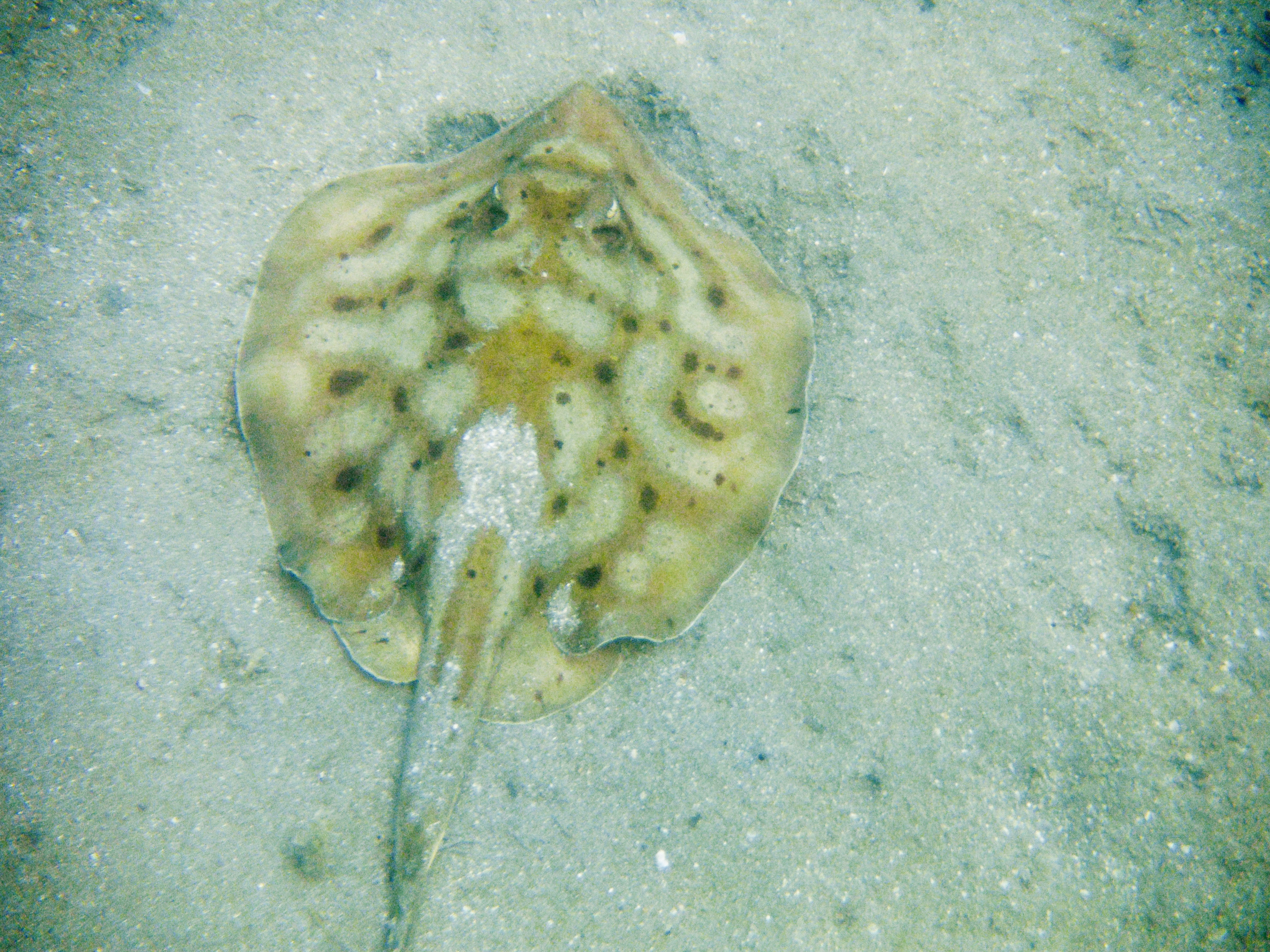
- Spotted round ray in Bahía de Loreto National Park

Conservation status
- Least Concern (IUCN 3.1)

Scientific classification
- Kingdom: Animalia
- Phylum: Chordata
- Class: Chondrichthyes
- Subclass: Elasmobranchii
- Order: Myliobatiformes
- Family: Urotrygonidae
- Genus: Urobatis
- Species: U. maculatus

Binomial name
- Urobatis maculatus (Garman, 1913)

Synonyms
- Urolophus maculatus Garman, 1913

= Spotted round ray =

Species of cartilaginous fish

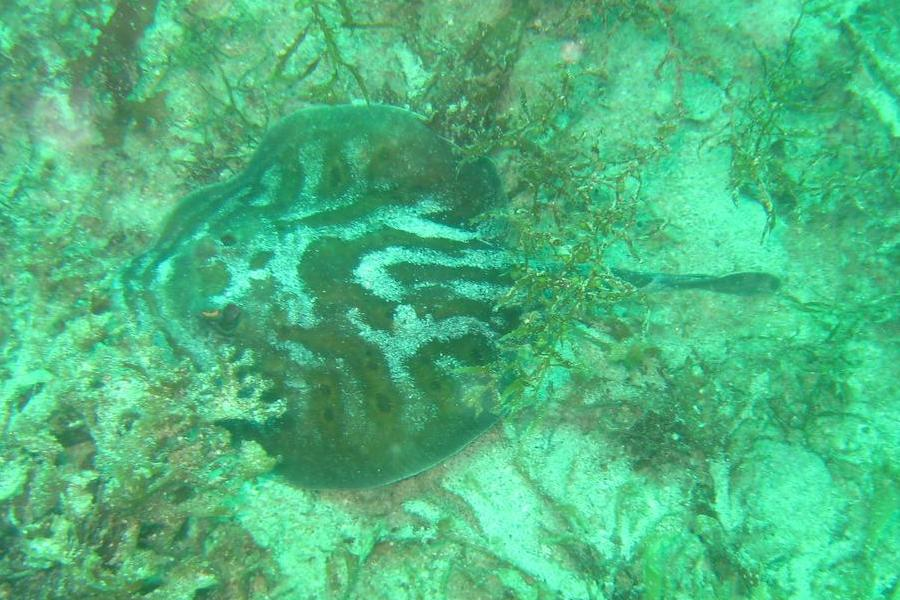
Spotted round ray in the Gulf of California

Urobatis maculatus, known as the spotted round ray or Cortez round stingray, is a species of round ray, within the genus Urobatis, and of the family Urotrygonidae. It is endemic to Mexico, with its natural habitats being shallow seas, subtidal aquatic beds, coral reefs, estuarine waters, intertidal marshes, and coastal saline lagoons.

Spotted round rays reach a length of 42 centimetres (17 in) TL. The spotted round ray is ideal for captivity due to its hardiness and smaller size, and it is also a favorable candidate for breeding in aquaria. It can be kept in a minimum 180 gallon aquarium with fine substrate, little décor, a bottom with much surface area (for sufficient swimming space), excellent filtration, protected internal tank equipment like heaters and filter intakes (by surrounding them with polyurethane foam barriers), and a secure lid. In the aquarium trade, it may be confused with the Round stingray, Urobatis halleri, which in the hobby may be called the Cortez ray as well.

The spotted round ray can be parasitized by the flatworm Pleorchis magniporus.
