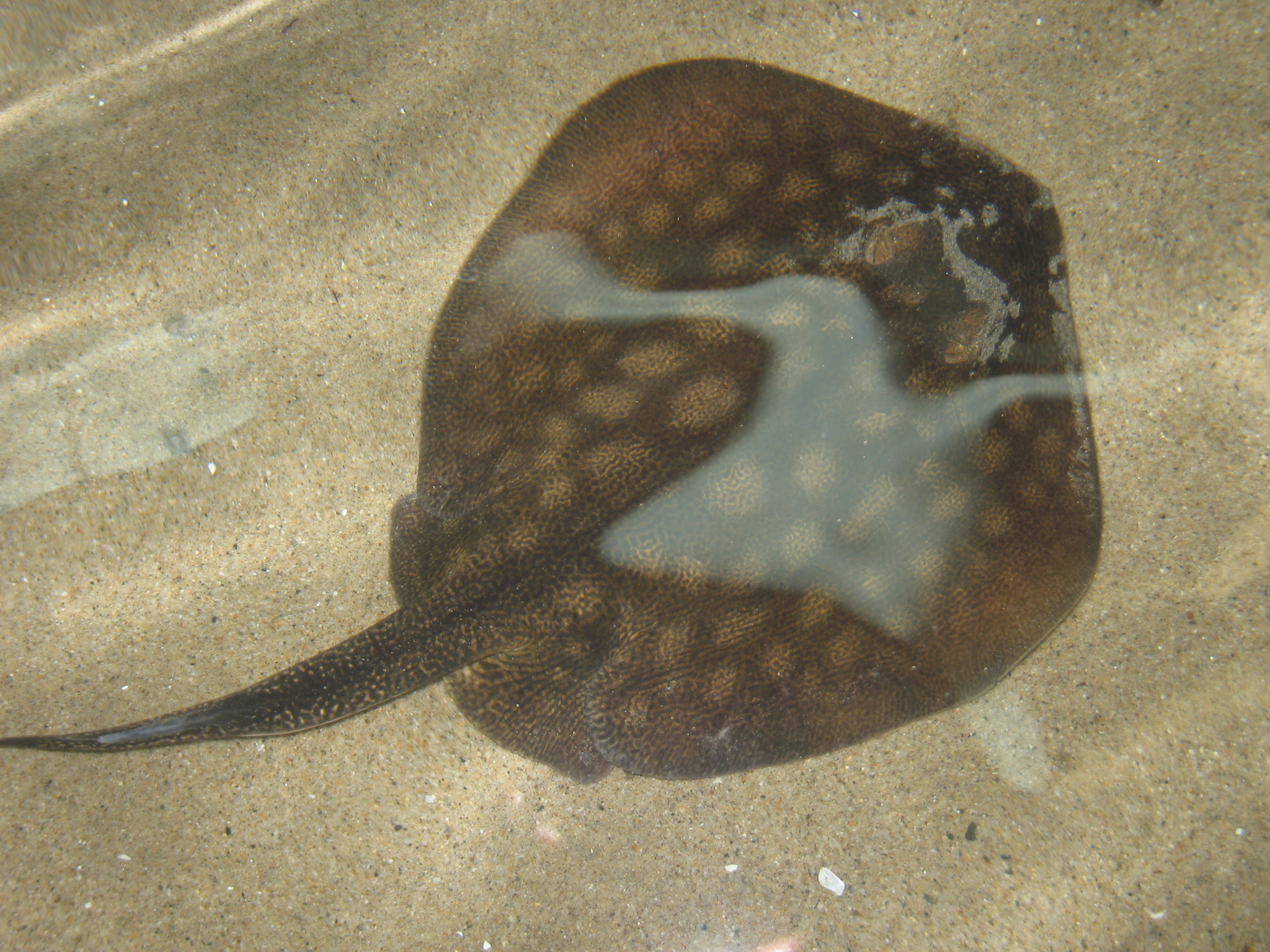
- Urobatis halleri

Conservation status
- Least Concern (IUCN 3.1)

Scientific classification
- Kingdom: Animalia
- Phylum: Chordata
- Class: Chondrichthyes
- Subclass: Elasmobranchii
- Order: Myliobatiformes
- Family: Urotrygonidae
- Genus: Urobatis
- Species: U. halleri

Binomial name
- Urobatis halleri J. G. Cooper, 1863
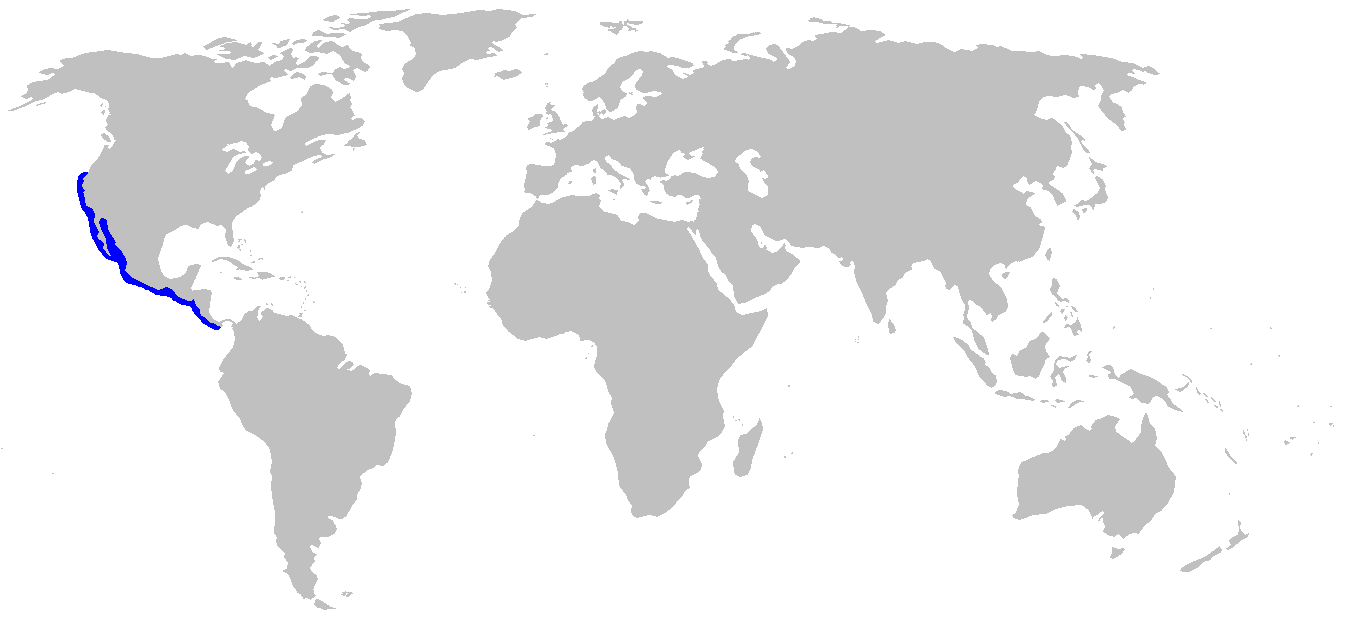
- Range of the round stingray

Synonyms
- Urolophus halleri Cooper, 1863; Urolophus nebulosus Garman, 1885; Urolophus umbrifer Jordan & Starks, 1895

= Round stingray =

Species of fish

The round stingray (Urobatis halleri) or Haller's round ray and Little round stingray is a species of round ray, family Urotrygonidae, found in the coastal waters of the tropical and subtropical parts of the northeastern Pacific Ocean. It is a small, common ray that feeds mostly on benthic invertebrates. On the beaches of southern California, it is responsible for numerous injuries to bathers, who are stung when they accidentally step on the fish. The wound caused by its venomous spine can be painful, but is non-fatal.

== Taxonomy ==
The species name, halleri, is after the young son of Major Granville O. Haller of the United States Army, who was stung on the foot while wading along the shores of San Diego Bay.

== Distribution and habitat ==
This species is endemic to the eastern North Pacific Ocean, from Humboldt Bay in northern California south to Panama. It is most common around southern California and the Baja Peninsula. They inhabit tropical to warm-temperate waters close to shore, usually less than 15 m deep, although they have been reported to a depth of at least 91 m. This species favors soft-bottomed habitats such as mud or sand, often with abundant eelgrass, which they use for camouflage. They also occur around rocky reefs.

Round stingrays prefer temperatures above 10 °C (50 °F); the adults are more tolerant of temperature changes than juveniles. They are most abundant in the coastal and bay waters of southern California from spring to fall. In winter, they move to deeper water where the temperature is more stable. Round stingrays have been observed congregating near the warm seawater effluent released by coastal electric generators, which may replicate the conditions of estuary environments.

== Description ==
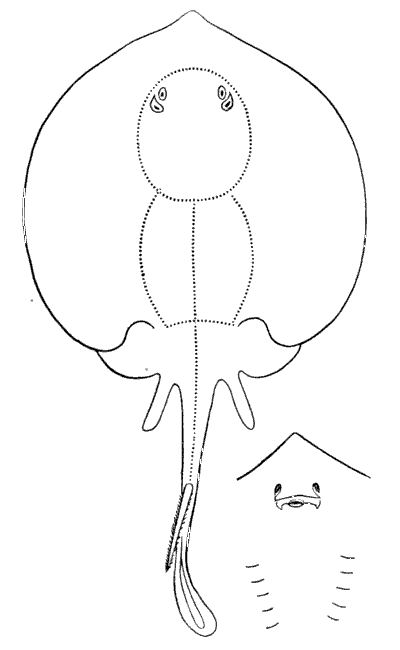
A dorsal and ventral illustration of the round stingray.

Different color and pattern variations amongst round stingrays at the Aquarium of the Pacific.

The round stingray has a nearly round pectoral fin disc usually colored brown or grayish brown above, with pale yellow spots or reticulations. Some individuals are plain or black. The underside is white to yellowish. The tail is short and stout, with a long, thick, serrated stinging spine. The teeth are small and diamond-shaped, and sexually dimorphic in that the central teeth of males are erect, sharply pointed, and curved inward. They attain a maximum pectoral fin disc width of 25 cm in males and 31 cm in females.

The tail spine is periodically shed and replaced; for most of the year round stingrays have only one spine, but at the beginning of July small secondary spines begin to appear. The number of rays with secondary spines increases to a peak around September and October, then declines as the primary spines fall off and are replaced. The replacement process is complete by December.

== Biology and ecology ==
In nature, round stingrays strongly segregate by age and sex, with the females staying in water deeper than 14 m and males and juveniles in shallower habitat. The juveniles feed on polychaete worms and small benthic crabs until they are 14 cm across. As they mature, their diet shifts towards bivalve molluscs. Round stingrays are daytime foragers that are most active in the warm temperatures of summer and fall. Using their pectoral disc and mouths, they dig large pits to uncover buried prey. The digging of these pits plays an ecologically important role, as they also uncover prey for smaller fish.

In the northern part of its range, round stingrays are preyed upon by the northern elephant seal and the giant sea bass. Other predators include large sharks. Numerous parasites are known for the round stingray, comprising 40 species in approximately 19 families. External parasites include copepods and leeches, while 16 species of tapeworms are known from its digestive system, including Phyllobothrium hallericola n. sp. and Acanthobothrium olseni. Additional parasites that may be found in this ray's spiral valve intestine include Eimeria chollaensis sp. nov. and Rhinebothrium spp.

As with other stingrays, the round stingray reproduces through aplacental viviparity, bearing litters of 1–6 young with an average of 2–3. The litter size increases with female size. The gestation period is three months, with the young measuring 6–8 cm across at birth. The females are able to store sperm year-round. In southern California, the females move inshore to mate from April to June, with the young being born between June and October. Further south in the Gulf of California, females mate and give birth earlier, from late winter to spring. A portion of the population mate and give birth in winter, allowing for a second breeding season later that same year. After giving birth, the adult females move back into deeper water while the young remain in the shallows. Female round stingrays emit a localized positive electric field from near the spiracles behind each eye, which serves to attract males. The males will bite at the area, with successful contact necessary for copulation. Round stingrays grow at 3 cm per year until they reach maturity at around 31 months, at which time their growth rate slows.

== Relationship to humans ==
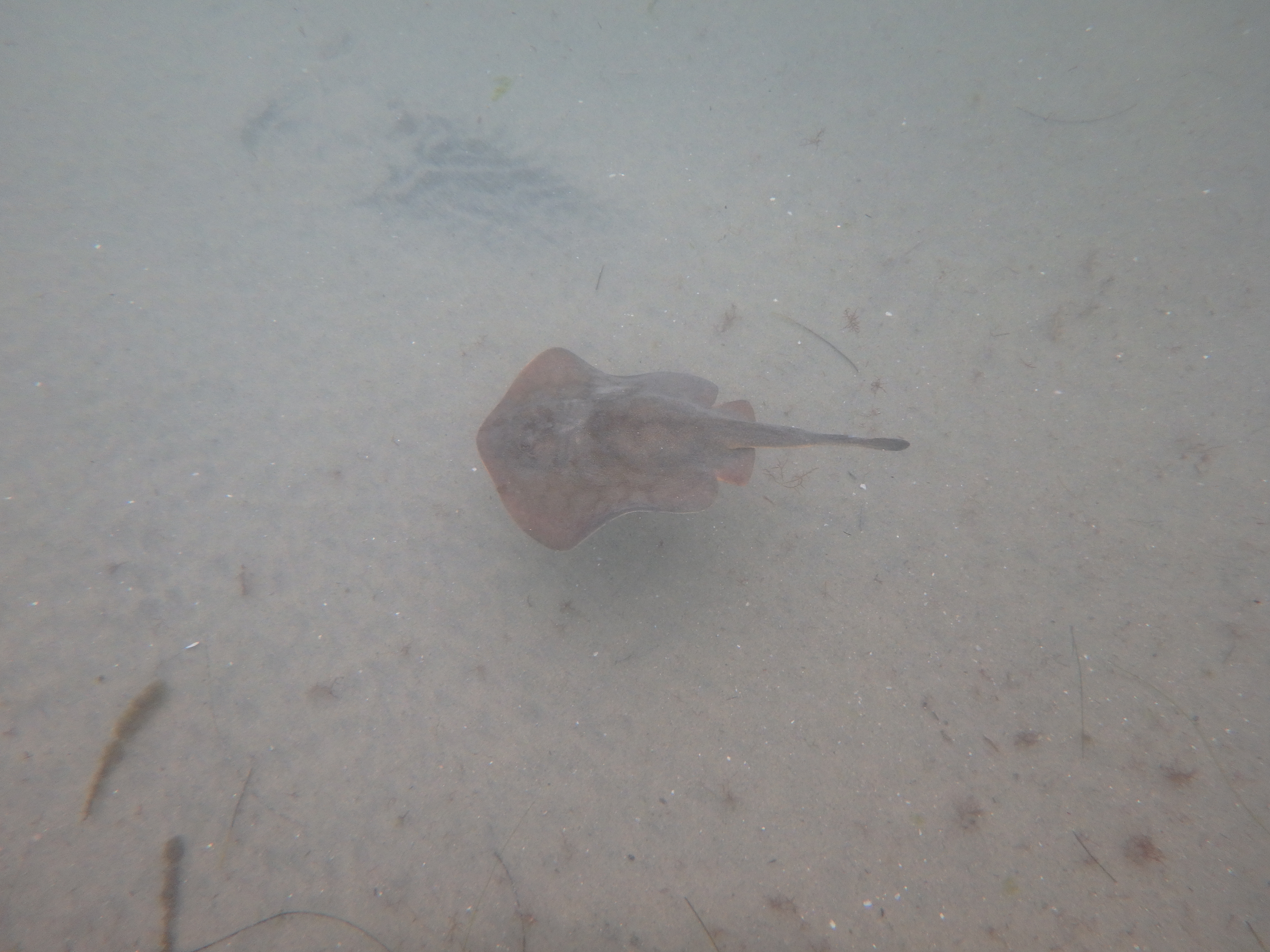
A round stingray at La Jolla, CA. This species injures hundreds of people each year off California.

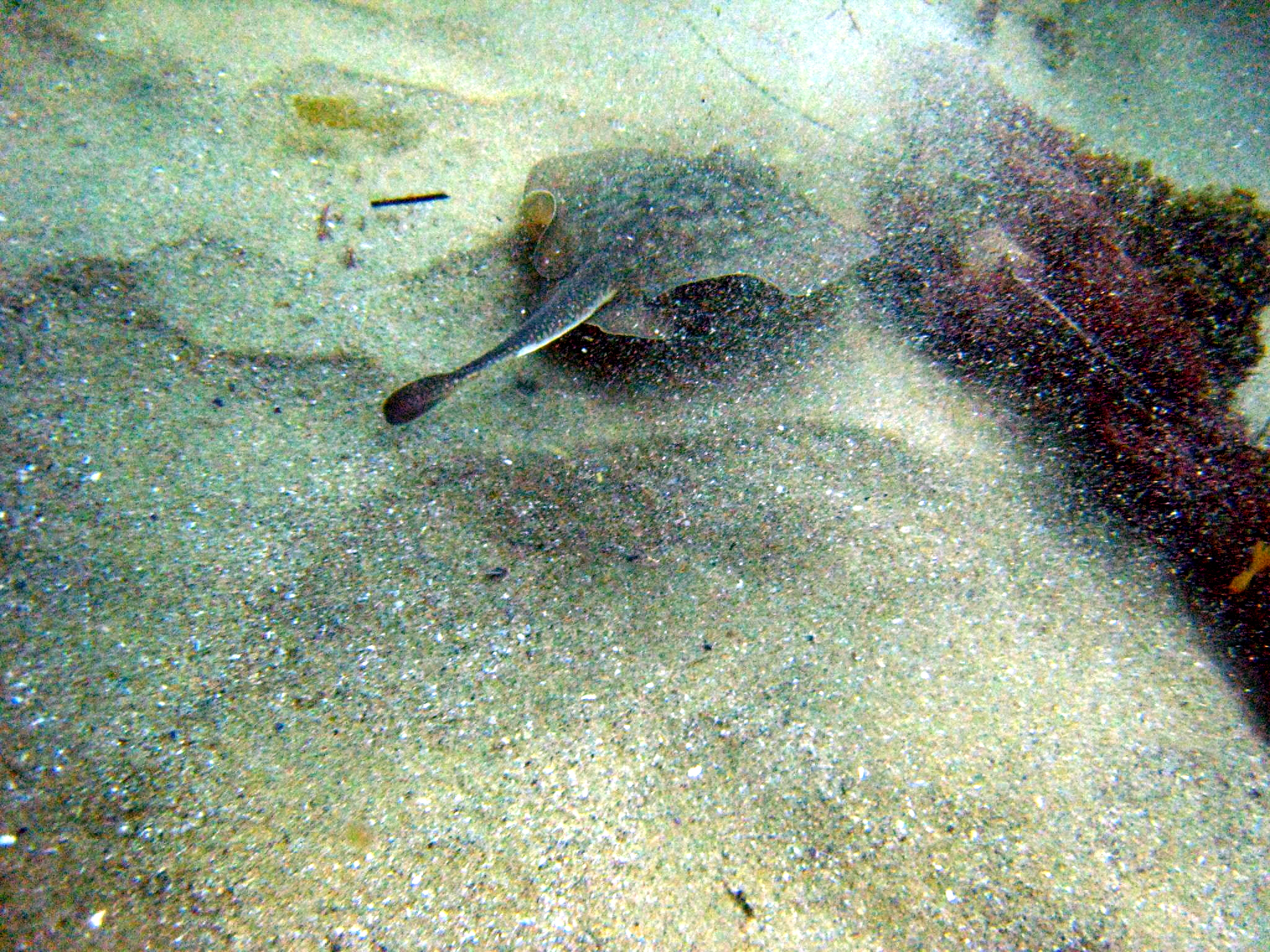
A round stingray at Laguna Beach, CA.

Every year, hundreds of beachgoers are accidentally stung by round stingrays along the coast of southern California. The sting is not fatal, though it is quite painful. The so-called "Ray Bay" at the northern end of Seal Beach, used as a nursery ground by round stingrays, is the most notorious location for these incidents.

Due to its small size and large tail spine, the round stingray is considered commercially undesirable. It is occasionally caught (and discarded) by recreational anglers and artisanal gillnet fisheries. In Mexico, the tail is usually cleaved off before the ray is discarded, likely causing high mortality. This species is also taken as bycatch by shrimp trawlers, who consider them a nuisance as large groups often become entangled in the nets. Due to its abundance and relatively high rate of reproduction, the round stingray is assessed as of Least Concern on the IUCN Red List.

== In captivity ==
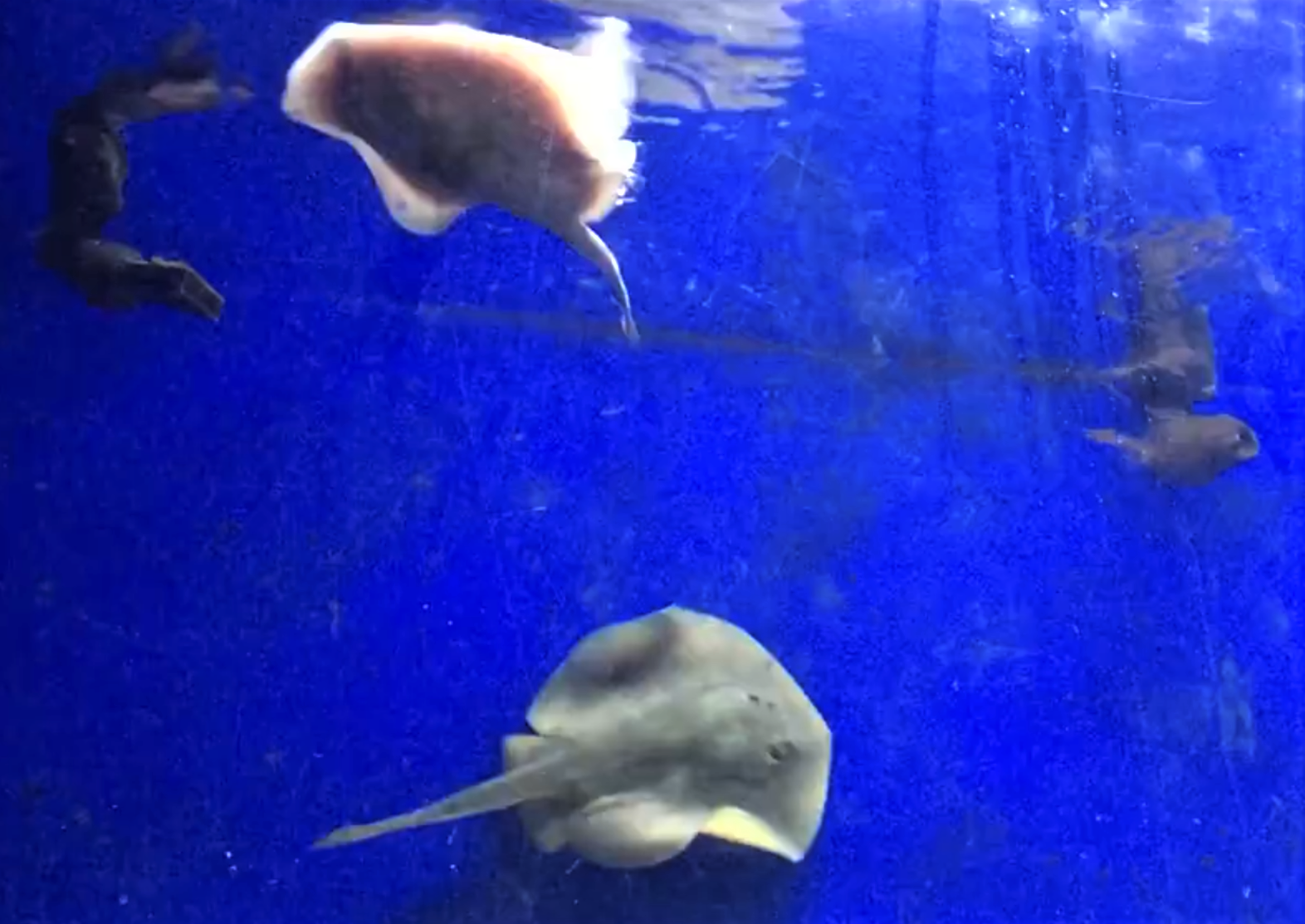
Two Round stingrays in an aquarium at a fishstore labeled as Cortez rays.

Round stingrays frequently make their way into the aquarium trade and are well suited for captive life given their relatively small size and hardiness (if provided with a proper environment). An aquarium with very little aquascaping (rocks, decorations, etc.), a bed of fine substrate (fine sand as opposed to coarse sand and gravel), adequate filtration (given the messy feeding habits of rays), a secure lid or cover, much swimming area (long, wide tanks as opposed to tall, skinny ones), dim lighting, linear flow (a.k.a. constant not chaotic flow), a total flow rate of 10+ the tank's volume per hour moving in a fashion similar to that of a whirl pool (with no areas of low flow in the tank), and a water temperature of in between 12 °C (53.6 °F) and 22 °C (71.6 °F) is suitable for this ray. Additionally, any protruding equipment in the aquarium like overflows should be surrounded by polyurethane foam barriers to prevent injury towards the ray and dissolved oxygen levels should be maintained at 7–8ppm (slightly more if ozone is used). Stray electrical currents and concentrations of metal in the tank water should be avoided meaning that copper should not be used as medicine on this ray. Feeding should be done with a feeding stick or long forceps seven times a week (preferably with food that does not contain thiaminase) to ensure the ray eats what is intended for it. Small individuals should be fed non fibrous foods like frozen Mysid shrimp, live Brine shrimp and Blackworms, and finely chopped Shrimp. Iodine should also be administered through water changes and/or Elasmobranch vitamins. If it is not administered, this ray can develop Goitre.

Unhealthy individuals will lose weight and have a seemingly hollow abdomen, become lethargic, have faded markings, and they will take on a light shade of gray. These individuals should not be purchased. When first introduced to a tank, Round stingrays may fast for a period of time. A good food source to get them eating is live food including Grass shrimp. After living within aquarium confines for a period of time, they will become relatively tame. Tankmates that should be avoided are Scorpionfish, Butterflyfish, large Angelfish (Pygoplites/Pomacanthus/Holacanthus), Filefish, Triggerfish, Pufferfish, Porcupinefish, certain Sharks (Ginglymostomatidae/Orectolobidae), large Crabs, Hermit crabs, and Sea anemones. These can all irritate or lead to the demise of a Round stingray in an aquarium. Round stingrays may also rest on top of/ knock over Corals which may sting the ray or get damaged so it is a poor choice for a Reef aquarium even though they do not consume corals. As a juvenile, the ray is also vulnerable to being consumed by Frogfish and large Groupers.

The Round stingray is most often collected from California's southern coast and this is probably how the Round stingray has earned the name California stingray in the aquarium trade. It also goes by several other names in the hobby including the Spotted stingray, Cortez ray, and Dwarf cortez ray. When it is sold under the last two names, it is often misidentified with the very similar Cortez round stingray (Urobatis maculatus). The two can be told apart because the Round stingray lacks the black spots the Cortez round stingray has on either side of its disk.

Round stingrays are also kept in some Public aquariums including the Aquarium of the Pacific in Long Beach, California where their tail spines are clipped off periodically so they are safe to touch until they grow back.

== Gallery ==
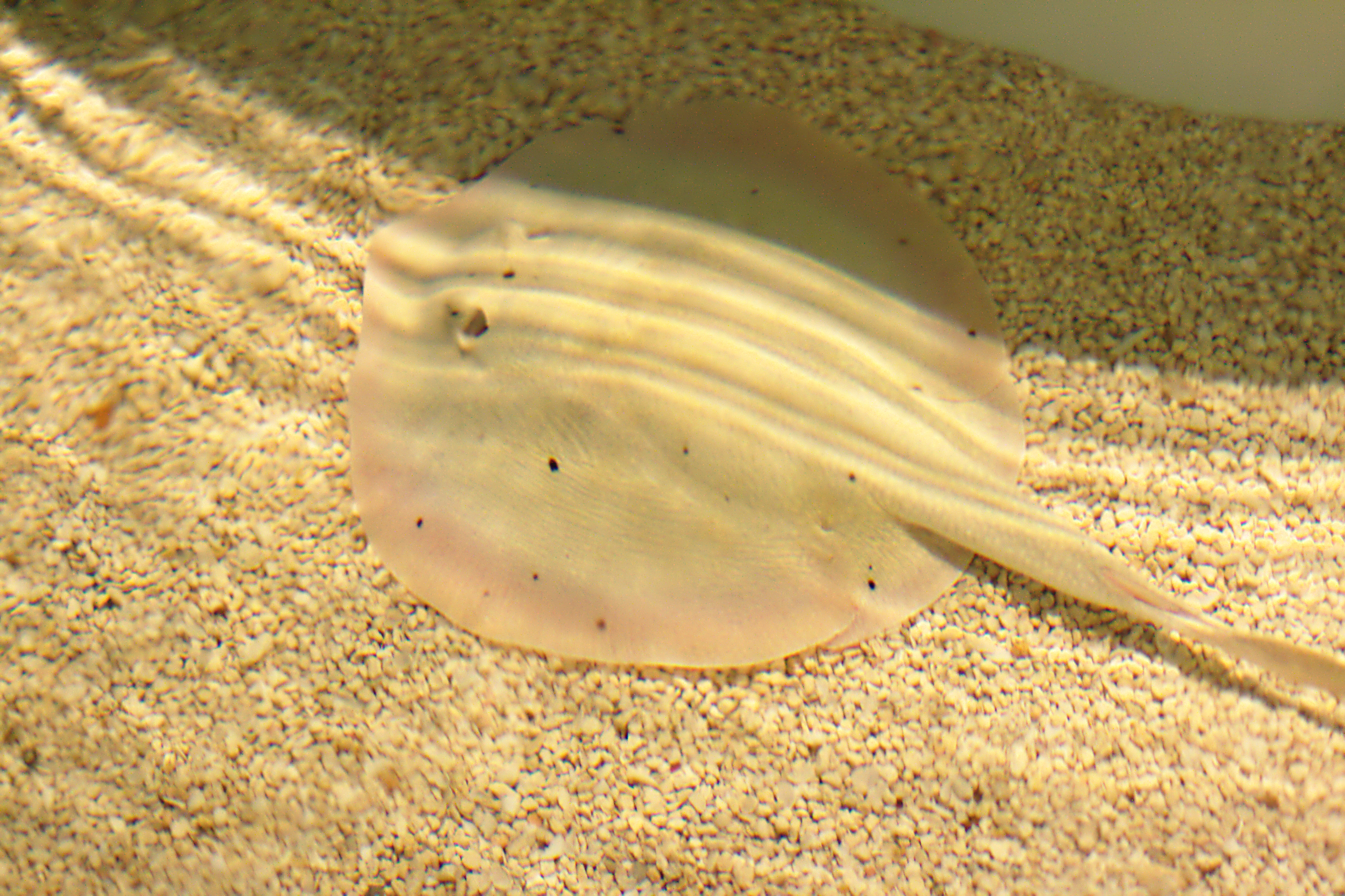
A round stingray in the Reiman Aquarium at Discovery World.

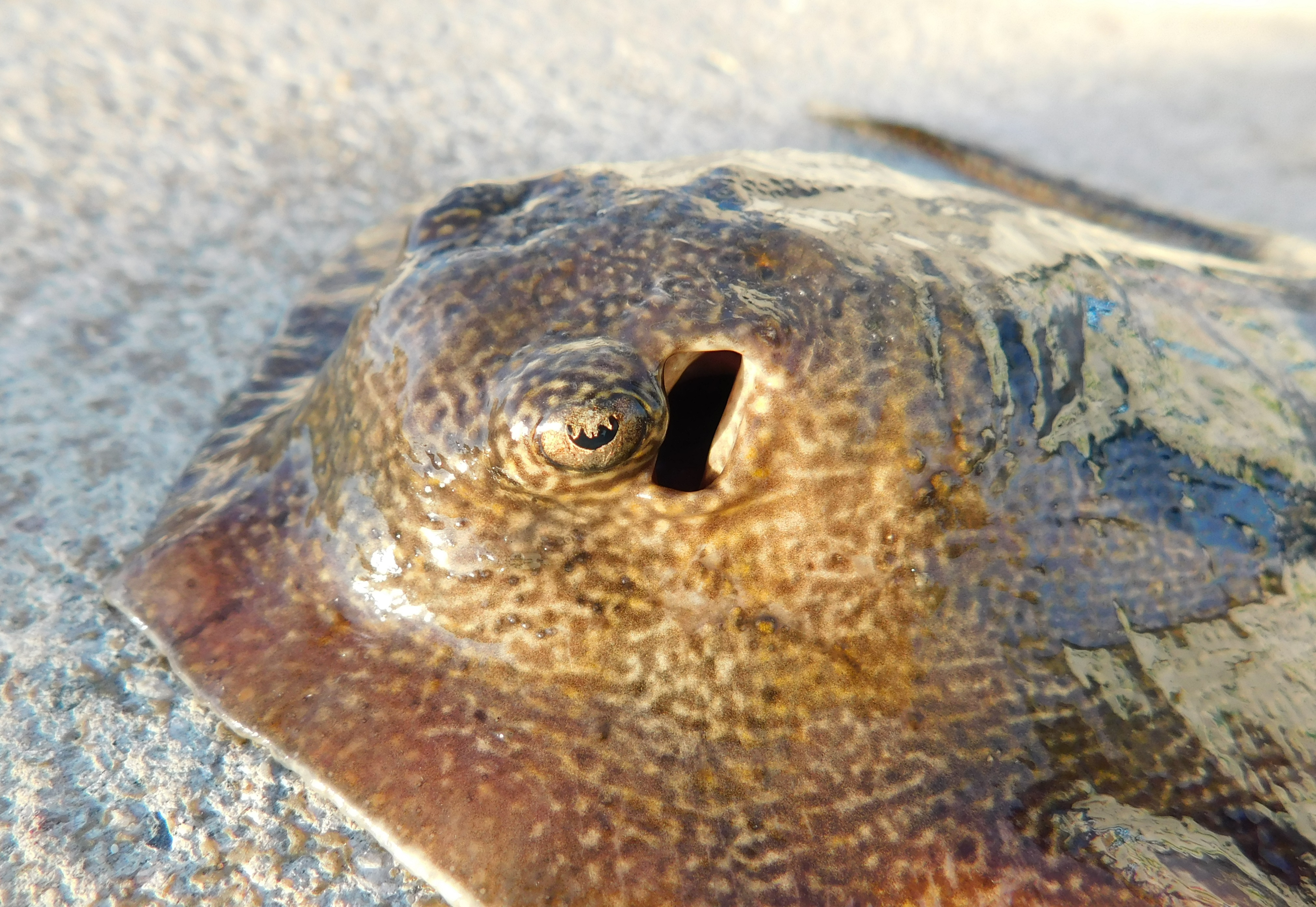
A round stingray caught in San Diego Bay, CA.

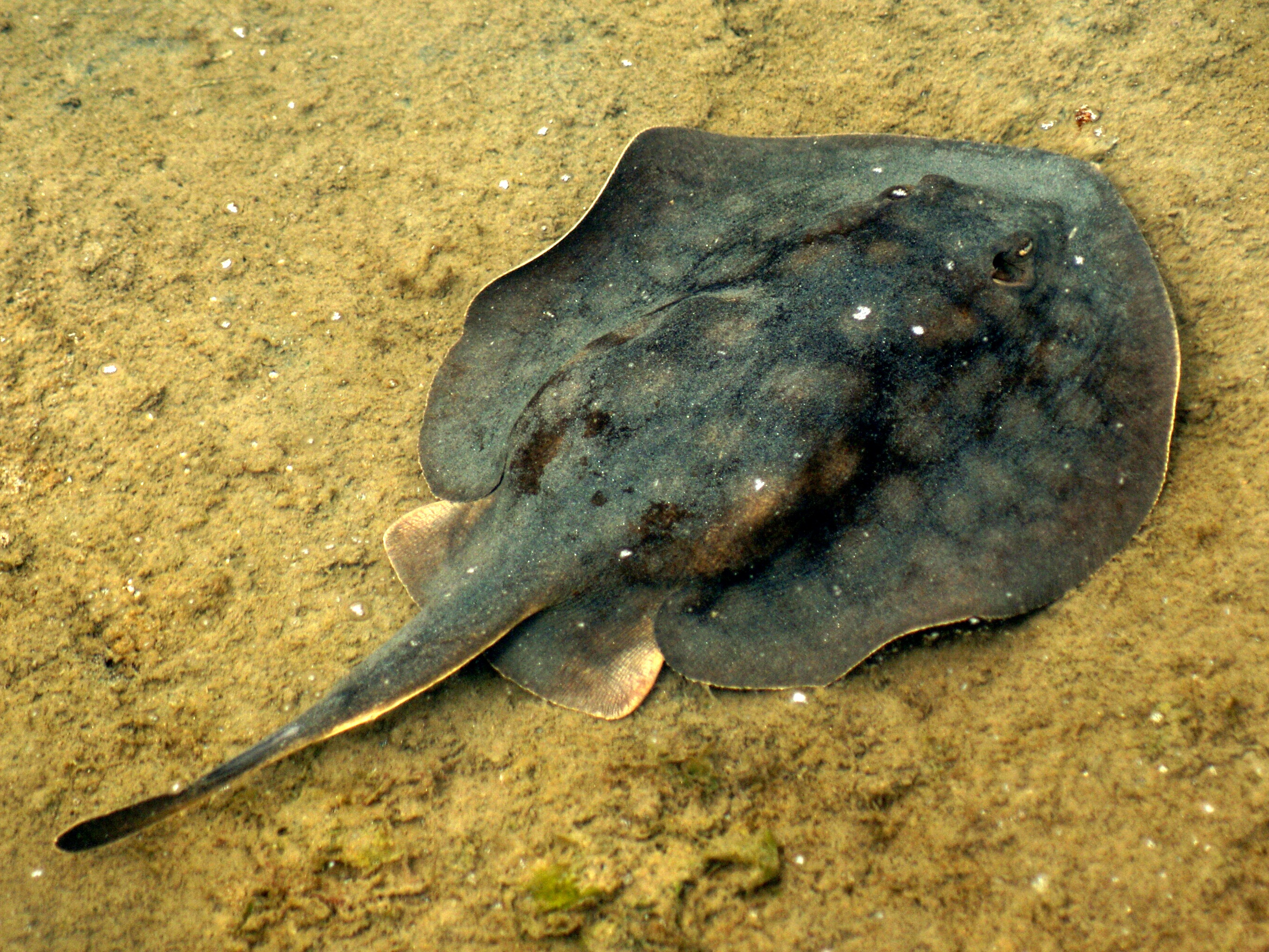
A round stingray in a Bolsa Chica wetland, CA.

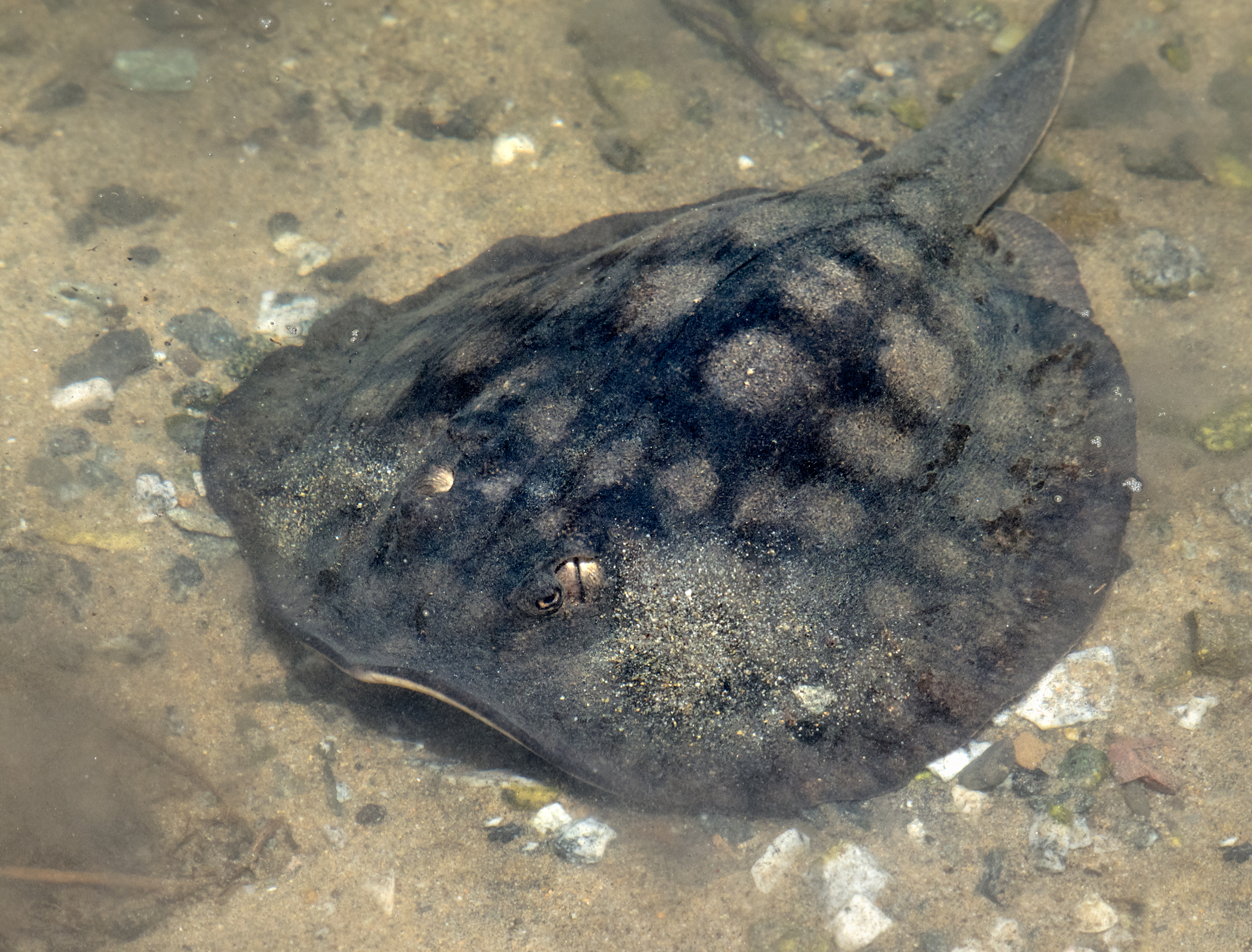
A round stingray in a Bolsa Chica wetland, CA creating clouds of sand.

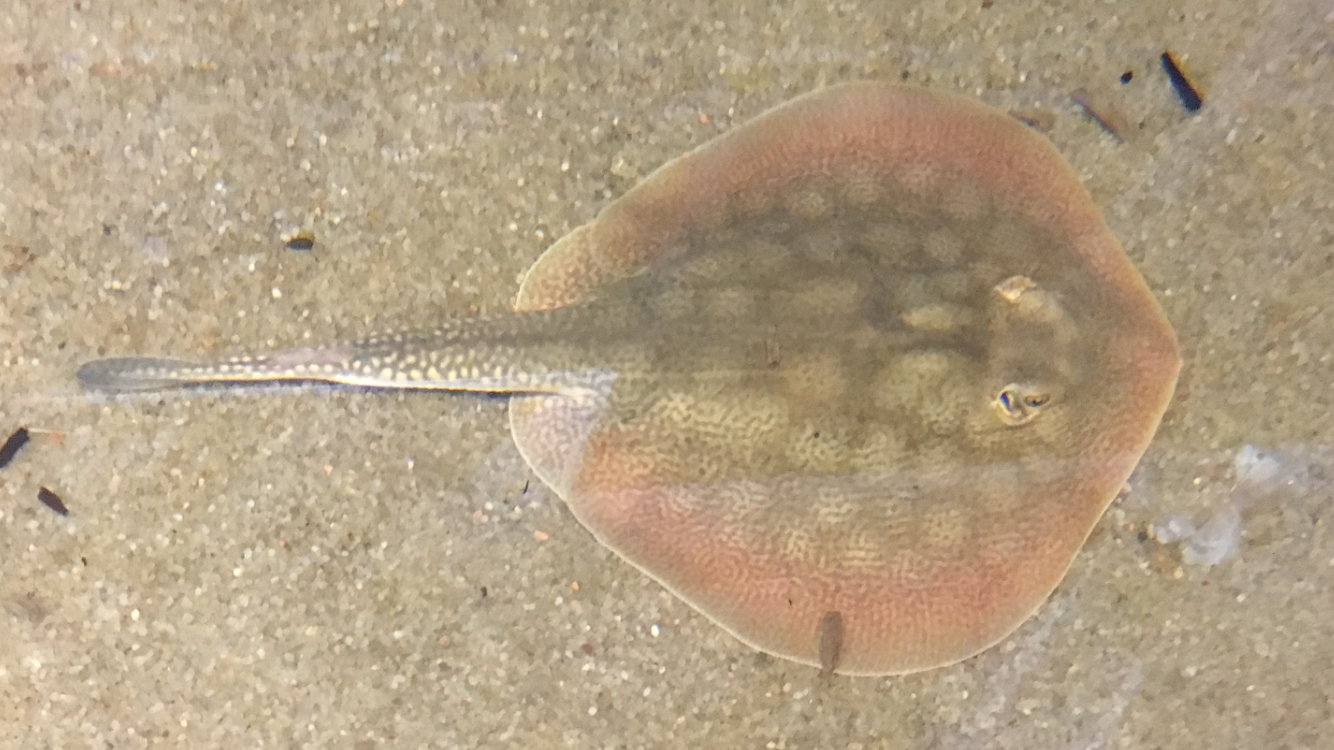
A round stingray resting in the Monterey Bay Aquarium.

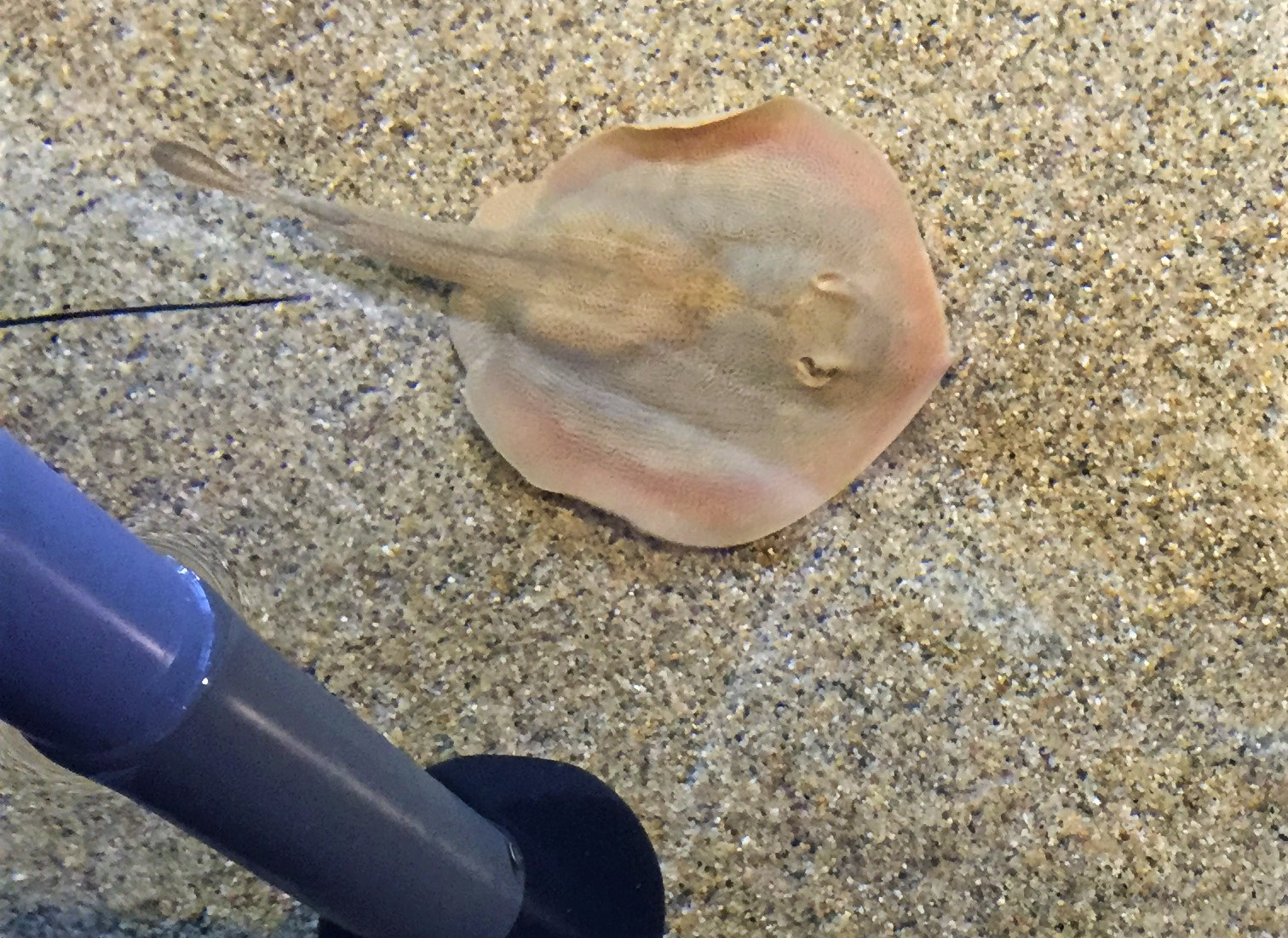
An active round stingray in the Monterey Bay Aquarium.

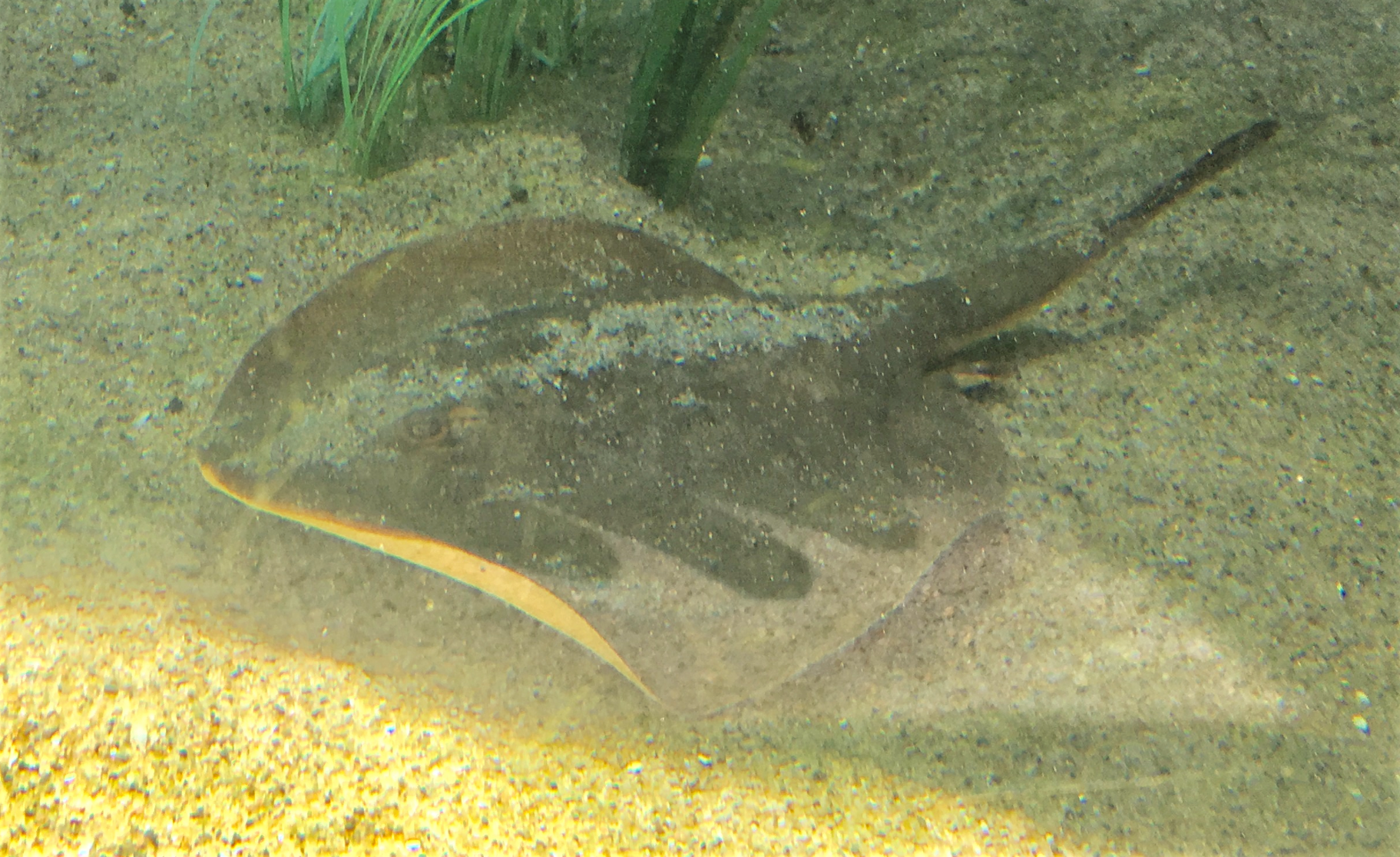
A round stingray lifting off the bottom at the Aquarium of the Pacific.

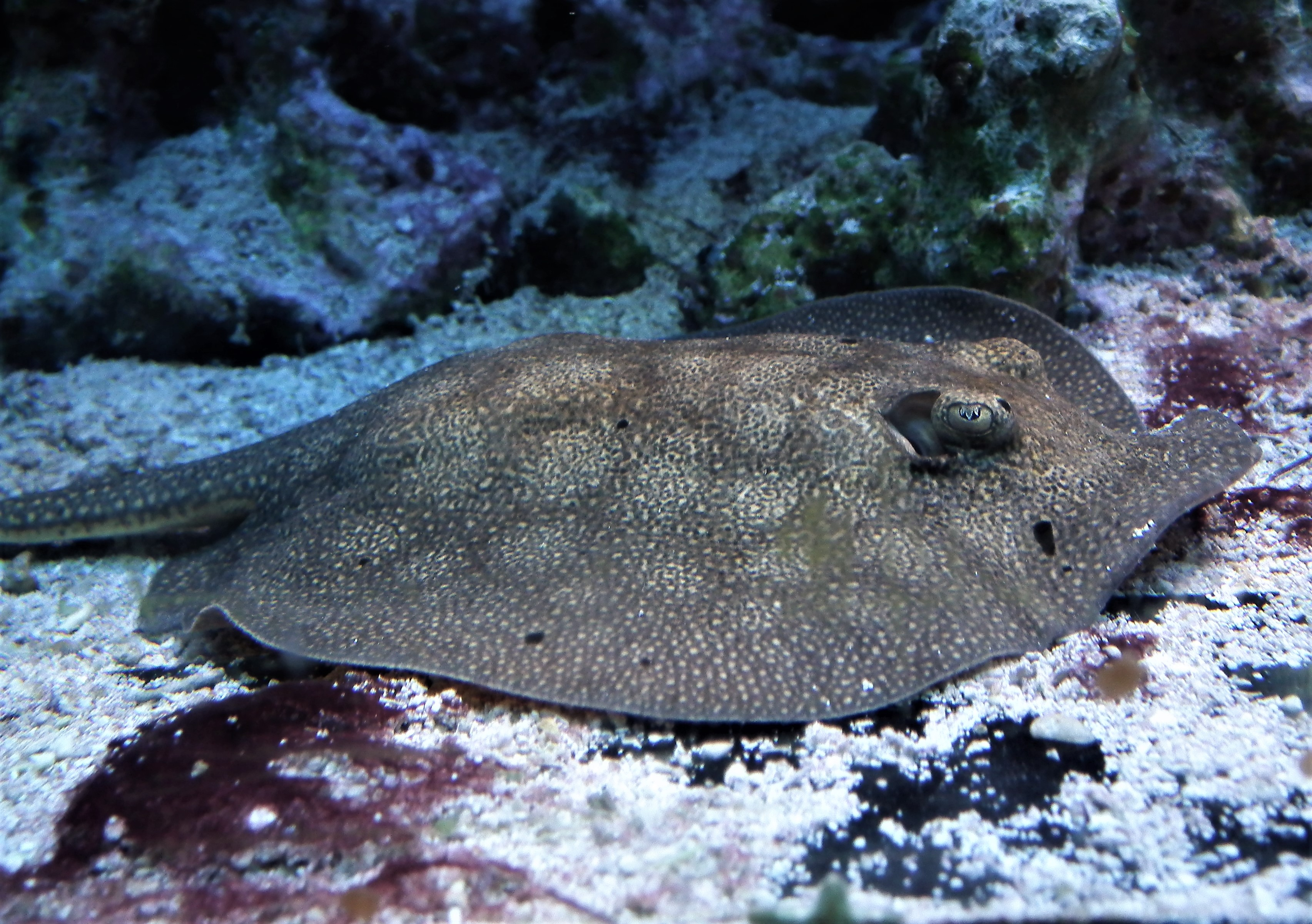
A round stingray in the Gdynia Aquarium.

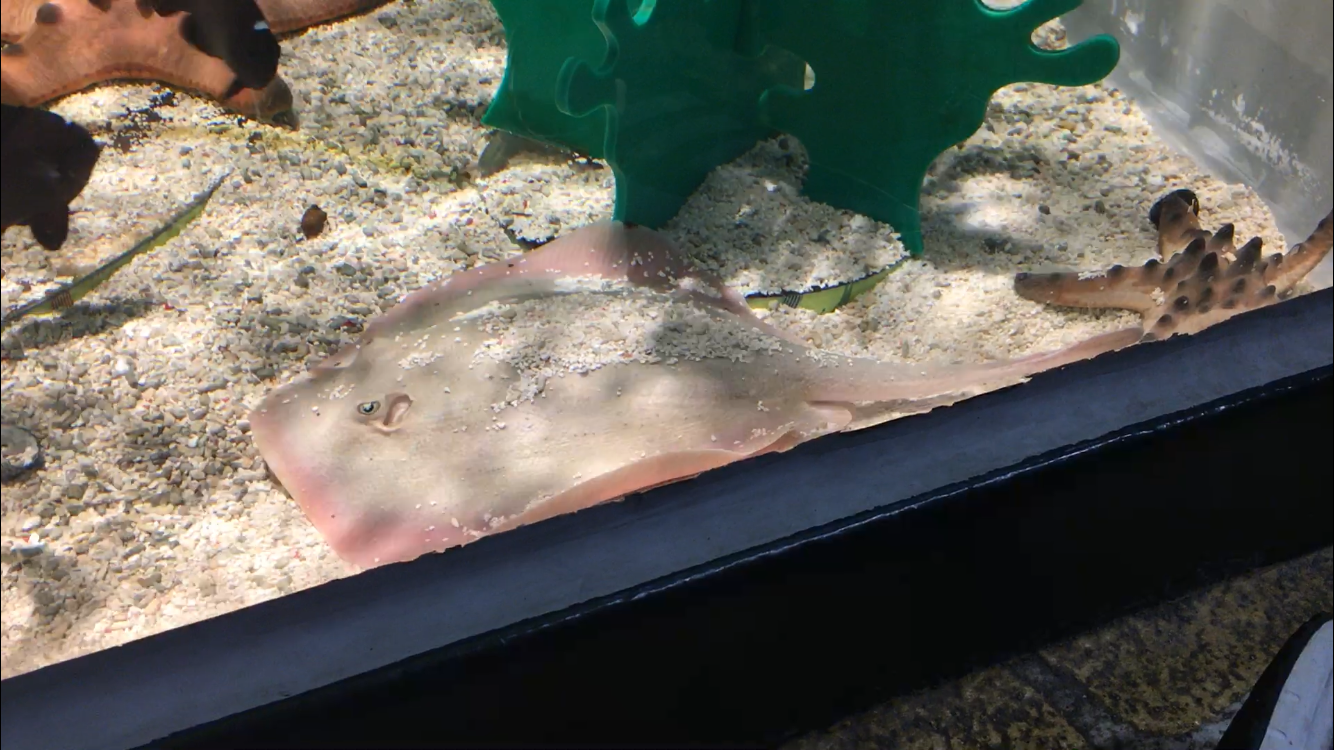
A round stingray in the Lotte World Aquarium at Lotte World Mall.
