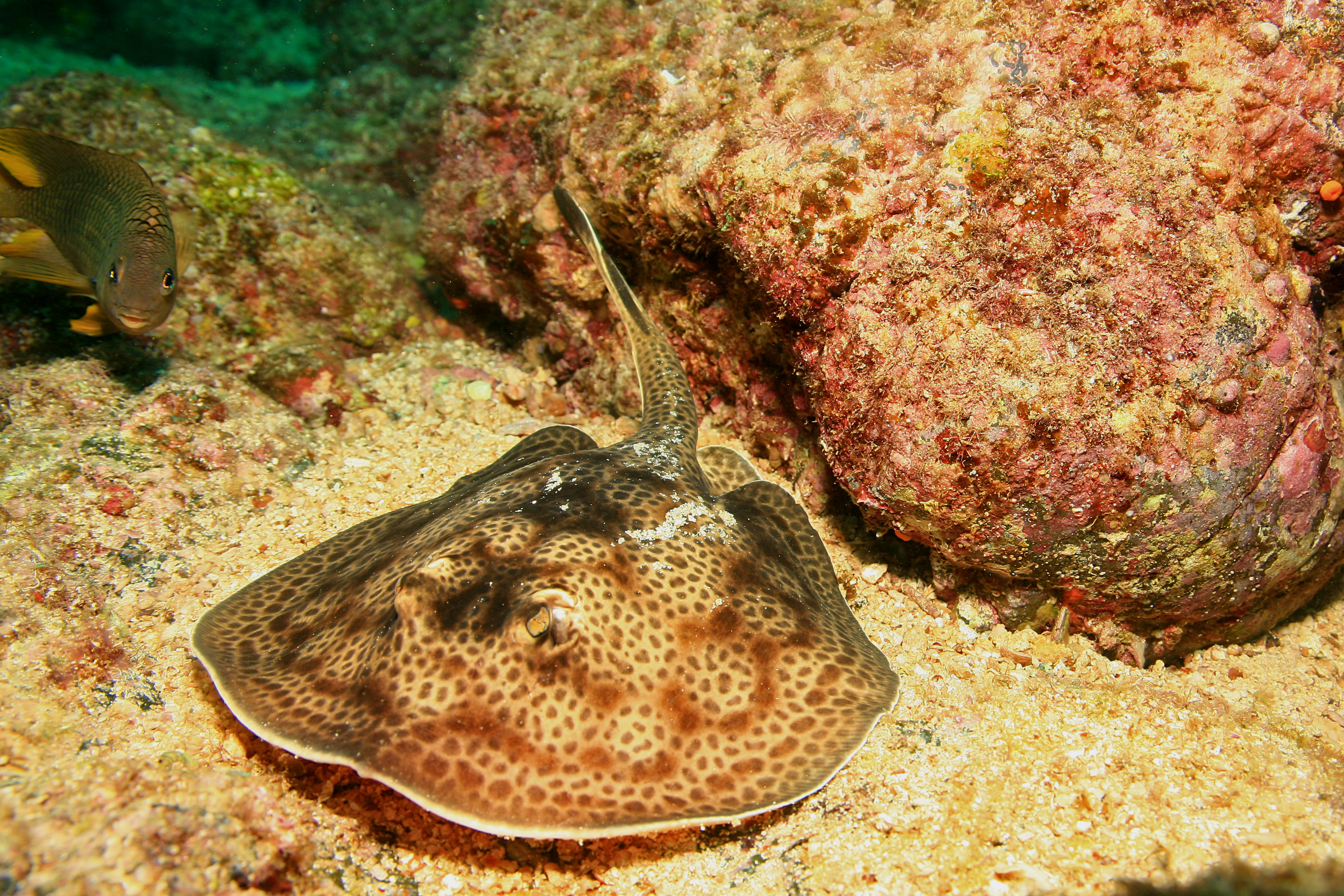

Scientific classification
- Kingdom: Animalia
- Phylum: Chordata
- Class: Chondrichthyes
- Subclass: Elasmobranchii
- Division: Batomorphi
- Order: Myliobatiformes
- Family: Urotrygonidae; McEachran, Dunn & Miyake, 1996

Genera
- Urobatis; Urotrygon

= Urotrygonidae =

Family of cartilaginous fishes

Urotrygonidae is a family of rays in the order Myliobatiformes, commonly referred to as the American round stingrays or round rays. They are native to the tropical and warm temperate marine waters of the Americas. There are 20 recognized species in this family, grouped into two genera. The two genera in this family were formerly placed within the family Urolophidae, whose species are now restricted to the Indo-Pacific. They have a round pectoral fin disk, a slender tail with a caudal fin, no dorsal fins, and a venomous tail spine.
