= Astroblepus ventralis =

Conservation status
- Vulnerable (IUCN 3.1)

Scientific classification
- Kingdom: Animalia
- Phylum: Chordata
- Class: Actinopterygii
- Order: Siluriformes
- Family: Astroblepidae
- Genus: Astroblepus
- Species: A. ventralis

Binomial name
- Astroblepus ventralis (C. H. Eigenmann, 1912)

Synonyms
- Cyclopium ventrale C. H. Eigenmann, 1912

Species of fish

Astroblepus ventralis is a species of freshwater ray-finned fish belonging to the family Astroblepidae, the climbing catfishes. This catfish is found in South America where it occurs in the Pacific coastal drainages of the Dagua and San Juan Rivers in Colombia. This species attains a maximum standard length of 8 cm (3.1 in).

== Bibliography ==
- Eschmeyer, William N., ed. 1998. Catalog of Fishes. Special Publication of the Center for Biodiversity Research and Information, num. 1, vol. 1–3. California Academy of Sciences. San Francisco, California, United States. 2905. ISBN 0-940228-47-5.
