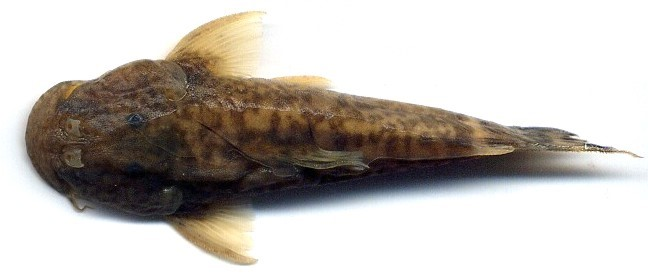
- Astroblepus unifasciatus

Conservation status
- Least Concern (IUCN 3.1)

Scientific classification
- Kingdom: Animalia
- Phylum: Chordata
- Class: Actinopterygii
- Order: Siluriformes
- Family: Astroblepidae
- Genus: Astroblepus
- Species: A. unifasciatus

Binomial name
- Astroblepus unifasciatus (C. H. Eigenmann, 1912)

Synonyms
- Cyclopium unifasciatum Eigenmann, 1912

= Astroblepus unifasciatus =

Species of fish

Astroblepus unifasciatus is a species of freshwater ray-finned fish belonging to the family Astroblepidae, the climbing catfishes. This catfish is endemic to Colombia, where it is found in the Dagua River basin, Pacific coastal drainages, Magdalena, Cauca, San Juan, and Atrato River basinss. This species attains a maximum standard length of 7 cm (2.8 in).

== Bibliography ==
- Eschmeyer, William N., ed. 1998. Catalog of Fishes. Special Publication of the Center for Biodiversity Research and Information, num. 1, vol. 1–3. California Academy of Sciences. San Francisco, California, United States. 2905. ISBN 0-940228-47-5.
