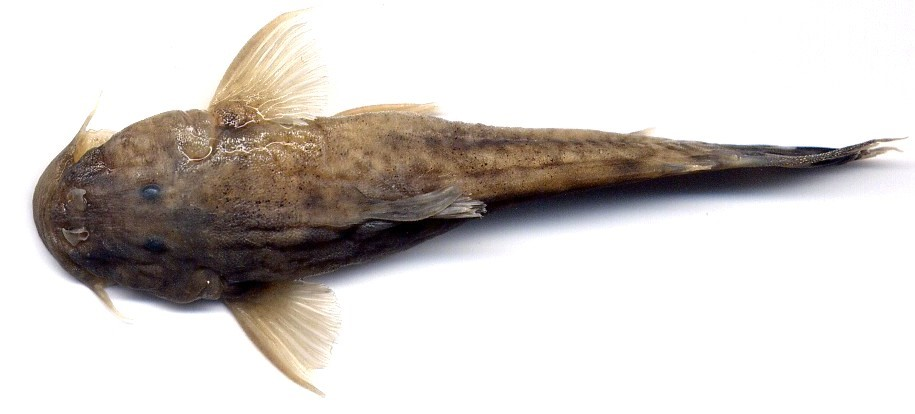

Conservation status
- Data Deficient (IUCN 3.1).

Scientific classification
- Kingdom: Animalia
- Phylum: Chordata
- Class: Actinopterygii
- Order: Siluriformes
- Family: Astroblepidae
- Genus: Astroblepus
- Species: A. frenatus

Binomial name
- Astroblepus frenatus C. H. Eigenmann, 1918

= Astroblepus frenatus =

Species of fish

Astroblepus frenatus is a species of freshwater ray-finned fish belonging to the family Astroblepidae, the climbing catfishes. This catfish is found in the Magdalena, Orinoco and Catatumbo river basins in Colombia. A. frenatus is a carnivorous species and it is a habitat specialist which has a requirement for highly oxygenated water. This means that it is sensitive to changes in oxygenation levels and water temperatures. It may also be affected by the introduced rainbow trout (Oncorhynchus mykiss) but overall there is very little data about the status of this species. This species has a maximum total length of 6 cm (2.4 in).

== Bibliography ==
- Eschmeyer, William N., ed. 1998. Catalog of Fishes. Special Publication of the Center for Biodiversity Research and Information, num. 1, vol. 1–3. California Academy of Sciences. San Francisco, California, United States. 2905. ISBN 0-940228-47-5.
