= Astroblepus mancoi =

Conservation status
- Data Deficient (IUCN 3.1)

Scientific classification
- Kingdom: Animalia
- Phylum: Chordata
- Class: Actinopterygii
- Order: Siluriformes
- Family: Astroblepidae
- Genus: Astroblepus
- Species: A. mancoi

Binomial name
- Astroblepus mancoi C. H. Eigenmann, 1928

Species of fish

Astroblepus mancoi is a species of freshwater ray-finned fish belonging to the family Astroblepidae, the climbing catfishes. This catfish is found in South America, being endemic to the Amazon basin of Peru.

The specific name, mancoi, honours the Inca governor and founder Ayar Manco, also known as Manco Cápac, "the Moses of the Peruvians, who led the exodus from Tampu-tocco to Cuzco about 1100 A.D."

== Bibliography ==
- Eschmeyer, William N., ed. 1998. Catalog of Fishes. Special Publication of the Center for Biodiversity Research and Information, num. 1, vol. 1–3. California Academy of Sciences. San Francisco, California, United States. 2905. ISBN 0-940228-47-5.
