= Astroblepus cirratus =

Conservation status
- Least Concern (IUCN 3.1)

Scientific classification
- Kingdom: Animalia
- Phylum: Chordata
- Class: Actinopterygii
- Order: Siluriformes
- Family: Astroblepidae
- Genus: Astroblepus
- Species: A. cirratus

Binomial name
- Astroblepus cirratus (Regan, 1912)

Synonyms
- Arges cirratus Regan, 1912

Species of fish

Astroblepus cirratus is a species of freshwater ray-finned fish belonging to the family Astroblepidae, the climbing catfishes. This catfish is found in the Dagua River basin, San Juan River basin, and Magdalena-Cauca basins, and in some Pacific coastal drainages, in Colombia. This species attains a maximum standard length of 5.5 cm (2.2 in).

== Bibliography ==
- Eschmeyer, William N., ed. 1998. Catalog of Fishes. Special Publication of the Center for Biodiversity Research and Information, num. 1, vol. 1–3. California Academy of Sciences. San Francisco, California, United States. 2905. ISBN 0-940228-47-5.
