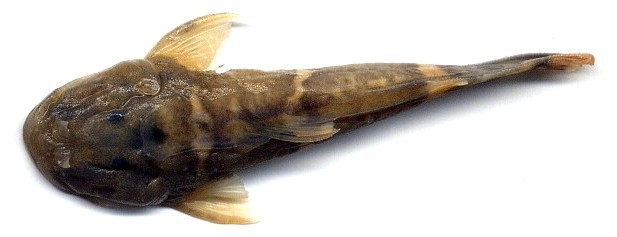
- Astroblepus trifasciatus

Conservation status
- Least Concern (IUCN 3.1)

Scientific classification
- Kingdom: Animalia
- Phylum: Chordata
- Class: Actinopterygii
- Order: Siluriformes
- Family: Astroblepidae
- Genus: Astroblepus
- Species: A. trifasciatus

Binomial name
- Astroblepus trifasciatus (C. H. Eigenmann, 1912)

Synonyms
- Cyclopium trifasciatum Eigenmann, 1912

= Astroblepus trifasciatus =

Species of fish

Astroblepus trifasciatus is a species of freshwater ray-finned fish belonging to the family Astroblepidae, the climbing catfishes. This catfish is endemic to Colombia, where it is found in the Patia, Magdalena and Cauca River basins, it has been recorded from both the Pacific and Caribbean slope rivers. This species attains a maximum standard length of 9 cm (3.5 in).

== Bibliography ==
- Eschmeyer, William N., ed. 1998. Catalog of Fishes. Special Publication of the Center for Biodiversity Research and Information, num. 1, vol. 1–3. California Academy of Sciences. San Francisco, California, United States. 2905. ISBN 0-940228-47-5.
