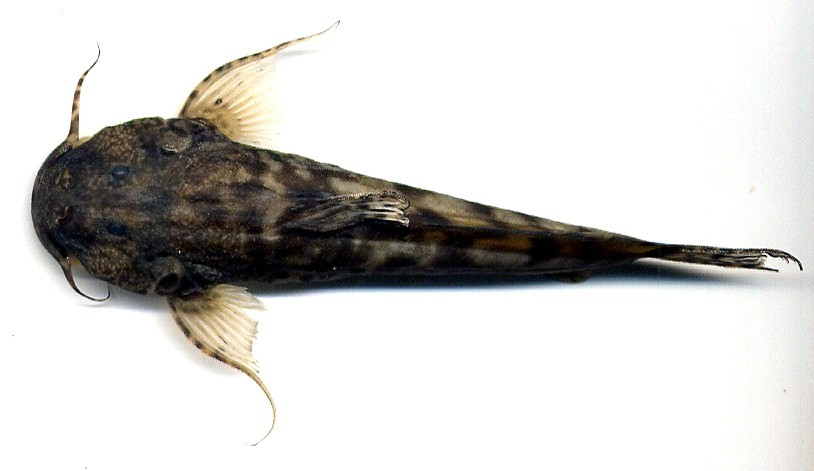

Conservation status
- Least Concern (IUCN 3.1)

Scientific classification
- Kingdom: Animalia
- Phylum: Chordata
- Class: Actinopterygii
- Order: Siluriformes
- Family: Astroblepidae
- Genus: Astroblepus
- Species: A. micrescens

Binomial name
- Astroblepus micrescens C. H. Eigenmann, 1918

Synonyms
- Astroblepus grixalvi micrescens C. H. Eigenmann, 1918

= Astroblepus micrescens =

Species of fish

Astroblepus micrescens is a species of freshwater ray-finned fish belonging to the family Astroblepidae, the climbing catfishes. This catfish is found in South America where it occurs in torrential rivers with stony riverbeds where there is an abundance of organic material and anthropegenic matter. It can be found in creeks and tributaries of rivers in areas where there is human influence at elevations of more than 1,200 m (3,900 ft). This species is endemic to Colombia in the Magdalena River basin. A. micrescens attains a maximum size of 13 cm (5.1 in).

== Bibliography ==
- Eschmeyer, William N., ed. 1998. Catalog of Fishes. Special Publication of the Center for Biodiversity Research and Information, num. 1, vol. 1–3. California Academy of Sciences. San Francisco, California, United States. 2905. ISBN 0-940228-47-5.
