= Astroblepus labialis =

Conservation status
- Data Deficient (IUCN 3.1).

Scientific classification
- Kingdom: Animalia
- Phylum: Chordata
- Class: Actinopterygii
- Order: Siluriformes
- Family: Astroblepidae
- Genus: Astroblepus
- Species: A. labialis

Binomial name
- Astroblepus labialis N. E. Pearson, 1937

Species of fish

Astroblepus labialis is a species of freshwater ray-finned fish belonging to the family Astroblepidae, the climbing catfishes. This catfish is found in South America in Peru where it has been recorded from the Marañón River, the type locality, and Huánuco. This species attains a maximum standard length of 7 cm (2.8 in).

== Bibliography ==
- Eschmeyer, William N., ed. 1998. Catalog of Fishes. Special Publication of the Center for Biodiversity Research and Information, num. 1, vol. 1–3. California Academy of Sciences. San Francisco, California, United States. 2905. ISBN 0-940228-47-5.
