= Astroblepus longiceps =

Conservation status
- Data Deficient (IUCN 3.1).

Scientific classification
- Kingdom: Animalia
- Phylum: Chordata
- Class: Actinopterygii
- Order: Siluriformes
- Family: Astroblepidae
- Genus: Astroblepus
- Species: A. longiceps

Binomial name
- Astroblepus longiceps N. E. Pearson, 1924

Species of fish

Astroblepus longiceps is a species of freshwater ray-finned fish belonging to the family Astroblepidae, the climbing catfishes. This catfish is found in South America, where it is known with certainty only from the upper drainage system of the Beni River in Bolivia; reports from Peru require confirmation. It is found at altitudes between 400 and 2,700 m (1,300 and 8,900 ft) in mountain streams and rivers. This species reaches a maximum standard length of 6 cm (2.4 in).

== Bibliography ==
- Eschmeyer, William N., ed. 1998. Catalog of Fishes. Special Publication of the Center for Biodiversity Research and Information, num. 1, vol. 1–3. California Academy of Sciences. San Francisco, California, United States. 2905. ISBN 0-940228-47-5.
