= Astroblepus latidens =

Conservation status
- Vulnerable (IUCN 3.1)

Scientific classification
- Kingdom: Animalia
- Phylum: Chordata
- Class: Actinopterygii
- Order: Siluriformes
- Family: Astroblepidae
- Genus: Astroblepus
- Species: A. latidens

Binomial name
- Astroblepus latidens C. H. Eigenmann, 1918

Species of fish

Astroblepus latidens is a species of freshwater ray-finned fish belonging to the family Astroblepidae, the climbing catfishes. This catfish is found in South America, where it is endemic to the Magdalena-Cauca river systems of Colombia. It inhabits rainforest streams with high oxygen levels in ravines and rivers. It is a carnivorous species which reaches a maximum standard length of 8 cm (3.1 in).

== Bibliography ==
- Eschmeyer, William N., ed. 1998. Catalog of Fishes. Special Publication of the Center for Biodiversity Research and Information, num. 1, vol. 1–3. California Academy of Sciences. San Francisco, California, United States. 2905. ISBN 0-940228-47-5.
