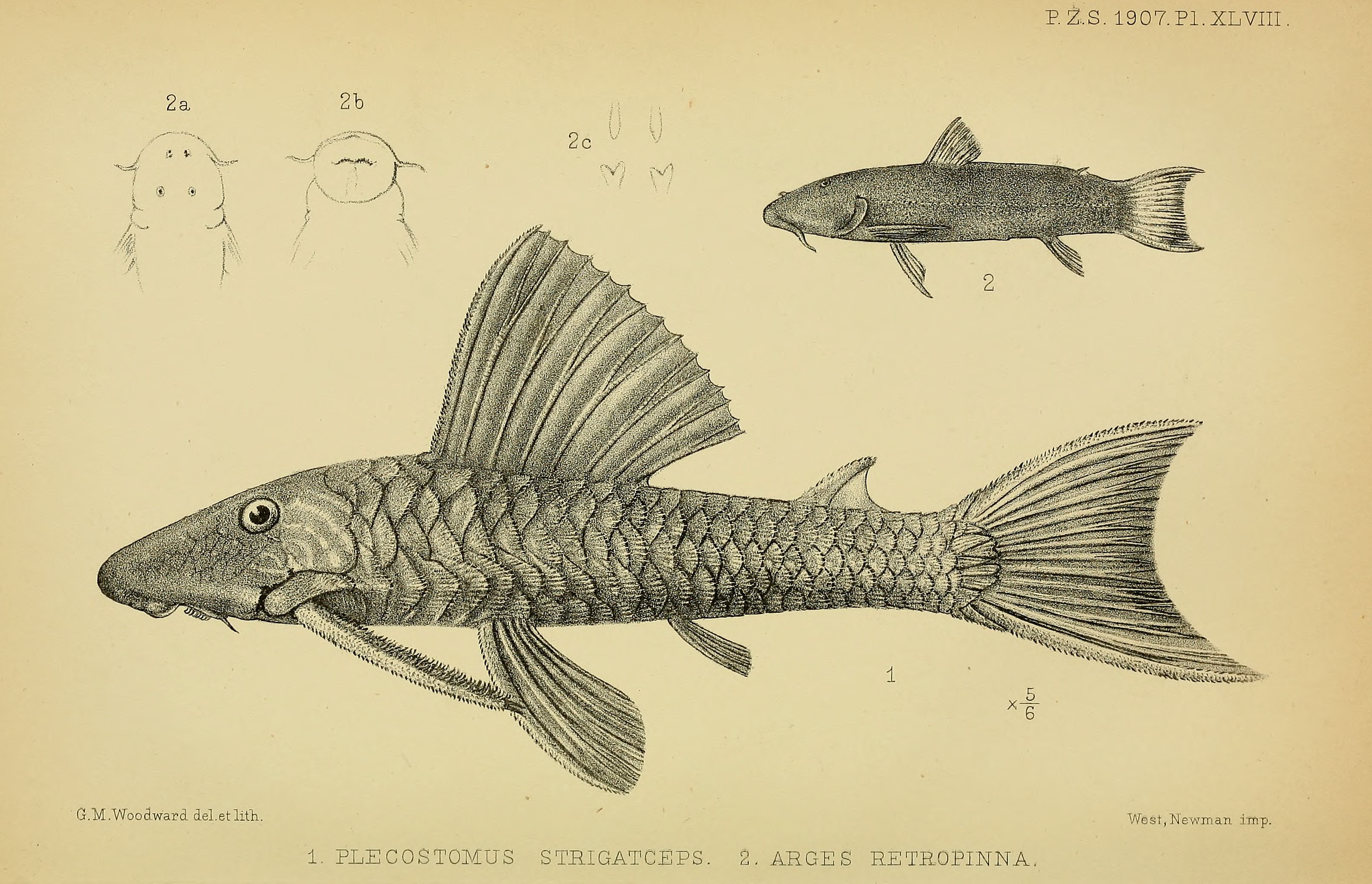
- Astroblepus retropinnus top

Conservation status
- Least Concern (IUCN 3.1)

Scientific classification
- Kingdom: Animalia
- Phylum: Chordata
- Class: Actinopterygii
- Order: Siluriformes
- Family: Astroblepidae
- Genus: Astroblepus
- Species: A. retropinnus

Binomial name
- Astroblepus retropinnus (Regan, 1908)

Synonyms
- Arges retropinnis Regan, 1908

= Astroblepus retropinnus =

Species of fish

Astroblepus retropinnus is a species of freshwater ray-finned fish belonging to the family Astroblepidae, the climbing catfishes. This catfish is found in South America where it occurs in the Dagua River basin and Janambú River, in the Patía River basin in Nariño, in the Atrato River basin, as well as in the Cubarradó River, part of the Purrichá River basin. This species attains a maximum standard length of 7 cm (2.8 in).

== Bibliography ==
- Eschmeyer, William N., ed. 1998. Catalog of Fishes. Special Publication of the Center for Biodiversity Research and Information, num. 1, vol. 1–3. California Academy of Sciences. San Francisco, California, United States. 2905. ISBN 0-940228-47-5.
