= Astroblepus supramollis =

Conservation status
- Vulnerable (IUCN 3.1)

Scientific classification
- Kingdom: Animalia
- Phylum: Chordata
- Class: Actinopterygii
- Order: Siluriformes
- Family: Astroblepidae
- Genus: Astroblepus
- Species: A. supramollis

Binomial name
- Astroblepus supramollis N. E. Pearson, 1937

Species of fish

Astroblepus supramollis is a species of freshwater ray-finned fish belonging to the family Astroblepidae, the climbing catfishes. This catfish is found in Marañón River basin of Peru (Schaefer 2003), and in the Río Nangarizta and Cordillera del Cóndor in Ecuador and Peru. This species attains a maximum standard length of 8 cm (3.1 in).

== Bibliography ==
- Eschmeyer, William N., ed. 1998. Catalog of Fishes. Special Publication of the Center for Biodiversity Research and Information, num. 1, vol. 1–3. California Academy of Sciences. San Francisco, California, United States. 2905. ISBN 0-940228-47-5.
