= Joseph Nelson Rose =

American botanist (1862–1928)

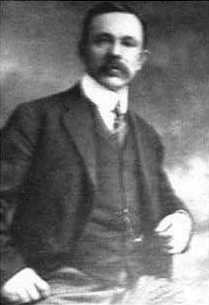
- Born: January 11, 1862; Union County, Indiana
- Died: May 4, 1928 (aged 66); Washington D. C.
- Resting place: Rock Creek Cemetery
- Education: Wabash College
- Scientific career
- Fields: botanist
- Institutions: United States Department of Agriculture, Smithsonian Institution
- Author abbrev. (botany): Rose

Joseph Nelson Rose (January 11, 1862 – May 4, 1928) was an American botanist. He was born in Union County, Indiana. His father died serving during the Civil War when Joseph Rose was a young boy. He later graduated from high school in Liberty, Indiana.

He received his Ph.D. in Biology from Wabash College in 1889. having received his B.A. in Biology and M.A. Paleobotany earlier at the same institute. He married Lou Beatrice Sims in 1888 and produced with her three sons and three daughters.

Rose worked for the U.S. Department of Agriculture and became an assistant curator at the Smithsonian in 1896.

While Rose was employed by the national museum, he was an authority on several plants families, including Apiaceae (Parsley Family) and Cactaceae (Cactus Family). He made several field trips to Mexico, and presented specimens to the Smithsonian and the New York Botanical Garden.

With Nathaniel Lord Britton, Rose published many articles on the Crassulaceae. He took a leave of absence from the Smithsonian to do further fieldwork in South America and publish with Britton, the four-volume work, The Cactaceae (1919–1923), illustrated by Mary Emily Eaton (1873–1961).

Rose returned to work afterwards at the Smithsonian, making further contributions to Botany.

The standard author abbreviation Rose is used to indicate this person as the author when citing a botanical name.

== Honors ==
Astroblepus rosei is a species of catfish of the family Astroblepidae that was named after Rose. It can be found on Cajamarca, Peru.

In 1890, botanist S.Watson published Rhodosciadium, a genus of flowering plants from Mexico and Guatemala, belonging to the family Apiaceae and named in Rose's honor.
