= Astroblepus santanderensis =

Conservation status
- Data Deficient (IUCN 3.1)

Scientific classification
- Kingdom: Animalia
- Phylum: Chordata
- Class: Actinopterygii
- Order: Siluriformes
- Family: Astroblepidae
- Genus: Astroblepus
- Species: A. santanderensis

Binomial name
- Astroblepus santanderensis (C. H. Eigenmann, 1918)

Synonyms
- Astroblepus cyclopus var. santanderensis C. H. Eigenmann, 1918

Species of catfish

Astroblepus santanderensis is a species of freshwater ray-finned fish belonging to the family Astroblepidae, the climbing catfishes. This catfish is found in South America where it is endemic to Colombia, occurring in the Magdalena River and Suarez River basins. This species attains a maximum standard length of 8 cm (3.1 in).

== Bibliography ==
- Eschmeyer, William N., ed. 1998. Catalog of Fishes. Special Publication of the Center for Biodiversity Research and Information, num. 1, vol. 1–3. California Academy of Sciences. San Francisco, California, United States. 2905. ISBN 0-940228-47-5.
