= Astroblepus rosei =

Conservation status
- Data Deficient (IUCN 3.1)

Scientific classification
- Kingdom: Animalia
- Phylum: Chordata
- Class: Actinopterygii
- Order: Siluriformes
- Family: Astroblepidae
- Genus: Astroblepus
- Species: A. rosei

Binomial name
- Astroblepus rosei C. H. Eigenmann, 1922

Species of fish

Astroblepus rosei is a species of freshwater ray-finned fish belonging to the family Astroblepidae, the climbing catfishes. This catfish is found in the Jequetepeque River, a Pacific coastal draining river in Peru and in Andean rivers of Colombia where it occurs at altitudes between 1,000 and 2,000 m (3,300 and 6,600 ft). This species attains a maximum standard length of 10 cm (3.9 in).

The specific name honors the botanist Joseph Nelson Rose of the United States National Museum.

== Bibliography ==
- Eschmeyer, William N., ed. 1998. Catalog of Fishes. Special Publication of the Center for Biodiversity Research and Information, num. 1, vol. 1–3. California Academy of Sciences. San Francisco, California, United States. 2905. ISBN 0-940228-47-5.
