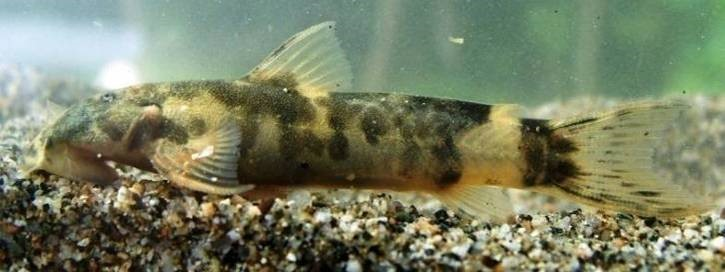

Conservation status
- Least Concern (IUCN 3.1)

Scientific classification
- Kingdom: Animalia
- Phylum: Chordata
- Class: Actinopterygii
- Order: Siluriformes
- Family: Astroblepidae
- Genus: Astroblepus
- Species: A. chapmani

Binomial name
- Astroblepus chapmani (C. H. Eigenmann, 1912)

Synonyms
- Cyclopium chapmani C. H. Eigenmann, 1912

= Astroblepus chapmani =

Species of fish

Astroblepus chapmani is a species of freshwater ray-finned fish belonging to the family Astroblepidae, the climbing catfishes. This catfish is found in the Magdalena, Cauca and San Juan rivers in Colombia. This fish attains a maximum standard length of 12.3 cm (4.8 in).

Although the patronym in the specific name was not identified, Eigenmann mentioned a "Dr. F. M. Chapman" in a later (1942) publication, who was a traveling companion in South America; this may have been ornithologist Frank M. Chapman, of the American Museum of Natural History.

== Bibliography ==
- Eschmeyer, William N., ed. 1998. Catalog of Fishes. Special Publication of the Center for Biodiversity Research and Information, num. 1, vol. 1–3. California Academy of Sciences. San Francisco, California, United States. 2905. ISBN 0-940228-47-5.
