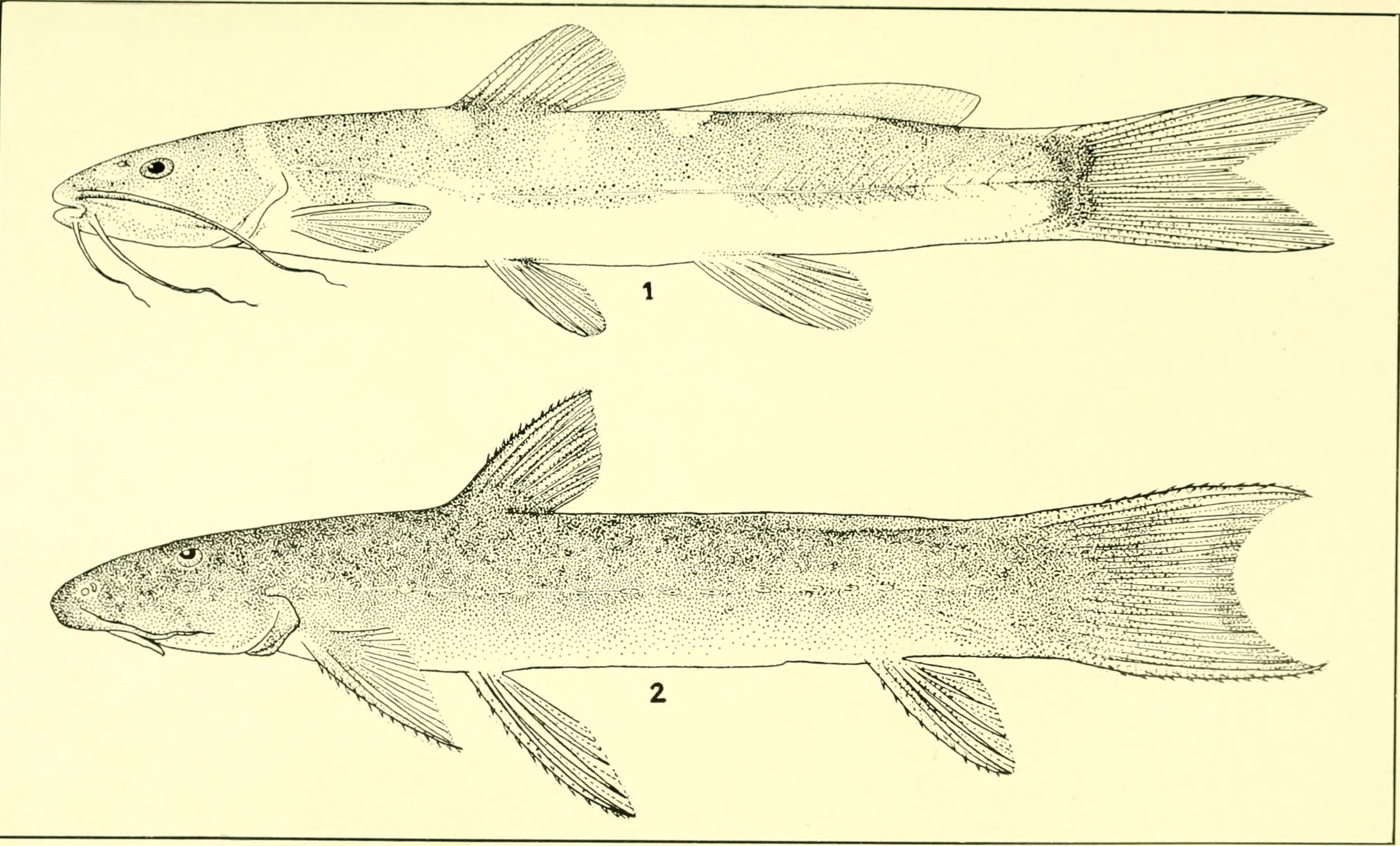
- Astroblepus vanceae below

Conservation status
- Data Deficient (IUCN 3.1)

Scientific classification
- Kingdom: Animalia
- Phylum: Chordata
- Class: Actinopterygii
- Order: Siluriformes
- Family: Astroblepidae
- Genus: Astroblepus
- Species: A. vanceae

Binomial name
- Astroblepus vanceae (C. H. Eigenmann, 1913)

Synonyms
- Cyclopium vanceae Eigenmann, 1913

= Astroblepus vanceae =

Species of fish

Astroblepus vanceae is a species of freshwater ray-finned fish belonging to the family Astroblepidae, the climbing catfishes. This catfish is found in South America where it occurs in small, high altitude streams in the Andean Amazon basin of Peru. This species attains a maximum standard length of 8 cm (3.1 in).

The specific name, vanceae, honors Miss Lola E. Vance (1884-1984), later Mrs. Jacob Lievense, who gave Eigenmann a small collection of fishes from Peru, which included the holotype of this species.

== Bibliography ==
- Eschmeyer, William N., ed. 1998. Catalog of Fishes. Special Publication of the Center for Biodiversity Research and Information, num. 1, vol. 1–3. California Academy of Sciences. San Francisco, California, United States. 2905. ISBN 0-940228-47-5.
