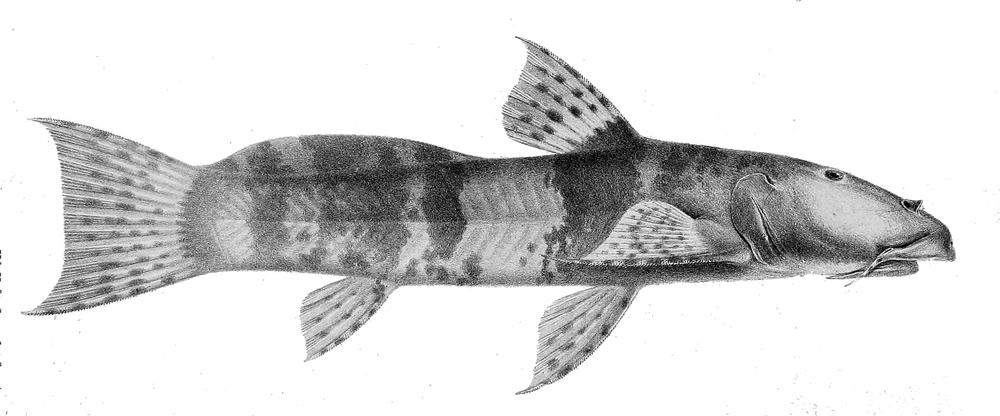

Conservation status
- Data Deficient (IUCN 3.1)

Scientific classification
- Kingdom: Animalia
- Phylum: Chordata
- Class: Actinopterygii
- Order: Siluriformes
- Family: Astroblepidae
- Genus: Astroblepus
- Species: A. sabalo

Binomial name
- Astroblepus sabalo (Valenciennes, 1840)

Synonyms
- Arges sabalo Valenciennes, 1840

= Astroblepus sabalo =

Species of fish

Astroblepus sabalo is a species of freshwater ray-finned fish belonging to the family Astroblepidae, the climbing catfishes. This catfish is found in South America where it is found in the Amazon basin in Peru. This species attains a maximum standard length of 22 cm (8.7 in).

== Bibliography ==
- Eschmeyer, William N., ed. 1998. Catalog of Fishes. Special Publication of the Center for Biodiversity Research and Information, num. 1, vol. 1–3. California Academy of Sciences. San Francisco, California, United States. 2905. ISBN 0-940228-47-5.
