= Astroblepus chotae =

Conservation status
- Least Concern (IUCN 3.1)

Scientific classification
- Kingdom: Animalia
- Phylum: Chordata
- Class: Actinopterygii
- Order: Siluriformes
- Family: Astroblepidae
- Genus: Astroblepus
- Species: A. chotae

Binomial name
- Astroblepus chotae (Regan, 1904)

Synonyms
- Arges chotae Regan, 1904

Species of fish

Astroblepus chotae is a species of freshwater ray-finned fish belonging to the family Astroblepidae, the climbing catfishes. This catfish is found in springs in the northwestern Andes Mountains of Colombia, Ecuador and Venezuela, in river systems draining to both the Pacific Ocean and Caribbean Sea. This species attains a maximum total length of 10 cm (3.9 in).

== Bibliography ==
- Eschmeyer, William N., ed. 1998. Catalog of Fishes. Special Publication of the Center for Biodiversity Research and Information, num. 1, vol. 1–3. California Academy of Sciences. San Francisco, California, United States. 2905. ISBN 0-940228-47-5.
