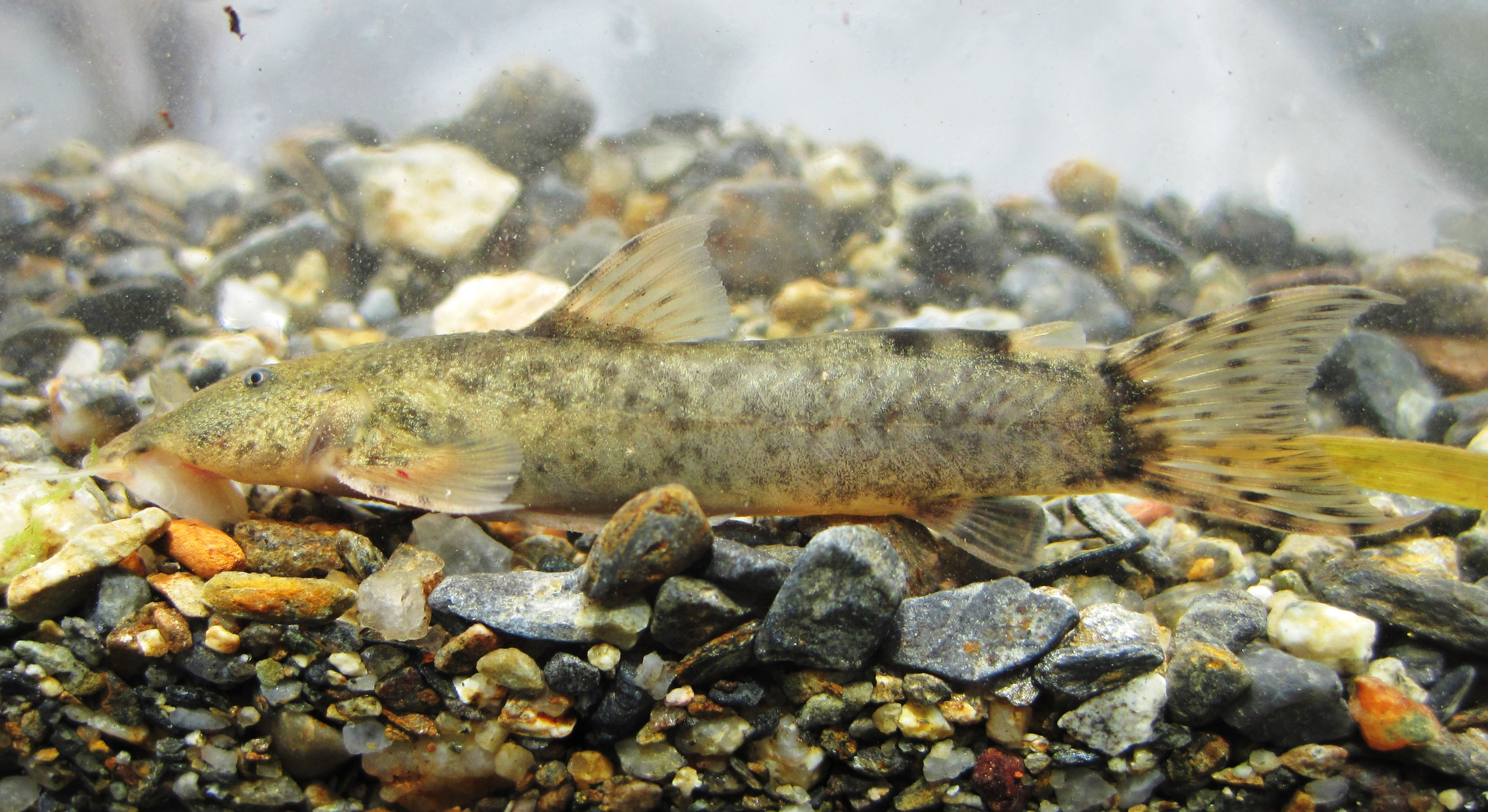

Conservation status
- Least Concern (IUCN 3.1)

Scientific classification
- Kingdom: Animalia
- Phylum: Chordata
- Class: Actinopterygii
- Order: Siluriformes
- Family: Astroblepidae
- Genus: Astroblepus
- Species: A. homodon

Binomial name
- Astroblepus homodon (Regan, 1904)

Synonyms
- Arges homodon Regan, 1904

= Astroblepus homodon =

Species of fish

Astroblepus homodon is a species of freshwater ray-finned fish belonging to the family Astroblepidae, the climbing catfishes. This catfish is found in South America where it is endemic to Colombia, where it is found in the Magdalena-Cauca rivers and Pacific slope river basins, occurring at altitudes between 480 and 2,000 metres (1,570 and 6,560 ft) in clear, fast flowing streams. This species has a maximum standard length of 8 cm (3.1 in).

== Bibliography ==
- Eschmeyer, William N., ed. 1998. Catalog of Fishes. Special Publication of the Center for Biodiversity Research and Information, num. 1, vol. 1–3. California Academy of Sciences. San Francisco, California, United States. 2905. ISBN 0-940228-47-5.
