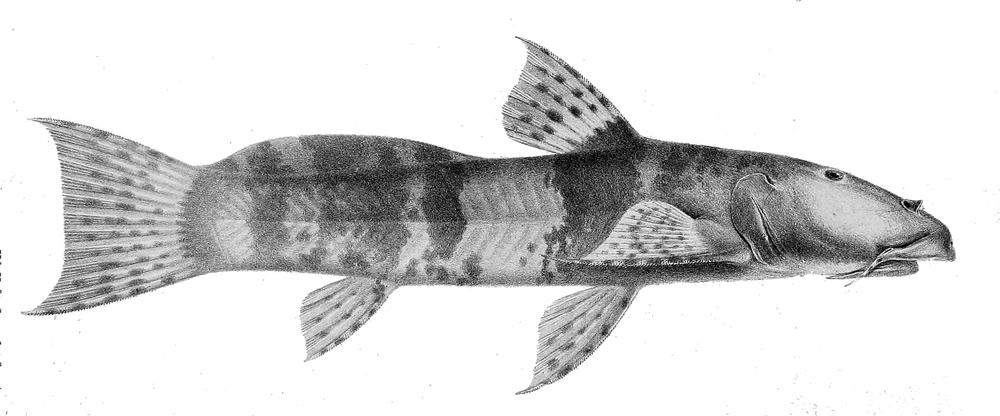
- Astroblepus sabalo

Scientific classification
- Kingdom: Animalia
- Phylum: Chordata
- Class: Actinopterygii
- Order: Siluriformes
- Suborder: Loricarioidei
- Family: Astroblepidae; Bleeker, 1862
- Genus: Astroblepus; Humboldt, 1805

Type species
- Astroblepus grixalvii Humboldt, 1805

Synonyms
- Cyclopium Swainson, 1838; Arges Valenciennes, 1840; Brontes Valenciennes, 1840; Strephon Gistel, 1848; Stygogenes Günther, 1864

= Astroblepus =

Genus of fishes

Astroblepus is a genus of freshwater ray-finned fishes belonging to the family Astroblepidae, the climbing catfishes or naked sucker-mouth catfishes. This genus is the only genus in its family. These catfishes are primarily found in torrential streams in the Andean area. Astroblepus pholeter and A. riberae are troglobites adapted to living in subterranean water systems. These species are typically small, less than 10 cm (4 in). The largest species reaches 30 cm (1 ft). These fish have suckermouths like those of loricariids. They have two pairs of barbels, maxillary and nasal. The dorsal fin spine lacks a locking mechanism. These fish also have odontodes, tiny teeth on their skin. All species exhibit a conical, pointy type on their fin rays like that found in other loricarioids; other species also exhibit a blunt type that is only found on their skin.

Some of these fish are able to live in high altitude and climb the faces of waterfalls. Their climbing ability comes from specially developed pelvic fins, as well as their suckermouths. In their Neotropical Andean habitat, dry and wet seasons are quite extreme, and odontodes may help in sensing food, mates and water flow, as well as help cling to surfaces. They feed upon invertebrates, such as caterpillars and annelids.

The Astroblepidae were usually placed within Siluriformes as the sister family of Loricariidae, but a recent study found them to be more closely related to the family Scoloplacidae.

== Species ==
Astroblepus contains the following valid species:

- Astroblepus acostai Ardila Rodríguez, 2011
- Astroblepus ardiladuartei Ardila Rodríguez, 2015
- Astroblepus ardilai Ardila Rodríguez, 2012
- Astroblepus bellezaensis Ardila Rodríguez, 2015
- Astroblepus boulengeri (Regan, 1904)
- Astroblepus brachycephalus (Günther, 1859)
- Astroblepus cacharas Ardila Rodríguez, 2011
- Astroblepus cajamarcaensis Ardila Rodríguez, 2013
- Astroblepus caquetae Fowler, 1943
- Astroblepus chapmani (C. H. Eigenmann, 1912)
- Astroblepus chimborazoi (Fowler, 1915)
- Astroblepus chinchaoensis Ardila Rodríguez, 2014
- Astroblepus chotae (Regan, 1904)
- Astroblepus cirratus (Regan, 1912)
- Astroblepus curitiensis Ardila Rodríguez, 2015
- Astroblepus cyclopus (Humboldt, 1805)
- Astroblepus dux Posada, 1909
- Astroblepus eigenmanni (Regan, 1904)
- Astroblepus festae (Boulenger, 1898)
- Astroblepus fissidens (Regan, 1904)
- Astroblepus floridablancaensis Ardila Rodríguez, 2016
- Astroblepus floridaensis Ardila Rodríguez, 2013
- Astroblepus formosus Fowler, 1945
- Astroblepus frenatus C. H. Eigenmann, 1918
- Astroblepus grixalvii Humboldt, 1805
- Astroblepus guentheri (Boulenger, 1887)
- Astroblepus heterodon (Regan, 1908)
- Astroblepus hidalgoi Ardila Rodríguez, 2013
- Astroblepus homodon (Regan, 1904)
- Astroblepus huallagaensis Ardila Rodríguez, 2013
- Astroblepus itae Ardila Rodríguez, 2011
- Astroblepus jimenezae Ardila Rodríguez, 2013
- Astroblepus jurubidae Fowler, 1944
- Astroblepus labialis N. E. Pearson, 1937
- Astroblepus latidens C. H. Eigenmann, 1918
- Astroblepus longiceps N. E. Pearson, 1924
- Astroblepus longifilis (Steindachner, 1882)
- Astroblepus mancoi C. H. Eigenmann, 1928
- Astroblepus mariae (Fowler, 1919)
- Astroblepus marmoratus (Regan, 1904)
- Astroblepus martinezi Ardila Rodríguez, 2013
- Astroblepus mendezi Ardila Rodríguez, 2014
- Astroblepus micrescens C. H. Eigenmann, 1918
- Astroblepus mindoensis (Regan, 1916)
- Astroblepus mojicai Ardila Rodríguez, 2015
- Astroblepus moyanensis Ardila Rodríguez, 2014
- Astroblepus nettoferreirai Ardila Rodríguez, 2015
- Astroblepus nicefori G. S. Myers, 1932
- Astroblepus onzagaensis Ardila Rodríguez, 2015
- Astroblepus orientalis (Boulenger, 1903)
- Astroblepus ortegai Ardila Rodríguez, 2012
- Astroblepus peruanus (Steindachner, 1876)
- Astroblepus phelpsi L. P. Schultz, 1944
- Astroblepus pholeter Collette, 1962
- Astroblepus pirrensis (Meek & Hildebrand, 1913)
- Astroblepus pradai Ardila Rodríguez, 2015
- Astroblepus praeliorum W. R. Allen, 1942
- Astroblepus prenadillus (Valenciennes, 1840)
- Astroblepus putumayoensis Ardila Rodríguez, 2015
- Astroblepus quispei Ardila Rodríguez, 2012
- Astroblepus regani (Pellegrin, 1909)
- Astroblepus rengifoi Dahl, 1960
- Astroblepus retropinnus (Regan, 1908)
- Astroblepus riberae Cardona & Guerao, 1994
- Astroblepus rivasae Ardila Rodríguez, 2018
- Astroblepus rosei C. H. Eigenmann, 1922
- Astroblepus sabalo (Valenciennes, 1840)
- Astroblepus santanderensis C. H. Eigenmann, 1918
- Astroblepus simonsii (Regan, 1904)
- Astroblepus stuebeli (Wandolleck, 1916)
- Astroblepus supramollis N. E. Pearson, 1937
- Astroblepus taczanowskii (Boulenger, 1890)
- Astroblepus tamboensis Ardila Rodríguez, 2014
- Astroblepus theresiae (Steindachner, 1907)
- Astroblepus trifasciatus (C. H. Eigenmann, 1912)
- Astroblepus ubidiai (Pellegrin, 1931)
- Astroblepus unifasciatus (C. H. Eigenmann, 1912)
- Astroblepus vaillanti (Regan, 1904)
- Astroblepus vanceae (C. H. Eigenmann, 1913)
- Astroblepus ventralis (C. H. Eigenmann, 1912)
- Astroblepus verai Ardila Rodríguez, 2015
- Astroblepus whymperi (Boulenger, 1890)
