= Astroblepus riberae =

Conservation status
- Data Deficient (IUCN 3.1)

Scientific classification
- Kingdom: Animalia
- Phylum: Chordata
- Class: Actinopterygii
- Order: Siluriformes
- Family: Astroblepidae
- Genus: Astroblepus
- Species: A. riberae

Binomial name
- Astroblepus riberae Cardona & Guerao, 1994

Species of fish

Astroblepus riberae is a species of freshwater ray-finned fish belonging to the family Astroblepidae, the climbing catfishes. This cavefish is endemic to the Cajamarca region in Peru, where it is known only from its type locality, the only Ninabamba Cave at 6°19'48"S, 78°30'36"W. This cave is in the Reque River basin, part of the Peruvian Amazon basin.

The specific name honors Carles Ribera of the University of Barcelona, a specialist in cavernicolous spiders, who collected the holotype from Ninabamba caves in Peru.
