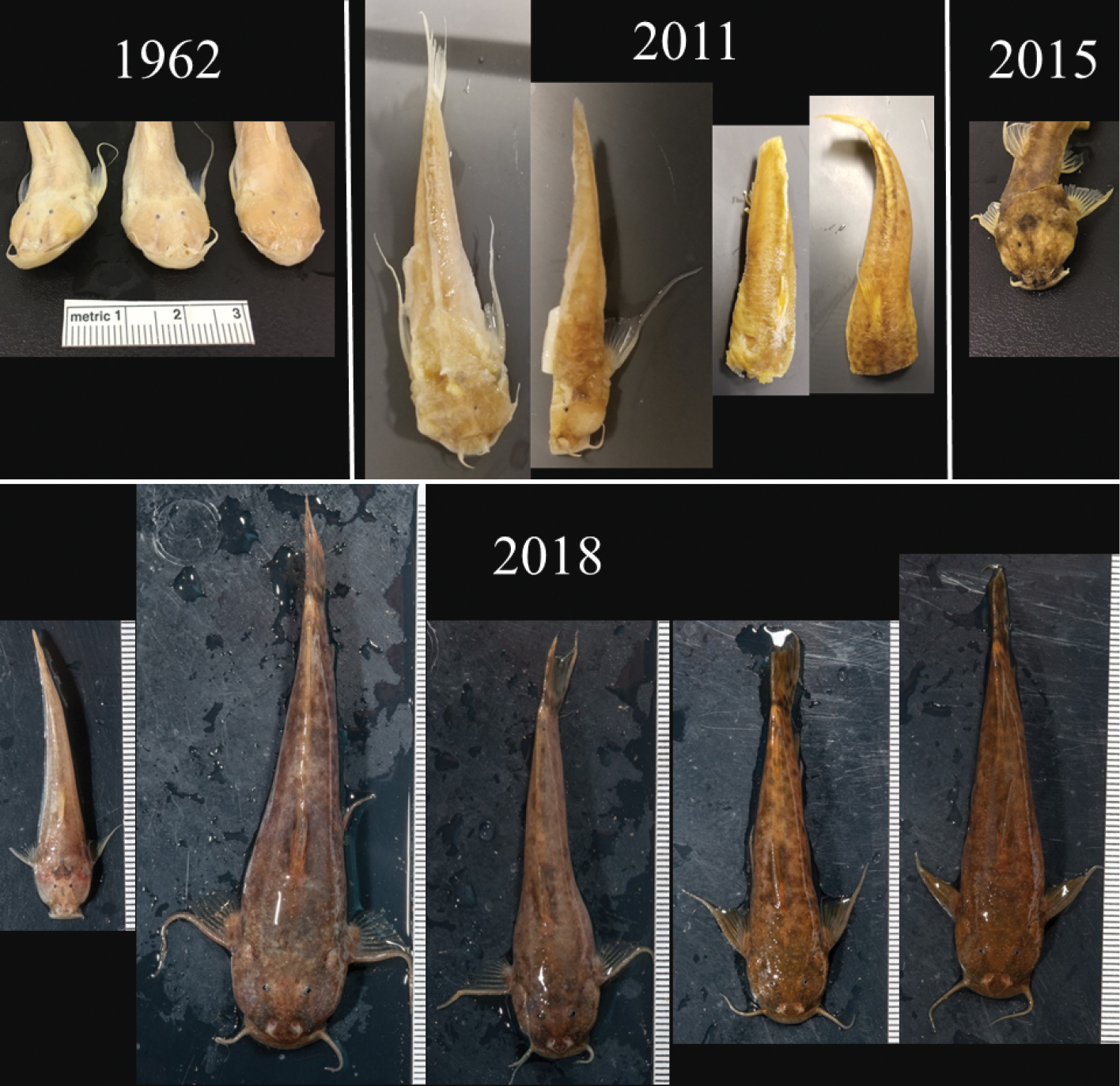

Conservation status
- Near Threatened (IUCN 3.1)

Scientific classification
- Kingdom: Animalia
- Phylum: Chordata
- Class: Actinopterygii
- Order: Siluriformes
- Family: Astroblepidae
- Genus: Astroblepus
- Species: A. pholeter

Binomial name
- Astroblepus pholeter Collette, 1962

= Astroblepus pholeter =

Species of fish

Astroblepus pholeter is a species of freshwater ray-finned fish belonging to the family Astroblepidae, the climbing catfishes. This cavefish is endemic to the Jumandi Cave in the Napo River basin in Ecuador. The fish has numerous skin denticles that can sense the flow of water. This species reaches a maximum standard length of 7 cm (2.8 in).

== Bibliography ==
- Eschmeyer, William N., ed. 1998. Catalog of Fishes. Special Publication of the Center for Biodiversity Research and Information, num. 1, vol. 1–3. California Academy of Sciences. San Francisco, California, United States. 2905. ISBN 0-940228-47-5.
