= Astroblepus chimborazoi =

Conservation status
- Data Deficient (IUCN 3.1)

Scientific classification
- Kingdom: Animalia
- Phylum: Chordata
- Class: Actinopterygii
- Order: Siluriformes
- Family: Astroblepidae
- Genus: Astroblepus
- Species: A. chimborazoi

Binomial name
- Astroblepus chimborazoi (Fowler, 1915)

Synonyms
- Cyclopium chimborazoi Fowler, 1915

Species of fish

Astroblepus chimborazoi is a species of freshwater ray-finned fish belonging to the family Astroblepidae, the climbing catfishes. This catfish is found in the Chanchán, Chiguancay, and Chimbo rivers in the Guayas River system, draining into the Pacific Ocean, in Ecuador. This species attains a maximum standard length of 2.5 cm (0.98 in).

== Bibliography ==
- Eschmeyer, William N., ed. 1998. Catalog of Fishes. Special Publication of the Center for Biodiversity Research and Information, num. 1, vol. 1–3. California Academy of Sciences. San Francisco, California, United States. 2905. ISBN 0-940228-47-5.
