= Astroblepus nicefori =

Conservation status
- Data Deficient (IUCN 3.1).

Scientific classification
- Kingdom: Animalia
- Phylum: Chordata
- Class: Actinopterygii
- Order: Siluriformes
- Family: Astroblepidae
- Genus: Astroblepus
- Species: A. nicefori

Binomial name
- Astroblepus nicefori G. S. Myers, 1932

Species of fish

Astroblepus nicefori is a species of freshwater ray-finned fish belonging to the family Astroblepidae, the climbing catfishes. This catfish is found in South America where it occurs in Sonsón in Antioquia, in the Magdalena and Cauca river basins and in the San Juan River, which drains into the Pacific. This species occurs in sandy or rocky rivers with torrential flows and abundant periphyton. A. nicefori attains a maximum standard length of 7.0 cm (2.8 in).

== Etymology ==
The specific name, nicefori, honors Brother Hermano Nicéforo María, Museo del Instituto de La Salle, Bogotá; a Frenchman originally named Antoine Rouhaire Siauzade who became a missionary in Colombia under his monastic name, he sent a collection of Colombian freshwater fishes to Myers, including the type specimen of this one.

== Bibliography ==
- Eschmeyer, William N., ed. 1998. Catalog of Fishes. Special Publication of the Center for Biodiversity Research and Information, num. 1, vol. 1–3. California Academy of Sciences. San Francisco, California, United States. 2905. ISBN 0-940228-47-5.
