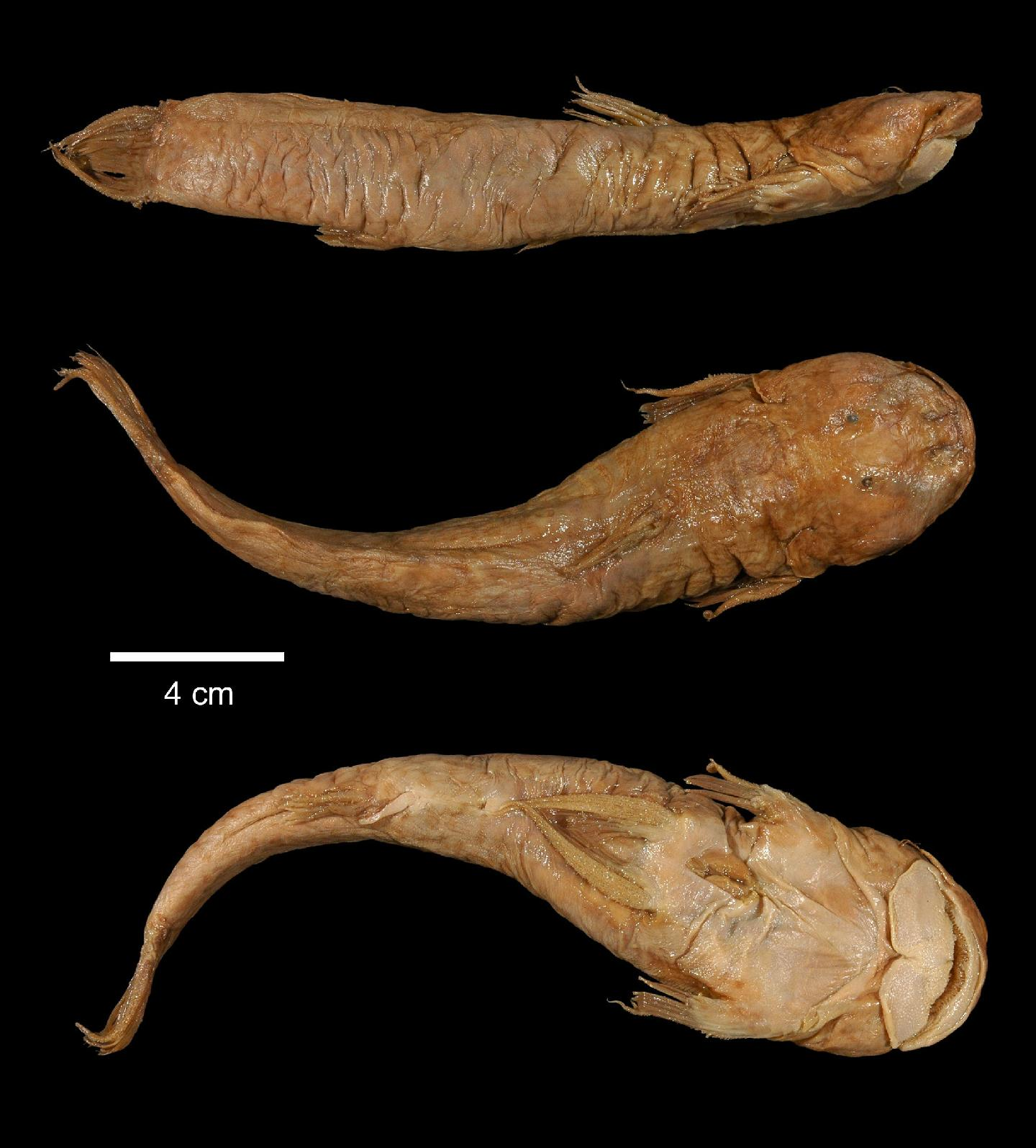

Conservation status
- Least Concern (IUCN 3.1)

Scientific classification
- Kingdom: Animalia
- Phylum: Chordata
- Class: Actinopterygii
- Order: Siluriformes
- Family: Astroblepidae
- Genus: Astroblepus
- Species: A. brachycephalus

Binomial name
- Astroblepus brachycephalus (Günther, 1859)

Synonyms
- Arges brachycephalus Günther, 1859

= Astroblepus brachycephalus =

Species of fish

Astroblepus brachycephalus is a species of freshwater ray-finned fish belonging to the family Astroblepidae, the climbing catfishes. This catfish is found in the Cayapas, Esmeraldas and Guayas river systems in Ecuador; these rivers drain into the Pacific Ocean. This species attains a maximum standard length of 20 cm (7.9 in).

== Bibliography ==
- Eschmeyer, William N., ed. 1998. Catalog of Fishes. Special Publication of the Center for Biodiversity Research and Information, num. 1, vol. 1–3. California Academy of Sciences. San Francisco, California, United States. 2905. ISBN 0-940228-47-5.
