= Astroblepus eigenmanni =

Scientific classification
- Kingdom: Animalia
- Phylum: Chordata
- Class: Actinopterygii
- Order: Siluriformes
- Family: Astroblepidae
- Genus: Astroblepus
- Species: A. eigenmanni

Binomial name
- Astroblepus eigenmanni (Regan, 1904)

Synonyms
- Arges eigenmanni Regan, 1904

Species of fish

Astroblepus eigenmanni is a species of freshwater ray-finned fish belonging to the family Astroblepidae, the climbing catfishes. This catfish is found in the Pacific coastal drainages of Ecuador.

The specific name honours the German-born American ichthyologist Carl H. Eigenmann, who lent the describer of this species, Charles Tate Regan, specimens, and who reported this species as Cyclopium cyclopum in 1888.
