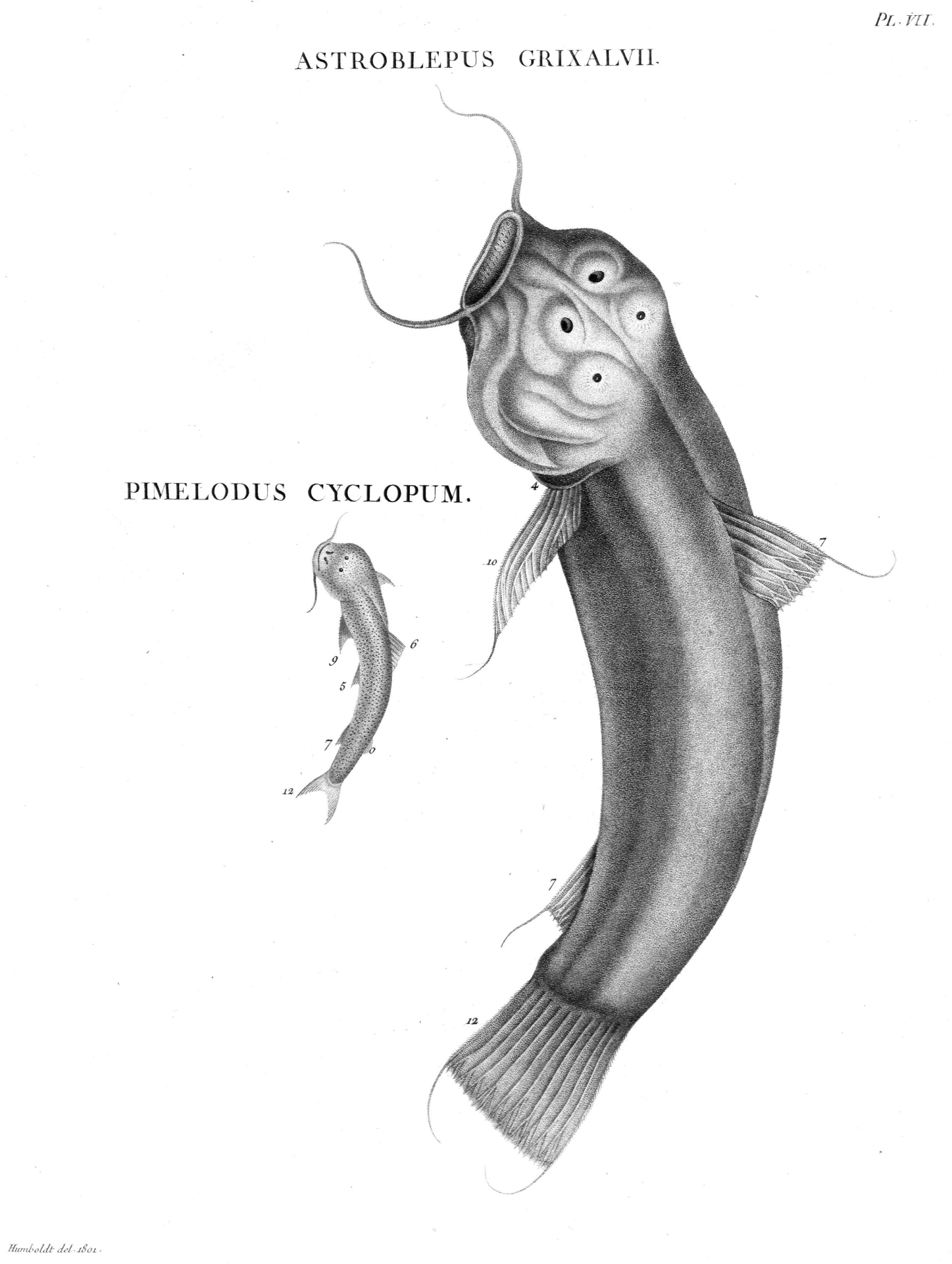

Conservation status
- Least Concern (IUCN 3.1)

Scientific classification
- Kingdom: Animalia
- Phylum: Chordata
- Class: Actinopterygii
- Order: Siluriformes
- Family: Astroblepidae
- Genus: Astroblepus
- Species: A. grixalvii

Binomial name
- Astroblepus grixalvii Humboldt, 1805

= Astroblepus grixalvii =

Species of fish

Astroblepus grixalvii is a species of freshwater ray-finned fish belonging to the family Astroblepidae, the climbing catfishes. This catfish is found in South America in Colombia and Ecuador.

Astroblepus grixalvii is found in the higher basin of the Magdalena-Cauca rivers in Colombia where it is common. In Ecuador it is found in the Esmeraldas and Guayas basin where it is uncommon. It can be found between 1,200 and 2,800 m in altitude.

The specific name memorializes of Don Mariano Grixalva, "a respectable scholar" who lived at Popayán.

== Bibliography ==
- Eschmeyer, William N., ed. 1998. Catalog of Fishes. Special Publication of the Center for Biodiversity Research and Information, num. 1, vol. 1–3. California Academy of Sciences. San Francisco, California, United States. 2905. ISBN 0-940228-47-5.
