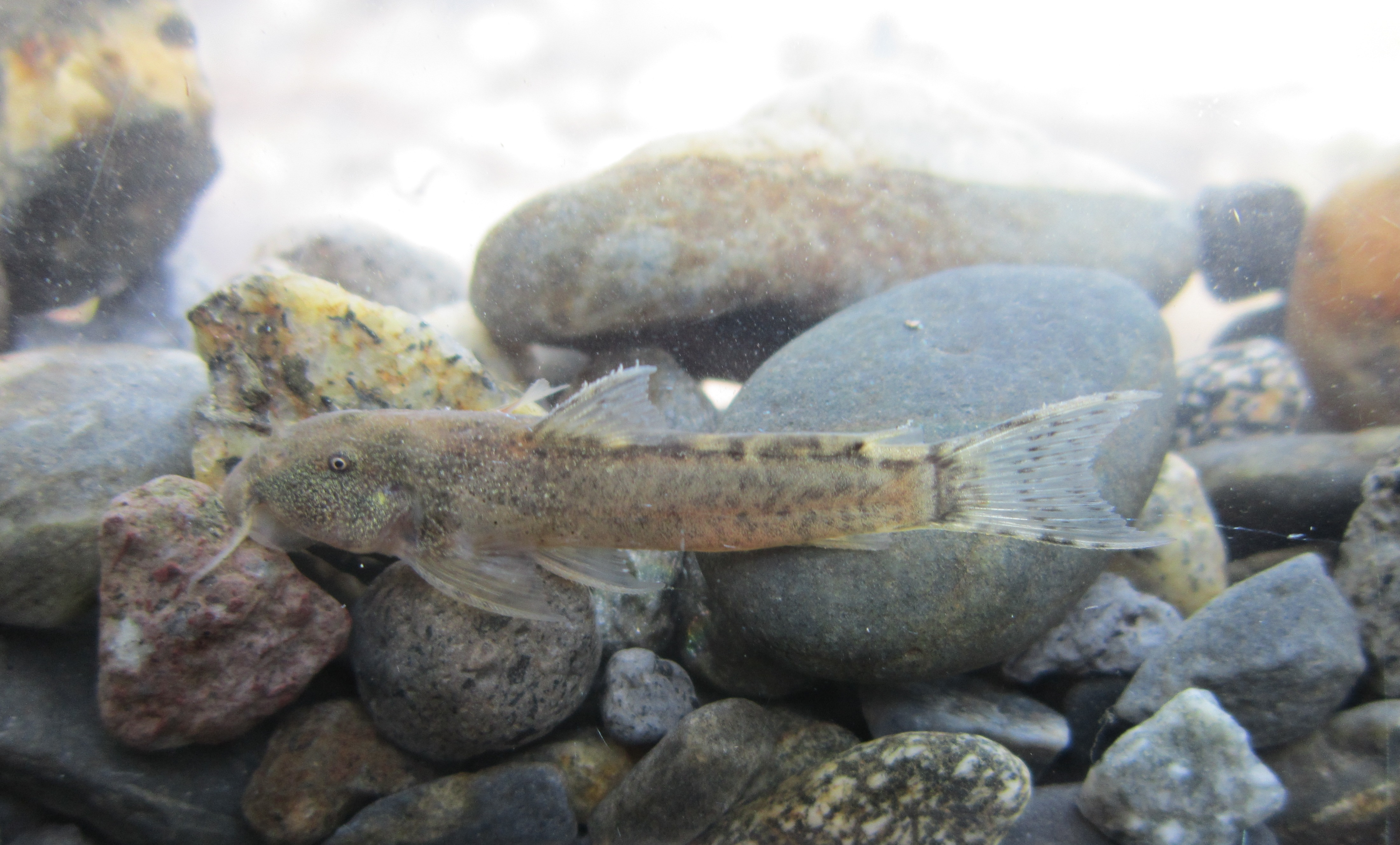

Conservation status
- Least Concern (IUCN 3.1)

Scientific classification
- Kingdom: Animalia
- Phylum: Chordata
- Class: Actinopterygii
- Order: Siluriformes
- Family: Astroblepidae
- Genus: Astroblepus
- Species: A. guentheri

Binomial name
- Astroblepus guentheri (Boulenger, 1887)

Synonyms
- Stygogenes guentheri Boulenger, 1887

= Astroblepus guentheri =

Species of fish

Astroblepus guentheri is a species of freshwater ray-finned fish belonging to the family Astroblepidae, the climbing catfishes. This catfish is found in South America in Colombia.

Astroblepus guentheri can be found in rainforest streams in the basin of the Magdalena-Cauca rivers and in some Pacific slope rivers in Colombia. It is an uncommon and not well studied species.

The person honoured by the eponym in the specific name, guenetherii, was not identified by the describer, George Albert Boulenger, but it clearly honours the ichthyologist and herpetologist Albert Günther of the British Museum (Natural History), where the type specimen is retained.

== Bibliography ==
- Eschmeyer, William N., ed. 1998. Catalog of Fishes. Special Publication of the Center for Biodiversity Research and Information, num. 1, vol. 1–3. California Academy of Sciences. San Francisco, California, United States. 2905. ISBN 0-940228-47-5.
