= Astroblepus whymperi =

Conservation status
- Data Deficient (IUCN 3.1)

Scientific classification
- Kingdom: Animalia
- Phylum: Chordata
- Class: Actinopterygii
- Order: Siluriformes
- Family: Astroblepidae
- Genus: Astroblepus
- Species: A. whymperi

Binomial name
- Astroblepus whymperi (Boulenger, 1890)

Synonyms
- Arges whymperi Boulenger, 1890

Species of fish

Astroblepus whymperi is a species of freshwater ray-finned fish belonging to the family Astroblepidae, the climbing catfishes. This catfish is found in South America where it occurs in the Esmeraldas River drainage of Ecuador. This species attains a maximum standard length of 9 cm (3.5 in).

The specific name, whymperi, honours the English mountaineer and explorer Edward Whymper, who collected specimens of fishes, amphibians and reptiles in the Andes of Ecuador, which he sent to the British Museum (Natural History), his collection included the holotype of this species.

== Bibliography ==
- Eschmeyer, William N., ed. 1998. Catalog of Fishes. Special Publication of the Center for Biodiversity Research and Information, num. 1, vol. 1–3. California Academy of Sciences. San Francisco, California, United States. 2905. ISBN 0-940228-47-5.
