= Astroblepus regani =

Conservation status
- Data Deficient (IUCN 3.1)

Scientific classification
- Kingdom: Animalia
- Phylum: Chordata
- Class: Actinopterygii
- Order: Siluriformes
- Family: Astroblepidae
- Genus: Astroblepus
- Species: A. regani

Binomial name
- Astroblepus regani (Pellegrin, 1909)

Synonyms
- Arges regani Pellegrin, 1909

Species of fish

Astroblepus regani is a species of freshwater ray-finned fish belonging to the family Astroblepidae, the climbing catfishes. This catfish is found in South America where it is endemic to northwestern Ecuador in the Santiago-Cayapas drainage system. This species attains a maximum standard length of 16 cm (6.3 in).

The specific name, regani, honors the ichthyologist Charles Tate Regan of the Natural History Museum (London), for his important 1904 monograph on loricariid catfishes.

== Bibliography ==
- Eschmeyer, William N., ed. 1998. Catalog of Fishes. Special Publication of the Center for Biodiversity Research and Information, num. 1, vol. 1–3. California Academy of Sciences. San Francisco, California, United States. 2905. ISBN 0-940228-47-5.
