= Astroblepus boulengeri =

Conservation status
- Data Deficient (IUCN 3.1)

Scientific classification
- Kingdom: Animalia
- Phylum: Chordata
- Class: Actinopterygii
- Order: Siluriformes
- Family: Astroblepidae
- Genus: Astroblepus
- Species: A. boulengeri

Binomial name
- Astroblepus boulengeri (Regan, 1904)

Synonyms
- Arges boulengeri Regan, 1904

Species of fish

Astroblepus boulengeri is a species of freshwater ray-finned fish belonging to the family Astroblepidae, the climbing catfishes. This catfish is endemic to Ecuador where it is found in the Napo-Pastaza river system. This species attains a maximum standard length of 7 cm (2.8 in).

== Bibliography ==
- Eschmeyer, William N., ed. 1998. Catalog of Fishes. Special Publication of the Center for Biodiversity Research and Information, núm. 1, vol. 1–3. California Academy of Sciences. San Francisco, California, United States. 2905. ISBN 0-940228-47-5.
