= Astroblepus fissidens =

Conservation status
- Near Threatened (IUCN 3.1)

Scientific classification
- Kingdom: Animalia
- Phylum: Chordata
- Class: Actinopterygii
- Order: Siluriformes
- Family: Astroblepidae
- Genus: Astroblepus
- Species: A. fissidens

Binomial name
- Astroblepus fissidens (Regan, 1904)

Synonyms
- Arges fissidens Regan, 1904

Species of fish

Astroblepus fissidens is a species of freshwater ray-finned fish belonging to the family Astroblepidae, the climbing catfishes. This catfish occurs on stony stream bottoms or on muddy streambeds with pebbles. It is also found in streams which have variable flows where the banks are moderately to steeply sloped or undercut. It prefers depths of between 0.1-0.9 m, and it feeds on small arthropods and detritus. It has been recorded from the Mataje and Santiago river basins in northwestern Ecuador between altitudes of 1000m to 2700m. There is little information about its population, but it may have been affected by habitat modification and pollution due to increasing urbanisation around the rivers it occurs in.

== Bibliography ==
- Eschmeyer, William N., ed. 1998. Catalog of Fishes. Special Publication of the Center for Biodiversity Research and Information, num. 1, vol. 1–3. California Academy of Sciences. San Francisco, California, United States. 2905. ISBN 0-940228-47-5.
