= Astroblepus vaillanti =

Conservation status
- Data Deficient (IUCN 3.1)

Scientific classification
- Kingdom: Animalia
- Phylum: Chordata
- Class: Actinopterygii
- Order: Siluriformes
- Family: Astroblepidae
- Genus: Astroblepus
- Species: A. vaillanti

Binomial name
- Astroblepus vaillanti (Regan, 1904)

Synonyms
- Arges vaillanti Regan, 1904

Species of fish

Astroblepus vaillanti is a species of freshwater ray-finned fish belonging to the family Astroblepidae, the climbing catfishes. This catfish is found in South America where it occurs in the Pacific coastal drainages of Ecuador. This species attains a maximum standard length of 10 cm (3.9 in).

The specific name, vaillanti, honors the French zoologist Léon Vaillant of the Muséum National d'Histoire Naturelle, Paris, “through whose kindness [Regan] was permitted to examine the specimens in the Jardin des Plantes”.

== Bibliography ==
- Eschmeyer, William N., ed. 1998. Catalog of Fishes. Special Publication of the Center for Biodiversity Research and Information, num. 1, vol. 1–3. California Academy of Sciences. San Francisco, California, United States. 2905. ISBN 0-940228-47-5.
