= Astroblepus festae =

Conservation status
- Least Concern (IUCN 3.1)

Scientific classification
- Kingdom: Animalia
- Phylum: Chordata
- Class: Actinopterygii
- Order: Siluriformes
- Family: Astroblepidae
- Genus: Astroblepus
- Species: A. festae

Binomial name
- Astroblepus festae (Boulenger, 1898)

Synonyms
- Arges festae Boulenger, 1898

Species of fish

Astroblepus festae is a species of freshwater ray-finned fish belonging to the family Astroblepidae, the climbing catfishes. This catfish is found in the upper basins of the Río Marañon and Rio Napo in Ecuador, and in tributaries of the Magdalena-Cauca river drainages in Colombia.

The specific name honours the Italian naturalist Enrico Festa, who collected the type specimen.

== Bibliography ==
- Eschmeyer, William N., ed. 1998. Catalog of Fishes. Special Publication of the Center for Biodiversity Research and Information, num. 1, vol. 1–3. California Academy of Sciences. San Francisco, California, United States. 2905. ISBN 0-940228-47-5.
