= Astroblepus orientalis =

Scientific classification
- Kingdom: Animalia
- Phylum: Chordata
- Class: Actinopterygii
- Order: Siluriformes
- Family: Astroblepidae
- Genus: Astroblepus
- Species: A. orientalis

Binomial name
- Astroblepus orientalis (Boulenger, 1903)

Synonyms
- Arges orientalis Boulenger, 1903

Species of fish

Astroblepus orientalis, the Albarregas catfish or Albarregas naked sucker-mouth catfish, is a species of freshwater ray-finned fish belonging to the family Astroblepidae, the climbing catfishes. This catfish is found in South America where it is endemic to Venezuela in the drainage basin of Lake Maracaibo.

== Bibliography ==
- Eschmeyer, William N., ed. 1998. Catalog of Fishes. Special Publication of the Center for Biodiversity Research and Information, num. 1, vol. 1–3. California Academy of Sciences. San Francisco, California, United States. 2905. ISBN 0-940228-47-5.
