= Astroblepus longifilis =

Conservation status
- Least Concern (IUCN 3.1)

Scientific classification
- Kingdom: Animalia
- Phylum: Chordata
- Class: Actinopterygii
- Order: Siluriformes
- Family: Astroblepidae
- Genus: Astroblepus
- Species: A. longifilis

Binomial name
- Astroblepus longifilis (Steindachner, 1882)

Synonyms
- Arges longifilis Steindachner, 1882

Species of fish

Astroblepus longifilis is a species of freshwater ray-finned fish belonging to the family Astroblepidae, the climbing catfishes. This catfish is found in South America, in Colombia, Ecuador and Peru. In Colombia it occurs in the Magdalena-Cauca river basin and in Pacific slope rivers; in Ecuador it is found in the basin of the Esmeraldas-Guayas rivers; in Peru it is found in the Marañón and Huánuco river basins. This species attains a maximum standard length of 7 cm (2.8 in).

== Bibliography ==
- Eschmeyer, William N., ed. 1998. Catalog of Fishes. Special Publication of the Center for Biodiversity Research and Information, num. 1, vol. 1–3. California Academy of Sciences. San Francisco, California, United States. 2905. ISBN 0-940228-47-5.
