= Astroblepus prenadillus =

Conservation status
- Near Threatened (IUCN 3.1)

Scientific classification
- Kingdom: Animalia
- Phylum: Chordata
- Class: Actinopterygii
- Order: Siluriformes
- Family: Astroblepidae
- Genus: Astroblepus
- Species: A. prenadillus

Binomial name
- Astroblepus prenadillus (Valenciennes, 1840)

Synonyms
- Brontes prenadilla Valenciennes, 1840

Species of fish

Astroblepus prenadillus is a species of freshwater ray-finned fish belonging to the family Astroblepidae, the climbing catfishes. This catfish is found in South America where it occurs in the Andes of Ecuador. A. prenadillus attains a maximum standard length of 20 cm (7.9 in).

== Bibliography ==
- Eschmeyer, William N., ed. 1998. Catalog of Fishes. Special Publication of the Center for Biodiversity Research and Information, num. 1, vol. 1–3. California Academy of Sciences. San Francisco, California, United States. 2905. ISBN 0-940228-47-5.
