= Astroblepus mindoensis =

Conservation status
- Near Threatened (IUCN 3.1)

Scientific classification
- Kingdom: Animalia
- Phylum: Chordata
- Class: Actinopterygii
- Order: Siluriformes
- Family: Astroblepidae
- Genus: Astroblepus
- Species: A. mindoensis

Binomial name
- Astroblepus mindoensis (Regan, 1916)

Synonyms
- Cyclopium mindoense Regan 1916; Astroblepus mindoense (Regan 1916)

Species of fish

Astroblepus mindoensis is a species of freshwater ray-finned fish belonging to the family Astroblepidae, the climbing catfishes. This catfish is found in South America where it is endemic to the Esmeraldas River drainage in western Ecuador. This species attains a maximum standard length of 7.9 cm (3.1 in).
