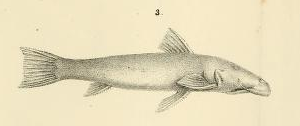

Conservation status
- Data Deficient (IUCN 3.1).

Scientific classification
- Kingdom: Animalia
- Phylum: Chordata
- Class: Actinopterygii
- Order: Siluriformes
- Family: Astroblepidae
- Genus: Astroblepus
- Species: A. peruanus

Binomial name
- Astroblepus peruanus (Steindachner, 1875)

Synonyms
- Arges peruanus (Steindachner, 1875)

= Astroblepus peruanus =

Species of fish

Astroblepus peruanus is a species of catfish of the family Astroblepidae. It was first described by Franz Steindachner in 1875. It is described by Scott Allen Schaefer as being around 6 cm long. It is stated to be found in Amable Maria, Loja.

== Bibliography ==
- Eschmeyer, William N., ed. 1998. Catalog of Fishes. Special Publication of the Center for Biodiversity Research and Information, num. 1, vol. 1–3. California Academy of Sciences. San Francisco, California, United States. 2905. ISBN 0-940228-47-5.
- Steindachner, F. (1877). Arges Peruanus. In Ichthyologische Beiträge (Vol. IV, pp. 601–603). essay, Sitzungsberichte der Kaiserlichen Akademie der Wissenschaften. Mathematisch-Naturwissenschaftliche Classe. Abt. 1, Mineralogie, Botanik, Zoologie, Geologie und Paläontologie.
- Kullander, S. O., Ferraris, C. J., & Schaefer, S. A. (2003). Family Astroblepidae. In Check list of the freshwater fishes of south and Central America (pp. 312–314). essay, EDIPUCRS.
