= Astroblepus theresiae =

Conservation status
- Near Threatened (IUCN 3.1)

Scientific classification
- Kingdom: Animalia
- Phylum: Chordata
- Class: Actinopterygii
- Order: Siluriformes
- Family: Astroblepidae
- Genus: Astroblepus
- Species: A. theresiae

Binomial name
- Astroblepus theresiae (Steindachner, 1907)

Synonyms
- Arges theresiae Steindachner, 1907

Species of fish

Astroblepus theresiae is a species of freshwater ray-finned fish belonging to the family Astroblepidae, the climbing catfishes. This catfish is endemic to Ecuador, where it is found in coastal river systems draing into the Pacific. This species attains a maximum standard length of 8 cm (3.1 in).

The specific name honors Princess Therese of Bavaria, an amateur naturalist and explorer, who conducted scientific expeditions to South America, and encouraged knowledge about Bolivia. Ecuador and Peru.

== Bibliography ==
- Eschmeyer, William N., ed. 1998. Catalog of Fishes. Special Publication of the Center for Biodiversity Research and Information, num. 1, vol. 1–3. California Academy of Sciences. San Francisco, California, United States. 2905. ISBN 0-940228-47-5.
