= Astroblepus marmoratus =

Conservation status
- Data Deficient (IUCN 3.1)

Scientific classification
- Kingdom: Animalia
- Phylum: Chordata
- Class: Actinopterygii
- Order: Siluriformes
- Family: Astroblepidae
- Genus: Astroblepus
- Species: A. marmoratus

Binomial name
- Astroblepus marmoratus (Regan, 1904)

Synonyms
- Arges marmoratus Regan, 1904

Species of fish

Astroblepus marmoratus is a species of freshwater ray-finned fish belonging to the family Astroblepidae, the climbing catfishes. This catfish is found in South America where it occurs in highly oxygenated rainforest streams and is endemic to the Magdalena River basin in Colombia. This species attains a maximum standard length of 7.0 cm (2.8 in).

== Bibliography ==
- Eschmeyer, William N., ed. 1998. Catalog of Fishes. Special Publication of the Center for Biodiversity Research and Information, num. 1, vol. 1–3. California Academy of Sciences. San Francisco, California, United States. 2905. ISBN 0-940228-47-5.
