= Andean catfish =

Conservation status
- Critically Endangered (IUCN 3.1)

Scientific classification
- Kingdom: Animalia
- Phylum: Chordata
- Class: Actinopterygii
- Order: Siluriformes
- Family: Astroblepidae
- Genus: Astroblepus
- Species: A. ubidiai

Binomial name
- Astroblepus ubidiai (Pellegrin, 1931)

Synonyms
- Cyclopium ubidiai Pellegrin, 1931

Species of fish

The Andean catfish (Astroblepus ubidiai) is a species of freshwater ray-finned fish belonging to the family Astroblepidae, the climbing catfishes. This catfish is endemic to the highlands of the Ecuadorian Andes where it lives in mountain streams in four different drainage basins in the Imbakucha watershed. It is a brownish-grey fish growing to about 150 mm (6 in). The fish is threatened by human activities in the area with loss and fragmentation of its habitat, and the International Union for Conservation of Nature has assessed its conservation status as being "critically endangered".

== Description ==
The Andean catfish's natural habitats are the mountainous rivers, freshwater springs or aquifers, caves and inland karsts of four different drainage basins within the Imbakucha watershed. It is brownish gray in colour and has no scales; large adults can grow up to 150 mm. Like all other catfishes, it has barbels around the mouth which contain taste buds that help the animal find food at night. Its diet consists of other fish, frogs, snails, algae, and other aquatic organisms.

== Status ==
The species is critically endangered by habitat loss, pollution, and fishing. Habitat loss has fragmented its population; natural and anthropogenic barriers, such as pasture grounds, fields, human settlements, and the presence of predators such as piscivorous large mouth bass in Imbakucha Lake have resulted in the segregation of its six subpopulations and limit their probabilities of escape to other refugia when the environment deteriorates.

== Sources ==
- Velez-Espino, L.A. (2004). "Threatened fishes of the world: Astroblepus ubidiai (Pellegrin, 1931) (Astroblepidae)". Environmental Biology of Fishes. 71 (3). Kluwer Academic Publishers: 296. doi:10.1007/s10641-004-1034-6. ISSN 0378-1909. S2CID 36552486.
- Arguello, P.; Jimenez-Prado, P. (2016). "Astroblepus ubidiai". IUCN Red List of Threatened Species. 2016 e.T46862A66234973. doi:10.2305/IUCN.UK.2016-1.RLTS.T46862A66234973.en.
