= Astroblepus pirrensis =

Conservation status
- Least Concern (IUCN 3.1)

Scientific classification
- Kingdom: Animalia
- Phylum: Chordata
- Class: Actinopterygii
- Order: Siluriformes
- Family: Astroblepidae
- Genus: Astroblepus
- Species: A. pirrensis

Binomial name
- Astroblepus pirrensis (Meek & Hildebrand, 1913)

Synonyms
- Cyclopium pirrense Meek & Hildebrand, 1913

Species of fish

Astroblepus pirrensis is a species of freshwater ray-finned fish belonging to the family Astroblepidae, the climbing catfishes. This catfish is found in Central America where it occurs in high altitude streams in both the Atlantic and Pacific drainages of Panama. A. pirrense attains a maximum standard length of 13.0 cm (5.1 in).

== Bibliography ==
- Eschmeyer, William N., ed. 1998. Catalog of Fishes. Special Publication of the Center for Biodiversity Research and Information, num. 1, vol. 1–3. California Academy of Sciences. San Francisco, California, United States. 2905. ISBN 0-940228-47-5.
