= Astroblepus taczanowskii =

Conservation status
- Data Deficient (IUCN 3.1)

Scientific classification
- Kingdom: Animalia
- Phylum: Chordata
- Class: Actinopterygii
- Order: Siluriformes
- Family: Astroblepidae
- Genus: Astroblepus
- Species: A. taczanowskii

Binomial name
- Astroblepus taczanowskii (Boulenger, 1890)

Synonyms
- Arges taczanowskii Boulenger, 1890

Species of fish

Astroblepus taczanowskii is a species of freshwater ray-finned fish belonging to the family Astroblepidae, the climbing catfishes. This catfish is found in South America where it occurs in the Amazon basin of Peru. This species attains a maximum standard length of 8 cm (3.1 in).

The specific name, taczanowskii, honors the Polish zoologist Władysław (or Ladislas) Taczanowski, who provided the holotype of this species as part of an exchange of specimens between the British Museum (Natural History) and the Warsaw University Museum.

== Bibliography ==
- Eschmeyer, William N., ed. 1998. Catalog of Fishes. Special Publication of the Center for Biodiversity Research and Information, num. 1, vol. 1–3. California Academy of Sciences. San Francisco, California, United States. 2905. ISBN 0-940228-47-5.
