= Rhodosciadium =

Scientific classification
- Kingdom: Plantae
- Clade: Tracheophytes
- Clade: Angiosperms
- Clade: Eudicots
- Clade: Asterids
- Order: Apiales
- Family: Apiaceae
- Subfamily: Apioideae
- Tribe: Selineae
- Genus: Rhodosciadium; S.Watson

Synonyms
- Deanea J.M.Coult. & Rose

Genus of flowering plant

Rhodosciadium is a genus of flowering plants belonging to the family Apiaceae.

It is native to Mexico and Guatemala.

The genus name of Rhodosciadium is in honour of Joseph Nelson Rose (1862–1928), an American botanist. Note the Greek for 'Rose' is (rhódon). It is used for red-colored or rose-like. It was first described and published in Proc. Amer. Acad. Arts Vol.25 on page 151 in 1890.

== Known species ==
According to Kew:

- Rhodosciadium argutum (Rose) Mathias & Constance
- Rhodosciadium diffusum (J.M.Coult. & Rose) Mathias & Constance
- Rhodosciadium dissectum J.M.Coult. & Rose
- Rhodosciadium glaucum J.M.Coult. & Rose
- Rhodosciadium longipes (Rose) Mathias & Constance
- Rhodosciadium macrophyllum Mathias & Constance
- Rhodosciadium macvaughiae Mathias & Constance
- Rhodosciadium montanum (J.M.Coult. & Rose) Mathias & Constance
- Rhodosciadium nelsonii (J.M.Coult. & Rose) Mathias & Constance
- Rhodosciadium nudicaule (J.M.Coult. & Rose) Drude
- Rhodosciadium pringlei S.Watson
- Rhodosciadium purpureum (Rose) Mathias & Constance
- Rhodosciadium rzedowskii Mathias & Constance
- Rhodosciadium tolucense (Kunth) Mathias
- Rhodosciadium tuberosum (J.M.Coult. & Rose) Drude
