= Astroblepus phelpsi =

Scientific classification
- Kingdom: Animalia
- Phylum: Chordata
- Class: Actinopterygii
- Order: Siluriformes
- Family: Astroblepidae
- Genus: Astroblepus
- Species: A. phelpsi

Binomial name
- Astroblepus phelpsi L. P. Schultz, 1944

Species of fish

Astroblepus phelpsi, the Phelp's catfish, Phelp's naked sucker-mouth catfish or Andean naked sucker-mouth catfish, is a species of freshwater ray-finned fish belonging to the family Astroblepidae, the climbing catfishes. This catfish is found in South America where it is endemic to the Lake Maracaibo drainage in Venezuela. This species attains a maximum standard length of 7 cm (2.8 in).

The specific name is assumed to honor the businessman and ornithologist William H. Phelps Jr., of Caracas, a “well-known leader in furthering the development of the biological sciences in Venezuela”, and whom Schultz named Spatuloricaria phelpsi in honor of in the same publication as the description of this species. However, it could also apply to his father William H. Phelps, Sr., who was also a businessman and ornithologist in Venezuela.

== Bibliography ==
- Eschmeyer, William N., ed. 1998. Catalog of Fishes. Special Publication of the Center for Biodiversity Research and Information, num. 1, vol. 1–3. California Academy of Sciences. San Francisco, California, United States. 2905. ISBN 0-940228-47-5.
