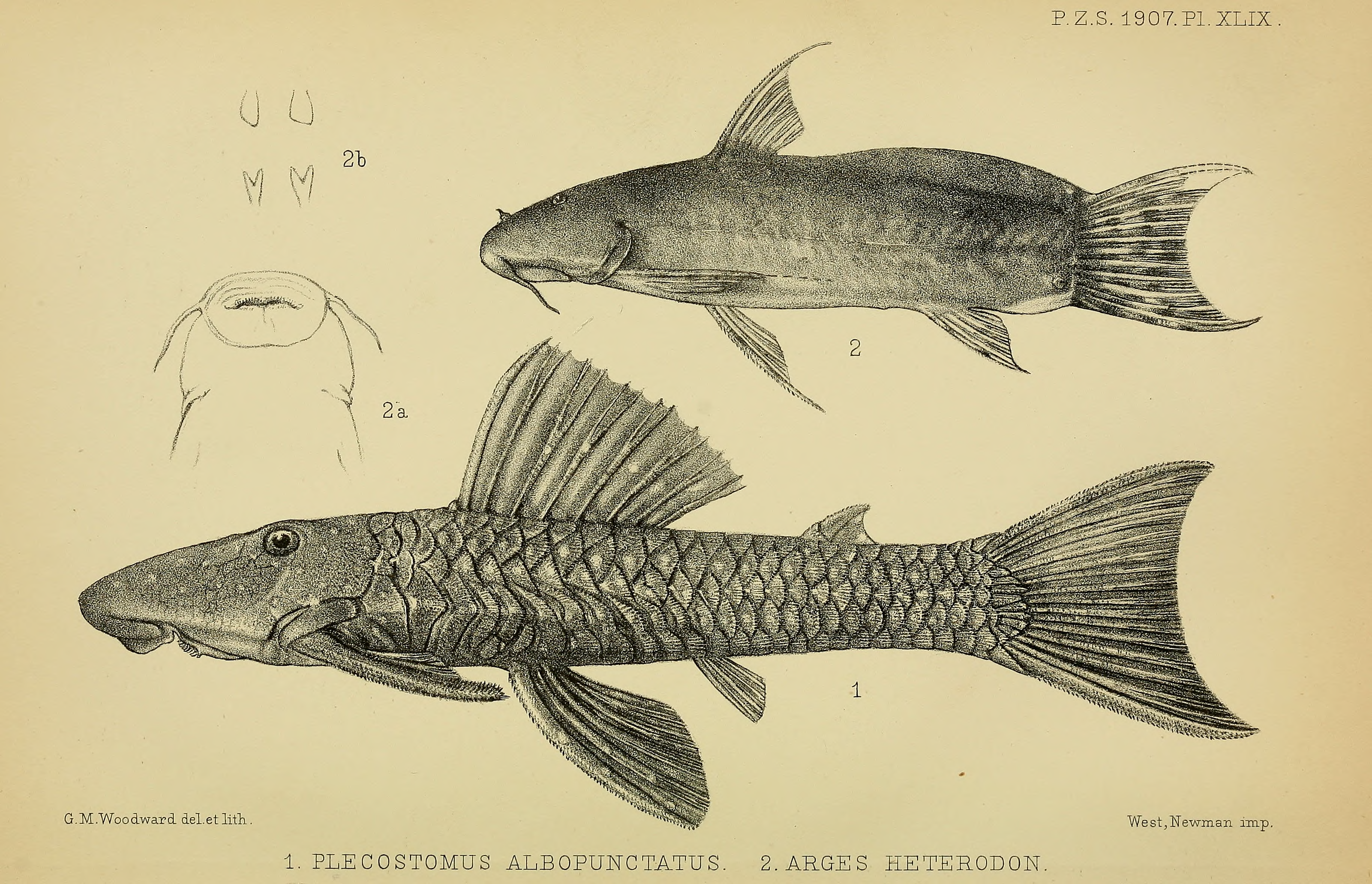
- Astroblepus heterodon top

Conservation status
- Vulnerable (IUCN 3.1)

Scientific classification
- Kingdom: Animalia
- Phylum: Chordata
- Class: Actinopterygii
- Order: Siluriformes
- Family: Astroblepidae
- Genus: Astroblepus
- Species: A. heterodon

Binomial name
- Astroblepus heterodon (Regan, 1908)

Synonyms
- Arges heterodon Regan, 1908

= Astroblepus heterodon =

Species of fish

Astroblepus heterodon is a species of freshwater ray-finned fish belonging to the family Astroblepidae, the climbing catfishes. This catfish is found in South America, in the rivers which drain the Pacific slope of Colombia. Its population is vulnerable to pollution from gold mining. This species has a maximum standard length of 12 cm (4.7 in).

== Bibliography ==
- Eschmeyer, William N., ed. 1998. Catalog of Fishes. Special Publication of the Center for Biodiversity Research and Information, num. 1, vol. 1–3. California Academy of Sciences. San Francisco, California, United States. 2905. ISBN 0-940228-47-5.
