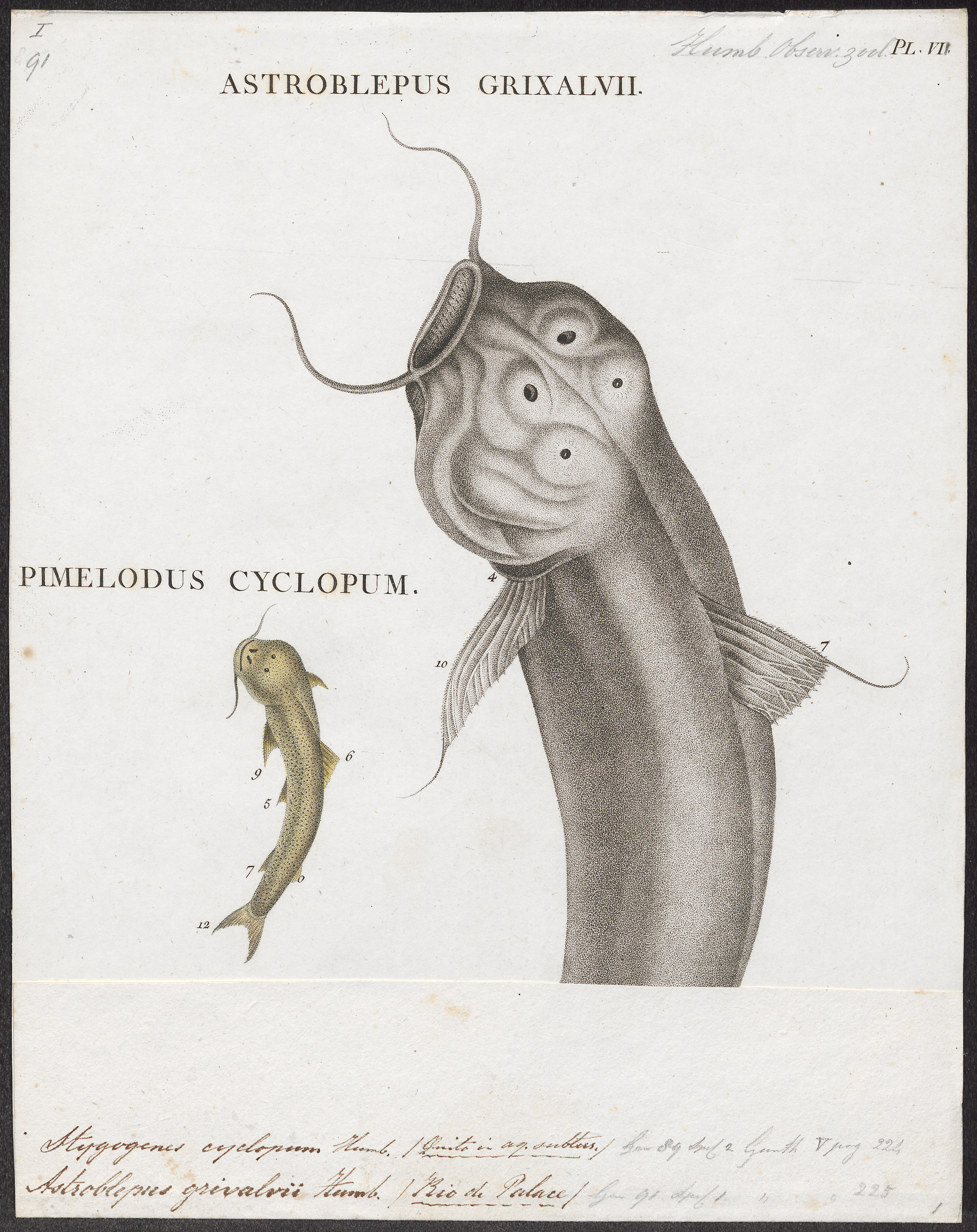

Conservation status
- Least Concern (IUCN 3.1)

Scientific classification
- Kingdom: Animalia
- Phylum: Chordata
- Class: Actinopterygii
- Order: Siluriformes
- Family: Astroblepidae
- Genus: Astroblepus
- Species: A. cyclopus

Binomial name
- Astroblepus cyclopus (Humboldt, 1805)

Synonyms
- Pimelodus cyclopum Humboldt, 1805; Cyclopium humboldtii Swainson, 1839; Stygogenes humboldtii Günther, 1864

= Astroblepus cyclopus =

Species of fish

Astroblepus cyclopus is a species of freshwater ray-finned fish belonging to the family Astroblepidae, the climbing catfishes. This catfish is found in the Mira and Esmeraldas River drainage system, and other Pacific coastal drainage systems, in Ecuador and in the Magdalena River Basin of Colombia. This species attains a maximum standard length of 4.9 cm (1.9 in).

== Bibliography ==
- Eschmeyer, William N., ed. 1998. Catalog of Fishes. Special Publication of the Center for Biodiversity Research and Information, num. 1, vol. 1–3. California Academy of Sciences. San Francisco, California, United States. 2905. ISBN 0-940228-47-5.
