= Astroblepus formosus =

Conservation status
- Critically Endangered (IUCN 3.1).

Scientific classification
- Kingdom: Animalia
- Phylum: Chordata
- Class: Actinopterygii
- Order: Siluriformes
- Family: Astroblepidae
- Genus: Astroblepus
- Species: A. formosus

Binomial name
- Astroblepus formosus Fowler, 1945

Species of fish

Astroblepus formosus is a species of freshwater ray-finned fish belonging to the family Astroblepidae, the climbing catfishes. This species inhabits high-altitude streams of the Ucayali River basin in Peru, often at elevations exceeding 2,500 m (8,200 ft).

== Bibliography ==
- Eschmeyer, William N., ed. 1998. Catalog of Fishes. Special Publication of the Center for Biodiversity Research and Information, num. 1, vol. 1–3. California Academy of Sciences. San Francisco, California, United States. 2905. ISBN 0-940228-47-5.
