= Astroblepus stuebeli =

Conservation status
- Data Deficient (IUCN 3.1)

Scientific classification
- Kingdom: Animalia
- Phylum: Chordata
- Class: Actinopterygii
- Order: Siluriformes
- Family: Astroblepidae
- Genus: Astroblepus
- Species: A. stuebeli

Binomial name
- Astroblepus stuebeli (Wandolleck, 1916)

Synonyms
- Arges stuebeli Wandolleck, 1916

Species of fish

Astroblepus stuebeli is a species of freshwater ray-finned fish belonging to the family Astroblepidae, the climbing catfishes. This catfish is found in Lake Titicaca in Peru. This species attains a maximum standard length of 8 cm (3.1 in).

The specific name honors German geologist and vulcanologist Moritz Alphons Stübel who collected the holotype.

== Bibliography ==
- Eschmeyer, William N., ed. 1998. Catalog of Fishes. Special Publication of the Center for Biodiversity Research and Information, num. 1, vol. 1–3. California Academy of Sciences. San Francisco, California, United States. 2905. ISBN 0-940228-47-5.
