= Astroblepus mariae =

Conservation status
- Endangered (IUCN 3.1)

Scientific classification
- Kingdom: Animalia
- Phylum: Chordata
- Class: Actinopterygii
- Order: Siluriformes
- Family: Astroblepidae
- Genus: Astroblepus
- Species: A. mariae

Binomial name
- Astroblepus mariae (Fowler, 1919)

Synonyms
- Cyclopium mariae Fowler, 1919

Species of fish

Astroblepus mariae is a species of freshwater ray-finned fish belonging to the family Astroblepidae, the climbing catfishes. This catfish is found in South America, where it occurs in the Orinoco basin and in Pacific draining basins in streams and rivers at elevations between 980 and 2,200 m (3,220 and 7,220 ft).

The specific name honors Hermano Apolinar Maria, director of the Museum at the Instituto de La Salle, Bogotá, who collected the holotype and offered Fowler the opportunity to study it.

== Bibliography ==
- Eschmeyer, William N., ed. 1998. Catalog of Fishes. Special Publication of the Center for Biodiversity Research and Information, num. 1, vol. 1–3. California Academy of Sciences. San Francisco, California, United States. 2905. ISBN 0-940228-47-5.
