= Astroblepus rengifoi =

Conservation status
- Data Deficient (IUCN 3.1)

Scientific classification
- Kingdom: Animalia
- Phylum: Chordata
- Class: Actinopterygii
- Order: Siluriformes
- Family: Astroblepidae
- Genus: Astroblepus
- Species: A. rengifoi

Binomial name
- Astroblepus rengifoi Dahl, 1960

Species of fish

Astroblepus rengifoi is a species of freshwater ray-finned fish belonging to the family Astroblepidae, the climbing catfishes. This catfish is found in South America where it is known only from its type locality, a small stream that is a tributary to the Atrato River, around 6 km (3.7 mi) upstream from the town of El Carmen de Atrato, in the Chocó region of western Colombia. This species attains a maximum standard length of 5 cm (2.0 in).

The specific name, rengifoi, honors the entomologist Santiago Rengifo Salcedo, for his "ceaseless work for the advancement of biological science in Colombia".

== Bibliography ==
- Eschmeyer, William N., ed. 1998. Catalog of Fishes. Special Publication of the Center for Biodiversity Research and Information, num. 1, vol. 1–3. California Academy of Sciences. San Francisco, California, United States. 2905. ISBN 0-940228-47-5.
