= Dagua River =

River in Colombia

Río Dagua
- Location of mouth

Location
- Location: Colombia

Physical characteristics
- Source
  - location: Farallones de Cali
- Mouth
  - location: Pacific Ocean
  - coordinates: 3°51′41″N 77°03′55″W
- Length: 101 km (63 mi)

The Dagua River (Río Dagua) is a river in Valle del Cauca, Colombia. It generally flows north by northwest from the Farallones de Cali into the Pacific Ocean next to Buenaventura. In recent years illegal mining has caused ecological damage to the river. The middle portion of the river runs through the Dagua Canyon Dry Enclave (Enclave Seco del Río Dagua) natural area which is listed as an Important Bird Area. Its a 62.8 mile (101.0668 km) river.

== See also ==
- List of rivers of Colombia
- Pacific Region, Colombia
- Dagua
