= Nathan Everett Pearson =

American ichthyologist (1895–1982)

Nathan Everett Pearson (1895–1982) was an American ichthyologist. He was a student of Carl H. Eigenmann at Indiana University. He traveled on the Mulford Expedition to the Amazon. He collected 6,000 specimens and discovered 25 new species.

== Books ==
- The fishes of the eastern slope of the Andes 1924 (83 pp.)
- The fishes of the Beni-Mamoré and Paraguay basins 1937
- The fishes of the Atlantic and Pacific slopes near Cajamarca, Peru 1937
