= Carl H. Eigenmann =

German-American ichthyologist (1863–1927)

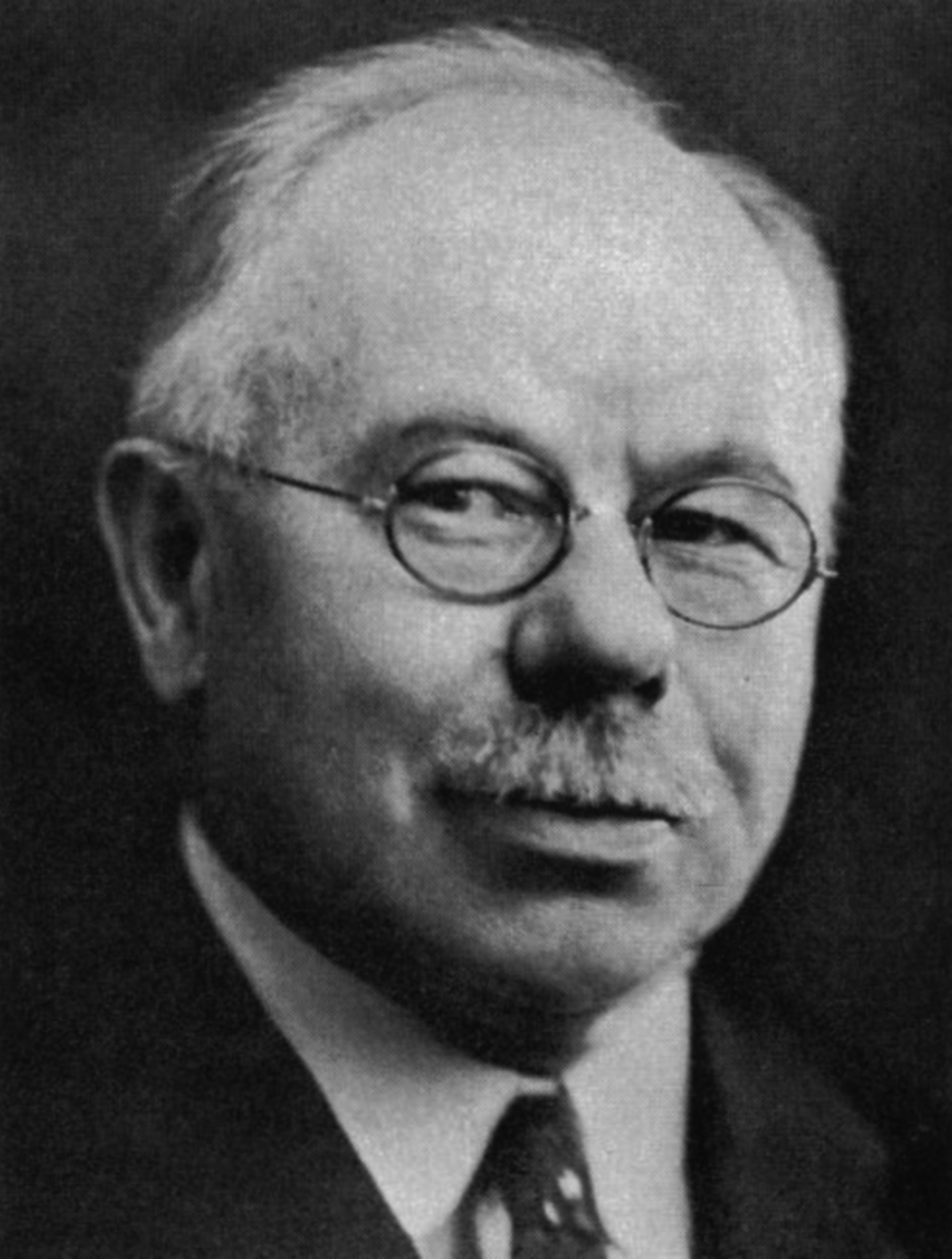
- Born: March 9, 1863; Flehingen, Grand Duchy of Baden
- Died: April 24, 1927 (aged 64); United States
- Education: Indiana University Bloomington
- Spouse: Rosa Smith Eigenmann
- Scientific career
- Fields: Ichthyology
- Workplaces: San Diego Biological Laboratory; Indiana University Bloomington; Carnegie Museum of Natural History
- Doctoral students: Effa Muhse
- Other notable students: Nathan Everett Pearson; Marion Durbin Ellis; John Diederich Haseman

Carl Henry Eigenmann (March 9, 1863 – April 24, 1927) was a German-American ichthyologist of the late nineteenth and early twentieth centuries who, along with his wife Rosa Smith Eigenmann and his zoology students, is credited with identifying and describing for the first time 195 genera containing nearly 600 species of fishes of North America and South America. Especially notable among his published papers are his studies of the freshwater fishes of South America, the evolution and systematics of South American fishes, and for his analysis of degenerative evolution based on his studies of blind cave fishes found in parts of North America and in Cuba. His most notable works are The American Characidae (1917–1929) and A revision of the South American Nematognathi or cat-fishes (1890), in addition to numerous published papers such as "Cave Vertebrates of North America, a study of degenerative evolution" (1909) and "The fresh-water fishes of Patagonia and an examination of the Archiplata-Archelenis theory" (1909).

Eigenmann was an alumnus of Indiana University, an instructor/professor in IU's department of zoology, and an administrator at IU's Bloomington, Indiana, campus for more than forty years. He was also the first dean of the IU graduate school from 1908 to 1927. In addition to his duties at IU, Eigenman was honorary curator of fishes at the Carnegie Museum in Pittsburgh, Pennsylvania, from 1909 to 1918. Eigenmann was elected to the National Academy of Sciences in 1923. He was also a fellow of the American Association for the Advancement of Science, a member and past president of the Indiana Academy of Science, an honorary member of the California Academy of Sciences and of the Sociedad de Ciencias Naturales of Bogotá, Colombia, as well as a member of other scientific organizations, including Sigma XI, a science honorary, and Phi Beta Kappa.

== Early life and education ==
Carl Henry Eigenmann was born on March 9, 1863, in Flehingen, Grand Duchy of Baden, to Philip and Margaretha (Lieb) Eigenmann. In 1877, at the age of fourteen, he emigrated to the United States with an uncle and settled in Rockport, Indiana.

In 1879, at the age of sixteen, Eigenmann enrolled at Indiana University in Bloomington, Indiana, intending to study law, Latin, and Greek. He became a member of Sigma Chi fraternity and then became interested in zoology after taking a biology course under David Starr Jordan. He then decided to pursue a career as an ichthyologist.

Eigenmann earned a bachelor's degree from IU in 1886, a master's degree in 1887, and a Ph.D. from IU in 1889. He also studied South American fish collections at Harvard University for a year in 1887–1888, before beginning his career as a researcher and educator in California.

While Eigenmann was still at student at IU, his first published paper, "Notes on skeletons of Etheostomatinae", co-authored with Jordan, was published in the Proceedings of the National Museum in 1885. "A review of the genera and species of Diodontidae found in American waters", the first of many papers that Eigenmann authored on his own, was published in the Annals of the New York Academy of Science in 1886, when he was twenty-three years old.

== Marriage and family ==
Through his IU professor, David Starr Jordan, Eigenmann met Rosa Smith, a former IU student from San Diego, California, who was already becoming known for her work on West Coast fishes. Eigenmann corresponded with Smith while she was living in San Diego, and traveled to California, where the couple married at Smith's home on August 20, 1887. Rosa Smith Eigenmann, also an ichthyologist, collaborated with her husband on several research projects after their marriage, but discontinued her own research pursuits in 1893, due to family responsibilities; however, she continued to edit her husband's research papers.

The Eigenmanns had five children. Lucretia Margaretha Eigenmann (1889–1965), the eldest, was mentally disabled; their son, Theodore Smith Eigenmann (1893–1970), was eventually institutionalized after serving in the army in 1918. The three other Eigenmann children pursued professional careers. Charlotte Elizabeth Eigenmann (1891–1959) graduated from Stanford University and pursued an editorial career. Adele Rosa (Eigenmann) Eiler (1896–1978) accompanied her father on the Irwin Expedition to South America in 1918–19 and received a medical degree from Indiana University in 1921. Adele later married John Oliver Eiler, and they moved to San Diego. Their young child, Thora Marie Eigenmann (1901–1968), a graduate of the University of Missouri, became a writer.

== Career ==
In 1887, shortly after their marriage, the Eigenmanns went to Harvard University, where they spent a year studying the collections of fishes made by Louis Agassiz and Franz Steindachner, and produced the first of a series of joint publications. The results of the Eigenmanns' research at the Museum of Comparative Zoology in Cambridge, Massachusetts, were published in a series of joint publications, including their first report on South American fishes, a precursor to their major work that would follow several years later. The first of their first co-authored publications included "A list of the American species of Gobiidae and Callionymidae, with notes on the specimens contained in the Museum of Comparative Zoology, at Cambridge, Massachusetts," in the Proceedings of the California Academy of Sciences (1888); "Preliminary notes on South American Nematognathi" in the Proceedings of the California Academy of Sciences (1888); and "South American Nematognathi" in the American Naturalist (1888). This series of papers also made the "Eigenmann and Eigenmann" authors well known in the United States and in Europe.

After a year at Harvard and a summer at Woods Hole, Massachusetts, in 1888, they Eigenmanns returned to San Diego, California, where he became a curator at the Natural History Society of San Diego and helped found the San Diego Biological Laboratory. Among the most important of his research on the West Coast during this time period was his study of Cymatogaster aggregatus, published as "On the viviparous fishes of the Pacific coast of North America" in the Bulletin of the U.S. Commission of Fisheries for 1892. The Eigenmanns also continued to research and write about South American fishes. Major works included A revision of the South American Nematognathi or cat-fishes (1890) for a California Academy of Sciences publication and another of their co-authored works, "A catalogue of the fresh-water fishes of South America" (1892), that appeared in the Proceedings of the U.S. National Museum.

Eigenmann, who began his forty-year career at IU as an instructor of zoology in 1886–87, returned to Bloomington, Indiana, in 1891, when David Starr Jordan left IU to become the first president at Stanford University. Eigenmann was appointed as Jordan's replacement at IU as a professor of zoology. In addition to teaching at IU, Eigenmann was named director of the Biological Survey of Indiana in 1892 and founded a freshwater biological station in northern Indiana in 1895, serving as the first director of the station until the early 1920s.

Eigenmann also continued to conduct field research. In 1890–92, famed scientist Albert C. L. G. Günther financed Eigenmann's first expedition for the British Museum to western North America. Nearly 20 percent of the 65 species they collected were new. The expedition's findings, "Results of explorations in Western Canada and Northwestern United States," were published in the Bulletin of the U.S. Fish Commission for 1894. Subsequent explorations focused on the blind vertebrates, including cave fishes and salamanders, found in Indiana, Kentucky, Texas, Missouri, and Cuba. Eigenmann co-supervised Effa Muhse the first female to graduate with a PhD from Indiana University.

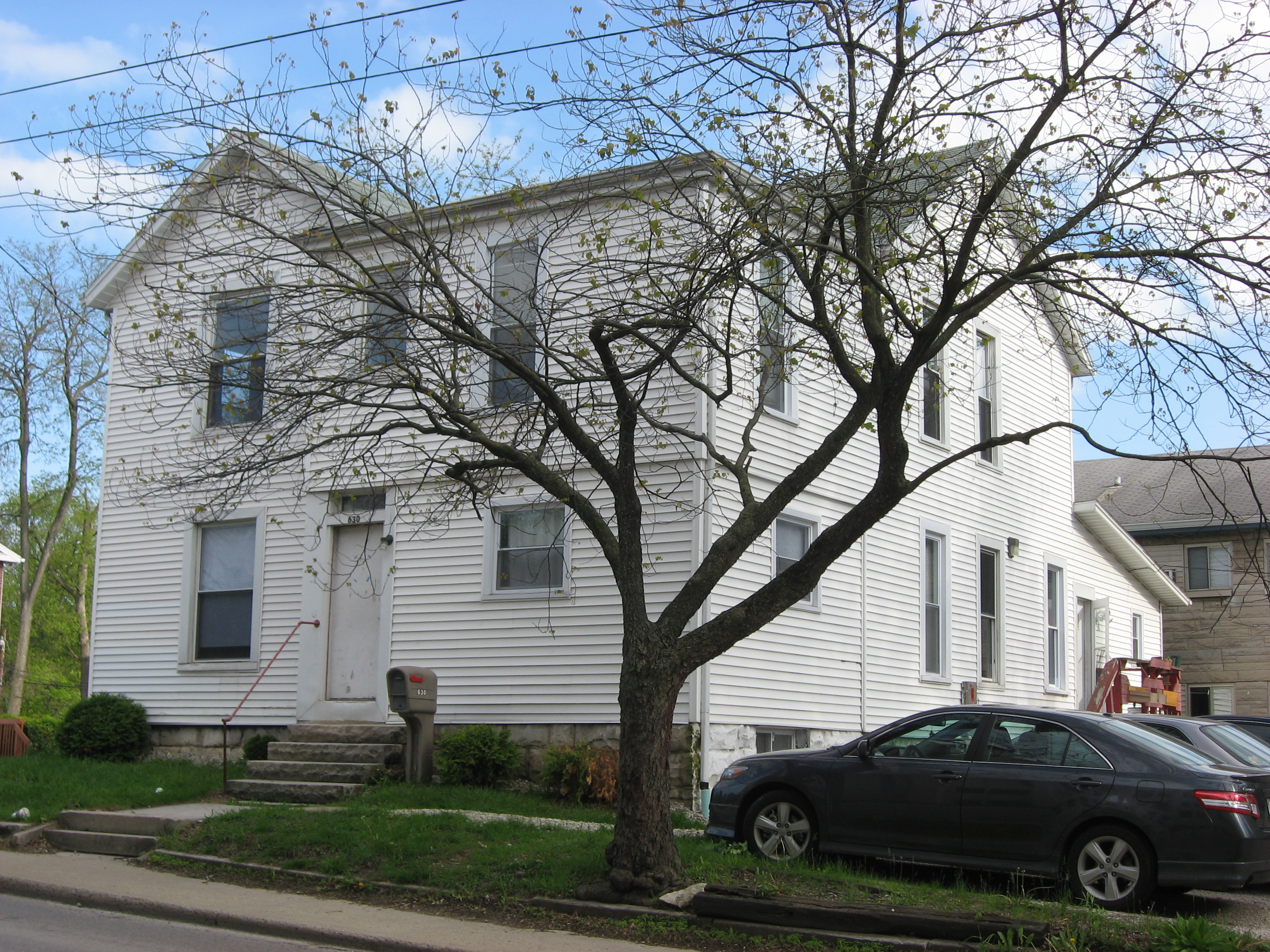
Eigenmann's house in Bloomington

After a trip to the University of Freiburg in 1906–07, Eigenmann was named the first dean of the IU graduate school in 1908, and retained the post until his death in 1927. While he remained at IU, Eigenmann also served from 1909 to 1918 as honorary curator of fishes at the Carnegie Museum in Pittsburgh, Pennsylvania.

In 1906, he received an invitation to join John C. Branner on an expedition to Brazil. Eigenmann could not attend but he did not want to miss the opportunity to gain from Branner's knowledge. He convinced William Jacob Holland with the Carnegie Museum to sponsor Indiana University student John D.Haseman in his stead. Haseman was late getting to Brazil in 1907 but met Branner as he was returning home and was given much valuable information. Haseman returned home in 1910 with a collection of fishes second only in size to Harvard's Agassiz collections.

In 1907 he secured support from the Carnegie Museum for a trip to South America. Eigenmann arrived in Georgetown, Guyana, on September 6, 1908, when the Carnegie British Guiana Expedition began. They returned to the United States with 25,000 specimens, resulting in the description of 28 new genera and 128 new species. In addition, two of Eigenmann's important works from his field research were published after his return from Guyana: "Cave Vertebrates of North America, a study of degenerative evolution" (1909) and "The fresh-water fishes of Patagonia and an examination of the Archiplata-Archelenis theory" in volume three of Reports of the Princeton University expeditions to Patagonian 1896–1899 (1909). Eigenmann made subsequent trips to South America that included Colombia (1912)(where he caught malaria) and the high Andes in Peru, Bolivia, and Chile (1918–19).

== Later years ==
During World War I Eigenmann remained in the United States, where he spent his time writing up reports on his previous expeditions. In addition to his administrative duties at IU, Eigenmann worked in the university laboratory at IU and at the Carnegie Museum in Pittsburgh. The first two parts of his five-volume masterwork, The American Characidae, were published in 1917 and 1918; volume three was published in 1921. Due to his failing health, manuscripts for the final two volumes were completed in 1925, with the assistance of George S. Myers on the final volume. The last two volumes were published posthumously in 1927 and 1929, respectively.

The high altitude of his final trip to South America in 1918–19 weakened his health and began years of decline. No longer able to conduct field research on his own, Eigenmann spent his later years assisting younger colleagues in mounting their own trips and sent some of his students, including Nathan Everett Pearson, on expeditions to the Atlantic slope of North America. Eigenmann also continued to write and present papers at academic conferences on various topics related to the fishes of North and South America. Almost every winter during this time he would travel to Florida to continue his research and better look after his health. He was elected to the National Academy of Sciences in 1923. In May 1926 Eignemann's declining health caused the family to leave Bloomington, Indiana, and return to San Diego, California, where he suffered a stroke in 1927.

== Death and legacy ==
Eigenmann died at a hospital in Chula Vista, California, on April 24, 1927; his remains are interred in San Diego.

Eigenmann was known for the "painstaking, careful, deliberate qualities" of his zoological research. Especially notable are his published papers relating to his studies of the freshwater fishes of South America, the evolution and systematics of South American fishes, and for his analysis of degenerative evolution based on his studies of the blind cave fishes found in parts of North America and in Cuba. His studies of blind cave fishes led him to conclude that "the degenerative characteristics of subdued coloration and of blindness become inherited when they have adaptive environmental value." Eigenmann's five-volume work, The American Characidae, is among his most significant, as are the published papers related to his studies of the blind cave fishes of North America and the papers where he supported the Archiplata-Archhelenis theory.

Eigenmann's students remembered him as an "inspiring teacher" who encouraged students to "find things for themselves." He also left a legacy of genera and species classification in the field of ichthyology, as well as the scientific methodology he taught his many students. David Starr Jordan, Eigenmann's mentor at Indiana University, credited Eigenmann and his students with identifying 155 new genera; another 35 by Eigenmann and his wife, Rosa Smith Eigenmann; and five additional genre with Jordan, for a total of 195 genera containing nearly 600 species.

== Honors and tributes ==
Eigenmann was a member of numerous scientific organizations, including the American Geographical Society and the American Society of Naturalists, among others. He was also a fellow of the American Association for the Advancement of Science, a member and past president of the Indiana Academy of Science, an honorary member of the California Academy of Sciences, and of the Sociedad de Ciencias Naturales of Bogotá, Colombia. In addition, Eigenmann was a member of Sigma XI, a science honorary, as well as Phi Beta Kappa. He was elected to the American Philosophical Society in 1917 and the National Academy of Sciences in 1923.

=== Eponyms ===
Carl Eigenmann is commemorated in the scientific names of a number of species, including:

- Cercosaura eigenmanni, a South American lizard.
- Astroblepus eigenmanni is a species of catfish of the family Astroblepidae named after Eigenman.
- The fish Carlana eigenmanni is named after him.
- The fish Copella eigenmanni is named after him.
- Eigenmannia spp. Jordan & Evermann 1896; a South American knifefish.

=== Eigenmann Hall ===
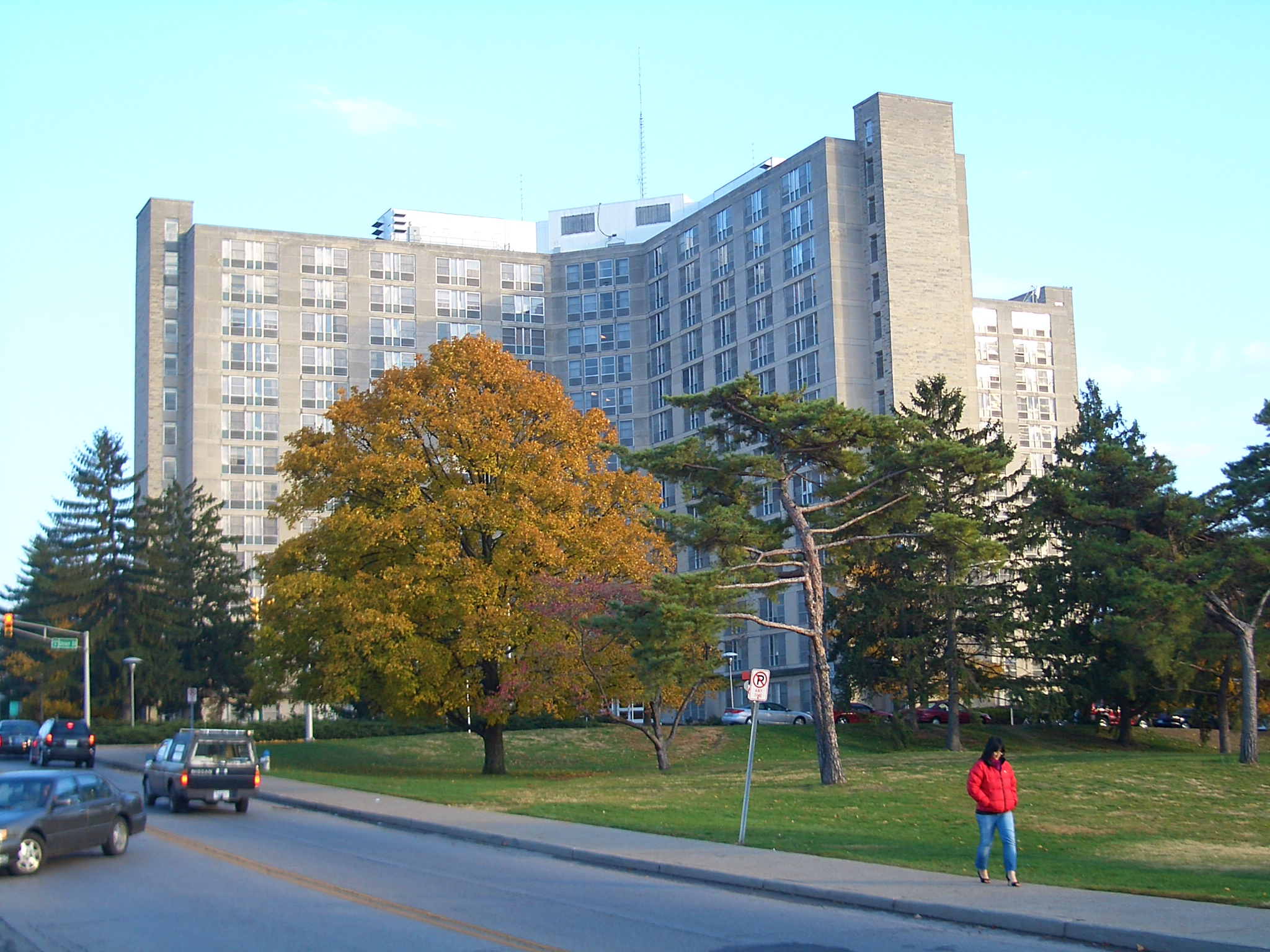
Carl H. Eigenmann Hall, Indiana University, Bloomington

In 1970, a newly constructed residence hall building on the Indiana University's Bloomington campus, designed by Eggers & Higgins to be the tallest building in Monroe County, Indiana, was named after Carl H. Eigenmann. Until 1998 the residence hall was reserved for the graduate students, as well as other students who were either over the age of twenty-one or admitted as foreign students. Since 1998 the Eigenmann Residence Center had housed American undergraduate students as well.

== Selected published works ==
Eigenmann was the author or co-author of 228 publications, including twenty-five with his wife, Rosa Smith Eigenmann.

Authored:

- "A review of the genera and species of Diodontidae found in American waters," Annals of the New York Academy of Science (1886) 3: 297–311
- "On the viviparous fishes of the Pacific coast of North America," "Bulletin of the United States Commission of Fisheries for 1892" (1894) 381–478
- "Results of explorations in Western Canada and Northwestern United States," "Bulletin of the United States Commission of Fisheries for 1894" (1894) 101–32
- Cave vertebrates of America; a study in degenerative evolution (Washington, D.C.: Carnegie Institution, 1909)
- "The fresh-water fishes of Patagonia and an examination of the Archiplata-Archelenis theory," Reports of the Princeton University expeditions to Patagonian 1896–1899 (1909) 3:227–374 (Princeton, New Jersey: Princeton University, 1905–11)
- "The Freshwater Fishes of British Guiana, including a study of the ecological grouping of species, and the relation of the fauna of the plateau to that of the lowlands," Memoirs of the Carnegie Museum (1912) 5:1–578
- "On Apareiodon, a new genus of characid fishes," Annals of the Carnegie Museum (1916) 10: 71–76
- The American Characidae, In Memoirs of the Museum of Comparative Zoology at Harvard College (1917–29) 43:1–558
- "The fishes of the rivers draining the western slope of the Cordillera Occidental of Colombia, Rios Atrato, San Juan, Dagua, and Patia," (1920) Indiana University Studies 7, no. 46:19
- "The fishes of Western South America. Part I." (1922) Memoirs of the Carnegie Museum 10, no. 1: 1–346

Co-authored with Rosa Smith Eigenmann:

- "A list of the American species of Gobiidae and Callionymidae, with notes on the specimens contained in the Museum of Comparative Zoology, at Cambridge, Massachusetts," Proceedings of the California Academy of Sciences (1888) 2 (ser. 1): 51–78
- "Cyprinodon californiensis," The West-American Scientist (1888) 5: 3–4
- "Notes on some Californian fishes, with descriptions of two new species," Proceedings of the U.S. National Museum (1888) 11: 463–66
- "Preliminary notes on South American Nematognathi" Proceedings of the California Academy of Sciences (1888) 2 (ser. 1): 119–72; and 2 (ser. 2), pp. 28–56
- "South American Nematognathi," American Naturalist (1888) 23: 647–49
- "Contributions from the San Diego biological laboratory," The West-American Scientist (1889) 6: 44–47
- "Description of a new species of Cyprinodon," Proceedings of the California Academy of Sciences (1889) 2 (ser. 1): 270
- "Description of new Nematogathoid fishes from Brazil," The West-American Scientist (1889) 6: 8–10
- "Notes from the San Diego biological laboratory, I. The fishes of Cortez banks; additions to the fauna of San Diego; fishes of Aetna springs, Napa county, California; fishes of Allen springs, Lake county, California," The West-American Scientist (1889) 6: 123–32; 147–50
- "On the development of California food fishes," American Naturalist (1889) 23: 107–10
- "On the genesis of the color-cells of fishes," The West-American Scientist (1889) 6: 61–62
- "On the phosphorescent spots of Porichthys margaritatus," The West-American Scientist (1889) 6: 32–34
- "Preliminary descriptions of new species and genera of Characinidae," The West-American Scientist (1889) 6: 7–8
- "A review of the Erythrininae," Proceedings of the California Academy of Sciences (1889) 2 (ser. 2): 100–16
- "A revision of the edentulous genera of Curimatinae," Annuals of the New York Academy of Science (1889) 4: 409–40
- "The young stages of some selachians," American Naturalist (1888) 25: 150–51; and also: The West-American Scientist (1889) 6: 150–51
- "Additions to the fauna of San Diego," Proceedings of the California Academy of Sciences (1890) 2 (ser. 3): 1–24
- "Descriptions of new species of Sebastodes," Proceedings of the California Academy of Sciences (1890) 2 (ser. 3): 36–38
- A revision of the South American Nematognathi or cat-fishes (San Francisco: California Academy of Sciences, 1890)
- "Cottus beldingi, sp. nov.," American Naturalist (1891) 25: 1132–33
- "Recent additions to the ichthyological fauna of California," Proceedings of the California Academy of Sciences (1891) p. 159–61
- "A catalogue of the fishes of the Pacific coast of America, north of Cerros island," Annuals of the New York Academy of Science (1892) 6: 349–58
- "A catalogue of the fresh-water fishes of South America," Proceedings of the U.S. National Museum (1892) 14: 1–81
- "New fishes from western Canada," American Naturalist (1892) 26: 961–64
- "Preliminary descriptions of new fishes from the Northwest," American Naturalist (1893) 27: 151–54

Co-authored with David Starr Jordan:

- "Notes on skeletons of Etheostomatinae," Proceedings of the U.S. National Museum (1885) 8: 68–72.

Co-authored with Clarence Hamilton Kennedy:

- "The Leptocephalus of the American eel and other American Leptocephali," Bulletin of the United States Fish Commission (1901) 21:81–92

Co-authored with Arthur Wilbur Henn and Charles Branch Wilson:

- "New fishes from Western Colombia, Ecuador, and Peru," Indiana University Studies (1914)19: 1–15
