= Wildlife of Sierra Leone =

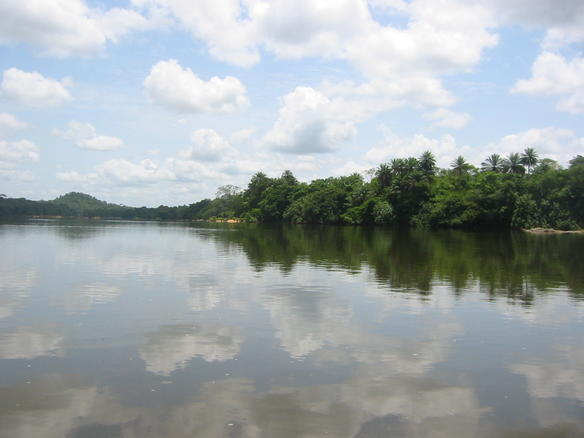
Tiwai Island River

The wildlife of Sierra Leone is very diverse due to the variety of different habitats within the country. Sierra Leone is home to approximately 2090 known higher plant species, 147 known species of mammals, 172 known breeding bird species, 67 known reptile species, 35 known amphibian species and 99 known species of fish.

== Mammals ==
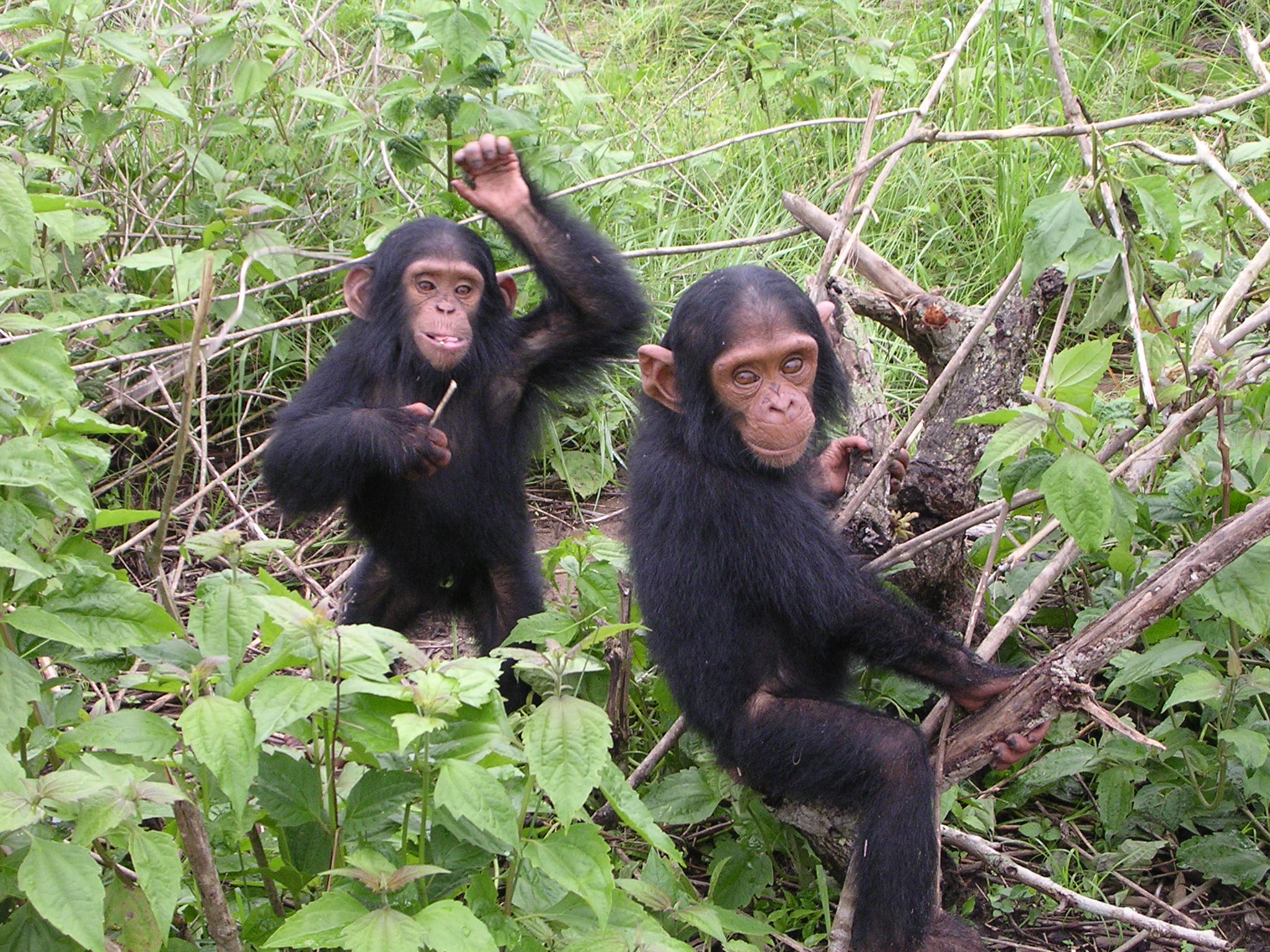
Young chimpanzees

There are approximately 147 known species of wild mammals within Sierra Leone. Members of fourteen orders of placental mammals inhabit Sierra Leone. The endangered pygmy hippopotamus has territories around the islands on the Moa River and is widespread in the Gola Forest area. There are three species of wild pig that occur across Sierra Leone: the wart hog, the giant forest hog and the red river hog.

Sierra Leone has 15 identified species of primates that include bushbaby, monkeys and a great ape, the common chimpanzee which is Sierra Leone's largest primate. Chimpanzees are found across the country with the 2010 chimpanzee census estimated a wild population in excess of 5500 more than double the number previously thought to live in the country. This is the second largest population of the endangered subspecies of western chimpanzee, after Guinea, with the largest density in the Loma area, 2.69 individuals per km^{2}, and the Outamba, with 1.21 individuals per km^{2}.

There are several species of whales and the African manatee in the waters of Sierra Leone. The manatee is an endangered species and lives in the rivers and estuaries of Sierra Leone especially around Bonthe.

Mammals found in Sierra Leone include:

- Hippopotamus
- African forest elephant
- Bongo
- Duiker
- African forest buffalo
- Diana monkey
- African leopard
- Olive baboon
- Guinea baboon
- Western chimpanzee
- Waterbuck
- Western red colobus
- Red colobus
- Green monkey
- Red river hog
- Warthog
- Lesser spot-nosed monkey
- Black-and-white colobus
- Pygmy hippopotamus
- Serval
- African wild dog

== Birds ==
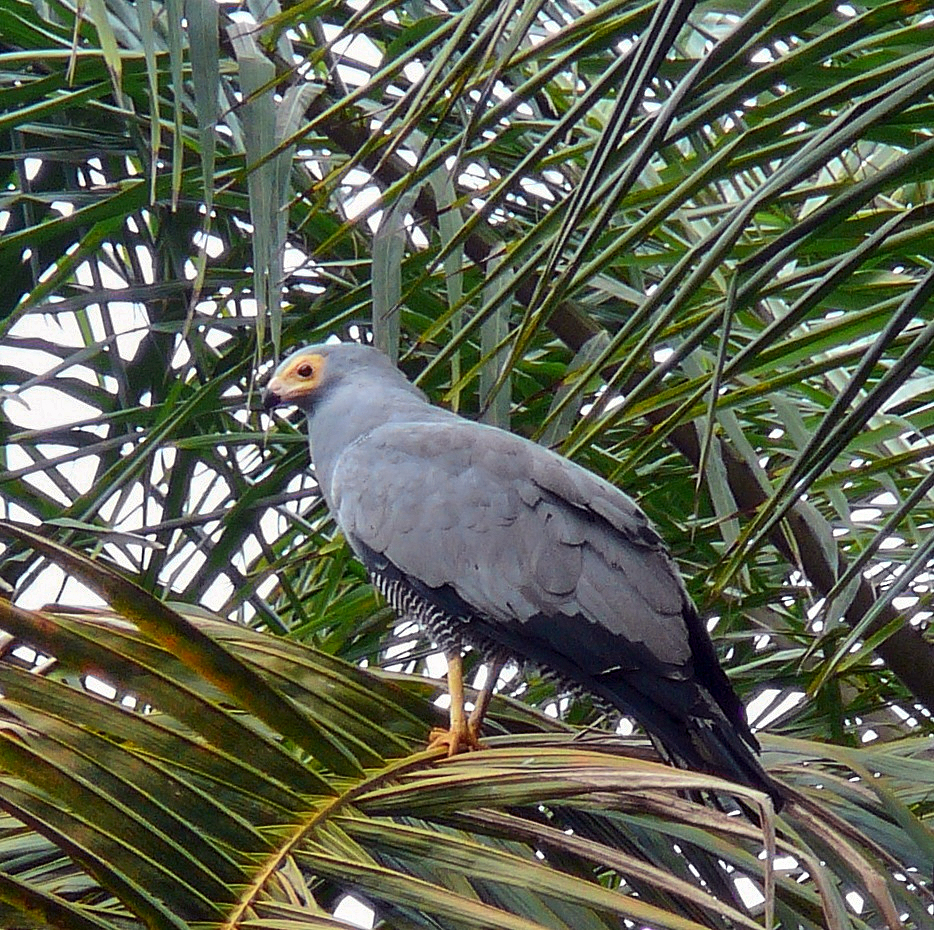
African harrier hawk

Sierra Leone has over 630 known species of bird ten of which are considered endangered including rufous fishing-owl and Gola malimbe. On the coastal area there are several important sites for migratory ducks and wading birds from the Palearctic realm.

- African harrier-hawk
- Black-collared lovebird
- Blue-headed wood-dove
- Iris glossy-starling
- White-breasted guineafowl
- White-necked rockfowl
- North African ostrich
- Savanna sparrow

== Reptiles ==
There are 67 known species of reptiles, three of which are endangered, in Sierra Leone including several large reptiles. There are three species of crocodiles, the West African crocodile, the slender-snouted crocodile which lives in forest streams, dwarf crocodile found in mangrove swamps. All the species of sea turtles live in the waters of Sierra Leone with the green turtle and leatherback turtle laying eggs on the shores including on Sherbro Island and Turtle Island. Common species of lizard include the large Nile monitor, the agama seen around settlements, the Brook's house gecko often lives inside houses, and chamaeleos.

== Amphibians ==
As of 2009, the critically endangered Tai toad was discovered in the Gola Forest, which was thought to be endemic to Taï National Park in Ivory Coast.

== Fish ==
A snake eel is a marine fish only known from a single specimen found in the gut of another fish off the coast of Sierra Leone. The country also hosts a number of killifish in the genus Scriptaphyosemion as well as a number of freshwater catfish, including a species of electric catfish.

== Invertebrates ==
Sierra Leone has around 750 species of butterflies. Including one of the largest butterflies the giant African swallowtail the wingspan of which can be up to 25 cm. In a study in 2011, 140 species of dragonflies and damselflies were found. It is estimated that this represents 80% of the species found in Sierra Leone.

== Flora ==
Wild plant types include the lowland moist and semi-deciduous forests, part of the Western Guinean lowland forests, inland valley swamps, wooded savannah, bolilands and mangrove swamps. There are about 2,000 known species of plants with 74 species only occurring only in Sierra Leone. Primary rainforest used to cover around 70% of Sierra Leone in the mid-2000s this had reduced to around 6%. Common species include:

- Red mangrove which grows in swamp areas along the western coast
- Oil palm used for palm oil and palm wine
- Cotton tree one of which is a historical symbol of Freetown
- Red ironwood tree

== See also ==
- Cotton Tree, a kapok tree that was a historic symbol of Freetown
