= Wildlife of Guinea-Bissau =

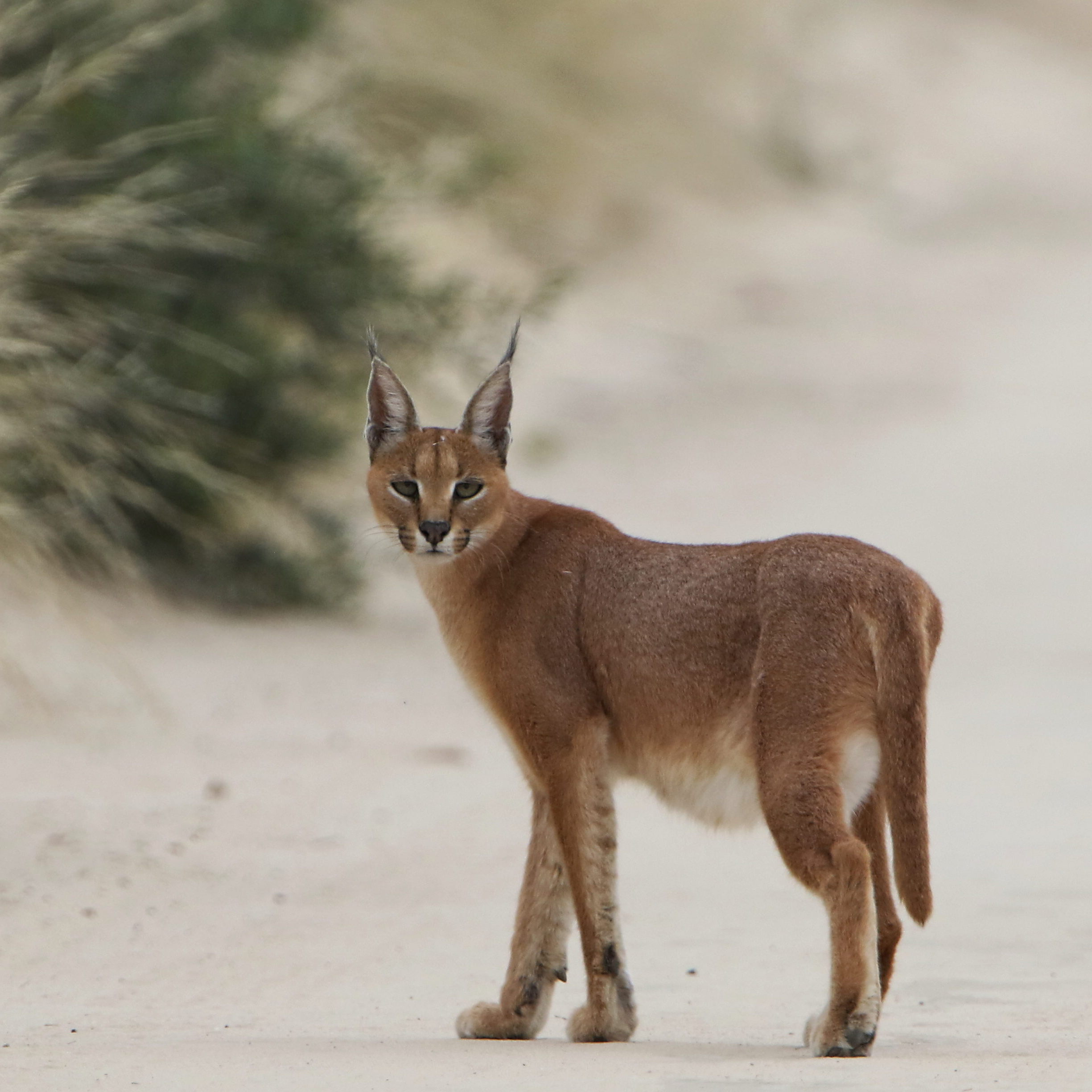
A caracal

Guinea-Bissau is a West-African country rich in biodiversity.

== Fauna ==
=== Mammals ===
==== Predators ====
There still is much debate about the status of many predator species in Guinea-Bissau. This is, in part, because much of the country remains unstudied, and because of the cryptic nature of many predator species. The lion, for instance, was listed as possibly extinct in Guinea-Bissau during the 2014 assessment of the lion by the IUCN Red List of Threatened Species. However, a picture of a lion was still recorded by a camera trap in 2016 the southeastern Boé region.

- Lion (Panthera leo)
- Leopard (Panthera pardus)
- African wild dog (Lycaon pictus)
- African golden cat (Caracal aurata)
- Caracal (Caracal caracal)
- Serval (Leptailurus serval)
- Spotted hyena (Crocuta crocuta)
- African wildcat (Felis lybica)

==== Primates ====
- Western chimpanzee (Pan troglodytes verus)

==== Herbivores ====
- Red river hog
- Warthog

=== Birds ===
- Blue-headed wood-dove
- Iris glossy-starling

=== Reptiles ===
- Bitis rhinoceros

=== Marine life ===
The tropical marine environment of Guinea-Bissau has a high diversity of sea life, notably in and around the Bijagós Archipelago. Fishes include the African butter catfish, Malapterurus occidentalis, Parablennius sierraensis (combtooth blenny), five Synodontis catfish species including annectens, ansorgii, nigrita, schall and waterloti, the three-banded butterflyfish and Trachinus pellegrini. Turtles are also dominant especially the West African mud turtle.

== Flora ==
- Flora of Guinea-Bissau

== See also ==
- João Vieira and Poilão Marine National Park
