= Malapterurus thysi =

Conservation status
- Near Threatened (IUCN 3.1)

Scientific classification
- Kingdom: Animalia
- Phylum: Chordata
- Class: Actinopterygii
- Order: Siluriformes
- Family: Malapteruridae
- Genus: Malapterurus
- Species: M. thysi

Binomial name
- Malapterurus thysi Norris, 2002

Species of fish

Malapterurus thysi is a species of electric catfish endemic to the Ivory Coast, where it occurs in the Cess (Nipoué) and Cavally river basins. This species grows to a length of 24 centimetres (9.4 in) SL.
