= Malapterurus stiassnyae =

Conservation status
- Least Concern (IUCN 3.1)

Scientific classification
- Kingdom: Animalia
- Phylum: Chordata
- Class: Actinopterygii
- Order: Siluriformes
- Family: Malapteruridae
- Genus: Malapterurus
- Species: M. stiassnyae

Binomial name
- Malapterurus stiassnyae Norris, 2002

Species of fish

Malapterurus stiassnyae is a species of electric catfish native to Guinea, Liberia and Sierra Leone. Members of this species grow to a length of 30 centimetres (12 in) SL.
