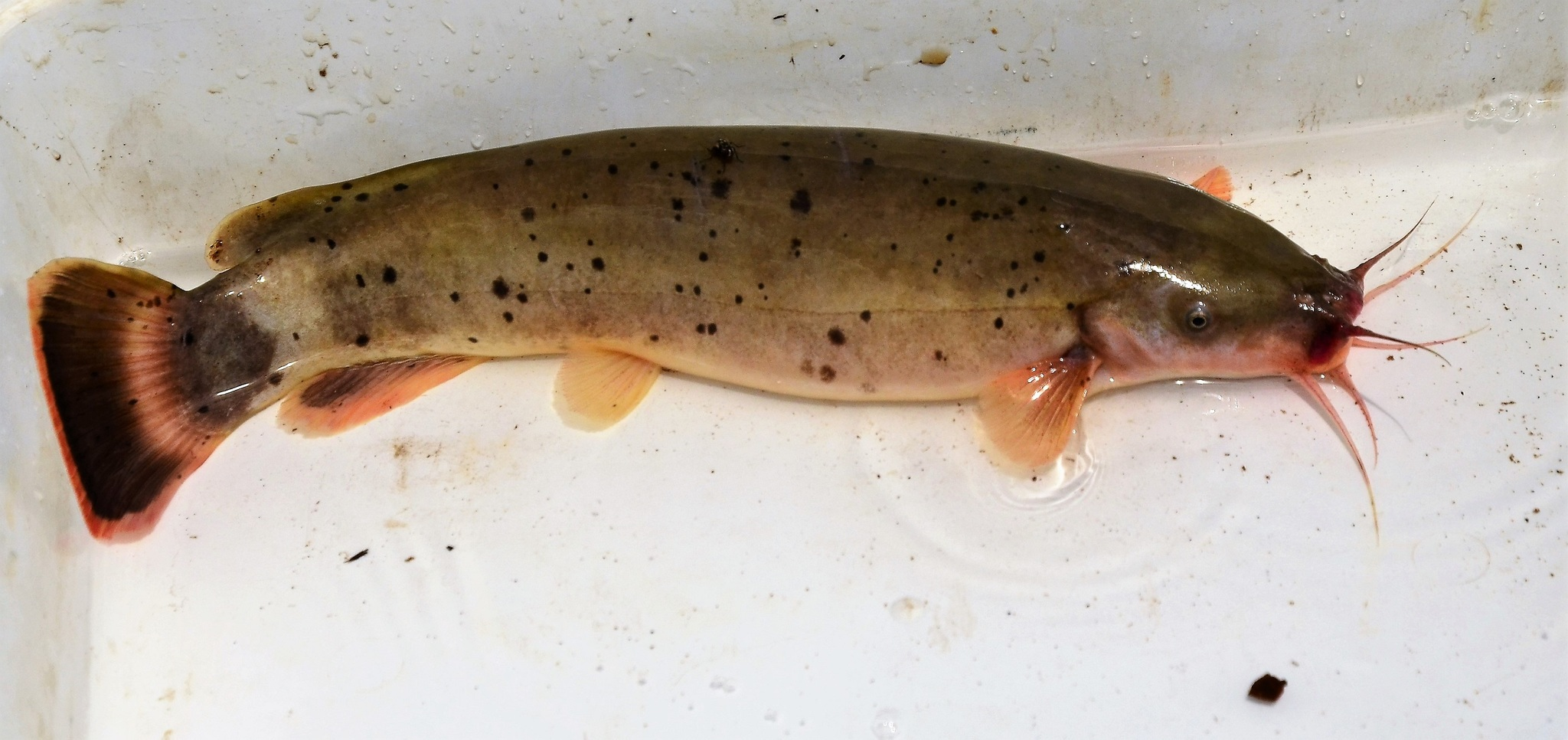

Conservation status
- Least Concern (IUCN 3.1)

Scientific classification
- Kingdom: Animalia
- Phylum: Chordata
- Class: Actinopterygii
- Order: Siluriformes
- Family: Malapteruridae
- Genus: Malapterurus
- Species: M. shirensis

Binomial name
- Malapterurus shirensis Roberts, 2000

= Malapterurus shirensis =

Species of fish

Malapterurus shirensis is a species of electric catfish native to the Zambezi River basin where it occurs in the countries of Mozambique, Zambia and Zimbabwe. This species grows to a length of 37.2 centimetres (14.6 in) SL.
