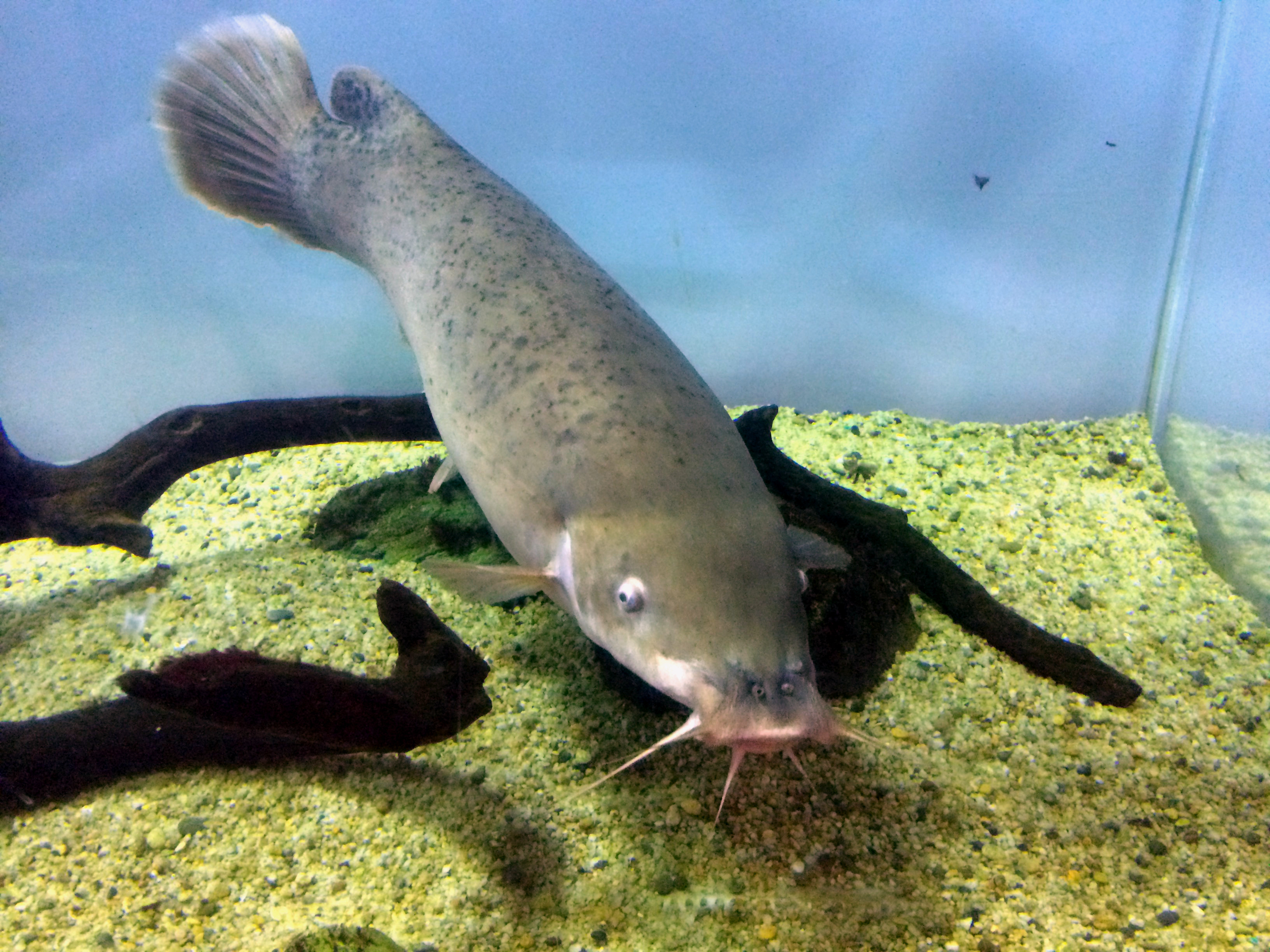

Conservation status
- Least Concern (IUCN 3.1)

Scientific classification
- Kingdom: Animalia
- Phylum: Chordata
- Class: Actinopterygii
- Order: Siluriformes
- Family: Malapteruridae
- Genus: Malapterurus
- Species: M. microstoma

Binomial name
- Malapterurus microstoma Poll & Gosse, 1969

= Malapterurus microstoma =

Species of fish

Malapterurus microstoma, the smallmouth electric catfish, is a species of electric catfish native to the Congo River basin of Central African Republic, the Democratic Republic of the Congo and the Republic of the Congo. This species grows to a length of 55.5 centimetres (21.9 in) SL. This fish can be found in the aquarium trade. It is illegal to possess any species of electric catfish for personal or commercial use in Florida.

== Etymology ==
The genus name Malapterurus comes from Ancient Greek μαλακός (malakós) meaning "soft", πτερόν (pterón), meaning "wing", and οὐρά (ourá), meaning "tail". The specific epithet microstoma comes from Ancient Greek μικρός (mikrós), meaning "small", and στόμα (stóma), meaning "mouth".
