= Malapterurus barbatus =

Conservation status
- Least Concern (IUCN 3.1)

Scientific classification
- Kingdom: Animalia
- Phylum: Chordata
- Class: Actinopterygii
- Order: Siluriformes
- Family: Malapteruridae
- Genus: Malapterurus
- Species: M. barbatus

Binomial name
- Malapterurus barbatus Norris, 2002

Species of fish

Malapterurus barbatus is a species of electric catfish native to Guinea, Sierra Leone and Liberia. This species grows to a length of 21.5 centimetres (8.5 in) SL.
