= Paradoxoglanis caudivittatus =

Conservation status
- Least Concern (IUCN 3.1)

Scientific classification
- Kingdom: Animalia
- Phylum: Chordata
- Class: Actinopterygii
- Order: Siluriformes
- Family: Malapteruridae
- Genus: Paradoxoglanis
- Species: P. caudivittatus

Binomial name
- Paradoxoglanis caudivittatus Norris, 2002

Species of fish

Paradoxoglanis caudivittatus is a species of electric catfish endemic to the Democratic Republic of the Congo where it is found in the Tshuapa and Lukenie River systems. This species grows to a length of 12.5 centimetres (4.9 in) SL.
