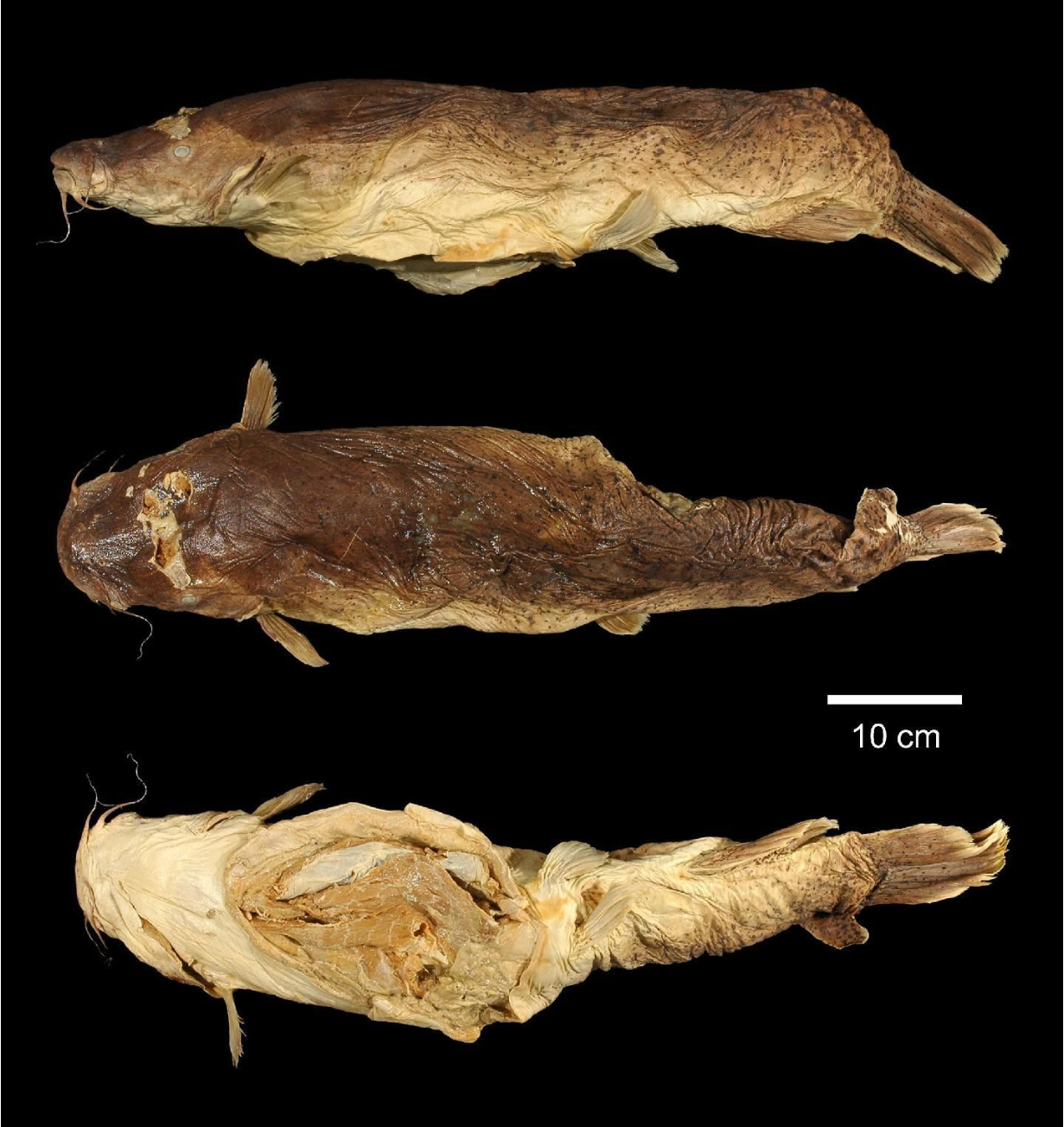
- The holotype

Scientific classification
- Kingdom: Animalia
- Phylum: Chordata
- Class: Actinopterygii
- Order: Siluriformes
- Family: Malapteruridae
- Genus: Malapterurus
- Species: M. monsembeensis

Binomial name
- Malapterurus monsembeensis Roberts, 2000

= Malapterurus monsembeensis =

Species of fish

Malapterurus monsembeensis is a species of electric catfish that occurs in the Congo River basin and is native to the countries of Angola, Central African Republic, the Democratic Republic of the Congo and the Republic of the Congo. This species grows to a length of 58 centimetres (23 in) SL.
