= Malapterurus oguensis =

Conservation status
- Least Concern (IUCN 3.1)

Scientific classification
- Domain: Eukaryota
- Kingdom: Animalia
- Phylum: Chordata
- Class: Actinopterygii
- Order: Siluriformes
- Family: Malapteruridae
- Genus: Malapterurus
- Species: M. oguensis

Binomial name
- Malapterurus oguensis Sauvage, 1879

Species of fish

Malapterurus oguensis is a species of electric catfish native to Cameroon, the Republic of the Congo, and Gabon. The species grows to a length of 21.5 centimetres (8.5 in) SL.
