= Malapterurus punctatus =

Conservation status
- Vulnerable (IUCN 3.1)

Scientific classification
- Kingdom: Animalia
- Phylum: Chordata
- Class: Actinopterygii
- Order: Siluriformes
- Family: Malapteruridae
- Genus: Malapterurus
- Species: M. punctatus

Binomial name
- Malapterurus punctatus Norris, 2002

Species of fish

Malapterurus punctatus is a species of electric catfish native to Côte d'Ivoire, Guinea, Liberia and Sierra Leone. This species grows to a length of 21.49 centimetres (8.46 in) SL.
