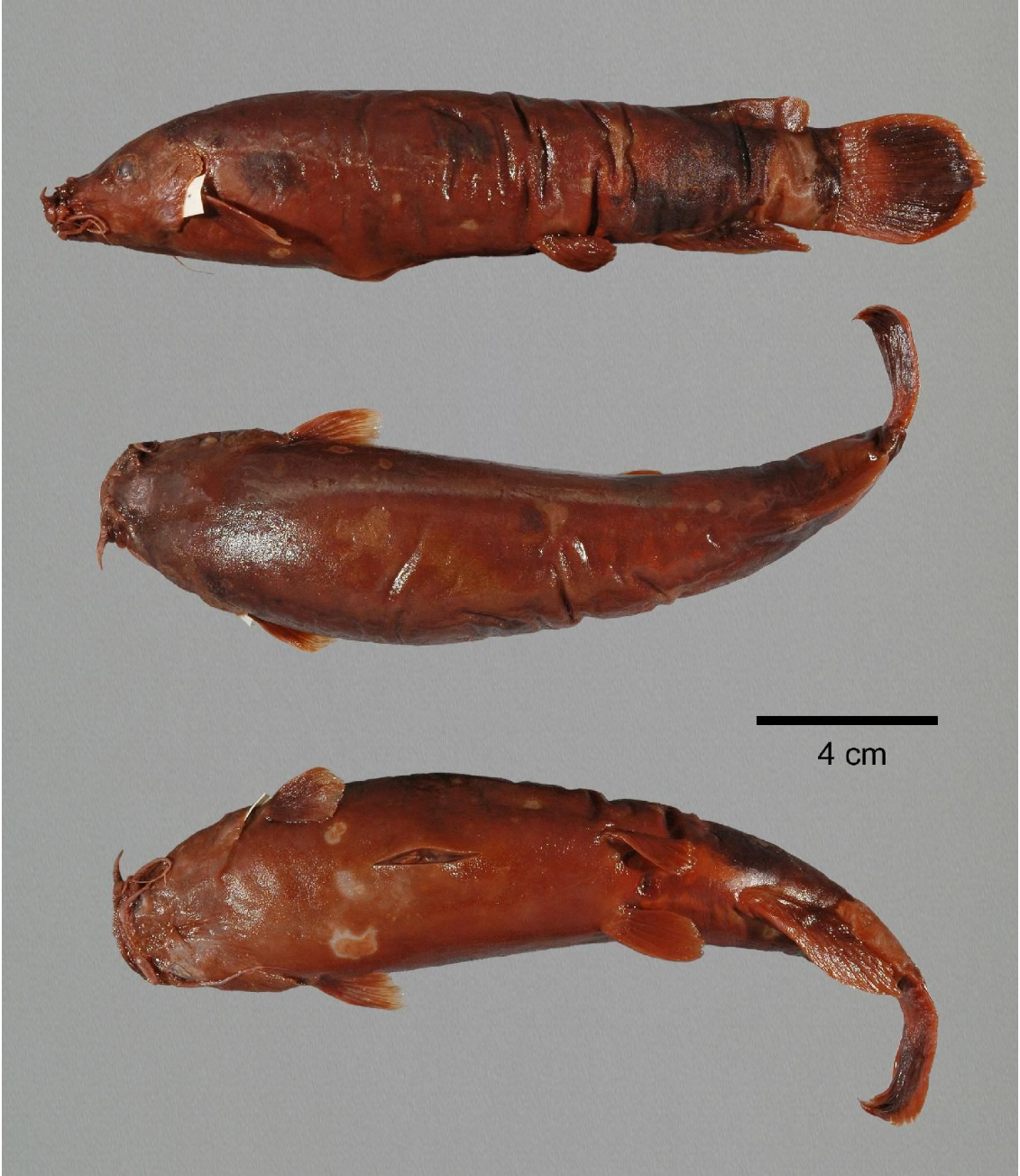
- A paratype

Conservation status
- Least Concern (IUCN 3.1)

Scientific classification
- Kingdom: Animalia
- Phylum: Chordata
- Class: Actinopterygii
- Order: Siluriformes
- Family: Malapteruridae
- Genus: Malapterurus
- Species: M. tanoensis

Binomial name
- Malapterurus tanoensis T. R. Roberts, 2000

Synonyms
- Malapterurus murrayi S. M. Norris, 2002

= Malapterurus tanoensis =

Species of fish

Malapterurus tanoensis is a species of electric catfish native to Côte d'Ivoire and Ghana where it occurs in the Ofin and Tano Rivers.

This species grows to a length of 26 centimetres (10 in) SL.
