= Malapterurus minjiriya =

Conservation status
- Least Concern (IUCN 3.1)

Scientific classification
- Domain: Eukaryota
- Kingdom: Animalia
- Phylum: Chordata
- Class: Actinopterygii
- Order: Siluriformes
- Family: Malapteruridae
- Genus: Malapterurus
- Species: M. minjiriya

Binomial name
- Malapterurus minjiriya Sagua, 1987

Species of fish

Malapterurus minjiriya is a species of electric catfish native to Burkina Faso, Ethiopia, Ghana, Mali, Nigeria and Togo. This species grows to a length of 102 centimetres (40 in) SL.
