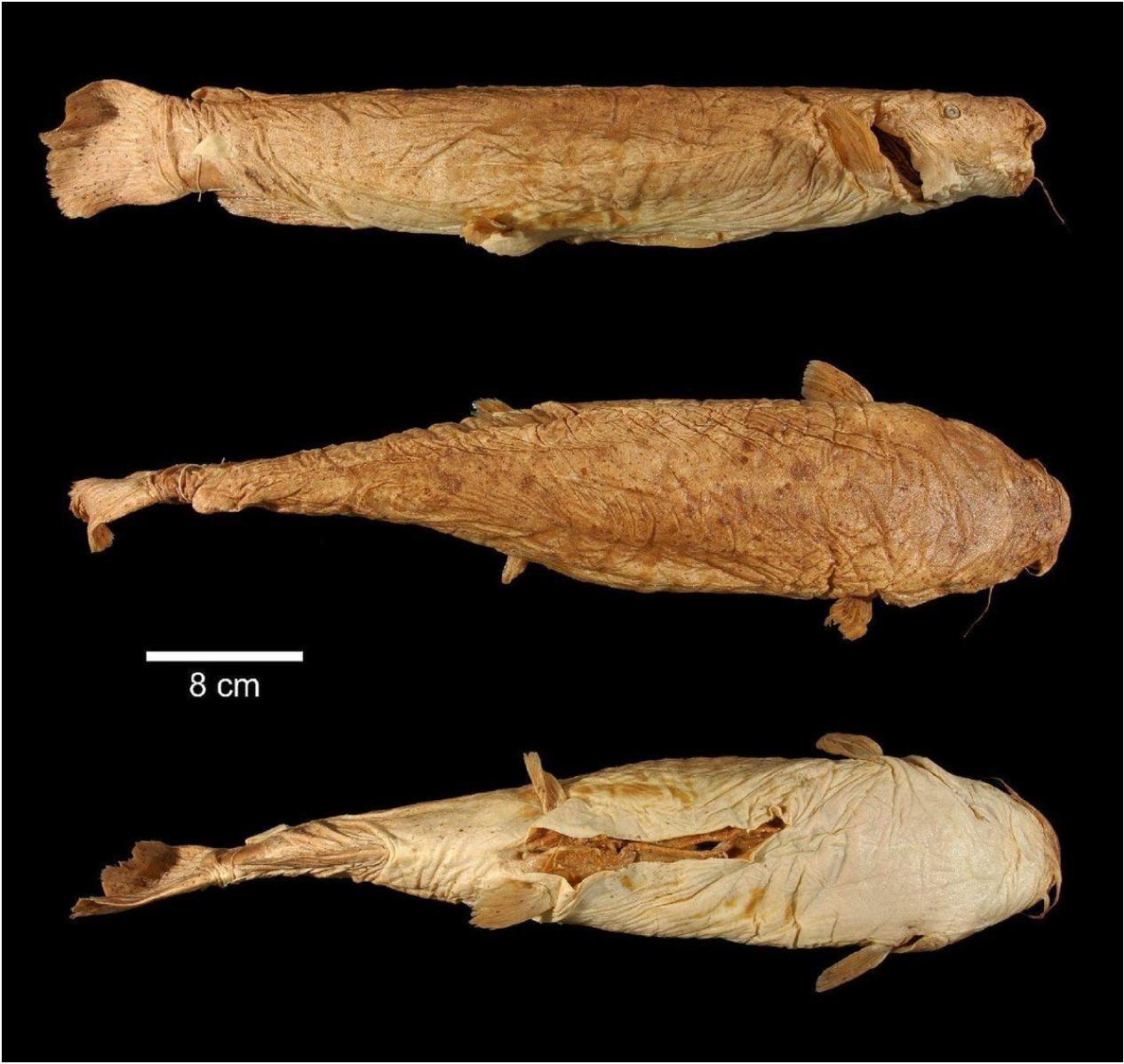
- The holotype

Conservation status
- Least Concern (IUCN 3.1)

Scientific classification
- Kingdom: Animalia
- Phylum: Chordata
- Class: Actinopterygii
- Order: Siluriformes
- Family: Malapteruridae
- Genus: Malapterurus
- Species: M. tanganyikaensis

Binomial name
- Malapterurus tanganyikaensis T. R. Roberts, 2000

Synonyms
- Malapterurus polli S. M. Norris, 2002

= Malapterurus tanganyikaensis =

Species of fish

Malapterurus tanganyikaensis is a species of electric catfish native to Lake Tanganyika where it occurs in the bordering nations of Burundi, the Democratic Republic of the Congo, Tanzania and Zambia. This species grows to a length of 49.5 centimetres (19.5 in) SL.
