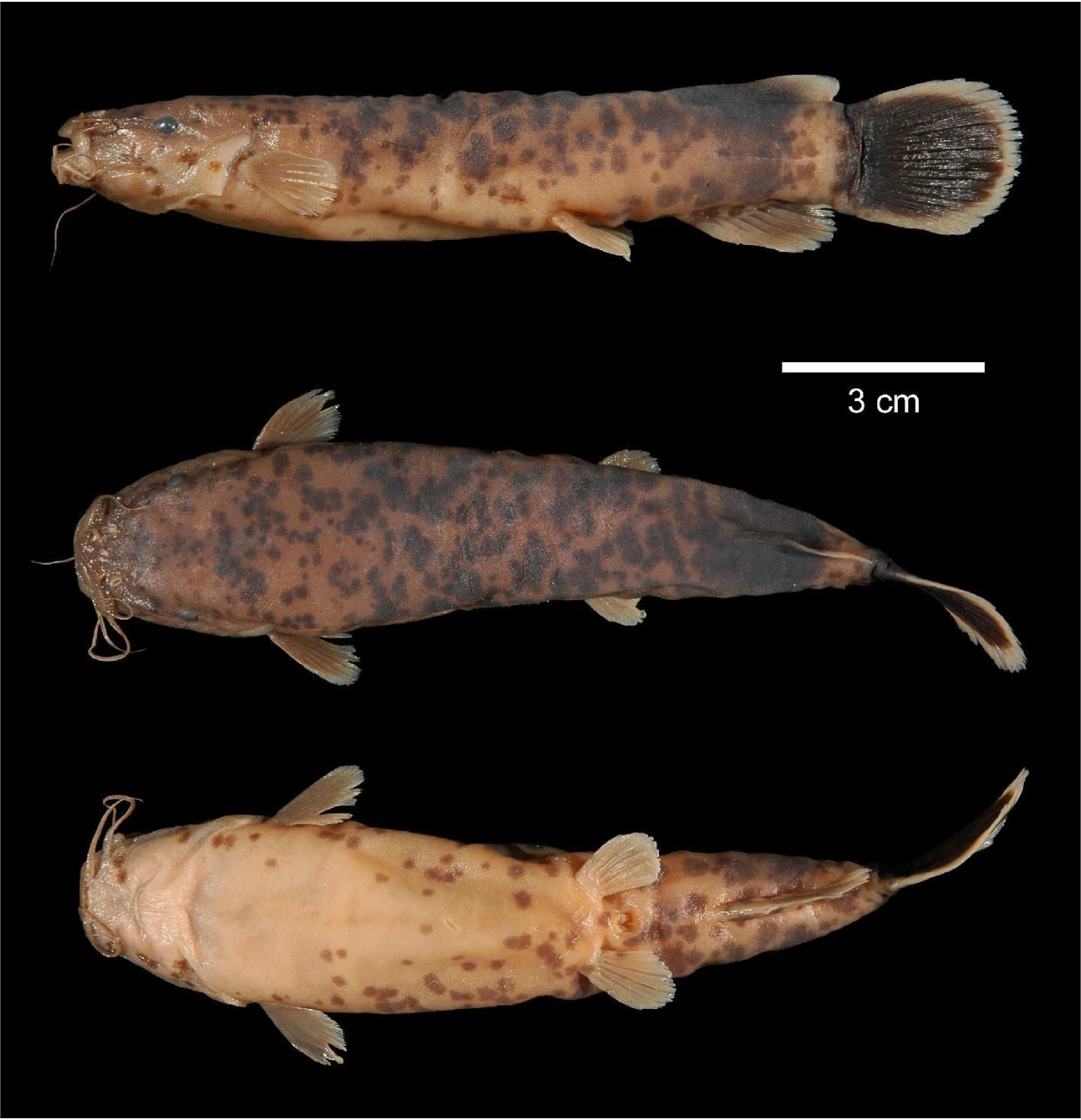
- The holotype

Conservation status
- Data Deficient (IUCN 3.1)

Scientific classification
- Kingdom: Animalia
- Phylum: Chordata
- Class: Actinopterygii
- Order: Siluriformes
- Family: Malapteruridae
- Genus: Malapterurus
- Species: M. cavalliensis

Binomial name
- Malapterurus cavalliensis Roberts, 2000

= Malapterurus cavalliensis =

Species of fish

Malapterurus cavalliensis is a species of electric catfish endemic to Ivory Coast where it occurs in the Cavally River. This species grows to a length of 12.15 centimetres (4.78 in) SL.
