= Paradoxoglanis parvus =

Conservation status
- Least Concern (IUCN 3.1)

Scientific classification
- Kingdom: Animalia
- Phylum: Chordata
- Class: Actinopterygii
- Order: Siluriformes
- Family: Malapteruridae
- Genus: Paradoxoglanis
- Species: P. parvus

Binomial name
- Paradoxoglanis parvus Norris, 2002

Species of fish

Paradoxoglanis parvus is a species of electric catfish endemic to the Democratic Republic of the Congo, where it is found in the Congo and Kumbinanimi River systems. This species grows to a length of 16.9 centimetres (6.7 in) SL.
