= Paradoxoglanis cryptus =

Conservation status
- Data Deficient (IUCN 3.1)

Scientific classification
- Kingdom: Animalia
- Phylum: Chordata
- Class: Actinopterygii
- Order: Siluriformes
- Family: Malapteruridae
- Genus: Paradoxoglanis
- Species: P. cryptus

Binomial name
- Paradoxoglanis cryptus Norris, 2002

Species of fish

Paradoxoglanis cryptus is a species of electric catfish endemic to the Democratic Republic of the Congo, where it occurs in the Kagala River. This species grows to a length of 11.9 centimetres (4.7 in) SL.
