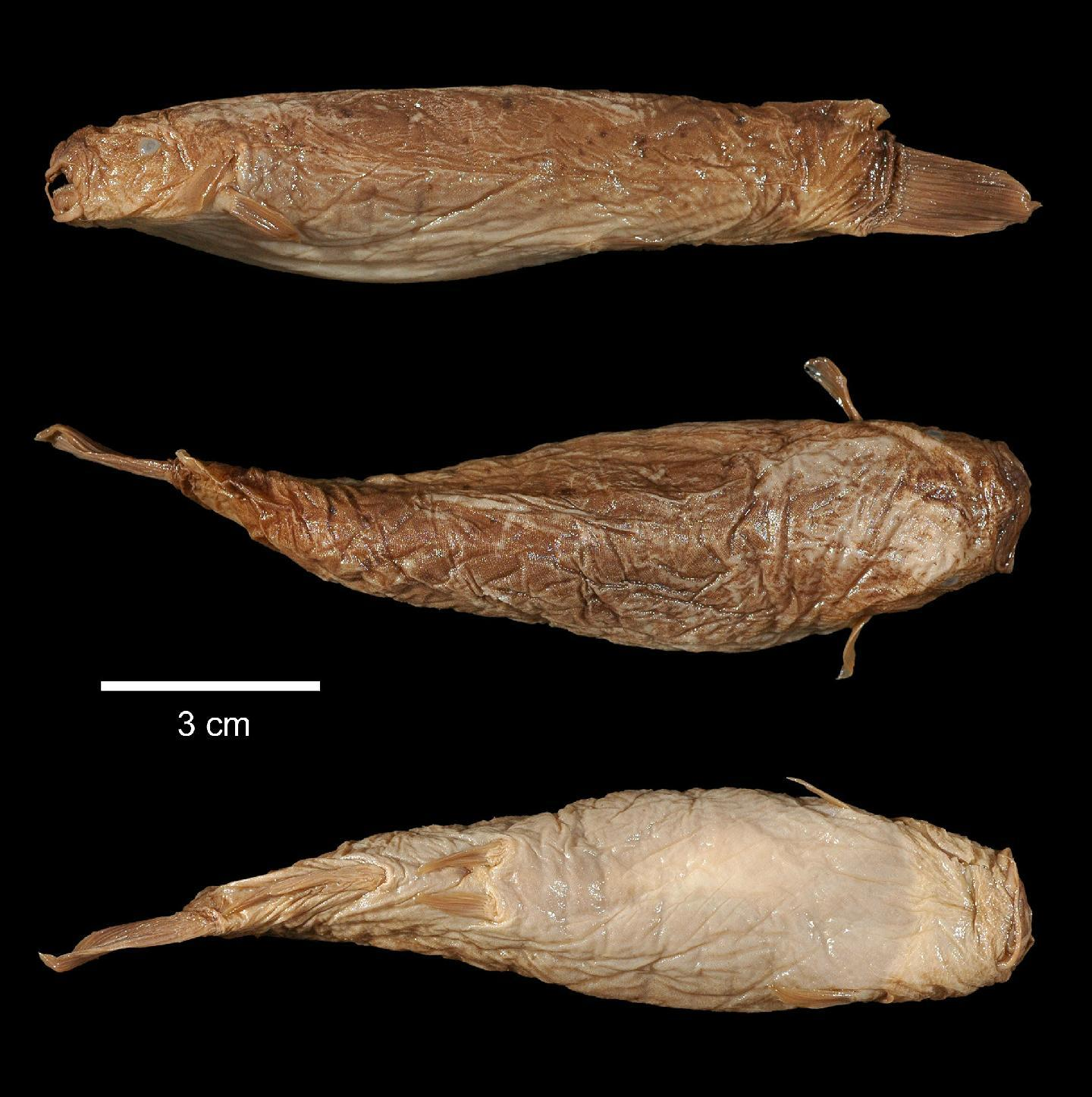

Conservation status
- Least Concern (IUCN 3.1)

Scientific classification
- Kingdom: Animalia
- Phylum: Chordata
- Class: Actinopterygii
- Order: Siluriformes
- Family: Malapteruridae
- Genus: Malapterurus
- Species: M. beninensis

Binomial name
- Malapterurus beninensis Murray, 1855

Synonyms
- Malapterurus affinis Günther, 1864

= Malapterurus beninensis =

Species of fish

Malapterurus beninensis is a species of electric catfish native to the African nations of Angola, Benin, Cameroon, the Democratic Republic of the Congo, the Republic of the Congo, Equatorial Guinea, Gabon, Ghana, Nigeria and Togo. This species grows to a length of 22 cm (9 in) SL. Its habitat is lowland marshes, rivers, and lakes.

== Description ==
M. beninensis is a fleshy, robust fish that grows to a maximum length of 22 cm (9 in). It has a fusiform body (tapered at both ends) with a large head and a thick caudal peduncle. The eyes are small and slit-like, and the jaws are either of equal length, or the lower jaw is slightly longer than the upper. There are three pairs of sensory barbels around the mouth. There is no dorsal fin, but there is an adipose fin close to the tail. The pectoral fins have seven to nine soft rays, the pelvic fins have six soft rays and the anal fin has eight to eleven soft rays. The colour is rather variable, being darker grey above and paler grey below, liberally sprinkled with dark spots on back and flanks. There is a dark saddle on the caudal peduncle and a dark bar in front of the caudal fin. The pelvic fins are colourless, but the pectoral fins and the outer margins of the anal fin and caudal fin are dusky. There are no scales, the lateral line is complete, and the swim bladder has two chambers.

== Distribution and habitat ==
M. beninensis occurs in lowland freshwater habitats in tropical West and Central Africa. Its range extends from Ghana to Angola and it is present on the island of Fernando Po. It lives in a range of habitats including rivers, streams, lakes, marshes and swamps.

== Ecology ==
This electric catfish has been little studied. It may lurk in holes in the riverbank and may even breed there. It is believed to feed on fishes, using its electric organ both to stun them and to ward off predators.

== Status ==
M. beninensis is caught for food and for the aquarium trade, and is used in research. However it has a wide range and is a common species, so the International Union for Conservation of Nature has assessed its conservation status as being of least concern.
