= Malapterurus melanochir =

Conservation status
- Least Concern (IUCN 3.1)

Scientific classification
- Kingdom: Animalia
- Phylum: Chordata
- Class: Actinopterygii
- Order: Siluriformes
- Family: Malapteruridae
- Genus: Malapterurus
- Species: M. melanochir

Binomial name
- Malapterurus melanochir Norris, 2002

Species of fish

Malapterurus melanochir is a species of electric catfish endemic to the Democratic Republic of the Congo, where it occurs in the upper and middle Congo River basin. This species grows to a length of 98 centimetres (39 in) SL.
