= Malapterurus teugelsi =

Conservation status
- Vulnerable (IUCN 3.1)

Scientific classification
- Kingdom: Animalia
- Phylum: Chordata
- Class: Actinopterygii
- Order: Siluriformes
- Family: Malapteruridae
- Genus: Malapterurus
- Species: M. teugelsi

Binomial name
- Malapterurus teugelsi Norris, 2002

Species of fish

Malapterurus teugelsi is a species of electric catfish endemic to Guinea where it occurs in the Kogon River. This species grows to a length of 21.2 centimetres (8.3 in) SL.

The fish is named in honor of Belgian ichthyologist Guy Teugels (1954-2003), who as curator of fishes at the Musée Royale de l'Afrique Centrale, collected the type specimen.
