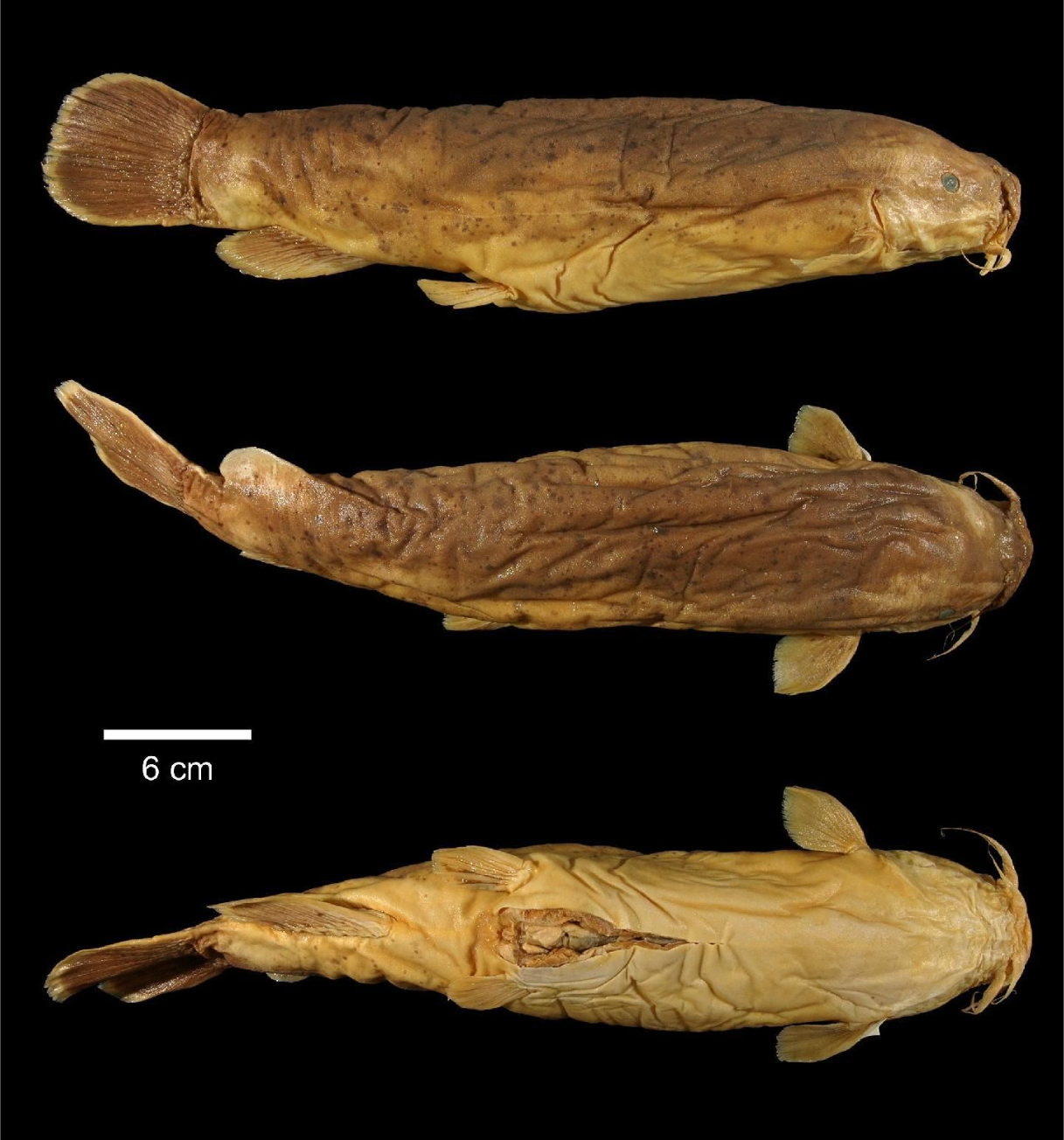
- The holotype

Conservation status
- Least Concern (IUCN 3.1)

Scientific classification
- Kingdom: Animalia
- Phylum: Chordata
- Class: Actinopterygii
- Order: Siluriformes
- Family: Malapteruridae
- Genus: Malapterurus
- Species: M. occidentalis

Binomial name
- Malapterurus occidentalis Norris, 2002

= Malapterurus occidentalis =

Species of fish

Malapterurus occidentalis is a species of electric catfish native to Gambia and Guinea-Bissau, where it occurs in the Gambia and Géba Rivers. This species grows to a length of 32 centimetres (13 in) SL.
