= Mastaba of Ti =

Archaeological site in Egypt

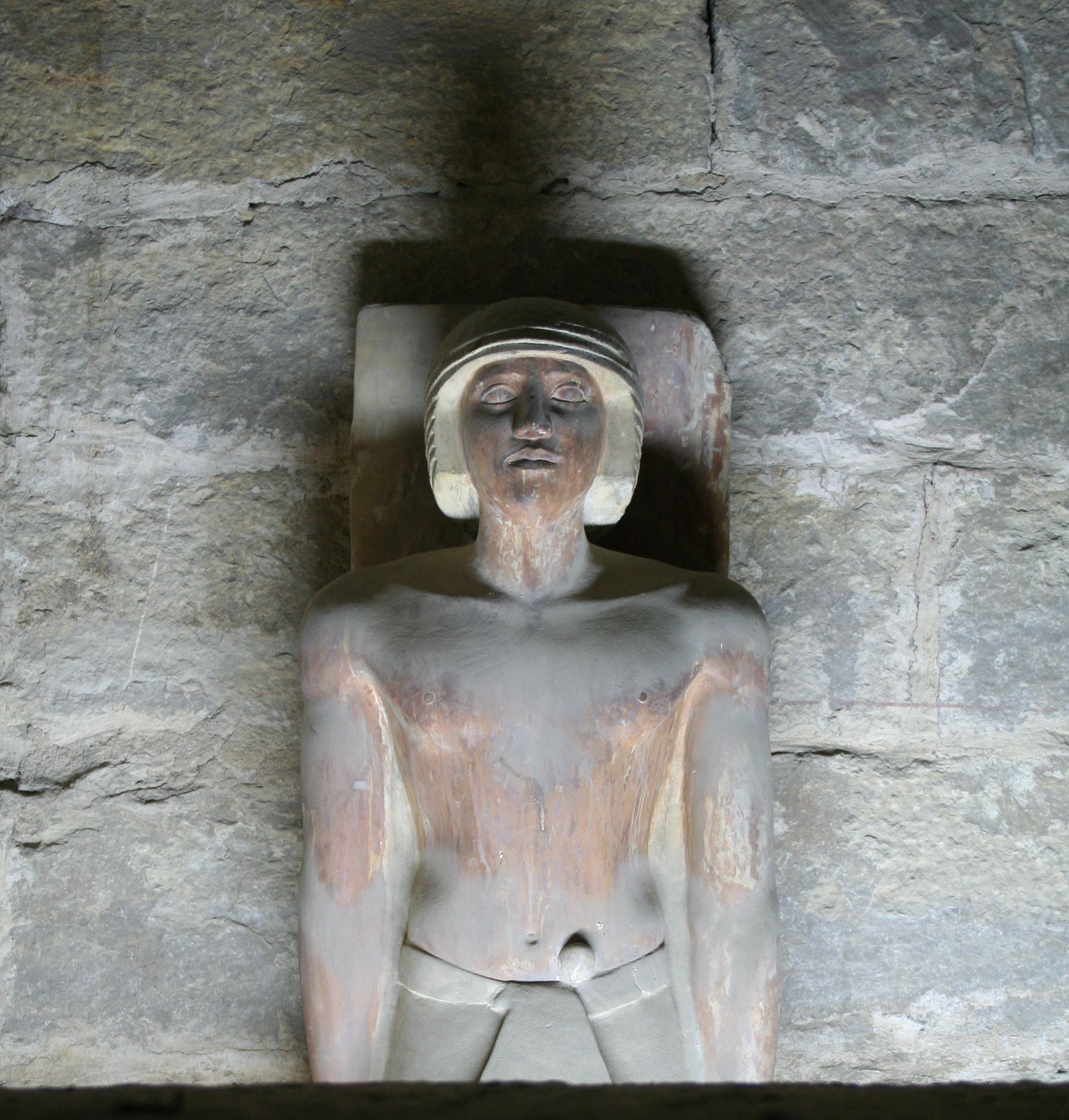
- Serdab at the Mastaba of Ti
- Interactive map of Mastaba of Ti
- 29°52′38″N 31°12′42″E
- Type: Mastaba
- Location: Badrashin, Giza, Egypt

History
- Built: c. 2400 BC

Site notes
- Discovered: 1865 by Auguste Mariette

The Mastaba of Ti is an ancient Egyptian mastaba at Saqqara, built for Ti, an official of the Fifth Dynasty. Its chapel decoration includes scenes of farming, fishing, marsh hunting and boat construction. The tomb also contains two serdabs, enclosed chambers for funerary statues.

== Ti and his career ==
Ti, also spelled Ty, was a senior official during the Fifth Dynasty. His responsibilities included supervising pyramids and sun temples at Abusir. His career and the royal names recorded in his tomb are among the evidence used to date the monument.

== Dating and construction ==
The dating of the mastaba has been debated. Johannes Auenmüller identifies two main positions in earlier scholarship: one associates the tomb with the reigns of Neferirkare and Niuserre, while the other places it later, between Niuserre's reign and the end of the Fifth Dynasty.

These differences reflect the use of several kinds of evidence, including inscriptions, architectural features and the style of the decoration. Auenmüller argues that the construction history extended from at least Neferirkare's reign to that of Niuserre, with the decoration probably completed under Niuserre. His analysis distinguishes the historical dating of the monument from its position in a sequence based on artistic style.

== Architecture and serdabs ==
The mastaba contains two serdabs. Such chambers enclosed funerary statues and could communicate with the chapel through small openings. The chapel was the area in which visitors brought offerings.

Luiza Osorio G. Silva discusses Ti's serdab as an example of the relationship between statues, visibility and funerary ritual. She notes that the chamber would originally have been almost completely dark. In her interpretation, the openings in serdabs should not be understood solely as a means for visitors to see the statues inside.

Silva connects the figures beside the opening in Ti's tomb with the presentation of offerings and incense. She interprets the opening as allowing the statue to receive their scents and thus participate in the rituals of the chapel while remaining concealed.

== Chapel decoration ==
The chapel's agricultural scenes depict work with hoes and ploughs, as well as sheep treading the soil after sowing. Fishing scenes include the use of traps and seine nets, together with the preparation and drying of fish. Other scenes show marsh hunting, cattle and boat construction.

Henri Wild documented the chapel through photographs and line drawings in the second fascicle of Le tombeau de Ti, published in 1953. The volume also includes diagrams identifying the positions of scenes and inscriptions on the walls, pillars and architrave.

== Gallery ==
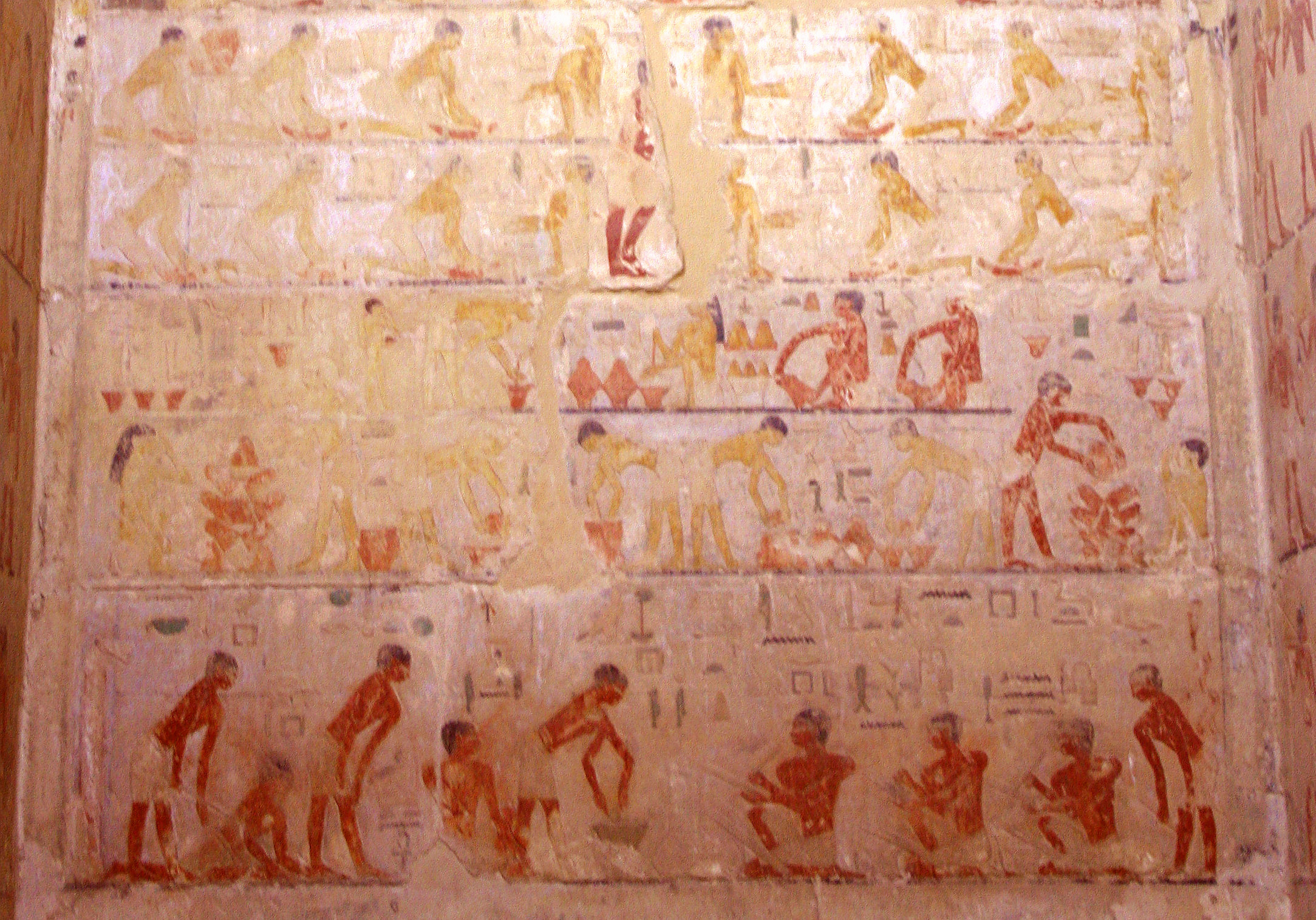
Depiction of ceramic production in the Old Kingdom

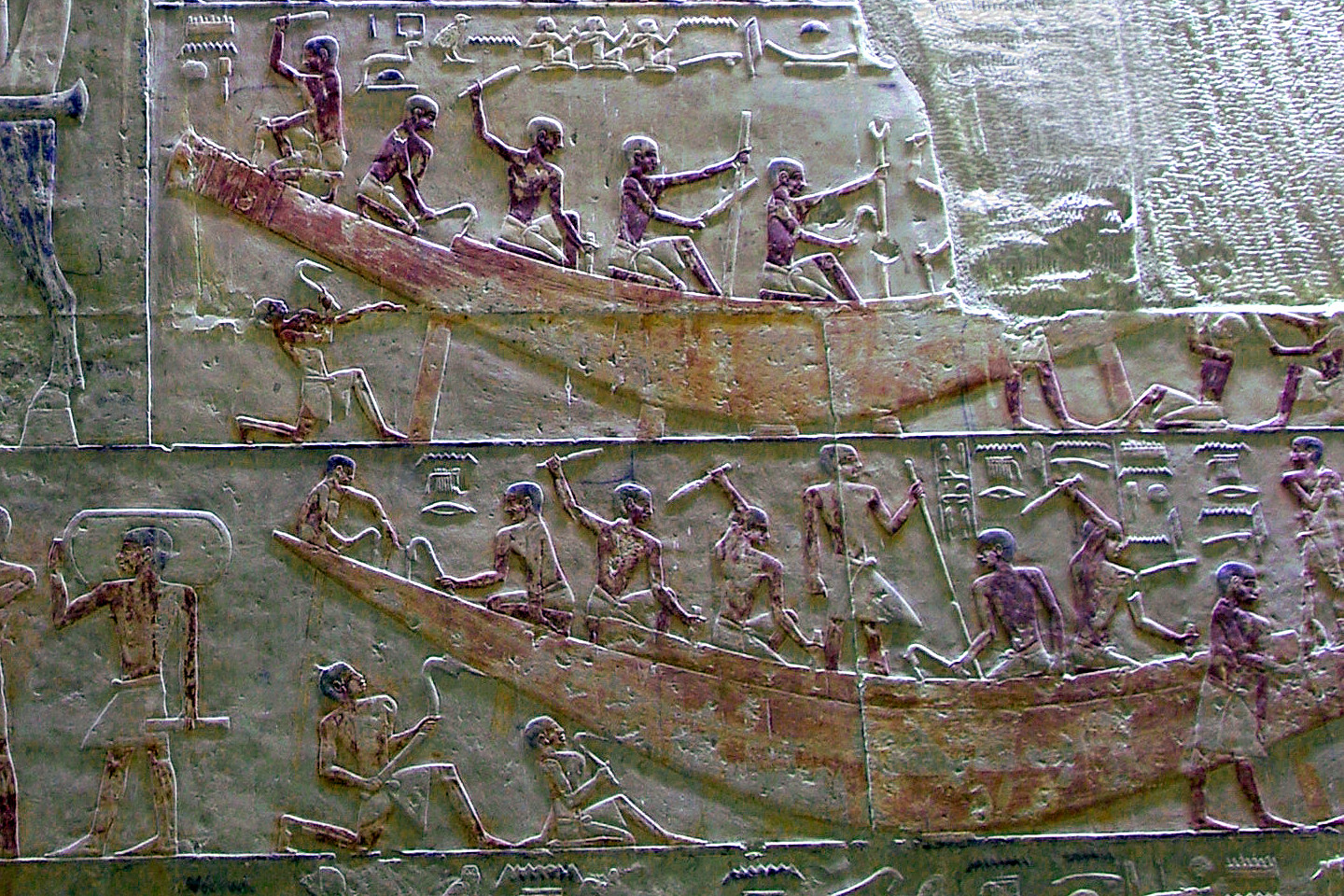
Boat building

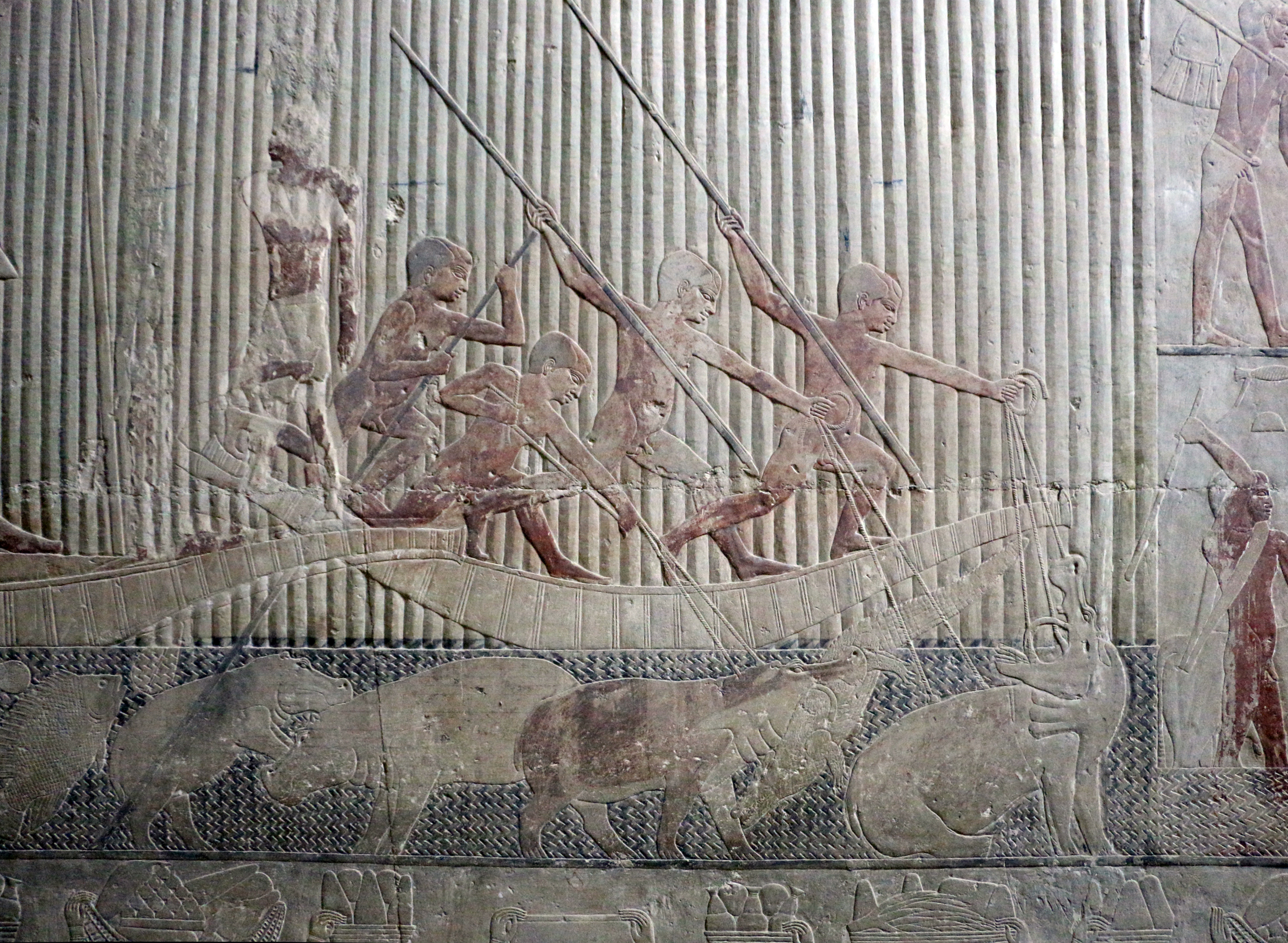
Hippopotamus hunting scene

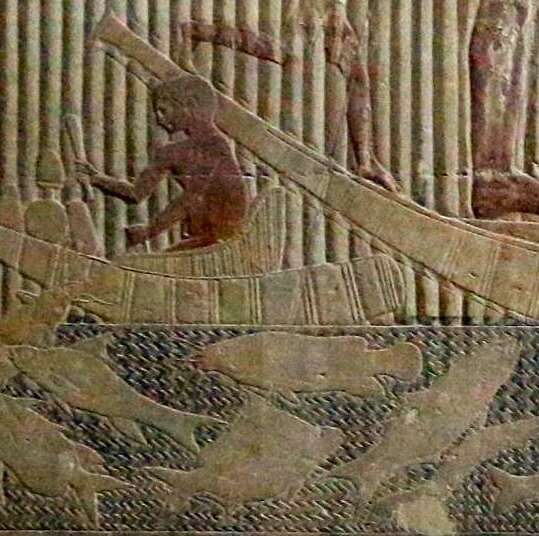
Electric catfish in a detail of the tomb's reliefs.

== Bibliography ==
- Auenmüller, Johannes (2014). "Bemerkungen zur Datierung der Mastaba des Ti in Saqqara" [Remarks on the Dating of the Mastaba of Ti at Saqqara]. Göttinger Miszellen (in German). 240: 7–18.
- Silva, Luiza Osorio G. (2024). ""That he may behold": Constructing Presence through Sight in Ancient Egyptian Art". The Art Bulletin. 106 (4): 62–87. doi:10.1080/00043079.2024.2357440.
- Wild, Henri (1953). Le tombeau de Ti. Fascicule II: La chapelle (première partie). Mémoires publiés par les membres de l'Institut français d'archéologie orientale (in French). Vol. 65. Cairo: Institut français d'archéologie orientale.
