= Paradoxoglanis =

Scientific classification
- Kingdom: Animalia
- Phylum: Chordata
- Class: Actinopterygii
- Order: Siluriformes
- Family: Malapteruridae
- Genus: Paradoxoglanis; Norris, 2002

Type species
- Paradoxoglanis caudivittatus Norris, 2002

Genus of fishes

Paradoxoglanis is a genus of electric catfishes native to Africa, with all known species being endemic to the Democratic Republic of the Congo. The species in this genus range from about 11–17 centimetres (4.3–6.7 in) SL.

== Species ==
There are currently three recognized species in this genus:

- Paradoxoglanis caudivittatus Norris, 2002
- Paradoxoglanis cryptus Norris, 2002
- Paradoxoglanis parvus Norris, 2002
