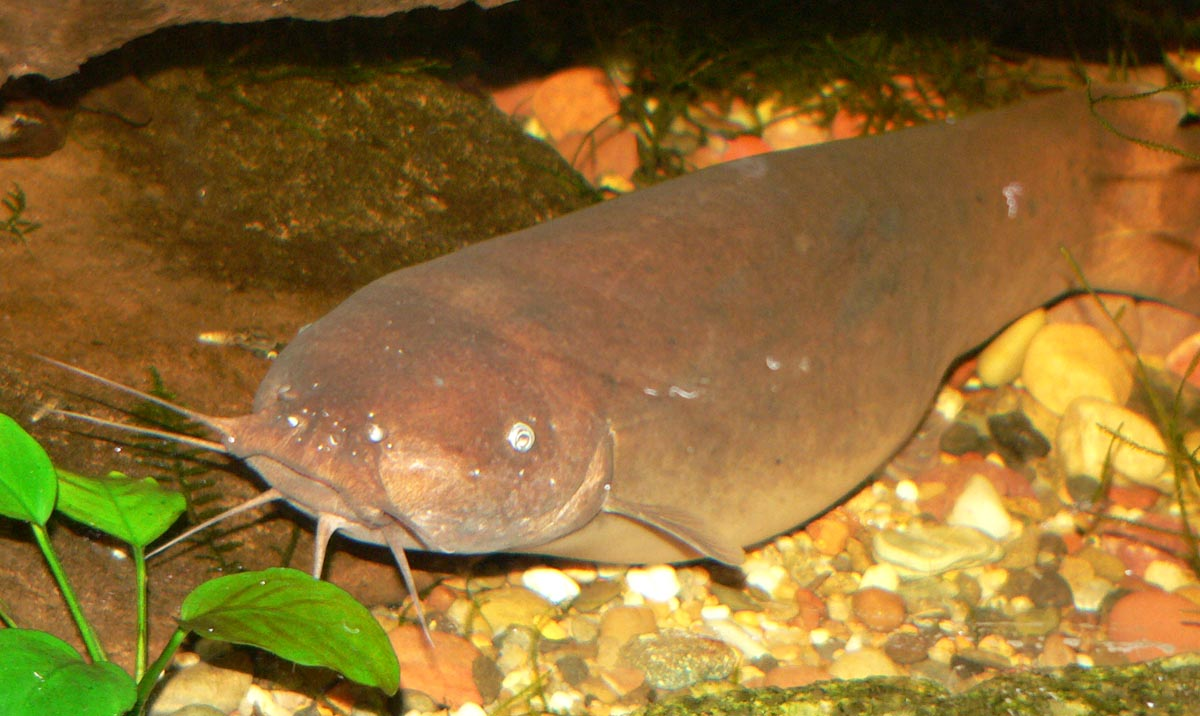

Conservation status
- Least Concern (IUCN 3.1)

Scientific classification
- Kingdom: Animalia
- Phylum: Chordata
- Class: Actinopterygii
- Division: Teleostei
- Order: Siluriformes
- Family: Malapteruridae
- Genus: Malapterurus
- Species: M. electricus

Binomial name
- Malapterurus electricus (Gmelin, 1789)

Synonyms
- Silurus electricus Gmelin, 1789

= Malapterurus electricus =

Species of fish

Malapterurus electricus is a thickset fish with six mouth barbels and a single fin on its back, just anterior to the rounded tail fin. It is brownish or grayish, irregularly spotted with black, and attains a length and weight of about 1.2 metres (3 ft 11 in) and 23 kilograms (51 lb) M. electricus is capable of generating and controlling the discharge of up to 450 volts of electricity. It uses its power to defend itself and to capture prey.

== Etymology ==
The genus name Malapterurus comes from Ancient Greek μαλακός (malakós) meaning "soft", πτερόν (pterón), meaning "wing", and οὐρά (ourá), meaning "tail". The specific epithet electricus is Latin for electric.

== Distribution ==
In Africa, it occurs in the Nile and tropical Africa and also in Lafia in the state of Nasarawa, Nigeria; and in Lake Turkana, Lake Chad and the Senegal River basin.

== Biology ==
Occurs among rock favors standing water. Active at night, feeding mainly on fish stunned by electric shocks. The electric organ, capable of discharging 300–400 V, is derived from pectoral muscle and surrounds almost the entire body. It is used both for prey capture and defense.

== Life history ==
This is an Old World catfish. It is reputed that Doctors in ancient Egypt used shocks from the Electric Catfish to reduce the pain of arthritis. This trait is still used today in some areas. It also has the earliest reference of them as hieroglyphics on the walls of ancient Egyptian tombs some 5,000 years ago.

== Economy ==
Malapterurus electricus is eaten as food in parts of Africa. Being a food fish, M. electricus is also encountered in the pet trade as an aquarium fish.

The electric organs of Malapterurus have been used in studies of neuronal metabolism, axonal transport.

== Reproduction ==
In their natural habitat they form pairs and lay their eggs in excavated cavities or holes. The male takes the eggs into his mouth. There have been rumours that they are mouth brooders. It is also unknown how the fry are immune to the electric shocks by the parents.

== In the aquarium ==
Malapterurus electricus is sometimes encountered in aquarium supply stores. It can reach a maximum length of over 1 metre (3 ft 3 in) in the wild, but has an average size of 12 inches (30 cm) in the aquarium. It is quite hardy and greedily accepts most foods, although some experimentation may be required to find the best food. The only other animals that are compatible with this species are snails, which they will ignore. A minimum aquarium size of 55 US gallons (210 L; 46 imp gal) is required, with bogwood or pieces of PVC pipe. They are active burrowers and will often remove the gravel from under their favorite hiding spot. A minimum temperature of 75 °F (24 °C) is necessary. It is illegal to possess any species of electric catfish for personal or commercial use in Florida.
