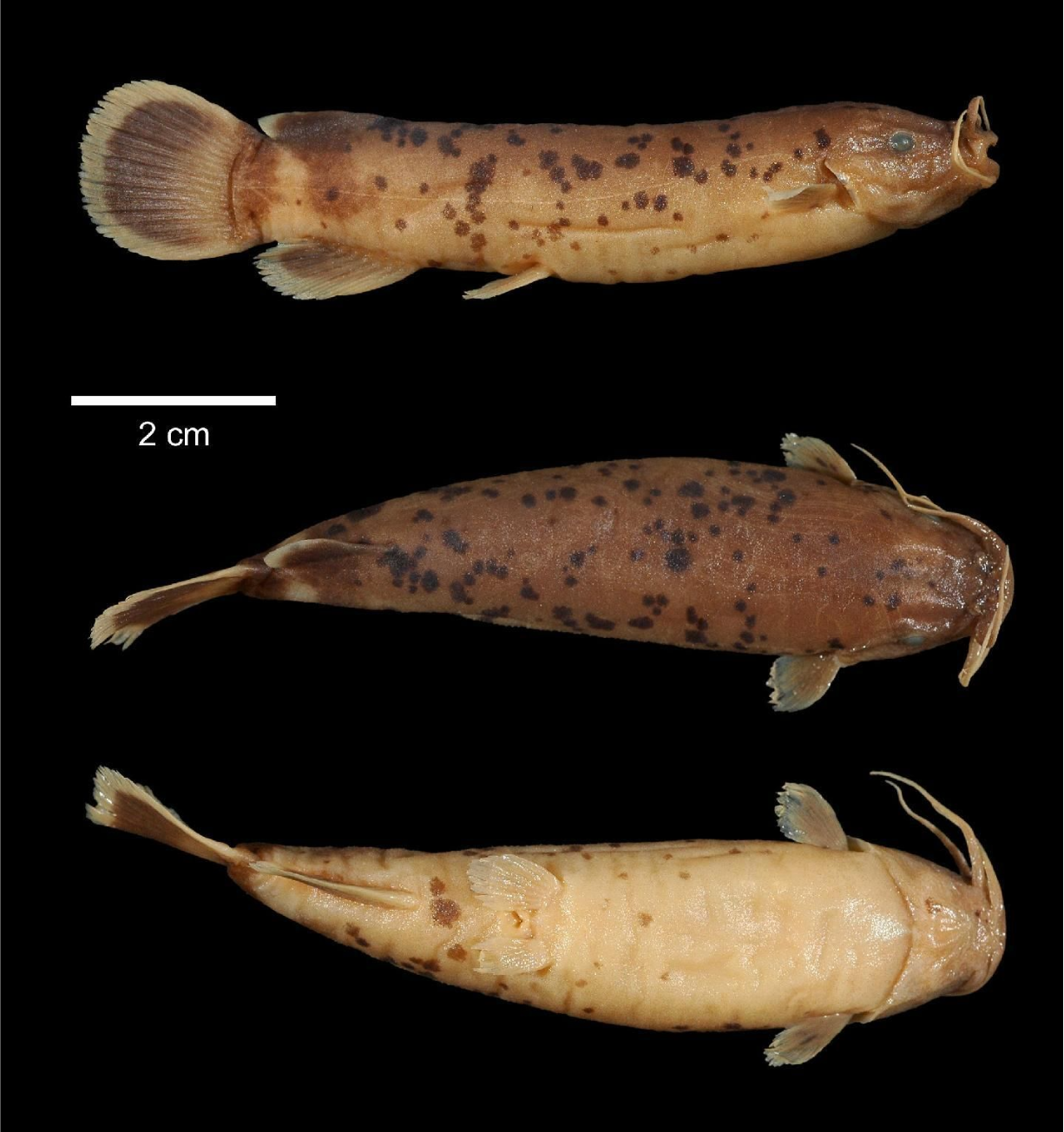
- The holotype

Conservation status
- Data Deficient (IUCN 3.1)

Scientific classification
- Kingdom: Animalia
- Phylum: Chordata
- Class: Actinopterygii
- Order: Siluriformes
- Family: Malapteruridae
- Genus: Malapterurus
- Species: M. leonensis

Binomial name
- Malapterurus leonensis Roberts, 2000

= Malapterurus leonensis =

Species of fish

Malapterurus leonensis is a species of electric catfish endemic to Sierra Leone, where it is found in the coastal rivers. This species grows to a length of 15.5 centimetres (6.1 in) SL.

== Threats ==
The Florida Fish and Wildlife Conservation Commission has listed the electric catfish as a prohibited species. Prohibited nonnative species, as they are considered to be dangerous to the ecology and/or health and welfare of the people in Florida. Currently, no indication of M. leonensis in the United States in the wild or in trade was found.
