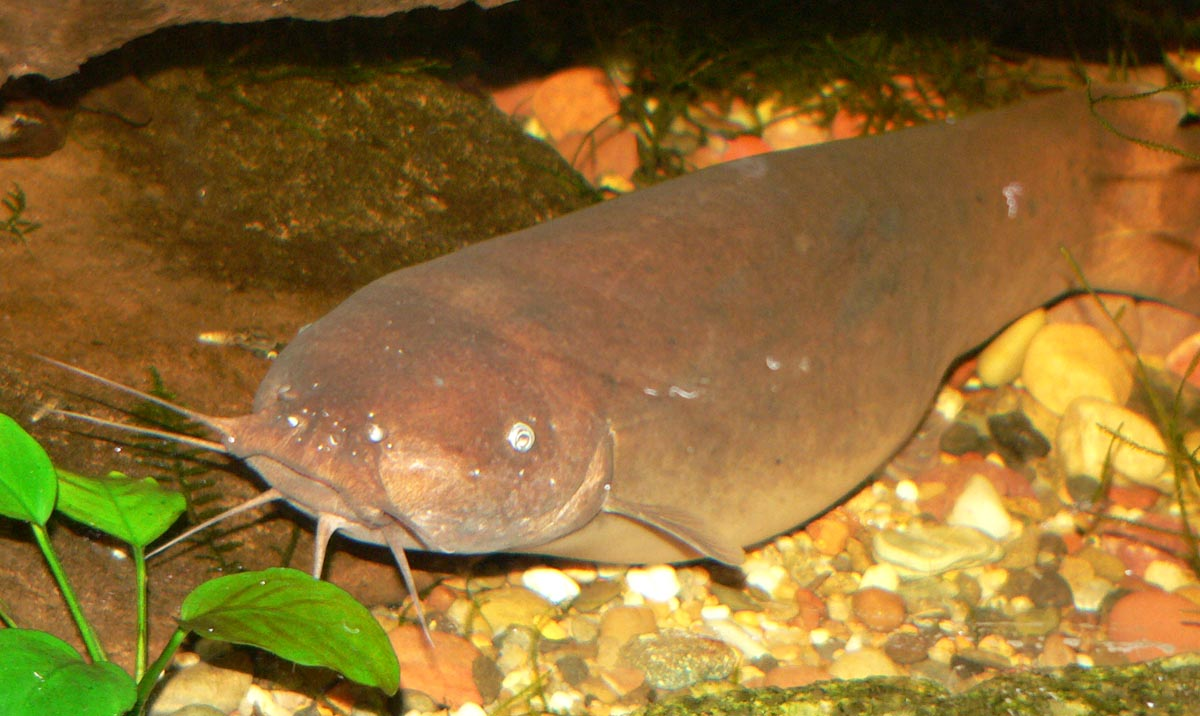
- Malapterurus electricus

Scientific classification
- Kingdom: Animalia
- Phylum: Chordata
- Class: Actinopterygii
- Order: Siluriformes
- Family: Malapteruridae
- Genus: Malapterurus; Lacépède, 1803

Type species
- Silurus electricus Gmelin, 1789

Species
- See text.

Synonyms
- Anacanthus Minding 1832; Malopterurus Agassiz, 1846

= Malapterurus =

Genus of fishes

Malapterurus (from Ancient Greek μαλακός (malakós) meaning "soft", πτερόν (pterón), meaning "wing", and οὐρά (ourá), meaning "tail") is a genus of catfishes (order Siluriformes) of the electric catfish family (Malapteruridae). It includes 18 species.

== Distribution ==
The genus Malapterurus is found throughout western and central tropical Africa and the Nile River. They occur in all major freshwater systems including the Buzi, Niger, Ogooué, Omo, Sanaga, Sabi-Lundi, Senegal, Shari, Congo, and Zambezi River basins, as well as Lakes Albert, Chad, Kainji, Tanganyika, and Turkana. The genus (and indeed the whole family) is on the Prohibited Nonnative Species List of the Florida Fish and Wildlife Conservation Commission and, while there does not appear to be firm evidence of any establishment as an invasive species in Florida, the genus may occur in Hong Kong now as well even if not yet reported as an invasive species there.

== Description ==
Malapterurus have an elongate and cylindrical body that gives them the general appearance of a sausage. The eyes are small, the lips are rather thick, and the snout is rounded with widely separated nostrils. The gill openings are narrow and restricted to the sides. Malapterurus species have three pairs of barbels, and lack a dorsal fin. The pectoral, pelvic, and caudal fins are rounded. The swimbladder has two elongate posterior chambers.

Species in Malapterurus are generally grayish-brown on the back and sides, fading to an off white or cream color on the ventral surfaces of the head and body. There are irregular black spots or blotches randomly distributed on the sides of the body. The posterior half of the caudal peduncle usually has a dark brown or black vertical bar and a cream vertical bar immediately before it. The edges of the anal and caudal fins have a cream margin, and the base of the caudal fin has a cream region and a dark brown crescent-shaped band immediately after it.

The electrogenic organ is derived from anterior body musculature and lines the body cavity. A fish that is 50 centimetres (19 in) in length can discharge up to 350 V.

M. electricus is one of the few electric species that have been conditioned by means of reward to discharge on signal. As reported in the New York Times on April 2, 1967, researcher Dr. Frank J. Mandriota of City College of New York conditioned a M. electricus to discharge on a light signal for a reward of live worms delivered automatically. This is a first in conditioning that modified neither glandular nor muscular responses.

M. electricus can grow as large as 122 centimetres (48 in) TL and 20 kilograms (44 pounds).

== Ecology ==
Malapterurus species are generally found among rocks or roots in turbid or black waters with low visibility. They favor sluggish or standing water.

M. electricus is a voracious piscivore. It uses its electrical discharges to stun prey. It is an opportunistic feeder and will feed on any readily available prey in the habitat. These fish are slow-moving, deliberate feeders with infrequent, heavy meals.

Breeding pairs of M. electricus nest in holes about 3 metres (10 ft) in length excavated in clay banks in water 1–3 m (3.3–9.8 ft) deep.

== Relationship to humans ==
The electrical discharge of M. electricus is not known to be fatal to humans.

M. electricus is eaten as food in certain parts of Africa. Along the shores of Lake Kainji, smoked electric catfish is a popular delicacy. M. electricus is also sometimes encountered as an aquarium fish.

== Species ==
There are currently 18 recognized species in this genus:

- Malapterurus barbatus Norris, 2002
- Malapterurus beninensis Murray, 1855
- Malapterurus cavalliensis Roberts, 2000
- Malapterurus electricus (Gmelin, 1789) (electric catfish)
- Malapterurus leonensis Roberts, 2000
- Malapterurus melanochir Norris, 2002
- Malapterurus microstoma Poll & Gosse, 1969 (smallmouth electric catfish)
- Malapterurus minjiriya Sagua, 1987
- Malapterurus monsembeensis Roberts, 2000
- Malapterurus occidentalis Norris, 2002
- Malapterurus oguensis Sauvage, 1879
- Malapterurus punctatus Norris, 2002
- Malapterurus shirensis Roberts, 2000
- Malapterurus stiassnyae Norris, 2002
- Malapterurus tanganyikaensis Roberts, 2000
- Malapterurus tanoensis Roberts, 2000
- Malapterurus teugelsi Norris, 2002
- Malapterurus thysi Norris, 2002
