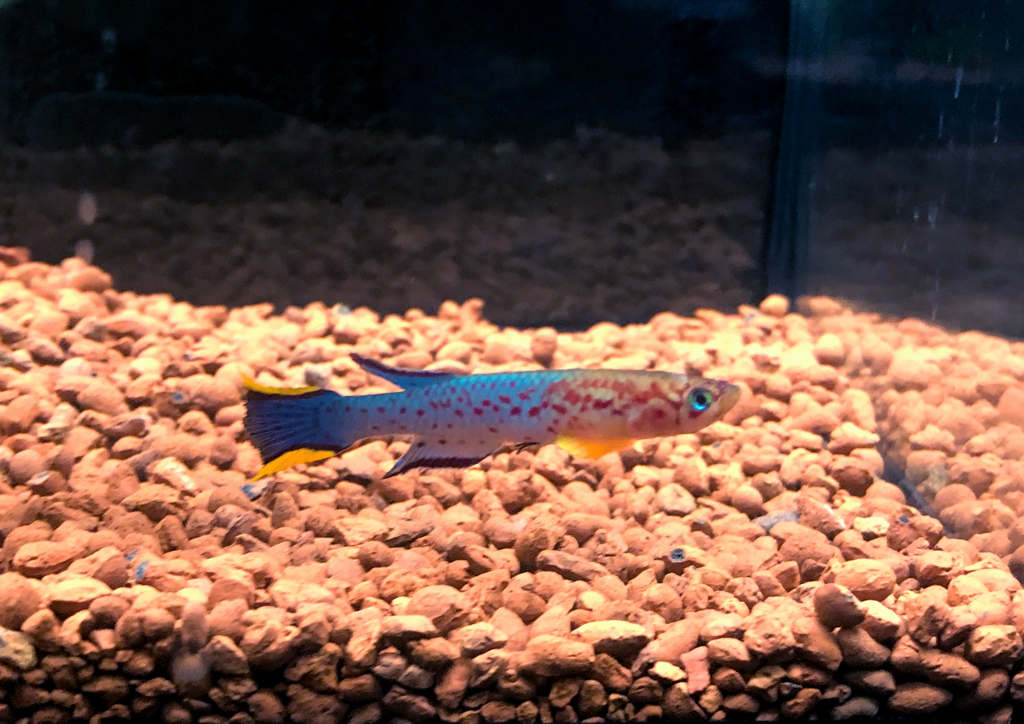
- A male Scriptaphyosemion schmitti

Scientific classification
- Kingdom: Animalia
- Phylum: Chordata
- Class: Actinopterygii
- Order: Cyprinodontiformes
- Family: Nothobranchiidae
- Genus: Scriptaphyosemion; Radda & Pürzl, 1987

Type species
- Aphyosemion guineense geryi J. G. Lambert, 1958

= Scriptaphyosemion =

Genus of fishes

Scriptaphyosemion is a genus of killifish from the family Nothobranchiidae which is endemic to Africa.

== Species ==
There are currently 13 recognized species in this genus:

- Scriptaphyosemion banforense (Seegers, 1982)
- Scriptaphyosemion bertholdi (Roloff, 1965) (Berthold's killi)
- Scriptaphyosemion brueningi (Roloff, 1971) (Bruening's killi)
- Scriptaphyosemion cauveti (Romand & Ozouf-Costaz, 1995) (Kindia killi)
- Scriptaphyosemion chaytori (Roloff, 1971)
- Scriptaphyosemion etzeli (Berkenkamp, 1979)
- Scriptaphyosemion fredrodi (Vandersmisson, Etzel & Berkenkamp, 1980)
- Scriptaphyosemion geryi (J. G. Lambert, 1958) (Gérys killi)
- Scriptaphyosemion guignardi (Romand, 1981)
- Scriptaphyosemion liberiense (Boulenger, 1908)
- Scriptaphyosemion roloffi (Roloff, 1936)
- Scriptaphyosemion schmitti (Romand, 1979)
- Scriptaphyosemion wieseae Sonnenberg & Busch, 2012
