= Synodontis waterloti =

Conservation status
- Least Concern (IUCN 3.1)

Scientific classification
- Domain: Eukaryota
- Kingdom: Animalia
- Phylum: Chordata
- Class: Actinopterygii
- Order: Siluriformes
- Family: Mochokidae
- Genus: Synodontis
- Species: S. waterloti

Binomial name
- Synodontis waterloti Daget, 1962

Species of fish

Synodontis waterloti is a species of upside-down catfish native to waters of western Africa. This species grows to a length of 18.5 centimetres (7.3 in) TL. This species is a minor component of local commercial fisheries.
