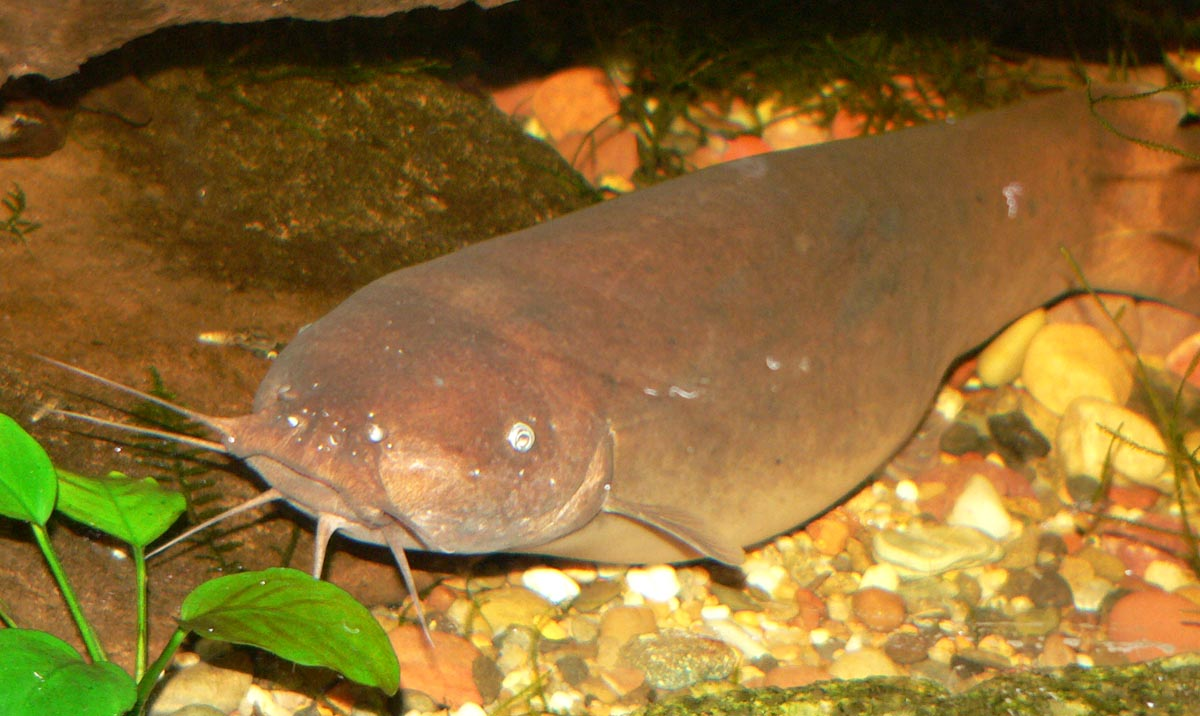
- Malapterurus electricus

Scientific classification
- Kingdom: Animalia
- Phylum: Chordata
- Class: Actinopterygii
- Order: Siluriformes
- Superfamily: Siluroidea
- Family: Malapteruridae; Bleeker, 1858

Genera
- Malapterurus; Paradoxoglanis

= Electric catfish =

Family of fishes

Electric catfish, or Malapteruridae (from Ancient Greek μαλακός (malakós) meaning "soft", πτερόν (pterón), meaning "wing", and οὐρά (ourá), meaning "tail"), is a family of catfishes (order Siluriformes). This family includes two genera, Malapterurus and Paradoxoglanis, with 21 species. Several species of this family have the ability to generate electricity, delivering a shock of up to 350 volts from its electric organ. Electric catfish are found in tropical Africa and the Nile River. Electric catfish are usually nocturnal and carnivorous. Some species feed primarily on other fish, incapacitating their prey with electric discharges, but others are generalist bottom foragers, feeding on things like invertebrates, fish eggs, and detritus. The largest can grow to about 1.2 meters (4 ft) long, but most species are far smaller.

== Description ==
Section of an electric catfish, showing the electric organ

The Malapteruridae are the only group of catfish with well-developed electrogenic organs; however, electroreceptive systems are widespread in catfishes. The electrogenic organ is derived from anterior body musculature and lines the body cavity. Electric catfish do not have dorsal fins or fin spines. They have three pairs of barbels (the nasal pair is absent). The swim bladder has elongate posterior chambers, two chambers in Malapterurus and three in Paradoxoglanis.

Malapterurus have been conditioned by means of reward to discharge on signal. As reported in the New York Times, April 2, 1967, a researcher, Dr. Frank J. Mandriota of City College, New York, conditioned an M. electricus to discharge on a light signal for a reward of live worms delivered automatically. This is the first conditioning that modified neither glandular nor muscular responses.

The largest can grow to about 1.2 meters (3 ft) and 20 kg (44 lb). Most Malapterurus and all Paradoxoglanis species are much smaller, reaching less than 30 cm (1 ft) long.

== Relationship to humans ==
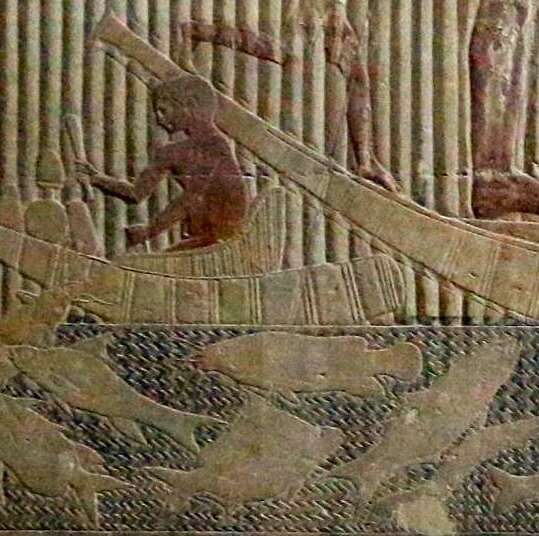
Electric catfish (centre) in Mastaba of Ti bas-relief, Saqqara, ancient Egypt

The electric catfish of the Nile was well known to the ancient Egyptians. The Egyptians reputedly used the electric shock from them when treating arthritis pain. They would use only smaller fish, as a large fish may generate a dangerous electric shock from 300 to 400 volts. The Egyptians depicted the fish in their mural paintings and elsewhere; the first known depiction of an electric catfish is on a slate palette of the predynastic Egyptian ruler Narmer about 3100 BC.

An account of its electric properties was given by an Arab physician Abd al-Latif al-Baghdadi of the 12th century; then as now, the fish was known by the suggestive name of الرعد el raad, which means "thunder".

The shock of these catfish is used to stun prey and in defense. It is not known to be fatal to humans, but large electric catfish can stun an adult person. In small electric catfish, the generated current is far less and only feels like a tingle to humans.
