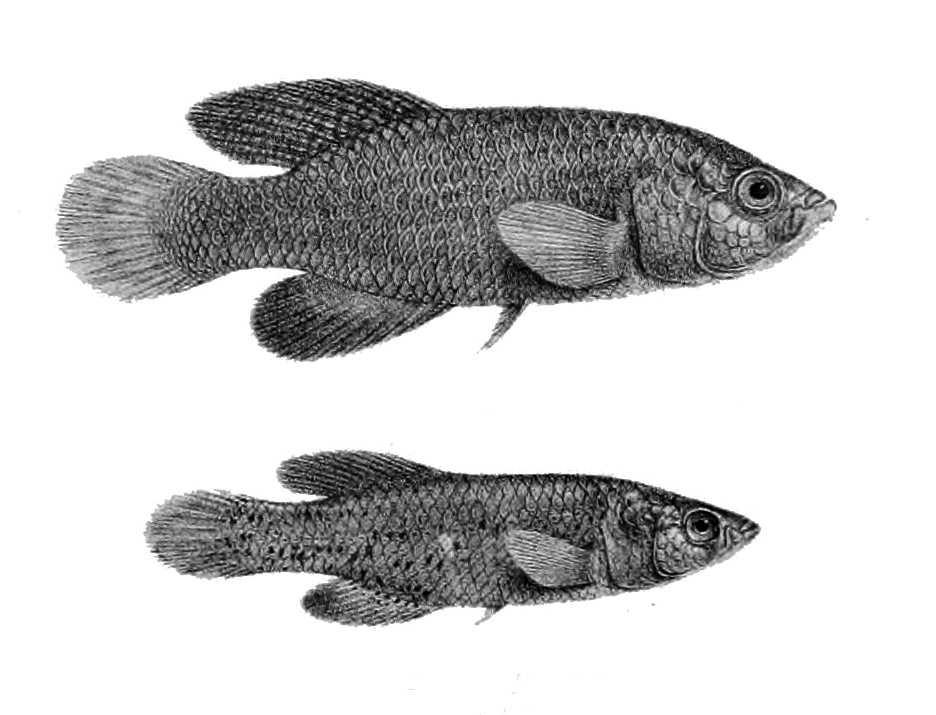

Conservation status
- Least Concern (IUCN 3.1)

Scientific classification
- Kingdom: Animalia
- Phylum: Chordata
- Class: Actinopterygii
- Order: Cyprinodontiformes
- Family: Nothobranchiidae
- Genus: Nothobranchius
- Species: N. orthonotus

Binomial name
- Nothobranchius orthonotus (Peters, 1844)

Synonyms
- Cyprinodon orthonotus Peters, 1844; Fundulus orthonotus (Peters, 1844); Hydrargyra maculata Peters, 1855; Nothobranchius maculatus (Peters, 1855); Adiniops troemneri Myers, 1926; Nothobranchius troemneri (Myers, 1926); Nothobranchius mayeri Ahl, 1935

= Spotted killifish =

Species of fish

The spotted killifish (Nothobranchius orthonotus) is a small, short lived species of fish, an African rivuline from the family Nothobranchiidae. These fish are native to many isolated freshwater pools located in the savannah depressions of east Africa, specifically Malawi, Mozambique, Zimbabwe, and South Africa. This species of fish occurs in ephemeral waters and killifish eggs can survive long periods of dehydration. The word killifish likely comes from the Dutch kil for kill (small stream).

== Diet ==
The spotted killifish consumes both aquatic invertebrates and vertebrates, its diet consists mainly of juvenile lungfish (Protopterus annectens) and larval amphibia. In addition to these, this species also consumes a relatively high proportion of insect larvae from the orders Odonata, Coleoptera and Ephemeroptera. Diets such as these may be deemed as profitable for the trade-offs in item size and ease of catching.

== Life cycle and reproduction ==
The spotted killifish, typically of the genus Nothobranchius, are adapted to annual desiccation of their habitat. The fishes hatch at the start of each rainy season, and continue to grow very quickly. Within a matter of a few weeks, these fish reach sexual maturity, and reproduce daily, with females laying up to 50 eggs each day. From here, the eggs are spawned into a layer of rock or soil beneath the surface of the ground, and remain there after the pool has dried up. Even with a dry environment, the embryos are able to exist in developmental suspension until the starts of the next wet season.

== Characteristics ==
Fish with the genus Nothobranchius show a striking level of sexual dichomatism, where the males portray bright colors, and the females are dull. The adult spotted killifish is one of the largest of its genus, and can grow up to 10 centimetres (3.9 in) in length.

== Habitat and ecology ==
The spotted killifish is native to isolated freshwater pools located in the savannah depressions of east Africa, specifically Malawi, Mozambique, Zimbabwe, and South Africa. This species was found to share these pools with N. furzeri, N. kadleci and N.rachovii, all congeners. The natural environments inhabited can range from non-vegetated and shallow with cloudy water, all the way to densely overgrown pools, that are fairly deep and have clear water. This species may also be present in swamps intermittently connected to floodplains. Given the lifecycle of the spotted killifish, it has adapted to varying dry and wet weather conditions that persist in this part of the world. However, due to recent anti-malarial and tsetse fly spraying programs, the populations of spotted killifish are becoming threatened. Though this species is threatened, it is at lower risk, and not yet in need of acts of conservation given that the threats are localized.

== Naming ==
The spotted killifish was originally described in 1844 as Cyprinodon orthonotus by Wilhelm Peters with the type locality given as Quelimane in eastern Mozambique. The specific name is derived from orthos meaning "straight" and notus meaning back, referring to the straight dorsal profile of this species.

== See also ==
- Killifish
- Banded killifish
