= Nothobranchius kirki =

Conservation status
- Vulnerable (IUCN 3.1)

Scientific classification
- Kingdom: Animalia
- Phylum: Chordata
- Class: Actinopterygii
- Order: Cyprinodontiformes
- Family: Nothobranchiidae
- Genus: Nothobranchius
- Species: N. kirki

Binomial name
- Nothobranchius kirki R. A. Jubb, 1969

Species of fish

Nothobranchius kirki, the redfin notho, is a species of killifish from the family Nothobranchiidae which is endemic to Malawi where it occurs in the drainages of Lake Malawi and Lake Chilwa. It inhabits swamps and ephemeral pools. This species can reach a length of 5 centimetres (2.0 in) TL. It can also be found in the aquarium trade. This species was described in 1969 by the South African ichthyologist Rex Jubb from types collected by R. G. Kirk, who was a fish biologist of the Agricultural Research Services part of the Ministry of Natural Resources of Malawi, from a pool adjacent to the Likangala River which forms part of the endorheic basin of Lake Chilwa in Malawi.
