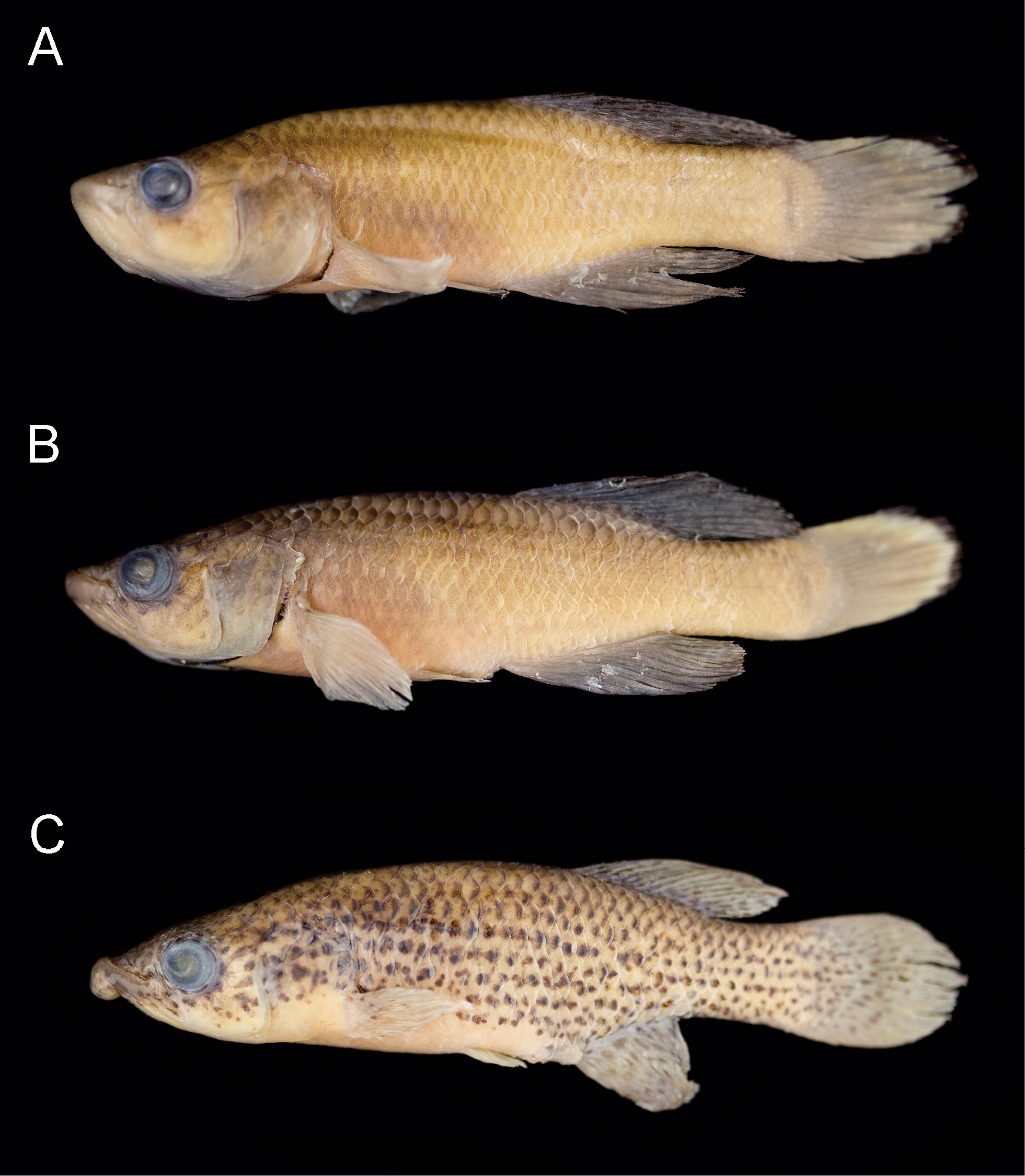

Scientific classification
- Kingdom: Animalia
- Phylum: Chordata
- Class: Actinopterygii
- Order: Cyprinodontiformes
- Family: Nothobranchiidae
- Genus: Nothobranchius
- Species: N. lucius

Binomial name
- Nothobranchius lucius Wildekamp, Shidlovskiy & Watters, 2009

= Nothobranchius lucius =

Species of fish

Nothobranchius lucius is a species of killifish, an African rivuline which is placed in the family Nothobranchiidae. It is endemic to Tanzania.

== Description ==
Nothobranchius lucius is a relatively large species of killifish and can be distinguished from the closely related N. melanospilus and N. makondorum, by its comparatively longer head, with a longer snout apparent in both males and females with the males having a thinner body. The snout is pointed with a subterminal mouth which faces slightly upwards. The dorsal profile is slightly concave on head and also concave from the nape to the posterior end of the dorsal fin; the caudal peduncle has a straight profile both dorsally and ventrally. Compared to many species in the genus Nothobranchius, N. lucius is rather dull in colour although an identifying mark is the presence of an orange line before the black margin of the caudal fin.

== Distribution ==
Nothobranchius lucius is found in a small area in southern central Tanzania, between Ifakara and the Kilombero river ferry. It appears to be replaced by the similar N. melanospilus to the east and by N. makondorum to the south of its range.

== Habitat and biology ==
Nothobranchius lucius is found in seasonal pools and marshes where it reproduces in the wet season and the eggs enter diapause to hatch the following season. It is a predatory species and swallows smaller fishes whole.

== Naming ==
Nothobranchius lucius was described in 2009 by Rudolf Hans Wildekamp, Konstantin Mikhailovich Shidlovskiy and Brian R. Watters with the type locality given as being a large pool on west side of road between Ifakara and the Kilombero River ferry, two kilometres south of Ifakara and one kilometre north of Kilombero River. The specific name lucius is Latin for a pike, a reference to this species strong teeth, predatory habits and somewhat pike-like appearance.

== Uses ==
This species is known in the aquarium trade where it is often known as the pike nothobranch and was called N. sp aff melanospilis before its formal description in 2009.
