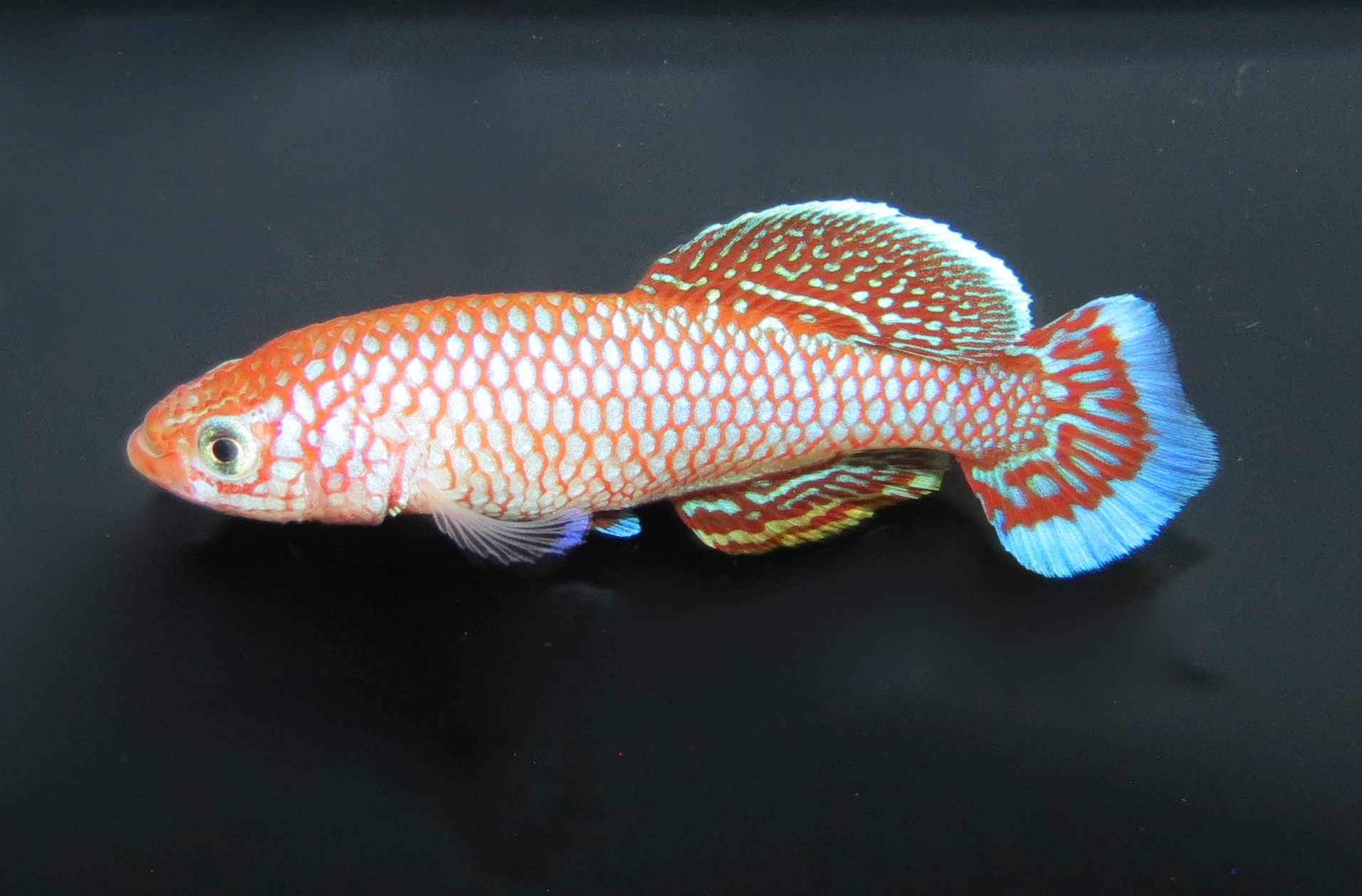

Conservation status
- Endangered (IUCN 3.1)

Scientific classification
- Kingdom: Animalia
- Phylum: Chordata
- Class: Actinopterygii
- Order: Cyprinodontiformes
- Family: Nothobranchiidae
- Genus: Nothobranchius
- Species: N. polli

Binomial name
- Nothobranchius polli Wildekamp, 1978

= Nothobranchius polli =

Species of fish

Nothobranchius polli is a species of freshwater fish in the Nothobranchiidae family of order Cyprinodontiformes. It occurs in a limited range in the Lufira River drainage of the Democratic Republic of the Congo. An endangered species, it inhabits temporary pools and swamps and reaches a total length of 6 cm (2.4 in).

== Taxonomy and etymology ==
Nothobranchius polli was first described by Rudolph Hans Wildekamp in 1978; N. polli specimens had previously been misidentified as members of the species N. brieni and N. taeniopygus. It is classified in the family Nothobranchiidae (the African rivulines) in the order Cyprinodontiformes. The species holotype was collected from near Mwadingusha in the Democratic Republic of the Congo and is preserved at the Royal Museum for Central Africa. The specific name, polli, honors Max Fernand Leon Poll. The species is one of 97 members of the genus Nothobranchius, all of which are found in Africa.

== Distribution and habitat ==
Nothobranchius polli is endemic to southeastern Democratic Republic of the Congo. It is found in temporary pools, swamps, and ditches in the upper Lufira River drainage. It is known from only three to five locations, with an extent of occurrence of 619 km^{2} (239 mi^{2}) and an area of occupancy of 12 km^{2} (4.6 mi^{2}). It prefers cloudy water with temperatures of 23–28 °C (73–82 °F) and a pH of 6.3–7.2.

== Description ==
Males are iridescent light blue; the scales have red margins. The dorsal fin is light blue with red stripes; at the outer edge of the fin is a light blue or white band. The caudal fin is marbled red and light blue ending in a thin reddish-brown band, a light blue band, and a thin black band. The anal fin is light blue with red stripes and some yellow areas. The snout, throat, and top of the head are red. The fish reaches a maximum total length of 6 cm (2.4 in).

== Biology and ecology ==
Nothobranchius polli spawns at the bottom of the water column; eggs are laid in clayey mud and develop during the dry season before hatching during the following rainy season.

== Conservation ==
Nothobranchius polli is assessed as an endangered species on the IUCN Red List. It has a very limited range and its population size has been observed to be declining. Its fragmented habitat is threatened by agriculture, mining, dam construction, and the fishing industry. A 2010 study found very high levels of pollutants in the water and the bodies of the fish specimens, and most specimens taken in 2013 and 2016 were very sick with fungal infections. The species is occasionally used by aquarium hobbyists.
