= Nothobranchius cooperi =

Conservation status
- Vulnerable (IUCN 3.1)

Scientific classification
- Kingdom: Animalia
- Phylum: Chordata
- Class: Actinopterygii
- Order: Cyprinodontiformes
- Family: Nothobranchiidae
- Genus: Nothobranchius
- Species: N. cooperi

Binomial name
- Nothobranchius cooperi Nagy, Watters & Bellstedt, 2017

Species of fish

Nothobranchius cooperi is a species of brightly colored seasonal killifish in the family Nothobranchiidae. This species is endemic to seasonal freshwater habitats in northern Zambia. It is known from temporary pools and swamps on the floodplains of the Mansa and Lufimba river systems in Zambia.

== Etymology ==
The fish is named in honor of Barry J. Cooper.

== Links ==
- Nothobranchius cooperi on WildNothos - various information and photographs of this species
