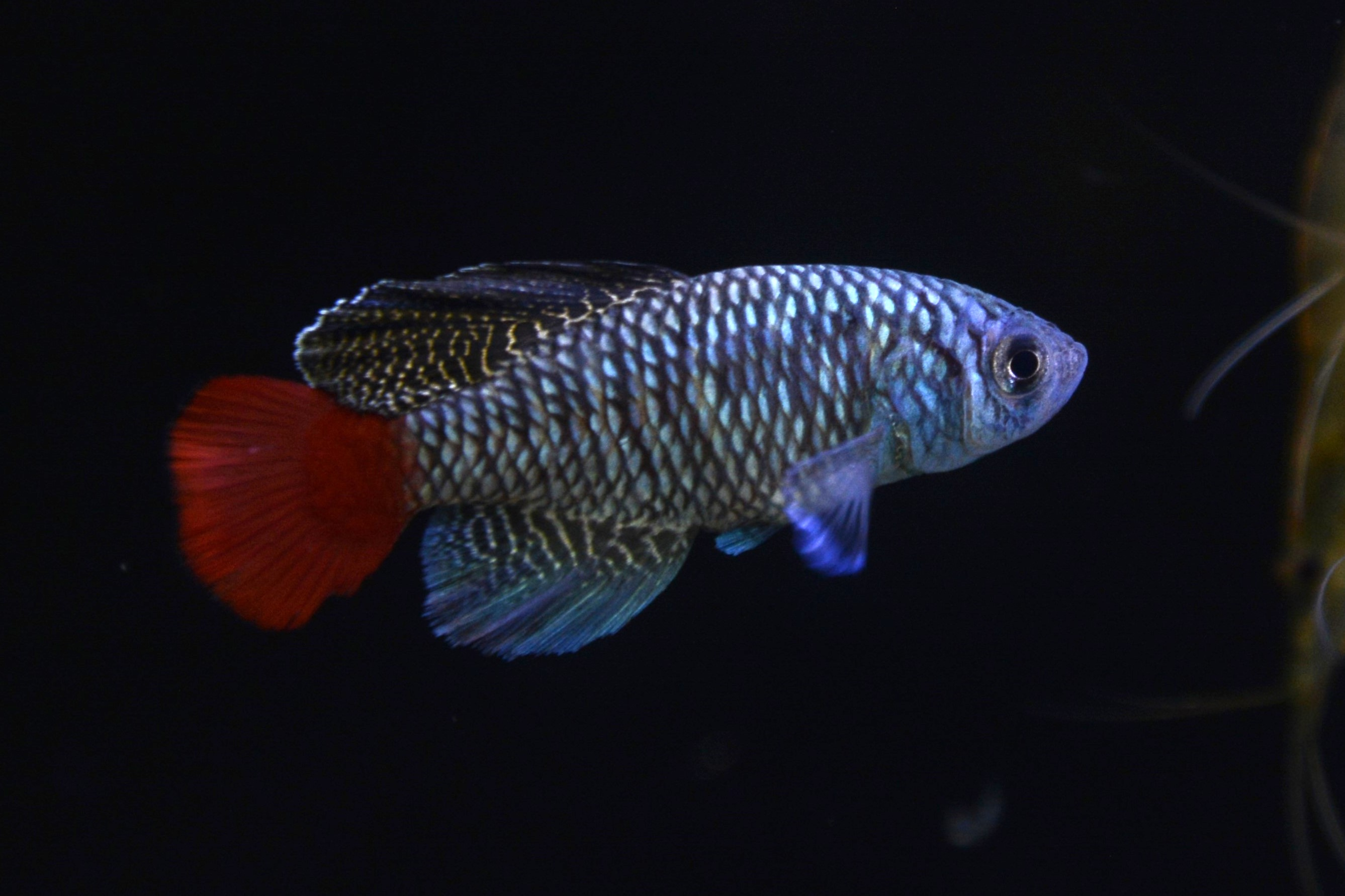

Conservation status
- Least Concern (IUCN 3.1)

Scientific classification
- Kingdom: Animalia
- Phylum: Chordata
- Class: Actinopterygii
- Order: Cyprinodontiformes
- Family: Nothobranchiidae
- Genus: Nothobranchius
- Species: N. patrizii

Binomial name
- Nothobranchius patrizii (Vinciguerra, 1927)

Synonyms
- Fundulus patrizii Vinciguerra, 1927

= Blue notho =

Species of fish

The blue notho, or Patrizi's notho (Nothobranchius patrizii) is a species of killifish in the family Nothobranchiidae. It is found in Kenya and Somalia. Its natural habitat is running water. The males are usually around 5.0 centimetres (2.0 in). In the aquarium the females lay their eggs on bottom peat. This species was described as Fundulus patrizii by Decio Vinciguerra in 1927 with a type locality of the Harenaga swamps, near mouth of the Juba River in southern Somalia. Vinciguerra gave this fish the specific name of patrizii in honour of the collector of the type Saverio Patrizi Naro Montoro (1902-1957), an Italian explorer, zoologist and speleologist.
