= Nothobranchius janpapi =

Conservation status
- Least Concern (IUCN 3.1)

Scientific classification
- Kingdom: Animalia
- Phylum: Chordata
- Class: Actinopterygii
- Order: Cyprinodontiformes
- Family: Nothobranchiidae
- Genus: Nothobranchius
- Species: N. janpapi

Binomial name
- Nothobranchius janpapi Wildekamp, 1977

Species of fish

Nothobranchius janpapi is a species of killifish in the family Nothobranchiidae. It is endemic to the Ruvu and Rufiji rivers in eastern Tanzania. Its natural habitats are small pools and ponds situated on floodplains. The specific name honours the Dutch aquarist Jan Pap, who first discovered this species in 1975 and sent examples back to the Netherlands.

== Links ==
- Nothobranchius janpapi on WildNothos
- Nothobranchius janpapi on Nothobranchius Maintenance Group (N.M.G.)
