= Nothobranchius neumanni =

Conservation status
- Least Concern (IUCN 3.1)

Scientific classification
- Kingdom: Animalia
- Phylum: Chordata
- Class: Actinopterygii
- Order: Cyprinodontiformes
- Family: Nothobranchiidae
- Genus: Nothobranchius
- Species: N. neumanni

Binomial name
- Nothobranchius neumanni (Hilgendorf, 1905)

Synonyms
- Fundulus neumanni Hilgendorf, 1905; Aphyosemion neumanni (Hilgendorf, 1905)

Species of fish

Nothobranchius neumanni is a species of killifish in the family Nothobranchiidae. It is endemic to Tanzania. It occurs in both perennial and seasonal wetlands including rivers, lakes and ponds where it most likely feeds on planktonic crustaceans. This species was described as Fundulus neumanni by Franz Hilgendorf in 1905. The specific name honours Hilgendorf's companion on some of his expeditions to Africa, the German ornithologist Oscar Neumann (1867–1946).
