= Nothobranchius fuscotaeniatus =

Conservation status
- Critically Endangered (IUCN 3.1)

Scientific classification
- Kingdom: Animalia
- Phylum: Chordata
- Class: Actinopterygii
- Order: Cyprinodontiformes
- Family: Nothobranchiidae
- Genus: Nothobranchius
- Species: N. fuscotaeniatus

Binomial name
- Nothobranchius fuscotaeniatus Seegers, 1997

Species of fish

Nothobranchius fuscotaeniatus is a species of killifish in the family Nothobranchiidae. It is endemic to Tanzania.

== Links ==
- Nothobranchius fuscotaeniatus on WildNothos
