= Nothobranchius angelae =

Conservation status
- Vulnerable (IUCN 3.1)

Scientific classification
- Kingdom: Animalia
- Phylum: Chordata
- Class: Actinopterygii
- Order: Cyprinodontiformes
- Family: Nothobranchiidae
- Genus: Nothobranchius
- Species: N. angelae

Binomial name
- Nothobranchius angelae Watters, Nagy & Bellstedt, 2019

Species of fish

Nothobranchius angelae is a species of brightly colored seasonal killifish in the family Nothobranchiidae. This species is endemic to seasonal freshwater habitats in north-central Tanzania in Eastern Africa.

== Etymology ==
The fish is named in honor of Angela Watters.

== Links ==
- Nothobranchius angelae on WildNothos - various information and photographs of this species
