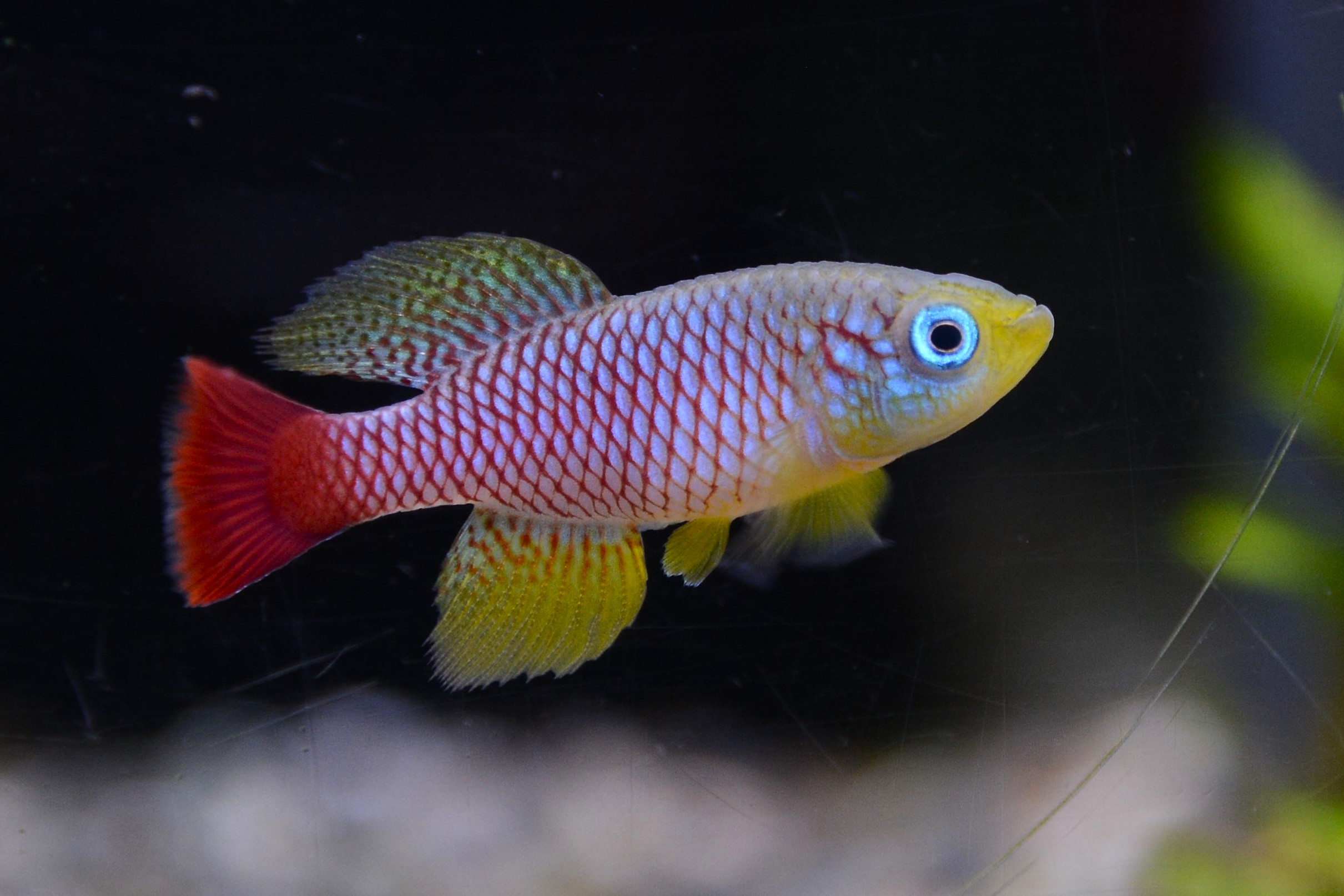

Conservation status
- Vulnerable (IUCN 3.1)

Scientific classification
- Kingdom: Animalia
- Phylum: Chordata
- Class: Actinopterygii
- Order: Cyprinodontiformes
- Family: Nothobranchiidae
- Genus: Nothobranchius
- Species: N. foerschi

Binomial name
- Nothobranchius foerschi Wildekamp & Berkenkamp, 1979

= Nothobranchius foerschi =

Species of fish

Nothobranchius foerschi is a species of killifish in the family Nothobranchiidae. It is endemic to Tanzania. Its natural habitat is probably temporary pools. The specific name honours the German physician and aquaris Walter Foersch (1932–1993), who was an expert in killifish and was one of the first people to keep and breed this species.
