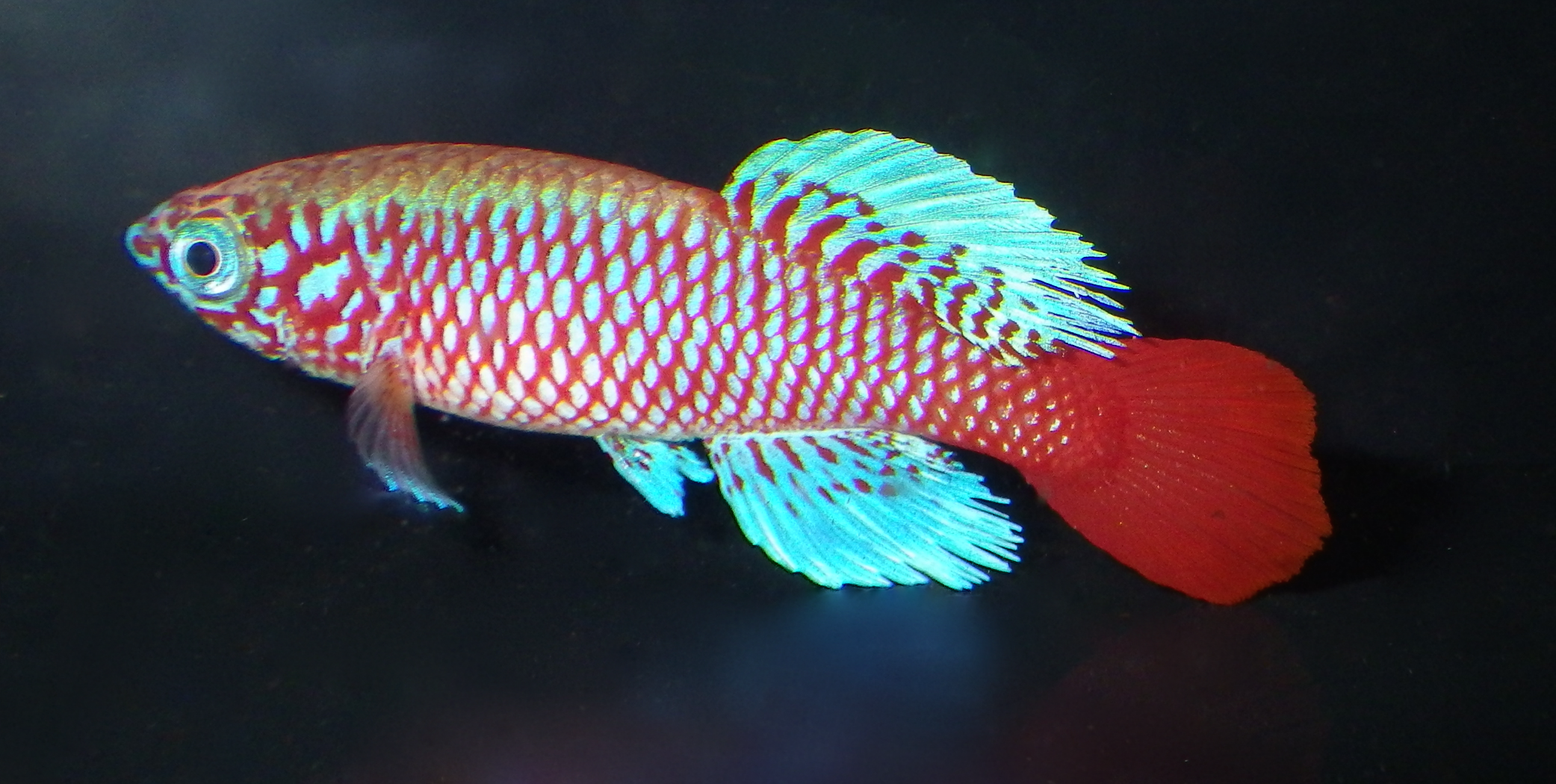

Conservation status
- Vulnerable (IUCN 3.1)

Scientific classification
- Kingdom: Animalia
- Phylum: Chordata
- Class: Actinopterygii
- Order: Cyprinodontiformes
- Family: Nothobranchiidae
- Genus: Nothobranchius
- Species: N. kilomberoensis

Binomial name
- Nothobranchius kilomberoensis Wildekamp, Watters & Sainthouse, 2002

= Nothobranchius kilomberoensis =

Species of fish

Nothobranchius kilomberoensis is a species of killifish in the family Nothobranchiidae. It is endemic to Tanzania where it is found in the floodplain of the Kilombero River where it is found in turbid, seasonal pools.

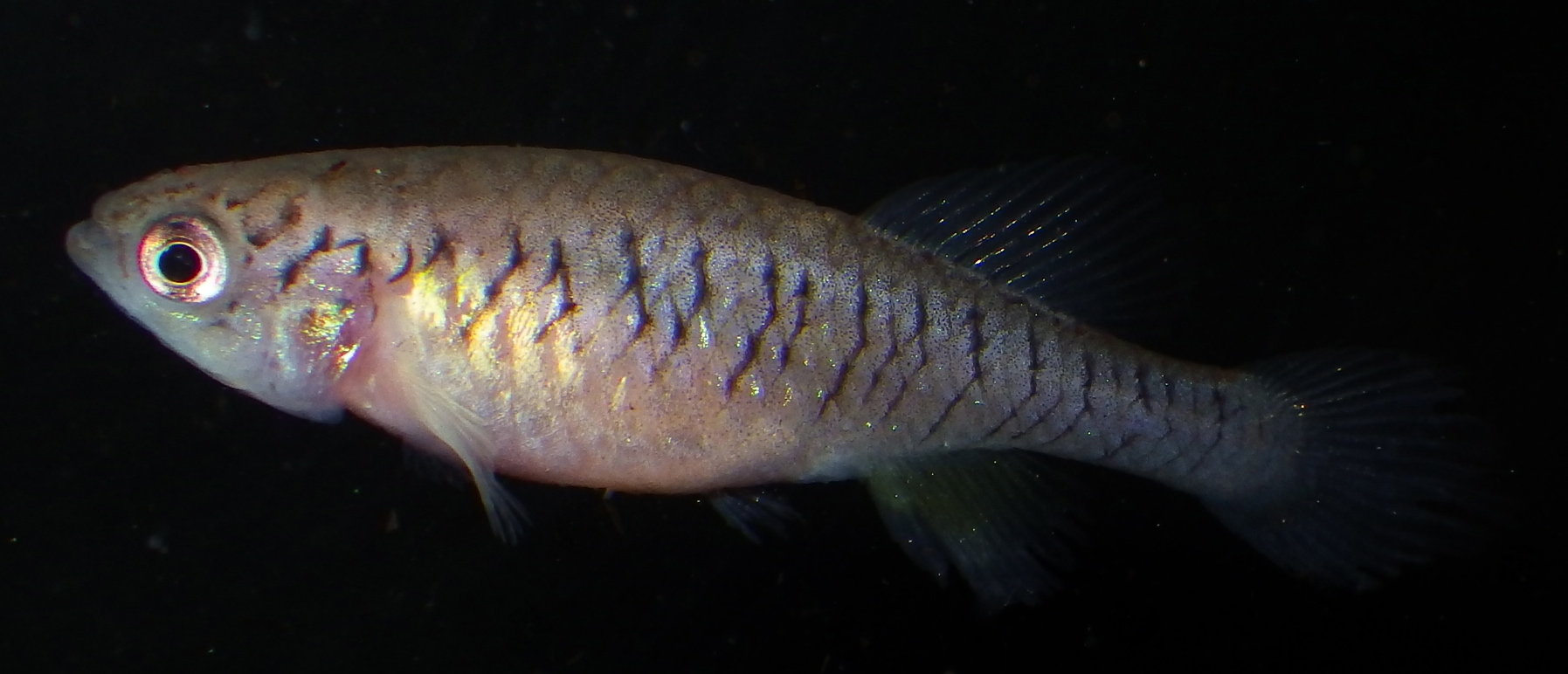
N. kilomberoensis female

== Links ==
- Nothobranchius kilomberoensis on WildNothos

Nothobranchius kilomberoensis on N.M.G.
