= Boji Plains nothobranch =

Conservation status
- Vulnerable (IUCN 3.1)

Scientific classification
- Kingdom: Animalia
- Phylum: Chordata
- Class: Actinopterygii
- Order: Cyprinodontiformes
- Family: Nothobranchiidae
- Genus: Nothobranchius
- Species: N. bojiensis

Binomial name
- Nothobranchius bojiensis Wildekamp & R. Haas, 1992

Species of fish

The Boji Plains nothobranch (Nothobranchius bojiensis) is a species of fish (a killifish) in the family Nothobranchiidae, endemic to the drainage of the Ewaso Nyiro in Kenya. Its natural habitat is intermittent freshwater marshes.

== Links ==
- Nothobranchius bojiensis on WildNothos
