= Mnanzini nothobranch =

Conservation status
- Vulnerable (IUCN 3.1)

Scientific classification
- Kingdom: Animalia
- Phylum: Chordata
- Class: Actinopterygii
- Order: Cyprinodontiformes
- Family: Nothobranchiidae
- Genus: Nothobranchius
- Species: N. willerti

Binomial name
- Nothobranchius willerti Wildekamp, 1992

Species of fish

The Mnanzini nothobranch (Nothobranchius willerti) is a species of killifish in the family Nothobranchiidae. It is endemic to Kenya where it occurs on the floodplains of the lower Tana River system. In terms of habitat it is found in temporary waterbodies and connecting streams. The specific name honours the German aquarist Manfred Willert who helped to collect the type and then donated it to Rudolf Hans Wildekamp Wildekamp described the species in 1992.

== Links ==
- Nothobranchius willerti on WildNothos - various information and photographs of this species
