= Nothobranchius ocellatus =

Conservation status
- Near Threatened (IUCN 3.1)

Scientific classification
- Kingdom: Animalia
- Phylum: Chordata
- Class: Actinopterygii
- Order: Cyprinodontiformes
- Family: Nothobranchiidae
- Genus: Nothobranchius
- Species: N. ocellatus

Binomial name
- Nothobranchius ocellatus (Seegers, 1985)

Synonyms
- Paranothobranchius ocellatus Seegers, 1985

Species of fish

Nothobranchius ocellatus is a species of killifish in the family Nothobranchiidae. It is endemic to Tanzania. This species was described as Paranothobranchius ocellatus in 1985 by Lothar Seegers with the type locality given as being a swamp between Mtanza and the northern entrance of the Selous Game Reserve in the drainage basin of the Rufiji River north of Rufiji in eastern Tanzania.
