= Elongate nothobranch =

Conservation status
- Vulnerable (IUCN 3.1)

Scientific classification
- Kingdom: Animalia
- Phylum: Chordata
- Class: Actinopterygii
- Order: Cyprinodontiformes
- Family: Nothobranchiidae
- Genus: Nothobranchius
- Species: N. elongatus

Binomial name
- Nothobranchius elongatus Wildekamp, 1982

Species of fish

The elongate nothobranch (Nothobranchius elongatus) is a species of killifish in the family Nothobranchiidae. It is endemic to the coastal drainages to the north west of Mombasa in Kenya. Its natural habitat is intermittent freshwater marshes and temporary pools on floodplains.

== Links ==
- Nothobranchius elongatus on WildNothos
