= Nothobranchius aff. taeniopygus =

Conservation status
- Vulnerable (IUCN 3.1)

Scientific classification
- Domain: Eukaryota
- Kingdom: Animalia
- Phylum: Chordata
- Class: Actinopterygii
- Order: Cyprinodontiformes
- Family: Nothobranchiidae
- Genus: Nothobranchius
- Species: N. aff. taeniopygus

Binomial name
- Nothobranchius aff. taeniopygus

Species of fish

Nothobranchius aff. taeniopygus is a species of fish in the family Aplocheilidae. It is endemic to Uganda. Its natural habitat is rivers.
