= Nothobranchius geminus =

Conservation status
- Vulnerable (IUCN 3.1)

Scientific classification
- Kingdom: Animalia
- Phylum: Chordata
- Class: Actinopterygii
- Order: Cyprinodontiformes
- Family: Nothobranchiidae
- Genus: Nothobranchius
- Species: N. geminus

Binomial name
- Nothobranchius geminus Wildekamp, Watters & Sainthouse, 2002

Species of fish

Nothobranchius geminus is a species of killifish in the family Nothobranchiidae. It is endemic to Tanzania. Its natural habitat is intermittent freshwater pools where it feeds on invertebrates at the surface.

== Links ==
- Nothobranchius geminus on WildNothos
