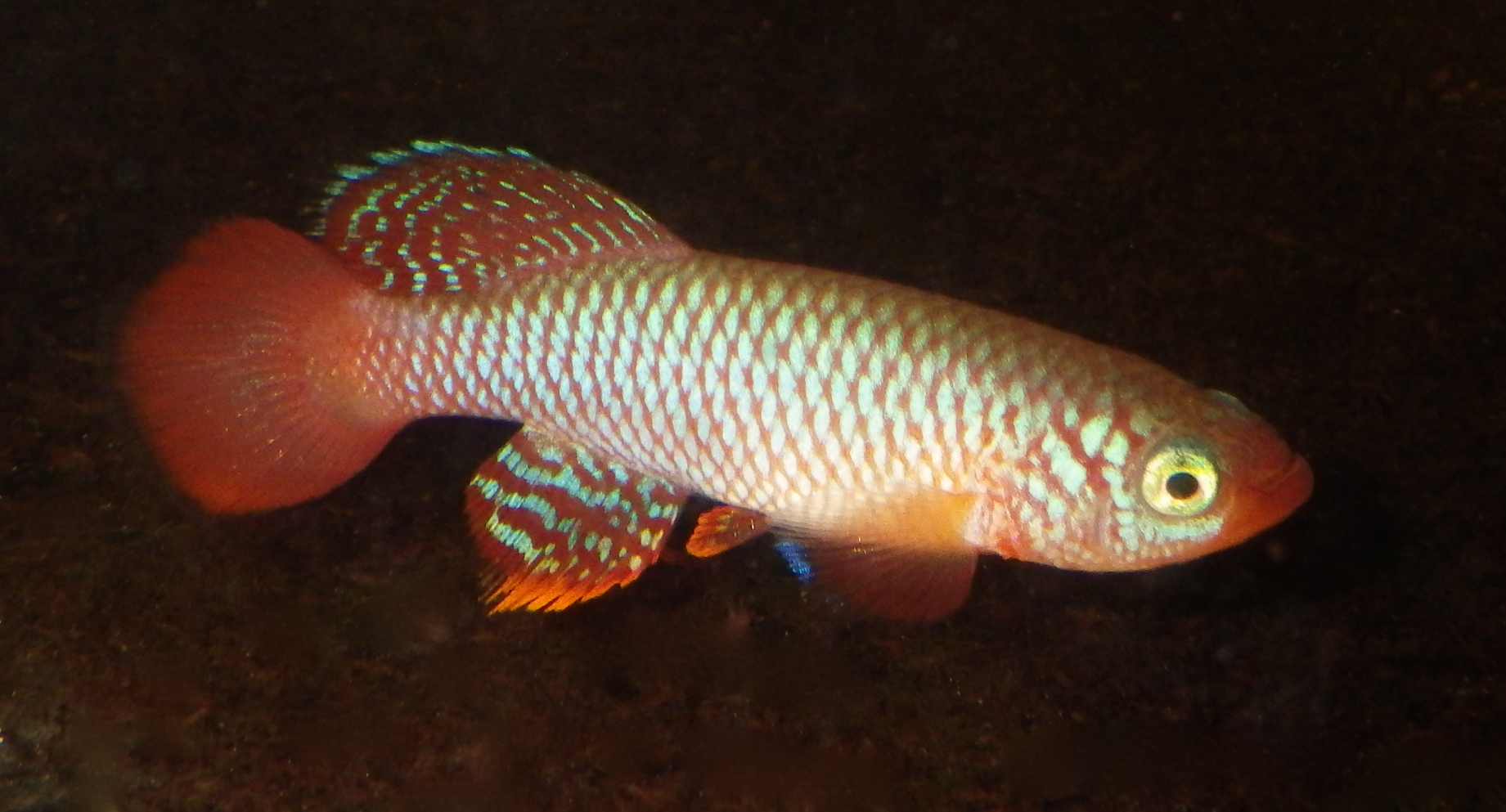

Conservation status
- Vulnerable (IUCN 3.1)

Scientific classification
- Kingdom: Animalia
- Phylum: Chordata
- Class: Actinopterygii
- Order: Cyprinodontiformes
- Family: Nothobranchiidae
- Genus: Nothobranchius
- Species: N. flammicomantis

Binomial name
- Nothobranchius flammicomantis Wildekamp, Watters & Sainthouse, 1998

= Nothobranchius flammicomantis =

Species of fish

The Kisaki nothobranch (Nothobranchius flammicomantis) is a species of killifish in the family Nothobranchiidae. It is endemic to Tanzania. Its natural habitat is seasonal pools.

== Links ==
- Nothobranchius flammicomantis on WildNothos
