= Nothobranchius luekei =

Conservation status
- Endangered (IUCN 3.1)

Scientific classification
- Kingdom: Animalia
- Phylum: Chordata
- Class: Actinopterygii
- Order: Cyprinodontiformes
- Family: Nothobranchiidae
- Genus: Nothobranchius
- Species: N. luekei

Binomial name
- Nothobranchius luekei Seegers, 1984

Species of fish

Nothobranchius luekei is a species of killifish in the family Nothobranchiidae. It is endemic to Tanzania. Its natural habitat is temporary pools. Its specific name honours the German aquarist Karl Heinz Lüke who was the first person to breed this species in an aquarium.
