= Nothobranchius attenboroughi =

Conservation status
- Vulnerable (IUCN 3.1)

Scientific classification
- Kingdom: Animalia
- Phylum: Chordata
- Class: Actinopterygii
- Order: Cyprinodontiformes
- Family: Nothobranchiidae
- Genus: Nothobranchius
- Species: N. attenboroughi

Binomial name
- Nothobranchius attenboroughi Nagy, Watters & Bellstedt, 2020

Species of fish

Nothobranchius attenboroughi is a species of brightly colored seasonal killifish in the family Nothobranchiidae. It is endemic to Tanzania. It is currently known from ephemeral pools and marshes associated with the Grumeti River and other small systems draining into Lake Victoria at the east side of the lake, which ecological integrity is maintained by the congruence of its catchments largely within the Serengeti-Mara ecosystem.

== Etymology ==
This species was named "in honour of Sir David Attenborough, in recognition of his dedicated efforts to promote biophilia: raising awareness of the wonders and beauties of nature for so many people worldwide, promoting awareness of the importance of biodiversity conservation, and above all, inspiring so many researchers in the field of natural history, including the authors."

== Habitat ==
The small and colourful Nothobranchius fishes inhabit ephemeral habitats in freshwater wetlands of Africa and have extreme life-history adaptations. Members of the genus are recognized as seasonal fishes, with all known species having an annual or semi-annual life cycle, a key adaptation to reproduce in the seasonally arid savannah biome and allowing their eggs to survive the periodic drying up of the seasonal natural habitats.

== Threats ==
Nothobranchius fishes are subject to high levels of threat, with 72% of the species falling into one of the Threatened Red List categories, as a consequence of habitat destruction of seasonal wetlands. There is, therefore, a need to conserve ephemeral waters for species that rely on the seasonality of habitats. Phases in the seasonal life cycle underscore the vulnerabilities of ecological factors that need to be preserved to maintain the structural integrity of the habitats throughout both seasonal phases of wet and dry seasons.

== Links ==
- Nothobranchius attenboroughi on WildNothos - various information and photographs of this species

Bellstedt
