= Nothobranchius sp. nov. 'Lake Victoria' =

Conservation status
- Vulnerable (IUCN 3.1)

Scientific classification
- Domain: Eukaryota
- Kingdom: Animalia
- Phylum: Chordata
- Class: Actinopterygii
- Order: Cyprinodontiformes
- Family: Nothobranchiidae
- Genus: Nothobranchius
- Species: N. sp. nov. 'Lake Victoria'

Binomial name
- Nothobranchius sp. nov. 'Lake Victoria'

Species of fish

Nothobranchius sp. nov. 'Lake Victoria' is a scientifically undescribed species of freshwater fish in the family Nothobranchiidae. It is endemic to Kenya, and inhabits intermittent freshwater marshes. It was listed as vulnerable in the IUCN Red List of Threatened Species in 2004, but is not included in recent versions of the list.
