= Nothobranchius steinforti =

Conservation status
- Critically endangered, possibly extinct in the wild (IUCN 3.1)

Scientific classification
- Kingdom: Animalia
- Phylum: Chordata
- Class: Actinopterygii
- Order: Cyprinodontiformes
- Family: Nothobranchiidae
- Genus: Nothobranchius
- Species: N. steinforti

Binomial name
- Nothobranchius steinforti Wildekamp, 1977

Species of fish

Nothobranchius steinforti is a species of killifish in the family Nothobranchiidae. It is endemic to Upper Wami River drainage, Tanzania. Its natural habitat is intermittent freshwater marshes, pools and rice fields. This species was described in 1977 by Rudolf Hans Wildekamp with the type locality given as "8 kilometers from Kimamba, Tanzania". The specific name honours the Dutch aquarist Theo Steinfort who helped collect the type and bred this species in captivity, making it available to other killifish hobbyists.
