= Nothobranchius capriviensis =

Conservation status
- Endangered (IUCN 3.1)

Scientific classification
- Kingdom: Animalia
- Phylum: Chordata
- Class: Actinopterygii
- Order: Cyprinodontiformes
- Family: Nothobranchiidae
- Genus: Nothobranchius
- Species: N. capriviensis

Binomial name
- Nothobranchius capriviensis Watters, Wildekamp & Shidlovskiy, 2015

Species of fish

Nothobranchius capriviensis is a species of seasonal killifish in the family Nothobranchiidae. They are small: adult male specimen generally reach 3.5–4 centimetres (1.4–1.6 in) while females are even smaller. Males are mainly of blue color with irregular red-brown, chevron crossbars covering the body, while females are gray with a brown tint. The species is endemic to seasonal freshwater habitats in the Zambezi Region of Namibia.

Phases in the seasonal life cycle underscore the vulnerabilities of ecological factors that need to be preserved to maintain the structural integrity of the habitats throughout both seasonal phases of wet and dry seasons.
