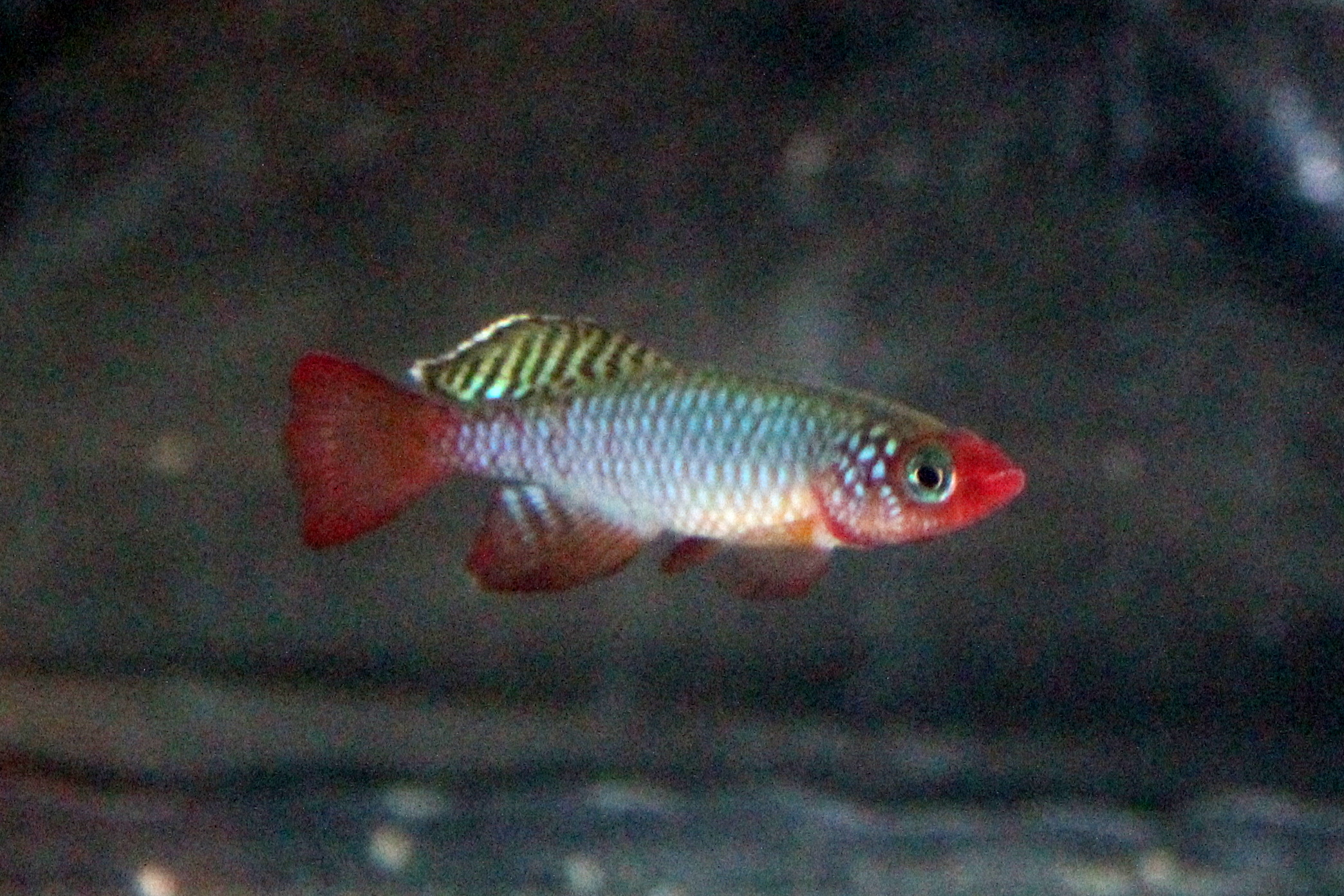

Conservation status
- Endangered (IUCN 3.1)

Scientific classification
- Kingdom: Animalia
- Phylum: Chordata
- Class: Actinopterygii
- Order: Cyprinodontiformes
- Family: Nothobranchiidae
- Genus: Nothobranchius
- Species: N. rubripinnis

Binomial name
- Nothobranchius rubripinnis Seegers, 1986

= Nothobranchius rubripinnis =

Species of fish

Nothobranchius rubripinnis is a species of killifish in the family Nothobranchiidae. It is endemic to Tanzania. Its natural habitats are rivers and rice fields.
