= Nothobranchius venustus =

Conservation status
- Vulnerable (IUCN 3.1)

Scientific classification
- Kingdom: Animalia
- Phylum: Chordata
- Class: Actinopterygii
- Order: Cyprinodontiformes
- Family: Nothobranchiidae
- Genus: Nothobranchius
- Species: N. venustus

Binomial name
- Nothobranchius venustus Nagy, Watters & Bellstedt, 2020

Species of fish

Nothobranchius venustus is a species of brightly colored seasonal killifish in the family Nothobranchiidae. This species is endemic to seasonal freshwater habitats in north-western Tanzania. It is currently known from ephemeral pools and marshes associated with smaller stream systems as part of the Lake Victoria basin, in the southwestern shore region of the lake, and eastwards to the Kongwa River region.

== Links ==
- Nothobranchius venustus on WildNothos - various information and photographs of this species
