= Nothobranchius ivanovae =

Conservation status
- Vulnerable (IUCN 3.1)

Scientific classification
- Kingdom: Animalia
- Phylum: Chordata
- Class: Actinopterygii
- Order: Cyprinodontiformes
- Family: Nothobranchiidae
- Genus: Nothobranchius
- Species: N. ivanovae

Binomial name
- Nothobranchius ivanovae Valdesalici, 2012

Species of fish

Nothobranchius ivanovae is a species of seasonal killifish in the family Nothobranchiidae. They are small: adult male specimen generally reach 4–5 centimetres (1.6–2.0 in) while females are even smaller and less brightly colored. This species is endemic to seasonal freshwater habitats in western Tanzania. It is currently known from a large marshland in Katavi National Park that covers approximately 50 km from Kabungo to Sibwesa, and belongs to the Katuma River drainage in western Tanzania.

Phases in the seasonal life cycle underscore the vulnerabilities of ecological factors that need to be preserved to maintain the structural integrity of the habitats throughout both seasonal phases of wet and dry seasons.
