= Kikambala nothobranch =

Conservation status
- Endangered (IUCN 3.1)

Scientific classification
- Kingdom: Animalia
- Phylum: Chordata
- Class: Actinopterygii
- Order: Cyprinodontiformes
- Family: Nothobranchiidae
- Genus: Nothobranchius
- Species: N. interruptus

Binomial name
- Nothobranchius interruptus Wildekamp & Berkenkamp, 1979

Species of fish

The Kikambala nothobranch (Nothobranchius interruptus) is a species of killifish in the family Nothobranchiidae. It is endemic to Kenya. Its natural habitats are swamps and temporary pools.
