= Nothobranchius elucens =

Conservation status
- Vulnerable (IUCN 3.1)

Scientific classification
- Kingdom: Animalia
- Phylum: Chordata
- Class: Actinopterygii
- Order: Cyprinodontiformes
- Family: Nothobranchiidae
- Genus: Nothobranchius
- Species: N. elucens

Binomial name
- Nothobranchius elucens Nagy, 2021

Species of fish

Nothobranchius elucens is a species of brightly colored seasonal killifish in the family Nothobranchiidae. This species is endemic to northern Uganda. It is currently known from temporary swamps in the Achwa River system in the upper Nile drainage.

The small and colourful Nothobranchius fishes inhabit ephemeral habitats in freshwater wetlands of Africa and have extreme life-history adaptations. Members of the genus are recognized as seasonal fishes, with all known species having an annual or semi-annual life cycle, a key adaptation to reproduce in the seasonally arid savannah biome and allowing their eggs to survive the periodic drying up of the seasonal natural habitats.

== Links ==
- Nothobranchius elucens on WildNothos - various information and photographs of this species
