= Nothobranchius kafuensis =

Conservation status
- Least Concern (IUCN 3.1)

Scientific classification
- Kingdom: Animalia
- Phylum: Chordata
- Class: Actinopterygii
- Order: Cyprinodontiformes
- Family: Nothobranchiidae
- Genus: Nothobranchius
- Species: N. kafuensis

Binomial name
- Nothobranchius kafuensis Wildekamp & Rosenstock, 1989

Species of fish

Nothobranchius kafuensis, known as the Caprivi killifish or Kafue killifish, is a species of killifish in the family Nothobranchiidae. This killifish is found in temporary pools, swamps and ditches in the floodplains of the Kafue and Upper Zambezi rivers in western Zambia and the Caprivi Strip in Namibia.

== Links ==
- Nothobranchius kafuensis on WildNothos
