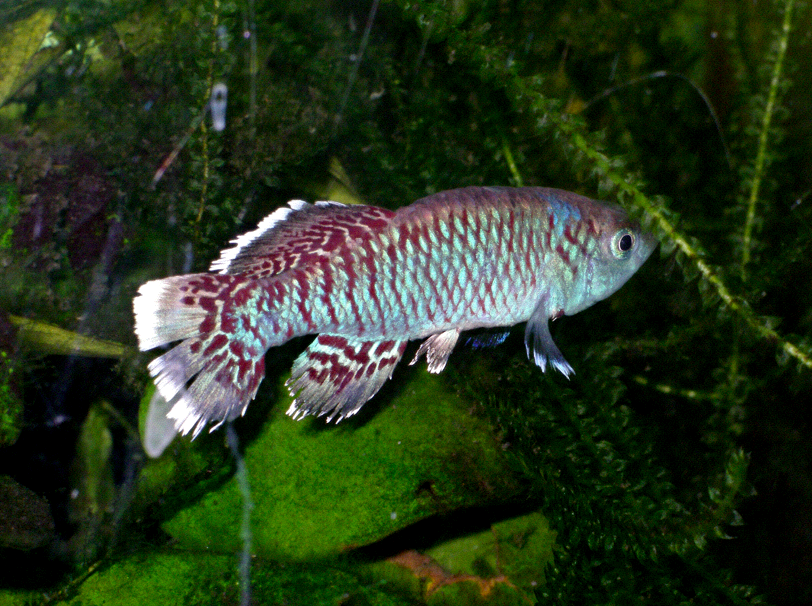
- Male of the species

Conservation status
- Least Concern (IUCN 3.1)

Scientific classification
- Kingdom: Animalia
- Phylum: Chordata
- Class: Actinopterygii
- Order: Cyprinodontiformes
- Family: Nothobranchiidae
- Genus: Nothobranchius
- Species: N. eggersi

Binomial name
- Nothobranchius eggersi Seegers, 1982

= Nothobranchius eggersi =

Species of fish

The orchid nothobranch (Nothobranchius eggersi) is a species of killifish in the family Nothobranchiidae. It is endemic to the lower basin of the Rufiji River in Tanzania. Its natural habitat is temporary pools and swamps. This species is found in both a blue and red form. This species was described in 1982 by Lothar Seegers with the type biology given as the Rufiji River near Utete, Rufiji District of Pwani Region in Tanzania. The specific name honours Seegers companion on two expeditions, the German aquarist Gerd Eggers.

== Links ==
- Nothobranchius eggersi on WildNothos
