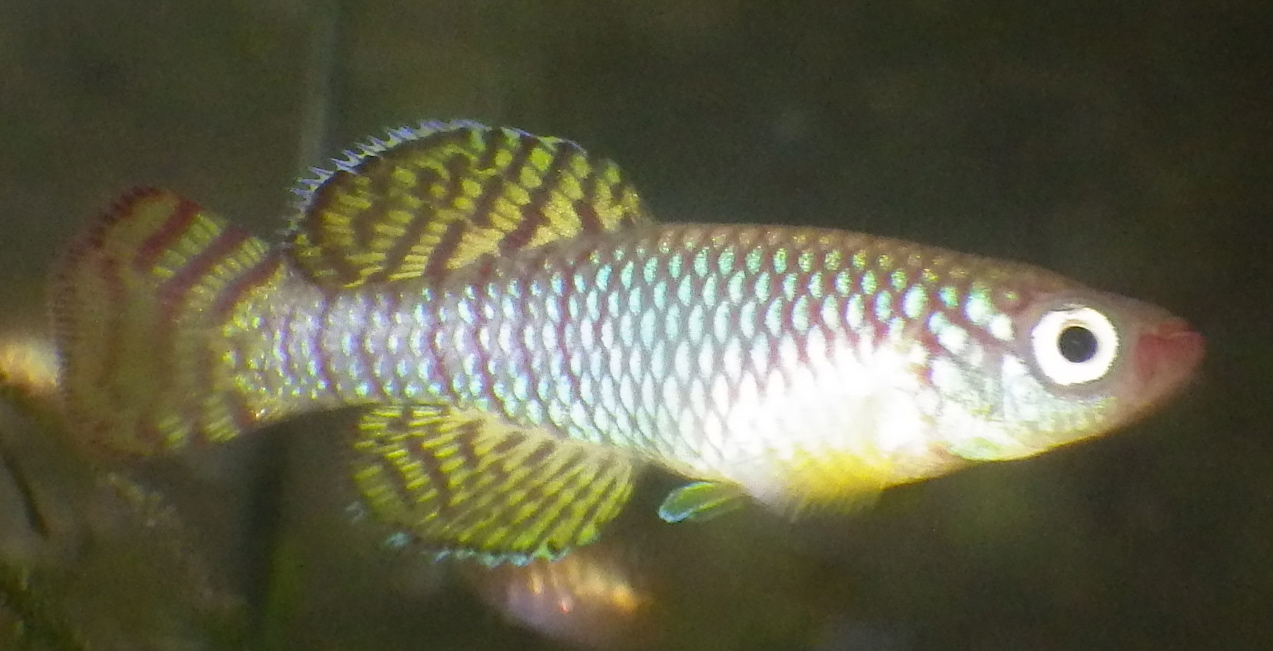

Conservation status
- Endangered (IUCN 3.1)

Scientific classification
- Kingdom: Animalia
- Phylum: Chordata
- Class: Actinopterygii
- Order: Cyprinodontiformes
- Family: Nothobranchiidae
- Genus: Nothobranchius
- Species: N. korthausae

Binomial name
- Nothobranchius korthausae Meinken, 1973

= Nothobranchius korthausae =

Species of fish

Nothobranchius korthausae is a species of killifish in the family Nothobranchiidae. It is endemic to Mafia Island in Tanzania. Its natural habitat is pools, ditches and small streams. The specific name of this species honours the German aquarist Edith Korthaus who collected the type.

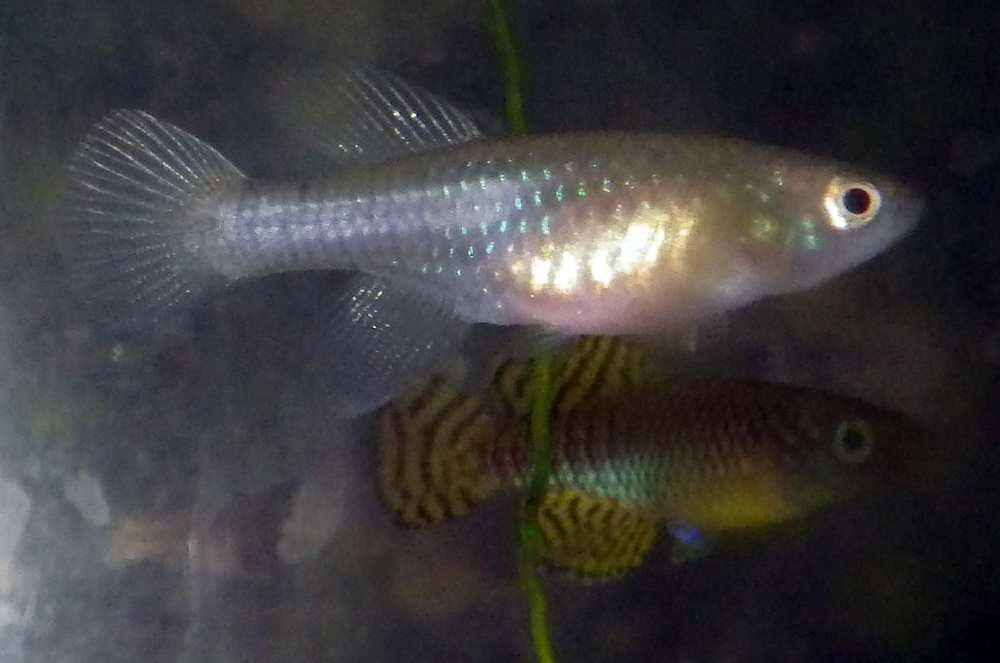
Female N. korthausae with male in background
