= Uganda nothobranch =

Conservation status
- Least Concern (IUCN 3.1)

Scientific classification
- Kingdom: Animalia
- Phylum: Chordata
- Class: Actinopterygii
- Order: Cyprinodontiformes
- Family: Nothobranchiidae
- Genus: Nothobranchius
- Species: N. ugandensis

Binomial name
- Nothobranchius ugandensis Wildekamp, 1994

Species of fish

The Uganda nothobranch (Nothobranchius ugandensis) is a species of killifish in the family Nothobranchiidae. It is found in Kenya and Uganda, also possibly in Tanzania. Its natural habitat is intermittent freshwater marshes.
