= Nothobranchius jubbi =

Conservation status
- Least Concern (IUCN 3.1)

Scientific classification
- Kingdom: Animalia
- Phylum: Chordata
- Class: Actinopterygii
- Division: Teleostei
- Order: Cyprinodontiformes
- Family: Nothobranchiidae
- Genus: Nothobranchius
- Species: N. jubbi

Binomial name
- Nothobranchius jubbi Wildekamp & Berkenkamp, 1979

Species of fish

Nothobranchius jubbi is a species of killifish in the family Nothobranchiidae. It occurs in north eastern Africa in Kenya, Somalia and Ethiopia in temporary pools, ditches, marshes and rain pans, normally ones without any connections to rivers. This species was described in 1979 by Rudolf Hans Wildekamp and Heinz Otto Berkenkamp with the type locality given as a pool on the road to Garsen, 17 miles north of Malindi. The specific name honours the South African meteorologist and ichthyologist Reginald A. "Rex" Jubb (1905–1987) of the Freshwater Fish Section at the Albany Museum in Grahamstown, South Africa, in recognition of his taxonomic work on the genus Nothobranchius.

== Links ==
- Nothobranchius jubbi on WildNothos
