= Small scaled nothobranch =

Conservation status
- Vulnerable (IUCN 3.1)

Scientific classification
- Kingdom: Animalia
- Phylum: Chordata
- Class: Actinopterygii
- Order: Cyprinodontiformes
- Family: Nothobranchiidae
- Genus: Nothobranchius
- Species: N. microlepis

Binomial name
- Nothobranchius microlepis (Vinciguerra, 1897)

Synonyms
- Fundulus microlepis Vinciguerra, 1897; Fundulopanchax microlepis (Vinciguerra, 1897)

Species of fish

The small-scaled nothobranch (Nothobranchius microlepis) is a species of killifish in the family Nothobranchiidae. It occurs in northeastern Africa in Kenya, Somalia and Ethiopia. Its natural habitat is intermittent freshwater wetlands.
