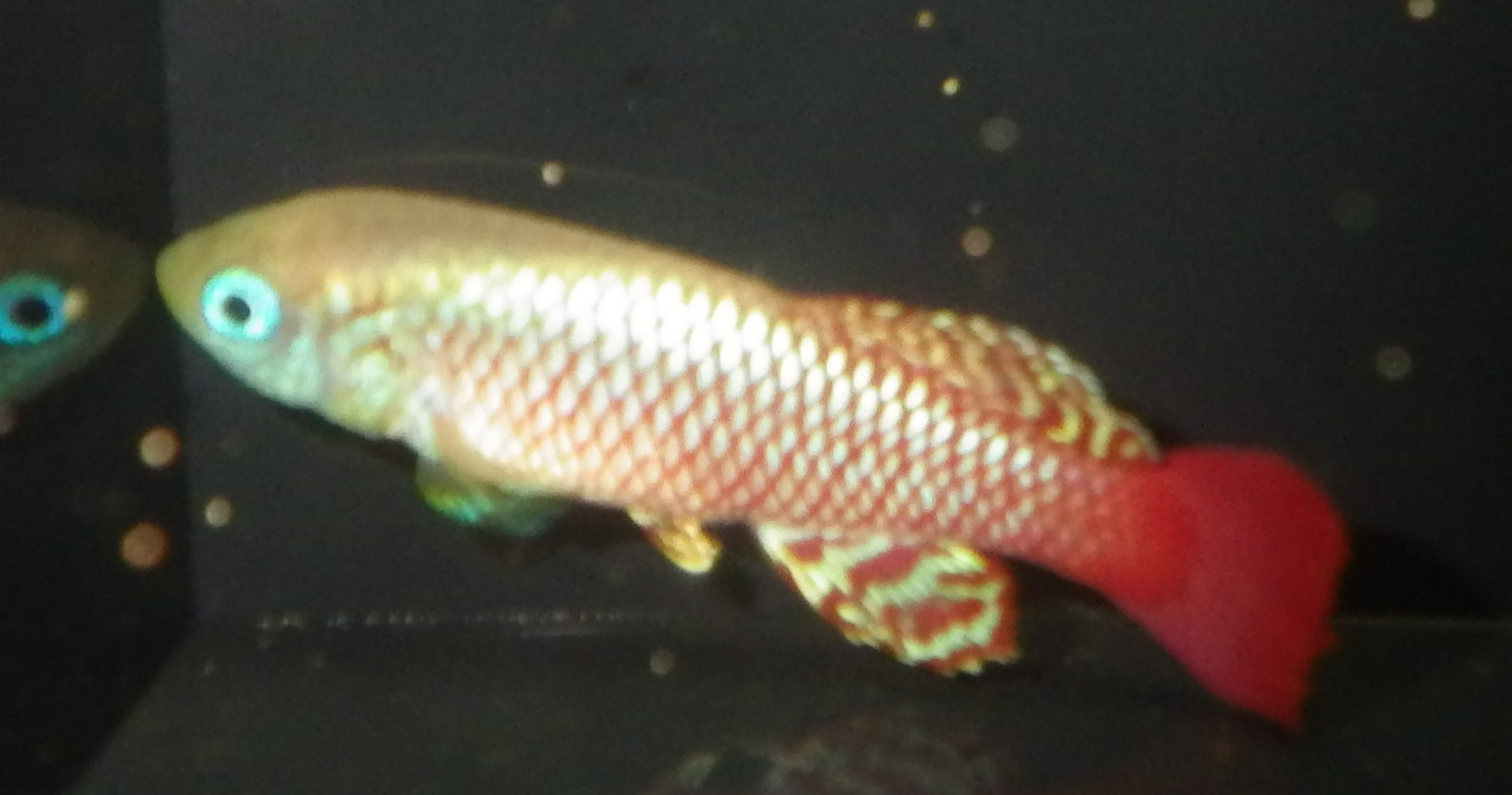

Conservation status
- Vulnerable (IUCN 3.1)

Scientific classification
- Kingdom: Animalia
- Phylum: Chordata
- Class: Actinopterygii
- Order: Cyprinodontiformes
- Family: Nothobranchiidae
- Genus: Nothobranchius
- Species: N. palmqvisti

Binomial name
- Nothobranchius palmqvisti (Lönnberg, 1907)

Synonyms
- Fundulus palmqvisti Lönnberg, 1907; Fundulopanchax palmquisti (Lönnberg, 1907); Nothobranchius palmquisti (Lönnberg, 1907)

= Nothobranchius palmqvisti =

Species of fish

Nothobranchius palmqvisti is a species of killifish in the family Nothobranchiidae. It is found in Kenya and Tanzania. Its natural habitats are swamps and intermittent freshwater marshes. This species was described as Fundulus palmqvisti by Einar Lönnberg in 1907 with the type locality being Tanga in the Usambara Mountains of north eastern Tanzania, the type being collected on the 1905–06 Sjöstedts Kilimandjaro-Meru Expedition. The specific name honours the patron of that expedition, Gustaf Palmqvist.
