= Nothobranchius chochamandai =

Conservation status
- Vulnerable (IUCN 3.1)

Scientific classification
- Kingdom: Animalia
- Phylum: Chordata
- Class: Actinopterygii
- Order: Cyprinodontiformes
- Family: Nothobranchiidae
- Genus: Nothobranchius
- Species: N. chochamandai

Binomial name
- Nothobranchius chochamandai Nagy, 2014

Species of fish

Nothobranchius chochamandai is a species of seasonal killifish in the family Nothobranchiidae. This species is endemic to south-eastern Democratic Republic of Congo. It is known only from the area of the type locality - ephemeral marshes of the Kinikabwimba River, a tributary of Lufutishi River in the middle Luapula River drainage.

== Etymology ==
The fish is named in honor of Auguste Chocha Manda, of the University of Lubumbashi in Katanga, Democratic Republic of the Congo, because of his dedication in the research of the fishes of his country.

== Habitat ==
The small and colourful Nothobranchius fishes inhabit ephemeral habitats in freshwater wetlands of Africa and have extreme life-history adaptations. Members of the genus are recognized as seasonal fishes, with all known species having an annual or semi-annual life cycle, a key adaptation to reproduce in the seasonally arid savannah biome and allowing their eggs to survive the periodic drying up of the seasonal natural habitats.

== Links ==
- Nothobranchius chochamandai on WildNothos - various information and photographs of this species
