= Nothobranchius albertinensis =

Conservation status
- Vulnerable (IUCN 3.1)

Scientific classification
- Kingdom: Animalia
- Phylum: Chordata
- Class: Actinopterygii
- Order: Cyprinodontiformes
- Family: Nothobranchiidae
- Genus: Nothobranchius
- Species: N. albertinensis

Binomial name
- Nothobranchius albertinensis Nagy, Watters & Bellstedt, 2020

Species of fish

Nothobranchius albertinensis is a species of brightly colored seasonal killifish in the family Nothobranchiidae. This species is endemic to seasonal freshwater habitats in north-western Uganda. It is currently known from ephemeral pools and marshes associated with the Albert Nile drainage, as well as small river systems draining into the north-eastern part of Lake Albert.

The small and colourful Nothobranchius fishes inhabit ephemeral habitats in freshwater wetlands of Africa and have extreme life-history adaptations. Members of the genus are recognized as seasonal fishes, with all known species having an annual or semi-annual life cycle, a key adaptation to reproduce in the seasonally arid savannah biome and allowing their eggs to survive the periodic drying up of the seasonal natural habitats.

Nothobranchius fishes are subject to high levels of threat, with 72% of the species falling into one of the Threatened Red List categories, as a consequence of habitat destruction of seasonal wetlands. There is, therefore, a need to conserve ephemeral waters for species that rely on the seasonality of habitats. Phases in the seasonal life cycle underscore the vulnerabilities of ecological factors that need to be preserved to maintain the structural integrity of the habitats throughout both seasonal phases of wet and dry seasons.

== Etymology ==
The specific epithet comes from the Albertine Rift of Uganda, the valley in which this fish occurs in the northern Lake Albert basin, and extending on into the Albert Nile drainage.

== Links ==
- Nothobranchius albertinensis on WildNothos - various information and photographs of this species
