= Nothobranchius albimarginatus =

Conservation status
- Endangered (IUCN 3.1)

Scientific classification
- Kingdom: Animalia
- Phylum: Chordata
- Class: Actinopterygii
- Order: Cyprinodontiformes
- Family: Nothobranchiidae
- Genus: Nothobranchius
- Species: N. albimarginatus

Binomial name
- Nothobranchius albimarginatus Watters, Wildekamp & Cooper, 1998

Species of fish

Nothobranchius albimarginatus is a species of fish in the family Aplocheilidae. It is endemic to Tanzania. Its natural habitats are intermittent rivers and shrub-dominated wetlands. It has only been recorded from two pools on the road between Dar es Salaam and Ikwiriri, half a kilometre south of the Lukwale River, these pools being the type locality.

== Links ==
- Nothobranchius albimarginatus on WildNothos - various information and photographs of this species
