= Nothobranchius lourensi =

Conservation status
- Near Threatened (IUCN 3.1)

Scientific classification
- Kingdom: Animalia
- Phylum: Chordata
- Class: Actinopterygii
- Order: Cyprinodontiformes
- Family: Nothobranchiidae
- Genus: Nothobranchius
- Species: N. lourensi

Binomial name
- Nothobranchius lourensi Wildekamp, 1977

Species of fish

Nothobranchius lourensi is a species of fish in the family Nothobranchiidae. It is known only from the floodplain of the Ruvu River in eastern Tanzania where it is found in temporary pools, where the type was originally collected by Jan Lourens, a biologist with the United Nations Development Programme in Dar es Salaam and who is honoured in its specific name.
