= N. robustus =

N. robustus may refer to:

- Nassarius robustus, a sea snail species
- Nothobranchius robustus, the red victoria nothobranch, a fish species found in Kenya, Tanzania and Uganda
- Notomys robustus, the great hopping mouse, an extinct rodent species known only from skulls found in owl pellets in the Flinders Ranges in Australia
