= Nothobranchius robustus =

Conservation status
- Least Concern (IUCN 3.1)

Scientific classification
- Kingdom: Animalia
- Phylum: Chordata
- Class: Actinopterygii
- Order: Cyprinodontiformes
- Family: Nothobranchiidae
- Genus: Nothobranchius
- Species: N. robustus

Binomial name
- Nothobranchius robustus C. G. E. Ahl, 1935

Species of fish

Nothobranchius robustus, the red Victoria nothobranch, is a species of killifish in the family Nothobranchiidae. It is found in the Lake Victoria basin, the Lake Albert basin, the Sio River and near Ahero in Kenya, Tanzania, and Uganda. Its natural habitats are rivers, intermittent rivers, swamps, and intermittent freshwater marshes. This species was described in 1935 by Ernst Ahl from types collected in northwestern Tanzania.
