= Nothobranchius skeltoni =

Conservation status
- Vulnerable (IUCN 3.1)

Scientific classification
- Kingdom: Animalia
- Phylum: Chordata
- Class: Actinopterygii
- Order: Cyprinodontiformes
- Family: Nothobranchiidae
- Genus: Nothobranchius
- Species: N. skeltoni

Binomial name
- Nothobranchius skeltoni Watters, Nagy & Bellstedt, 2019

Species of fish

Nothobranchius skeltoni is a species of seasonal cyprinodontiform fish in the family Nothobranchiidae. This species is endemic to seasonal freshwater habitats in northwestern Tanzania.
