= Nothobranchius annectens =

Conservation status
- Near Threatened (IUCN 3.1)

Scientific classification
- Kingdom: Animalia
- Phylum: Chordata
- Class: Actinopterygii
- Order: Cyprinodontiformes
- Family: Nothobranchiidae
- Genus: Nothobranchius
- Species: N. annectens

Binomial name
- Nothobranchius annectens Watters, Wildekamp & B. J. Cooper, 1998

Species of fish

Nothobranchius annectens is a species of fish in the family Nothobranchiidae. It is endemic to Tanzania. Its natural habitats is weedy pools.

== Links ==
- Nothobranchius annectens on WildNothos
