= Nothobranchius sonjae =

Conservation status
- Least Concern (IUCN 3.1)

Scientific classification
- Kingdom: Animalia
- Phylum: Chordata
- Class: Actinopterygii
- Order: Cyprinodontiformes
- Family: Nothobranchiidae
- Genus: Nothobranchius
- Species: N. sonjae

Binomial name
- Nothobranchius sonjae Watters, Nagy & Bellstedt, 2019

Species of fish

Nothobranchius sonjae is a species of seasonal cyprinodontiform fish in the family Nothobranchiidae. This species is endemic to seasonal freshwater habitats in central and western Tanzania.
