= Togo killifish =

Conservation status
- Least Concern (IUCN 3.1)

Scientific classification
- Kingdom: Animalia
- Phylum: Chordata
- Class: Actinopterygii
- Division: Teleostei
- Order: Cyprinodontiformes
- Family: Nothobranchiidae
- Genus: Fundulosoma
- Species: F. thierryi

Binomial name
- Fundulosoma thierryi C. G. E. Ahl, 1924

Synonyms
- Nothobranchius thierryi (Ahl, 1924)

Species of fish

Fundulosoma thierryi, also known as the Togo killifish, is a species of fish in the family Nothobranchiidae found in Western Africa. This species is classified as the only member of the monospecific genus Fundulosoma but retained in Nothobranchius by some authorities.
