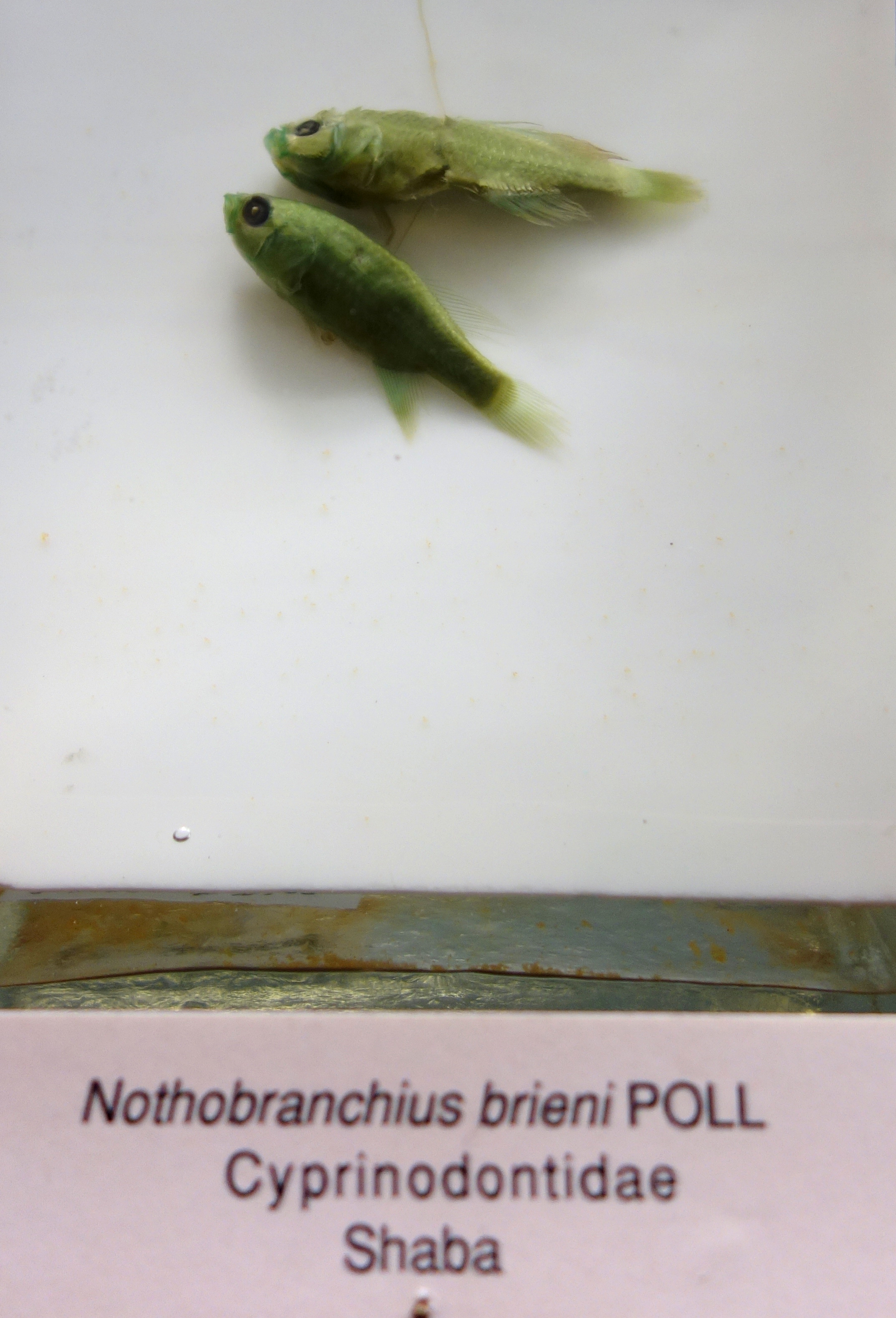

Conservation status
- Vulnerable (IUCN 3.1)

Scientific classification
- Kingdom: Animalia
- Phylum: Chordata
- Class: Actinopterygii
- Order: Cyprinodontiformes
- Family: Nothobranchiidae
- Genus: Nothobranchius
- Species: N. brieni

Binomial name
- Nothobranchius brieni Poll, 1938

= Nothobranchius brieni =

Species of fish

Nothobranchius brieni is a species of brightly colored fish in the family Nothobranchiidae. It is endemic to freshwater habitats in the south-eastern parts of the Democratic Republic of the Congo.

== Description and habitat ==
Adult males reach a length of about 60 mm, but the females are slightly smaller. The species is a semi-annual killifish. They inhabit ephemeral pools filled by rainwater during the monsoon season, being adapted to the alteration of dry and wet seasons. As with all members of the genus Nothobranchius, they show extreme life-history adaptations: their embryos survive by entering a three or four month long diapause, within eggs that have a very hard chorion and are resistant to desiccation and hypoxia. When the habitats dry up, the adult fish die and the eggs survive encased in the clay during the dry season.

== Type locality and type material ==
The type locality is stated as "Bukama, Shaba province, southeastern Zaïre (09° 12Ž S-25° 51Ž E)". The lectotype of the taxon is reposited as "MRAC 50016" at the Royal Museum for Central Africa in Tervuren, Belgium, together with 23 paratypes. The type was collected by the Belgian zoologist and colleague of Max Poll, Paul Brien (1894-1975), who is honoured in its specific name.

== See also ==
- Hypoxia in fish

== Links ==
- Nothobranchius brieni on WildNothos
- "Nothobranchius brieni". Integrated Taxonomic Information System.
