= Nothobranchius katemomandai =

Conservation status
- Vulnerable (IUCN 3.1)

Scientific classification
- Kingdom: Animalia
- Phylum: Chordata
- Class: Actinopterygii
- Order: Cyprinodontiformes
- Family: Nothobranchiidae
- Genus: Nothobranchius
- Species: N. katemomandai

Binomial name
- Nothobranchius katemomandai Nagy, 2025

Species of fish

Nothobranchius katemomandai is a species of seasonal cyprinodontiform fish in the family Nothobranchiidae. This species is endemic to seasonal freshwater habitats in southeastern Democratic Republic of the Congo.

== Links ==
- Nothobranchius katemomandai on WildNothos - various information and photographs of this species
