= Striped nothobranch =

Conservation status
- Vulnerable (IUCN 3.1)

Scientific classification
- Kingdom: Animalia
- Phylum: Chordata
- Class: Actinopterygii
- Order: Cyprinodontiformes
- Family: Nothobranchiidae
- Genus: Nothobranchius
- Species: N. taeniopygus

Binomial name
- Nothobranchius taeniopygus Hilgendorf, 1891

Synonyms
- Fundulus taeniopygus (Hilgendorf, 1891)

Species of fish

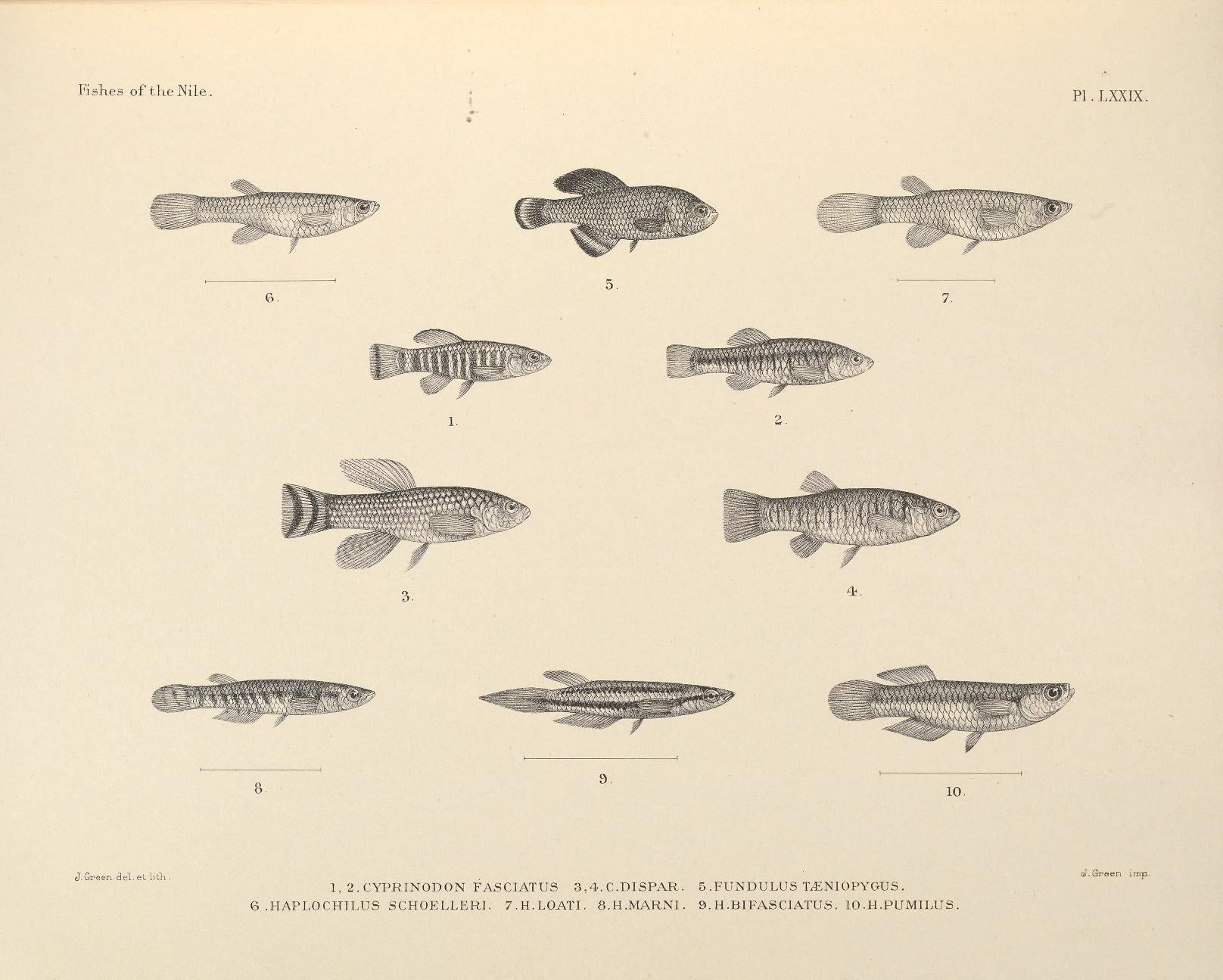
1. Aphanius fasciatus, 2. Aphanius dispar, 3+4. Nothobranchius taeniopygus, 5. Micropanchax loati, 6. Epiplatys spilargyreius, 7. Epiplatys bifasciatus, 8. Lacustricola pumilus

The striped nothobranch (Nothobranchius taeniopygus) is a species of freshwater fish of East Africa, belonging to the family Aplocheilidae.

The maximum recorded total length of the striped notobranch is 5.5 cm (2.2 in). Males are readily recognised by their bold blackish scale rims, and anal and caudal fins which have a black margin with a lighter band below. This type of colour pattern is not found in other Nothobranchius. Females are undistinguished and resemble those of congeners. The anal and dorsal fins of the striped nothobranch have no spines, but, respectively, 16-18 and 11-17 soft rays.

== Range and ecology ==
N. taeniopygus is found in central Tanzania and southern Uganda, and perhaps southwestern Kenya. It has been introduced to other places in its native countries, and probably also Zambia. Earlier it was believed to occur in Burundi also, but this is quite doubtful. This killifish's native range are the drainage basins of Lake Kyoga and Victoria, and the Aswa, Bubu and Malagarasi River.

Its natural habitats are rivers, swamps, freshwater lakes and marshes, temporary pools, floodplains and inland deltas. It can inhabit fairly cool (for its tropical range) water, with a temperature of 18–24 °C (64–75 °F), but it must be very eurythermic as the small pools and puddles it usually inhabits will heat up rapidly during the day and cool down just as rapidly at night. The pH in its habitat has been measured at 8.2 (somewhat alkaline) and the water hardness at 6° dH (rather soft), but this may not be indicative of its preferences and tolerance as very little data exists. A small carnivore, it feeds on aquatic invertebrates, mainly insect larvae and crustaceans. Like its relatives, it is semelparous and spawns in the dry season. The eggs are deposited in the substrate, and the parents then die, as the small waterbodies which they inhabit would mostly dry up anyway. The eggs are adapted to surviving the drying-up in diapause, and can even be entirely outside the water for a time, as long as the substrate is still moist. They hatch after 3–5 months.

It is not considered a threatened species by the IUCN. Locally, populations may disappear after habitat destruction and water pollution by agriculture. On the other hand, it is very widespread and resilient, and to some degree used for mosquito control in and around its native range. It is sometimes found as an aquarium fish, but unlike some other Nothobranchius, it is difficult to keep as its requirements are still insufficiently known.

== Taxonomy ==
The notobranchs were formerly included in the family Aplocheilidae, but they are not as closely related to Aplocheilus as was long believed.

The IUCN Red List gives Astatotilapia stappersii as a junior synonym of N. taeniopygus, but this is a lapsus; A. stappersii is a cichlid, not notobranch, and the IUCN indeed has a separate entry for it (under the name Haplochromis stappersii).

N. taeniopygus was described by Franz Martin Hilgendorf in 1891 with the type locality being given as residual pools in Kaputa creek, which is about 5 kilometres (3.1 miles) east of the railway station at Kazi Kazi in Tanzania.
