= Nothobranchius nikiforovi =

Conservation status
- Vulnerable (IUCN 3.1)

Scientific classification
- Kingdom: Animalia
- Phylum: Chordata
- Class: Actinopterygii
- Division: Teleostei
- Order: Cyprinodontiformes
- Family: Nothobranchiidae
- Genus: Nothobranchius
- Species: N. nikiforovi

Binomial name
- Nothobranchius nikiforovi Nagy, Watters & Raspopova, 2021

Species of fish

Nothobranchius nikiforovi is a species of seasonal cyprinodontiform fish in the family Nothobranchiidae. This species is endemic to seasonal freshwater habitats in eastern Tanzania.

== Links ==
- Nothobranchius nikiforovi on WildNothos - various information and photographs of this species
