= Nothobranchius sylvaticus =

Conservation status
- Critically Endangered (IUCN 3.1)

Scientific classification
- Kingdom: Animalia
- Phylum: Chordata
- Class: Actinopterygii
- Division: Teleostei
- Order: Cyprinodontiformes
- Family: Nothobranchiidae
- Genus: Nothobranchius
- Species: N. sylvaticus

Binomial name
- Nothobranchius sylvaticus Nagy, Bellstedt & Luke, 2025

Species of fish

Nothobranchius sylvaticus is a species of seasonal cyprinodontiform fish in the family Nothobranchiidae. This species is endemic to seasonal freshwater habitats in southeastern Kenya.
