= Nothobranchius rungwaensis =

Conservation status
- Vulnerable (IUCN 3.1)

Scientific classification
- Kingdom: Animalia
- Phylum: Chordata
- Class: Actinopterygii
- Order: Cyprinodontiformes
- Family: Nothobranchiidae
- Genus: Nothobranchius
- Species: N. rungwaensis

Binomial name
- Nothobranchius rungwaensis Watters, Nagy & Bellstedt, 2019

Species of fish

Nothobranchius rungwaensis is a species of seasonal cyprinodontiform fish in the family Nothobranchiidae. This species is endemic to seasonal freshwater habitats in southwestern Tanzania.
