= Nimbapanchax =

Scientific classification
- Domain: Eukaryota
- Kingdom: Animalia
- Phylum: Chordata
- Class: Actinopterygii
- Order: Cyprinodontiformes
- Family: Nothobranchiidae
- Genus: Nimbapanchax; Sonnenberg & Busch, 2009

Type species
- Nimbapanchax leucopterygius Sonnenberg & Busch, 2009

Genus of fishes

Nimbapanchax is a genus of African rivulines, fish endemic to freshwaters in tropical West Africa.

== Species ==
There are currently five recognized species in this genus:

- Nimbapanchax jeanpoli (Berkenkamp & Etzel, 1979) (Jeanpol's killi)
- Nimbapanchax leucopterygius Sonnenberg & Busch, 2009
- Nimbapanchax melanopterygius Sonnenberg & Busch, 2009
- Nimbapanchax petersi (Sauvage, 1882)
- Nimbapanchax viridis (Ladiges & Roloff, 1973)
