= Blackspotted nothobranch =

Conservation status
- Least Concern (IUCN 3.1)

Scientific classification
- Kingdom: Animalia
- Phylum: Chordata
- Class: Actinopterygii
- Order: Cyprinodontiformes
- Family: Nothobranchiidae
- Genus: Nothobranchius
- Species: N. melanospilus

Binomial name
- Nothobranchius melanospilus (Pfeffer, 1896)

Species of fish

The blackspotted nothobranch (Nothobranchius melanospilus) is a species of fish in the family Nothobranchiidae. It is found in Kenya and Tanzania. Its natural habitats are temporary pools and floodplains, rice fields, swamps, ditches, and small streams. It grows to 7.5 cm (3.0 in) total length.
