= Episemion =

Scientific classification
- Domain: Eukaryota
- Kingdom: Animalia
- Phylum: Chordata
- Class: Actinopterygii
- Order: Cyprinodontiformes
- Family: Nothobranchiidae
- Genus: Episemion; Sonnenberg, Blum & Misof, 2006
- Species: E. krystallinoron

Binomial name
- Episemion krystallinoron Sonnenberg, Blum & Misof, 2006

Species of fish

Episemion krystallinoron is a species of African rivuline native to Equatorial Guinea and Gabon.
