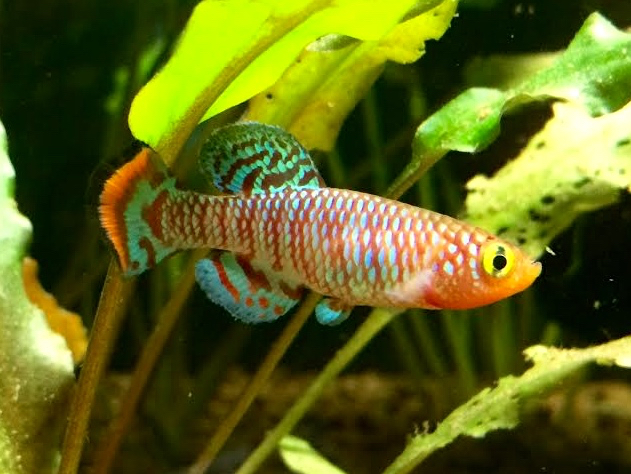
- Adult male
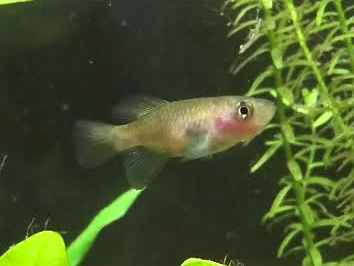
- Adult female

Conservation status
- Least Concern (IUCN 3.1)

Scientific classification
- Kingdom: Animalia
- Phylum: Chordata
- Class: Actinopterygii
- Order: Cyprinodontiformes
- Family: Nothobranchiidae
- Genus: Nothobranchius
- Species: N. rachovii

Binomial name
- Nothobranchius rachovii Ahl, 1926

Synonyms
- Adiniops rachovii (Ahl, 1926)

= Nothobranchius rachovii =

Species of fish

Nothobranchius rachovii, the bluefin notho, is a species of freshwater annual killifish from Mozambique. It can grow up to 6 cm (2.4"). It is popular among killifish enthusiasts, who raise them from eggs in aquaria.

== Description ==
Aside from the typical orange and blue variant, there is Nothobranchius rachovii KNP Black. which has much darker colors, and was collected from the wild in Kruger National Park, South Africa, in 1984, and Nothobranchius rachovii "Red", which has a red head with turquoise highlights. The females of all varieties are more neutrally colored. This shows sexual dimorphism among these fish.

== Distribution ==
Nothobranchius rachovii sensu stricto is found in the floodplain of the lower Zambezi and also in the floodplain of the Pungwe River.

== Diet ==
N. rachovii are benthopelagic, feeding on zooplankton and other small organisms living at the bottom of the water (benthos).

== Habitat ==
N. rachovii are naturally found in flat plains or water depressions that dry up annually. Like other benthopelagic fish, N. rachovii prefer to stay at the bottom of the water, right above the benthic zone. They lay their eggs in mud as the water level decreases, which preserves them until the water returns.

== Reproduction and life cycle ==
Bluefin nothos mature in about twelve weeks, live for up to a year or year and a half, then die at the end of the breeding season- which is why they are called "annual" killifish. They are able to have offspring by burying their eggs in the river/ lake bed before their habitat dries up- they live in temporary pools dependent on rainfall. These eggs develop while buried in the mud and then hatch once the pools are refilled with water from rainfall.

== In the aquarium ==
N. rachovii are of commercial importance, being commonly found in the pet trade. They can be housed in a 40–60 litre (10–15 gallons) aquarium. Males are aggressive toward other males of the same species. They can be kept in a community tank of similar-sized peaceful freshwater tropical fish, including pencil fish, Corrydora, khuli loaches, knight goby and peacock gudgeon. They thrive in a heavily planted tank and prefer soft water conditions.

== Naming ==
Nothobranchius rachovii was described by Ernst Ahl in 1926 with the type locality given as Beira, Mozambique. The genus name Nothobranchius comes from Ancient Greek νόθος (nóthos), meaning 'crossbred', and βράγχια (bránkhia), meaning 'gill'. The specific name honours the German aquarist Arthur Rachow (1884–1960), who donated a number of fish specimens to the Museum für Naturkunde.
