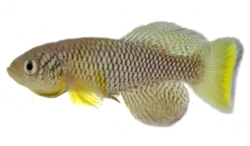
- Male Nothobranchius furzeri GRZ (from Gonarezhou National Park)

Conservation status
- Least Concern (IUCN 3.1)

Scientific classification
- Kingdom: Animalia
- Phylum: Chordata
- Class: Actinopterygii
- Division: Teleostei
- Order: Cyprinodontiformes
- Family: Nothobranchiidae
- Genus: Nothobranchius
- Species: N. furzeri

Binomial name
- Nothobranchius furzeri R. A. Jubb, 1971

= Nothobranchius furzeri =

Turquoise killifish

Species of fish

Nothobranchius furzeri, the turquoise killifish, is a species of killifish from the family Nothobranchiidae native to Africa where it is only known from Zimbabwe and Mozambique. This annual killifish inhabits ephemeral pools in semi-arid areas with scarce and erratic precipitations and have adapted to the routine drying of their environment by evolving desiccation-resistant eggs that can remain dormant in the dry mud for one and maybe more years by entering into diapause.

Among vertebrates, the species has the fastest known sexual maturity – only 14 days after hatching. Due to very short duration of the rain season, the natural lifespan of these animals is limited to a few months and their captive lifespan is likewise short. More specifically, they are able to live 1–5 months in the wild (with most only living up to 2 months) and 3 to 16 months in captivity depending on the strain and environment. Turquoise killifish are the shortest-lived vertebrate kept in captivity making them an attractive model system for ageing and disease research. Tandem repeats comprise 21% of the species' genome, an abnormally high proportion, which has been suggested as a factor in its fast ageing. Their captive diet consists mostly of bloodworms and there are ongoing efforts to replace bloodworms by pelleted diets. Recent advancements in captive nutrition led to the development of a synthetic diet, enabling researchers to assess the importance of caloric and protein restriction on the organism's actuarial ageing.

This species can reach a total length of 6.5 cm (2.6 in).

The species name is derived from that of the discoverer Richard E. Furzer of Rhodesia.

N. furzeri is a common model organism used to study aging.
