= Likangala River =

River in Malawi

Coordinates: 15°25′S 35°36′E

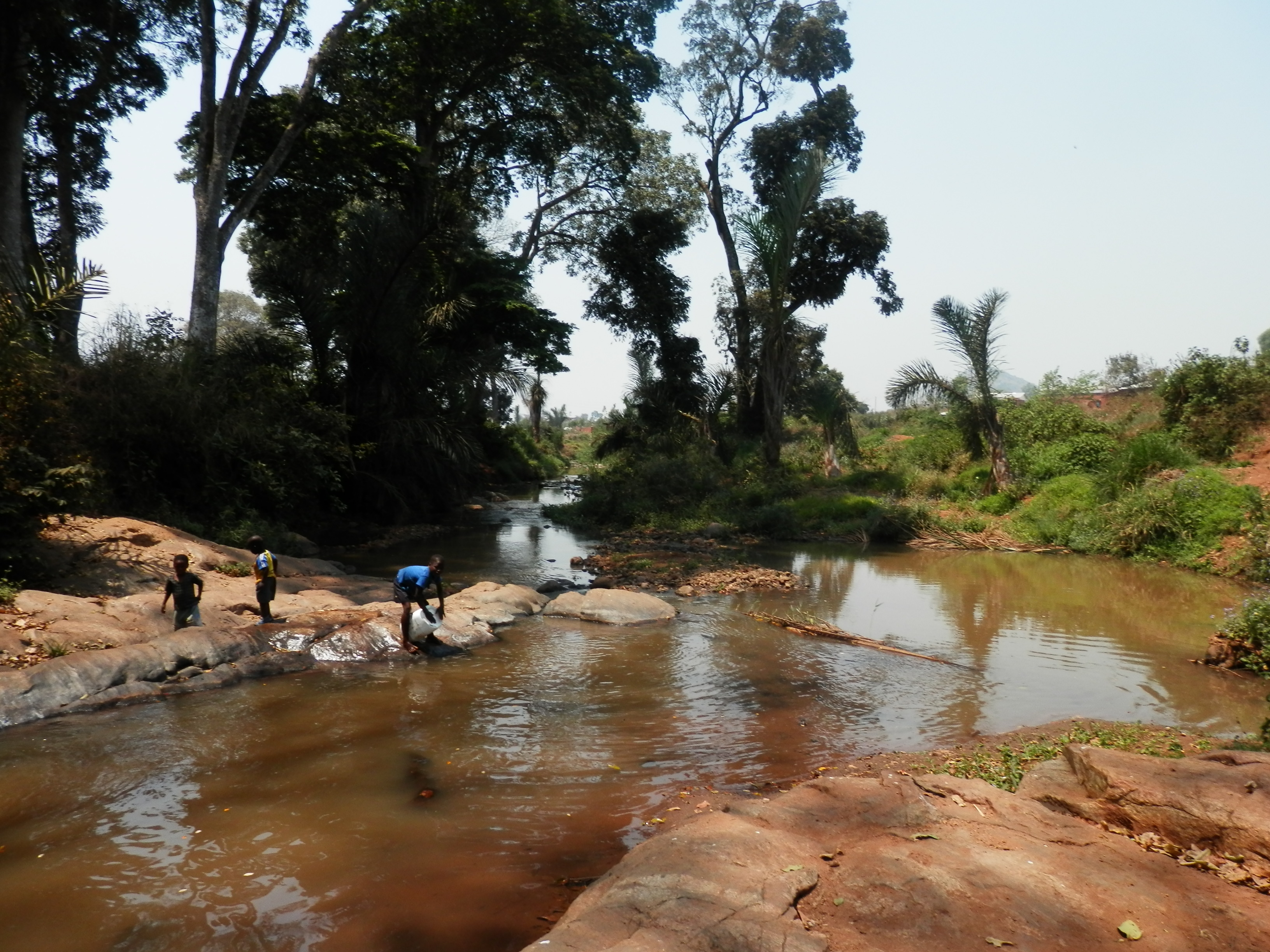
Children collect water on the stretch of the Likangala River that flows through Zomba.

The Likangala River originates at Zomba mountain in southern Malawi and flows through both urban and rural areas before it flows into Lake Chilwa, a wetland of international significance being a UNESCO Biodiversity Reserve and Ramsar site.

The river has a length of 50 km and flows along varying topography between elevations of 1265 m and 790 m above sea level. Its catchment covers 756 km^{2}.

It is an important river providing water for domestic uses and irrigation. It is also the river that provides water for the Likangala Rice Irrigation scheme which was established in 1969, which caters to about 200 farmers and covers an area of 415 ha in size. Communities living in the catchment benefit from many provisioning services including wild foods, reeds, sand, stone, fish and wood. Water quality of the Likangala varies along its length, and point and non-point sources of pollution impact on it. Where it passes by the city Zomba, effluent from the waste water treatment plans joins the river causing discolorations and algae growth.
