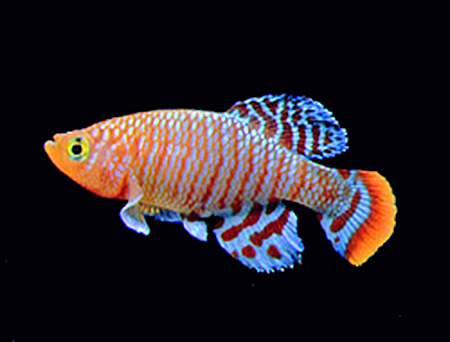
- Nothobranchius rachovii

Scientific classification
- Kingdom: Animalia
- Phylum: Chordata
- Class: Actinopterygii
- Division: Teleostei
- Order: Cyprinodontiformes
- Family: Nothobranchiidae
- Genus: Nothobranchius; Peters, 1868

Type species
- Cyprinodon orthonotus (Peters, 1844)

Synonyms
- Adiniops Myers, 1924; Fundulosoma Ahl, 1924; Zononothobranchius Radda, 1969; Aphyobranchius Wildekamp, 1977; Paranothobranchius Seegers, 1985

= Nothobranchius =

Genus of fishes

Nothobranchius, known as nothobranchs or simply nothos, is a genus of small, freshwater killifish, classified in the family Nothobranchiidae in the order Cyprinodontiformes. There are about a hundred species in the genus, many with very small distributions. They are primarily native to East Africa from Sudan to northern South Africa, whereas a dozen species are found in the upper Congo River Basin, with the greatest species richness being in Tanzania.

Nothobranchius typically inhabit ephemeral pools that are filled only during the monsoon season, and show extreme life-history adaptations to survive the dry season. When their habitats dry up, the adult fish die and the eggs survive encased in the clay during the dry season. The embryos survive the dry season by entering diapause, facilitated by their specialized eggs that have a very hard chorion and are resistant to desiccation and hypoxia. These species reach maturity very quickly once diapause is broken and have a very short life span; one species, Nothobranchius furzeri, reaches maturity in 17 days and seldom lives beyond 6 months.

== Etymology ==
The genus name Nothobranchius comes from Ancient Greek νόθος (nóthos), meaning 'crossbred', and βράγχιος (bránkhios), meaning 'with gills'.

== Species ==
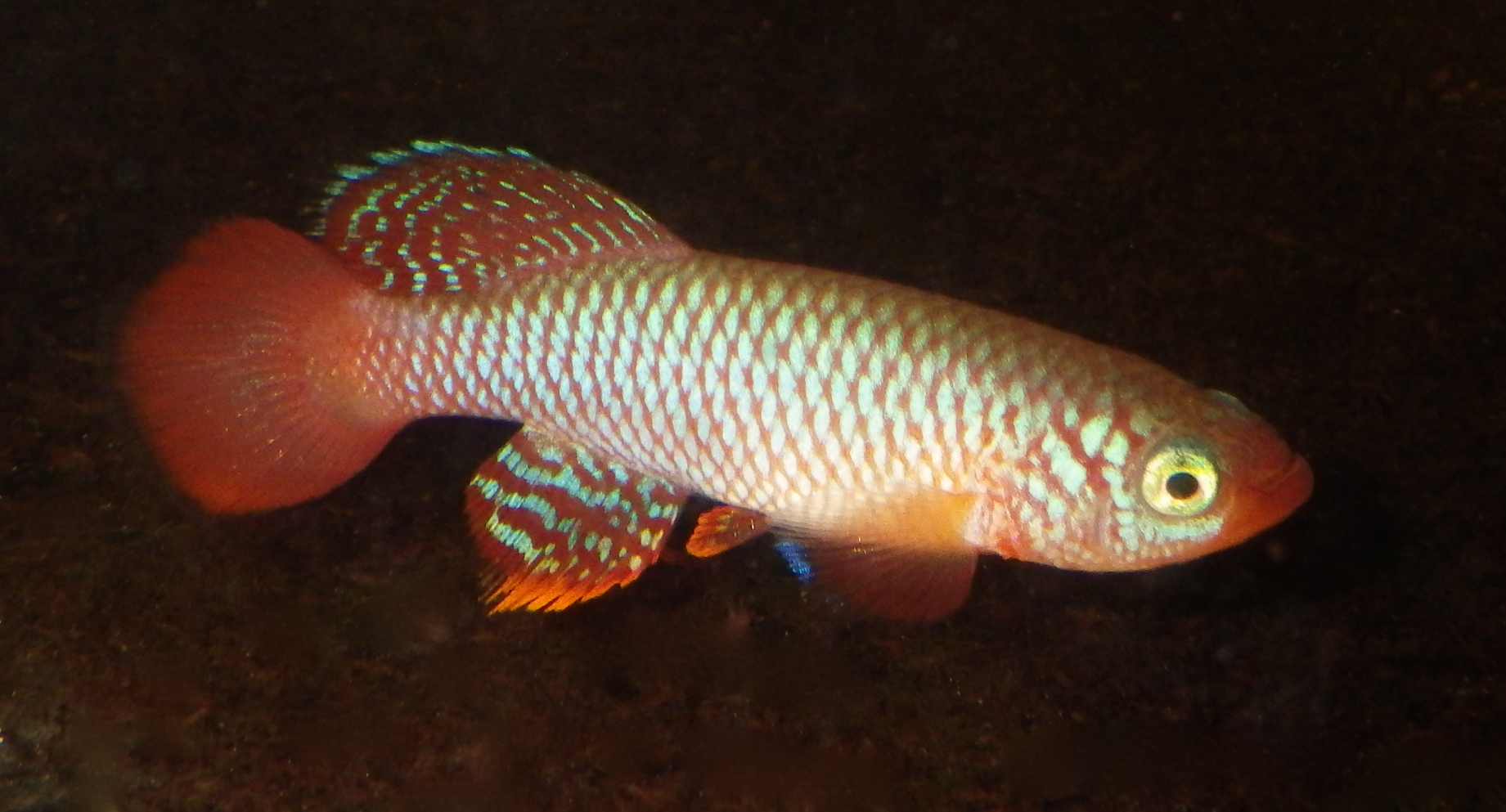
Nothobranchius flammicomantis, male

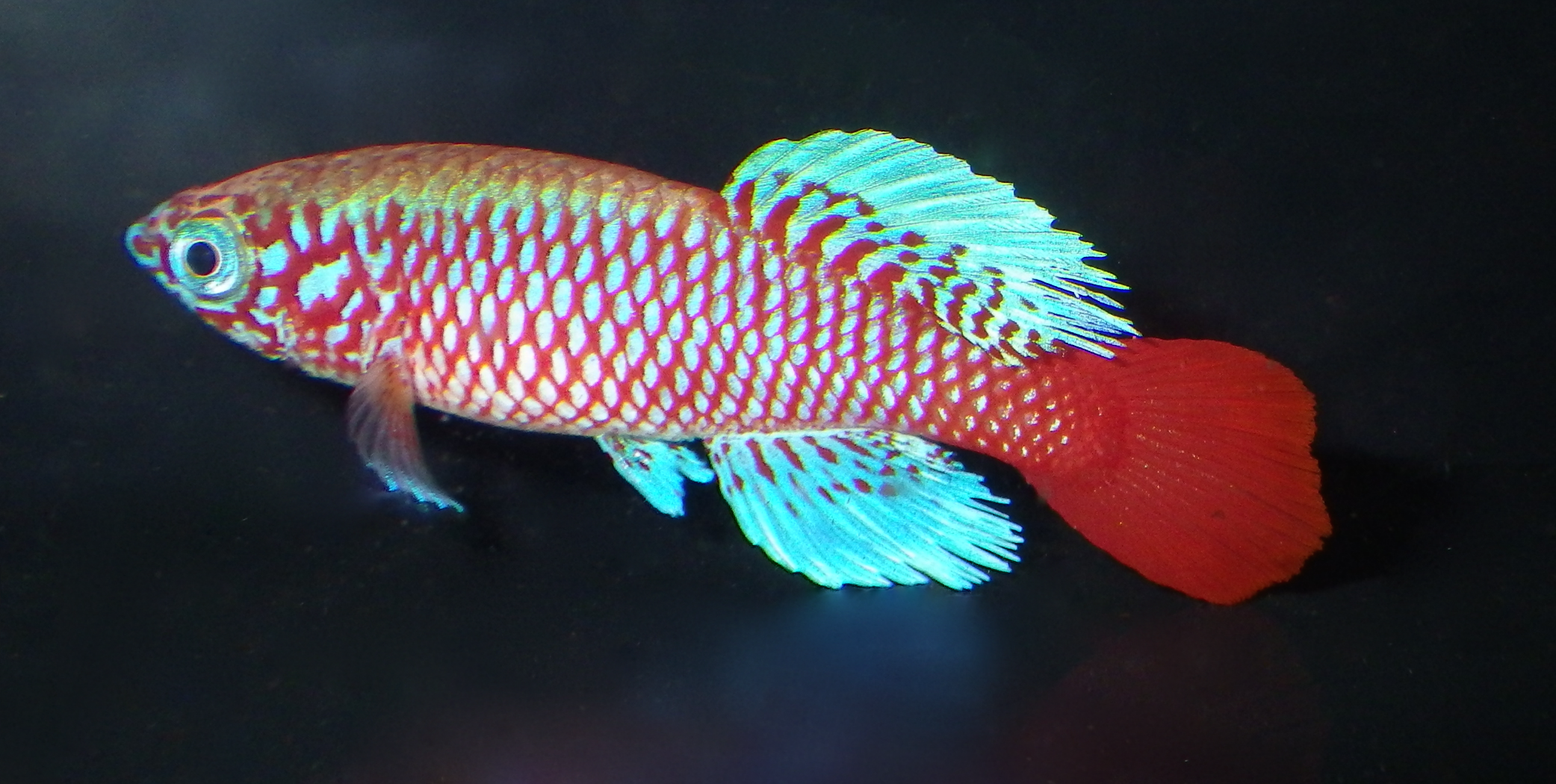
Nothobranchius kilomberoensis, male

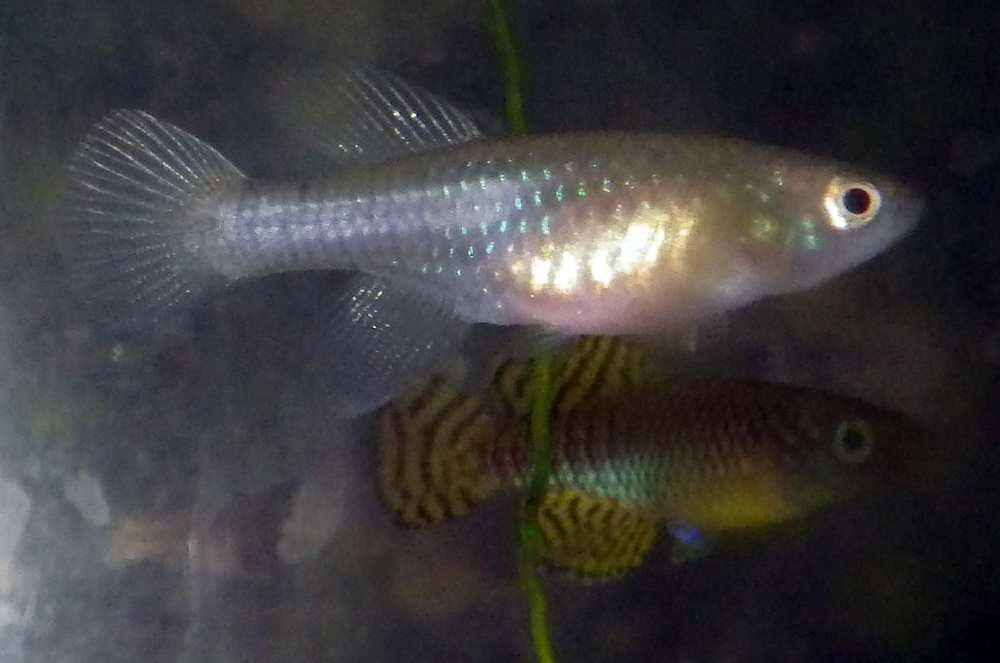
Nothobranchius korthausae pair, female in foreground

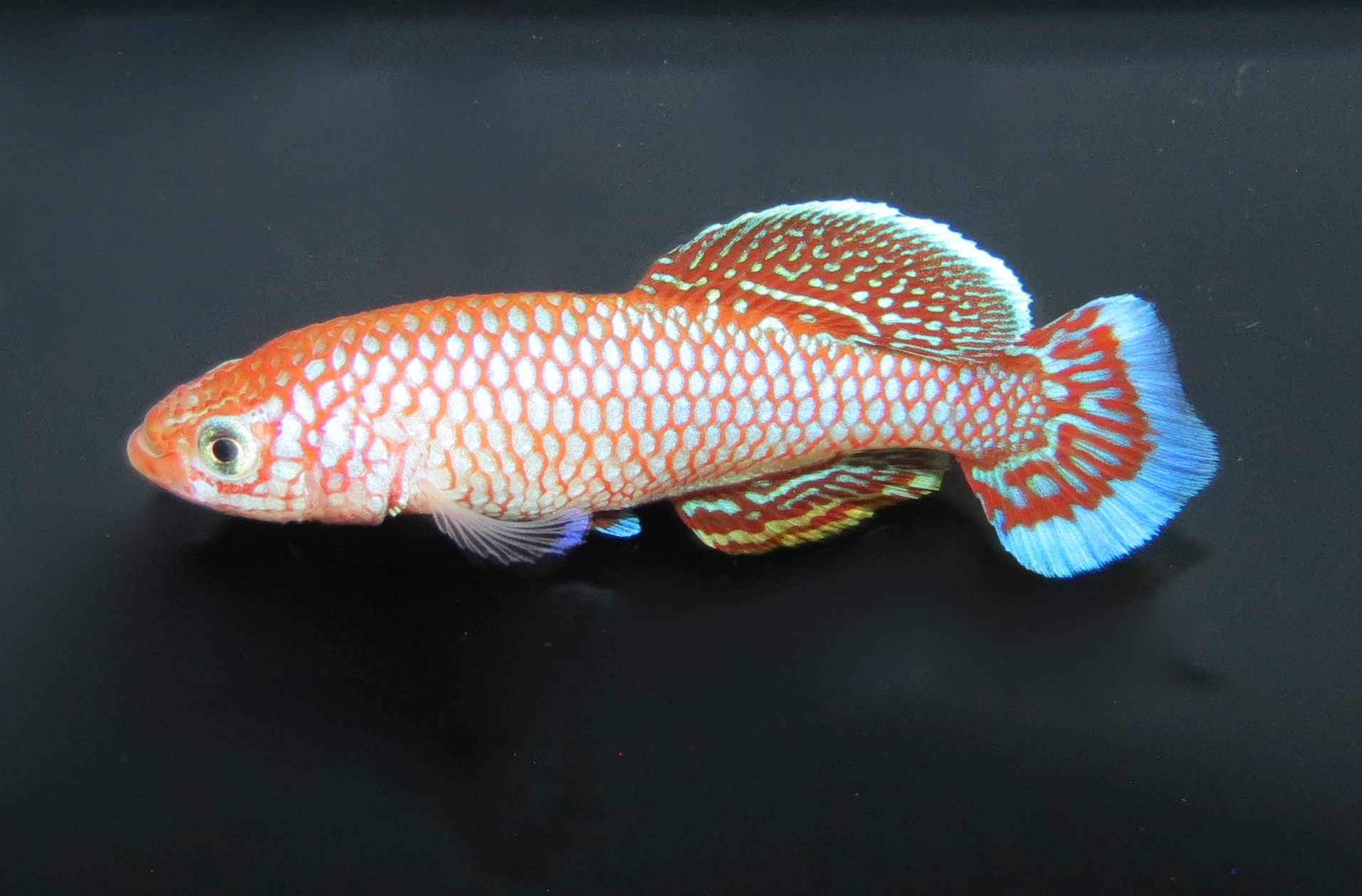
Nothobranchius polli, male

There are 102 recognized species in this genus:

- Nothobranchius albertinensis Nagy, Watters & Bellstedt, 2020
- Nothobranchius albimarginatus Watters, Wildekamp & Cooper, 1998
- Nothobranchius angelae Watters, Nagy & Bellstedt, 2019
- Nothobranchius annectens Watters, Wildekamp & Cooper, 1998
- Nothobranchius attenboroughi Nagy, Watters & Bellstedt, 2020
- Nothobranchius balamaensis Bragança & Chakona, 2022
- Nothobranchius bellemansi Valdesalici, 2014
- Nothobranchius bojiensis Wildekamp & Haas, 1992 (Boji Plains nothobranch)
- Nothobranchius boklundi Valdesalici, 2010
- Nothobranchius brieni Poll, 1938
- Nothobranchius capriviensis Watters, Wildekamp & Shidlovskiy, 2015 (Caprivi nothobranch)
- Nothobranchius cardinalis Watters, Cooper & Wildekamp, 2008 (cardinal nothobranch)
- Nothobranchius chochamandai Nagy, 2014
- Nothobranchius cooperi Nagy, Watters & Bellstedt, 2017
- Nothobranchius derhami Valdesalici & Amato, 2019
- Nothobranchius ditte Nagy, 2018
- Nothobranchius dubieensis Nagy, 2025
- Nothobranchius eggersi Seegers, 1982
- Nothobranchius elongatus Wildekamp, 1982 (elongate nothobranch)
- Nothobranchius elucens Nagy, 2021
- Nothobranchius fasciatus Wildekamp & Haas, 1992
- Nothobranchius flagrans Nagy, 2014
- Nothobranchius flammicomantis Wildekamp, Watters & Sainthouse, 1998
- Nothobranchius foerschi Wildekamp & Berkenkamp, 1979
- Nothobranchius furzeri Jubb, 1971 (turquoise killifish)
- Nothobranchius fuscotaeniatus Seegers, 1997
- Nothobranchius geminus Wildekamp, Watters & Sainthouse, 2002
- Nothobranchius guentheri (Pfeffer, 1893) (red-tail nothobranch)
- Nothobranchius hassoni Valdesalici & Wildekamp, 2004
- Nothobranchius hengstleri Valdesalici, 2007
- Nothobranchius hoermanni Nagy, Watters & Bellstedt, 2020
- Nothobranchius insularis Costa, 2017
- Nothobranchius interruptus Wildekamp & Berkenkamp, 1979 (Kikambala nothobranchius)
- Nothobranchius iridescens Nagy, 2025
- Nothobranchius itigiensis Nagy, Watters & Bellstedt, 2020
- Nothobranchius ivanovae Valdesalici, 2012
- Nothobranchius janpapi Wildekamp, 1977
- Nothobranchius jubbi Wildekamp & Berkenkamp, 1979
- Nothobranchius kadleci Reichard, 2010
- Nothobranchius kafuensis Wildekamp & Rosenstock, 1989 (Kafue killifish)
- Nothobranchius kardashevi Valdesalici, 2012
- Nothobranchius katemomandai Nagy, 2025
- Nothobranchius kilomberoensis Wildekamp, Watters & Sainthouse, 2002
- Nothobranchius kirki Jubb, 1969 (Red-fin nothobranch)
- Nothobranchius korthausae Meinken, 1973
- Nothobranchius krammeri Valdesalici & Hengstler, 2008
- Nothobranchius krysanovi Shidlovskiy, Watters & Wildekamp, 2010
- Nothobranchius kwalensis W. J. E. M. Costa, 2019
- Nothobranchius lourensi Wildekamp, 1977
- Nothobranchius lucius Wildekamp, Shidlovskiy & Watters, 2009
- Nothobranchius luekei Seegers, 1984
- Nothobranchius makondorum Wildekamp, Shidlovskiy & Watters, 2009
- Nothobranchius malaissei Wildekamp, 1978
- Nothobranchius marmoreus Nagy, 2025
- Nothobranchius matanduensis Watters, Nagy & Bellstedt, 2020
- Nothobranchius melanospilus (Pfeffer, 1896) (black-spotted nothobranch)
- Nothobranchius microlepis (Vinciguerra, 1897) (small-scaled nothobranch)
- Nothobranchius milvertzi Nagy, 2014
- Nothobranchius mkuziensis (Fowler, 1934)
- Nothobranchius moameensis Nagy, Watters & Bellstedt, 2020
- Nothobranchius neumanni (Hilgendorf, 1905)
- Nothobranchius niassa Valdesalici, Bills, Dorn, Reichwald & Cellerino, 2012
- Nothobranchius nikiforovi Nagy, Watters & Raspopova, 2021
- Nothobranchius nubaensis Valdesalici, Bellemans, Kardashev & Golubtsov, 2009
- Nothobranchius occultus Valdesalici, 2014
- Nothobranchius ocellatus (Seegers, 1985)
- Nothobranchius oestergaardi Valdesalici & Amato, 2011
- Nothobranchius orthonotus (Peters, 1844) (spotted killifish)
- Nothobranchius ottoschmidti Watters, Nagy & Bellstedt, 2019
- Nothobranchius palmqvisti (Lönnberg, 1907)
- Nothobranchius patrizii (Vinciguerra, 1927) (blue nothobranch)
- Nothobranchius pienaari Shidlovskiy, Watters & Wildekamp, 2010
- Nothobranchius polli Wildekamp, 1978
- Nothobranchius poppi Nagy, Chocha Manda & Vreven, 2016
- Nothobranchius prognathus Costa, 2019
- Nothobranchius rachovii Ahl, 1926 (blue-fin nothobranch)
- Nothobranchius robustus Ahl, 1935 (red victoria nothobranch)
- Nothobranchius rosenstocki Valdesalici & Wildekamp, 2005
- Nothobranchius rubripinnis Seegers, 1986
- Nothobranchius rubroreticulatus Blache & Miton, 1960
- Nothobranchius rungwaensis Watters, Nagy & Bellstedt, 2019
- Nothobranchius ruudwildekampi Costa, 2009
- Nothobranchius sagittae Wildekamp, Watters & Shidlovskiy, 2014
- Nothobranchius sainthousei Nagy, Cotterill & Bellstedt, 2016
- Nothobranchius seegersi Valdesalici & Kardashev, 2011
- Nothobranchius serengetiensis Wildekamp, Watters & Shidlovskiy, 2014
- Nothobranchius skeltoni Watters, Nagy & Bellstedt, 2019
- Nothobranchius sonjae Watters, Nagy & Bellstedt, 2019
- Nothobranchius steinforti Wildekamp, 1977
- Nothobranchius streltsovi Valdesalici (sv), 2016
- Nothobranchius sylvaticus Nagy, Bellstedt & Luke, 2025
- Nothobranchius symoensi Wildekamp, 1978
- Nothobranchius taeniopygus Hilgendorf, 1891 (striped nothobranch)
- Nothobranchius taiti Nagy, 2019
- Nothobranchius torgashevi Valdesalici, 2015
- Nothobranchius ugandensis Wildekamp, 1994 (Uganda nothobranch)
- Nothobranchius usanguensis Wildekamp, Watters & Shidlovskiy, 2014
- Nothobranchius venustus Nagy, Watters & Bellstedt, 2020
- Nothobranchius virgatus Chambers, 1984
- Nothobranchius vosseleri Ahl, 1924 (Pangani nothobranch)
- Nothobranchius wattersi Ng'oma, Valdesalici, Reichwald & Cellerino, 2013
- Nothobranchius willerti Wildekamp, 1992 (Mnanzini nothobranch)
