= Killifish =

Any of various oviparous cyprinodontiform fish

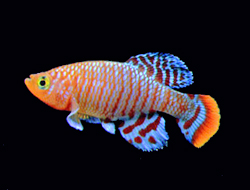
A bluefin notho killifish, Nothobranchius rachovii, from East Africa

A killifish is any of various oviparous (egg-laying) cyprinodontiform fish, including families Aplocheilidae, Pantanodontidae, Cyprinodontidae, Fundulidae, Nothobranchiidae, Profundulidae, Aphaniidae and Valenciidae. All together, there are 1,270 species of killifish, the biggest family being Rivulidae, containing more than 320 species. As an adaptation to living in ephemeral waters, the eggs of most killifish can survive periods of partial dehydration. Many of the species rely on such a diapause, since the eggs would not survive more than a few weeks if entirely submerged in water. The adults of some species, such as Kryptolebias marmoratus, can additionally survive out of the water for several weeks. Most killifish are small, measuring from 2.5 to 5 centimetres (1 to 2 in), with the largest species growing to just under 15 centimetres (6 in).

The word killifish is of uncertain origin, but is likely to have come from the Dutch kil for a kill (small stream). Although killifish is sometimes used as an English equivalent to the taxonomical term Cyprinodontidae, this is only one of several families that are referred to as killifish. Cyprinodontidae more specifically refers to the pupfish family.

== Range and habitat ==
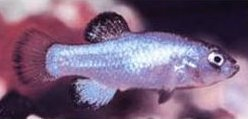
Devils Hole pupfish, Cyprinodon diabolis, from Death Valley National Park

Killifish are found mainly in fresh or brackish waters in the Americas, as far south as Argentina and as far north as southern Ontario and even Newfoundland and Labrador. There are also species in southern Europe, in much of Africa as far south as KwaZulu-Natal, South Africa, in the Middle East and Asia (as far east as Vietnam), and on several Indian Ocean islands.

The majority of killifish are found in permanent streams, rivers, and lakes, and live between two and three years. Such killifish are common in the Americas (Cyprinodon, Fundulus and Rivulus) as well as in Africa and Asia (including Aphyosemion, Aplocheilus, Epiplatys, Fundulopanchax and Lacustricola) and southern Europe (Aphanius). Some of these habitats can be rather extreme; the only natural habitat of the Devils Hole pupfish (Cyprinodon diabolis) is Devils Hole: a cavern at least 91 metres (299 ft) deep, branching out from a small opening at the surface, approximately 1.8 metres (6 ft) by 5.5 metres (18 ft) wide.

Some specialized forms live in temporary ponds and flood plains, and typically have a much shorter lifespan. Such species, known as "annuals", live no longer than nine months, and are used as models for studies on aging. Examples include the African genus Nothobranchius and South American genera ranging from the cold water Austrolebias of Argentina and Uruguay to the more tropical Gnatholebias, Pterolebias, Simpsonichthys and Terranatos.

== Territorial behaviour ==
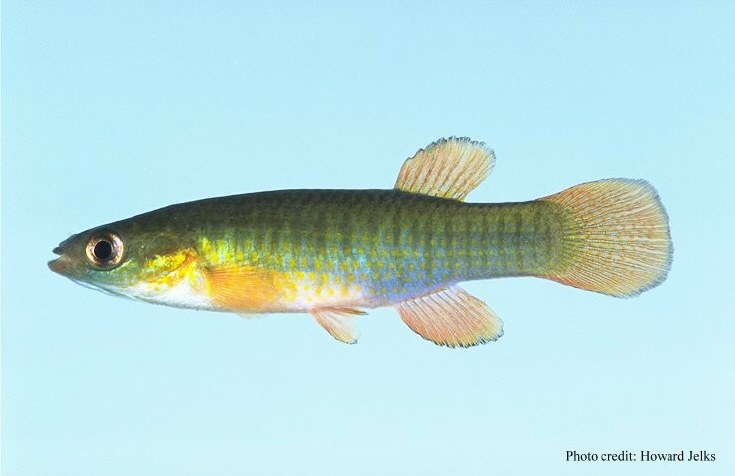
Fundulus auroguttatus, a non-annual North American killifish similar to Fundulus chrysotus known as a topminnow

A small number of species will shoal while most are territorial to varying degrees. Populations can be dense and territories can shift quickly, especially for species of the extreme shallows (a few centimetres of water). Many species exist as passive tribes in small streams where dominant males will defend a territory while allowing females and immature males to pass through the area. In the aquarium, territorial behaviour is different for every grouping, and will even vary by individuals. In a large enough aquarium, most species can live in groups as long as there are more than three males.

== Diet ==
Killifish feed primarily on aquatic arthropods such as insect (mosquito) larvae, aquatic crustaceans and worms. Some species of Orestias from Lake Titicaca are planktonic filter feeders. Others, such as Cynolebias and Megalebias species and Nothobranchius ocellatus are predatory and feed mainly on other fish. The American Flagfish (Jordanella floridae) feeds heavily on algae and other plant matter as well as aquatic invertebrates. Nothobranchius furzeri needs much food because it grows quickly, so when food supplied is inadequate, bigger fish will eat the smaller fish.

== In lifespan research ==
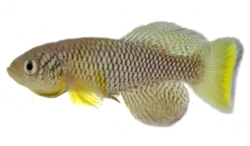
A male Nothobranchius furzeri GRZ (from Gonarezhou National Park)

Some strains have a lifespan as short as several months and can thus serve as a model for biogerontological studies. The African turquoise killifish (Nothobranchius furzeri) is the shortest-living vertebrate that can be bred in captivity, having a lifespan of between three and nine months. Sexual maturation occurs within 3–4 weeks, with fecundity peaking in 8–10 weeks.

Nothobranchius furzeri shows no signs of telomere shortening, reduced telomerase activity, or replicative senescence with age, despite its short lifespan. Nonetheless, lipofuscin accumulates in the brain and liver (associated with age-related neurodegeneration), and there is an increased risk of cancer with age. Calorie restriction reduces these age-related disease conditions. Resveratrol has been shown to increase the mean (56%) and maximum life span (59%) of Nothobranchius furzeri, but resveratrol has not been shown to have this effect in mammals.

Transferring the gut microbiota from young killifish into middle-aged killifish significantly extends the lifespans of the middle-aged killifish.

Transgenic strains have been made, and precise genome editing was achieved in Nothobranchius furzeri using a draft genome and the CRISPR/Cas9 system. By targeting multiple genes, including telomerase, the killifish can now be used as an attractive vertebrate model organism for aging and diseases (such as Dyskeratosis congenita). Sequencing the whole killifish genome indicated modification to the IGF-1 receptor gene.

== As pets ==
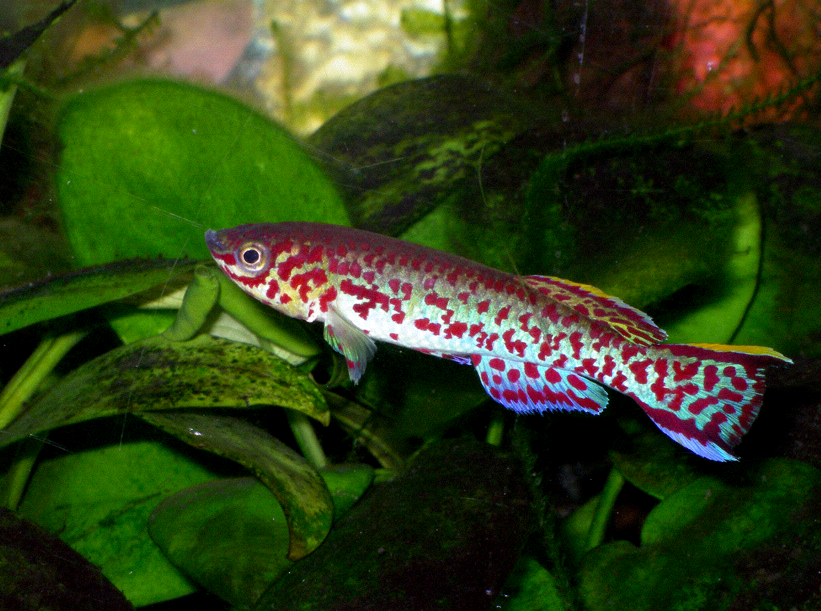
Blue lyretail, Fundulopanchax gardneri, one of the most common West African species of killifish kept in aquariums

Many killifish are lavishly coloured and most species are easy to keep and breed in an aquarium. Specimens can be obtained from specialist societies and associations. Striped panchax (also known as the Golden Wonder killifish) are commonly found in pet shops, but caution must be exercised when considering tank mates, since the mouth of the Striped panchax is as wide as the head, and much smaller fish will be eaten. Flagfish, native to south Florida, is another species of killifish commonly found in pet stores. They are useful in aquariums for algae control. The golden topminnow (Fundulus chrysotus) is also native to the United States and often available at auction, but care must be taken with these fish to stop them from jumping out of the tank. A firm cover and a layer of floating plants is best when keeping these fish.

In the 1960s, the American toy company Wham-O sold African killifish eggs, marketed as "instant fish", to be hatched in aquariums.

== Behaviour-altering infection ==
Normally, killifish avoid near-surface water to reduce the danger of being eaten by predators. However, when infected with a type of fluke the fish swim near the surface, and sometimes even swim upside down, exposing their camouflaged bellies. The fluke completes its lifecycle in the digestive tract of birds.

== Evolved resistance to extreme levels of toxicity ==
The large populations of killifish and the genetic diversity of the species have enabled it to evolve and survive in areas where other species have died out, including Superfund sites. Over a few dozen generations of killifish in a relatively short period of time (50–60 years), killifish have evolved resistance against levels of dioxins, PCBs, mercury, and other industrial chemicals up to 8,000 times higher than the previously estimated lethal dose. Sequencing the genomes of the adapted individuals showed a common set of mutations among the pollution-tolerant fish, many of which help to deactivate or turn off a molecular pathway responsible for a large part of the cellular damage caused by the chemicals.

Killifish were found to fare relatively well in the wake of the Deepwater Horizon oil spill.

The resistance of killifish to environmental changes, including toxicity, appears to be a longstanding adaptation of theirs. Abundant fossils of the extinct Miocene-aged killifish Kenyaichthys have been recovered from a prehistoric lake of the Lukeino Formation where few other fish fossils have been found. It has been suggested that this lake was subject to frequent flash droughts and increased heavy metal load from a nearby volcano. The Kenyaichthys fossils show evidence of deformities as a result of this metal load, but were still successful inhabitants of the lake.
