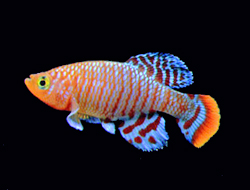
- Bluefin notho, Nothobranchius rachovii

Scientific classification
- Kingdom: Animalia
- Phylum: Chordata
- Class: Actinopterygii
- Order: Cyprinodontiformes
- Suborder: Aplocheiloidei
- Family: Nothobranchiidae; Garman, 1895

= Nothobranchiidae =

Family of fishes

Nothobranchiidae are a family of bony fishes containing roughly 300 species, also known as African rivulines. They are small killifish, usually measuring about 5 centimetres (2.0 in). They are limited to Africa, living in fresh water but being also somewhat salt-tolerant. They are also found in muddy or brackish water. Some species are kept as aquarium pets. They have frilly fins and many are brightly colored. They were formerly included in the family Aplocheilidae (which was later limited to Malagasy, Seychellean and Asian species); a return to that broader family has recently been suggested.

Members of genus Nothobranchius are found in mud pools on the plains of Africa, a habitat shared by no other fish except the lungfishes. Their life cycle is only a year long, and they die when the pools dry up, however the species survives because their eggs remain inactive (in diapause) in the dry bottom substrate throughout the dry season. (This is not true for lungfish, which are capable of surviving seasonal drying out of their habitats by burrowing into mud and estivating throughout the dry season. They can live to be at least 80 years of age.) Pools of this type are often sprayed with poison to reduce mosquito populations, which also kills the fish. As might be expected with short-lived species living in an ephemeral habitat, many of these fish reach sexual maturity within weeks of hatching, and are prolific breeders.

Nothobranchius furzeri is the shortest-living vertebrate that can be bred in captivity, having a lifespan of between three and nine months. Nothobranchius furzeri needs much food because it grows quickly, so when food supplied is inadequate, bigger fish will eat the smaller fish.

The genus name Nothobranchius comes from Ancient Greek νόθος (nóthos), meaning 'crossbred', and βράγχιος (bránkhios), meaning 'with gills'.

== Genera ==
The following genera are classified in the family Nothobranchiidae:

- Aphyosemion Myers, 1924 (including Chromaphysemion)
- Archiaphyosemion Radda, 1977
- Callopanchax Myers, 1933
- Diapteron Huber & Seegers, 1977
- Epiplatys Gill, 1862
- Episemion Radda & Pürzl, 1987
- Fenerbahce Özdikmen, Polat, Yilmaz & Yazıcıoğlu, 2006 (formerly Adamas)
- Foerschichthys Scheel & Romand, 1981
- Fundulopanchax Myers, 1924
- Fundulosoma Ahl, 1924
- Nimbapanchax Sonnenberg & Busch, 2009
- Nothobranchius Peters, 1868
- Pronothobranchius Radda, 1969
- Raddaella Huber, 1977
- Scriptaphyosemion Radda & Pürzl, 1987
