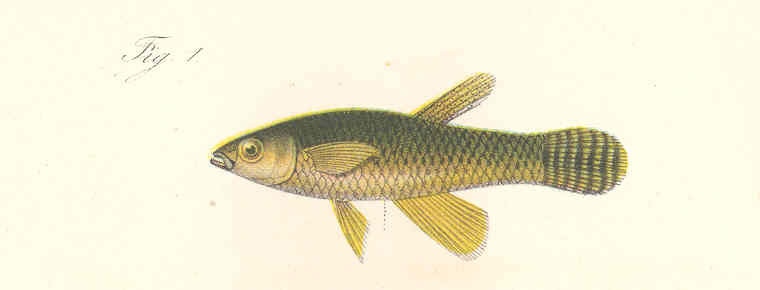

Conservation status
- Least Concern (IUCN 3.1)

Scientific classification
- Kingdom: Animalia
- Phylum: Chordata
- Class: Actinopterygii
- Order: Cyprinodontiformes
- Family: Procatopodidae
- Subfamily: Aplocheilichythinae; Myers, 1928
- Genus: Aplocheilichthys; Bleeker, 1863
- Species: A. spilauchen

Binomial name
- Aplocheilichthys spilauchen (Duméril, 1861)

Synonyms
- Aplocheilus spilauchen (Duméril, 1861); Epiplatys spilauchen (Duméril, 1861); Haplochilichthys spilauchen (Duméril, 1861); Haplochilus spilauchen (Duméril, 1861); Haplochilus spilauchenus (Duméril, 1861); Panchax spilauchen (Duméril, 1861); Aplocheilichthys typus Bleeker, 1863; Poecilia bensonii Peters, 1864; Aplocheilichthys bensonii (Peters, 1864); Aplocheilichthys tschiloangensis Ahl, 1928

= Banded lampeye =

Species of fish

The banded lampeye (Aplocheilichthys spilauchen) is a species of procatopodid that is native to Africa, ranging from Senegal to Angola. It is mainly found in coastal brackish habitats (only infrequently in pure fresh or salt water) such as river mouths, lagoons and mangrove swamps. It reaches up to 7 cm (2.8 in) in total length.

== Description ==
Banded lampeyes are small killifish, with an average length of 7 centimetres (2.8 in) with a somewhat cylindrical body and short, rounded fins. It has round scales and a dorsally flattened head with the a terminal mouth. They are a pale cream in colour with an iridescent silvery blue band running along the flanks, this band is more marked towards the tail. Males have the rear of the body, close to the tail, marked with vertical bars which are the same colour as the band along the flanks, their fins will be more intensively coloured than those of the females. There is a bright spot above the, which gives rise to the common name lampeye.

== Distribution ==
Banded lampeyes are found in river mouths along the western coast of Africa. In West Africa this species occurs from the Senegal River to Nigeria; a second population is found around the mouth of the Congo River and nearby estuaries and deltas from Cameroon to Angola. The southernmost records are from the Chiloango River in Cabinda and the Lower Cuanza River near Luanda.

== Habitat and biology ==
The banded lampeye is a sedentary, benthopelagic fish. It is found in brackish water in coastal swamps, river mouths, lagoons and mangroves and is rarely recorded in either pure freshwater or pur marine water. It is a carnivorous species which feeds on insect larvae, small aquatic insects, small crustaceans, and worms. This species is not a live bearer and the females scatter their eggs over plants when spawning, the eggs sticking to the plants. They can live for up to five years in captivity.

== Taxonomy ==
Currently the only member of Aplocheilichthys, this genus formerly included numerous other species that now are placed in Foerschichthys, Lacustricola, Micropanchax, Pantanodon, Plataplochilus, Poropanchax and Rhexipanchax. The 5th edition of Fishes of the World places the genus Aplocheilichthys in the monotypic subfamily Aplocheilichythinae but other authorities place this taxon in the subfamily Procatopodinae.
