= Lacustricola nitidus =

Scientific classification
- Kingdom: Animalia
- Phylum: Chordata
- Class: Actinopterygii
- Division: Teleostei
- Order: Cyprinodontiformes
- Family: Procatopodidae
- Genus: Lacustricola
- Species: L. nitidus

Binomial name
- Lacustricola nitidus Nagy & Chocha Manda, 2020

Species of fish

Lacustricola nitidus is a species of fish in the family Procatopodidae. This species is endemic to freshwater habitats in southeastern Democratic Republic of the Congo.

== Links ==
- Lacustricola nitidus on WildNothos - various information and photographs of this species
