= Lacustricola gemma =

Conservation status
- Vulnerable (IUCN 3.1)

Scientific classification
- Kingdom: Animalia
- Phylum: Chordata
- Class: Actinopterygii
- Order: Cyprinodontiformes
- Family: Procatopodidae
- Genus: Lacustricola
- Species: L. gemma

Binomial name
- Lacustricola gemma Nagy, 2025

Species of fish

Lacustricola gemma is a species of fish in the family Procatopodidae. This species is endemic to freshwater habitats in southeastern Democratic Republic of the Congo.

== Links ==
- Lacustricola gemma on WildNothos - various information and photographs of this species
