= Lacustricola margaritatus =

Conservation status
- Least Concern (IUCN 3.1)

Scientific classification
- Kingdom: Animalia
- Phylum: Chordata
- Class: Actinopterygii
- Order: Cyprinodontiformes
- Family: Procatopodidae
- Genus: Lacustricola
- Species: L. margaritatus

Binomial name
- Lacustricola margaritatus Nagy & Watters, 2022

Species of fish

Lacustricola margaritatus is a species of fish in the family Procatopodidae. This species is endemic to freshwater habitats in the Lake Victoria and Lake Kyoga basins in eastern Africa. It is currently known from streams and swamps in the Lake Victoria basin in north-western Tanzania, south-western Kenya and southern Uganda, and in the Lake Kyoga basin in central Uganda.

== Links ==
- Lacustricola margaritatus on WildNothos - various information and photographs of this species
