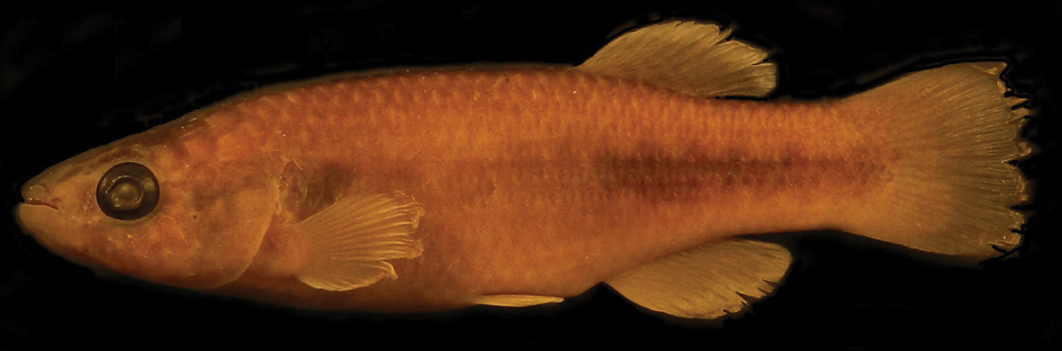
- Profundulus kreiseri
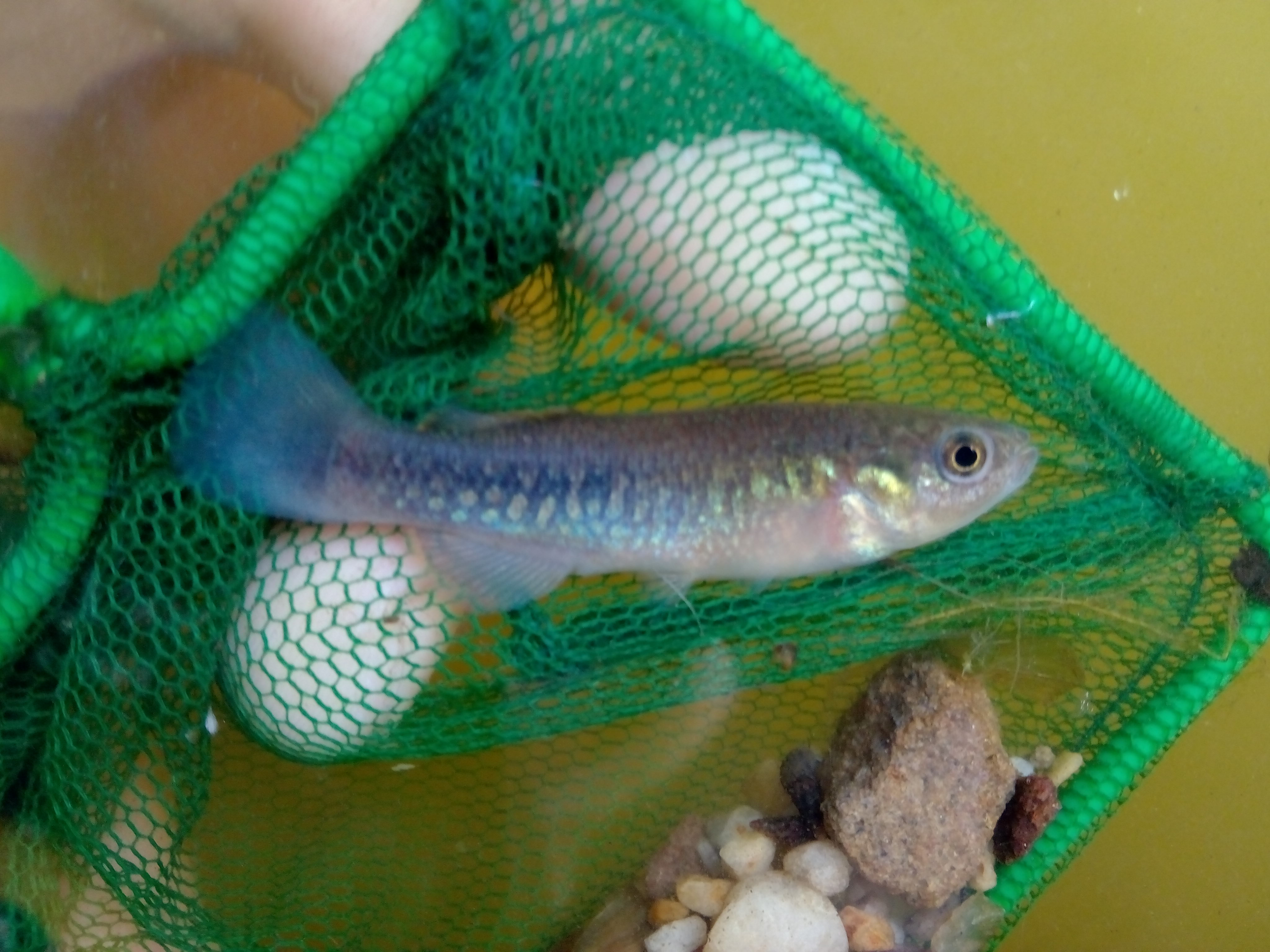
- Profundulus mixtlanensis

Scientific classification
- Kingdom: Animalia
- Phylum: Chordata
- Class: Actinopterygii
- Division: Teleostei
- Order: Cyprinodontiformes
- Family: Profundulidae
- Genus: Profundulus; C. L. Hubbs, 1924

Type species
- Fundulus punctatus Günther, 1866

= Profundulus =

Genus of fishes

Profundulus is a genus of fish in the family Profundulidae endemic to Mexico and northern Central America. It was regarded as the only genus in the Profundulidae but workers have split the genus and raised a second genus Tlaloc.

== Species ==
These are the currently recognized species in this genus:

- Profundulus adani Sara E. Dominguez-Cisneros, 2021
- Profundulus balsanus C. G. E. Ahl, 1935 (Balsas killifish)
- Profundulus candalarius Hubbs, 1924 (Headwater killifish)
- Profundulus chimalapensis Luis Fernando Del Moral-Flores, Eduardo López-Segovia & Tao Hernández-Arellano, 2020
- Profundulus guatemalensis (Günther, 1866) (Guatemalan killifish)
- Profundulus hectori Domínguez-Cisneros, Sara Elizabeth & Ernesto Velázquez-Velázquez, Omar Domínguez-Domínguez, Rosa Gabriela Beltrán-López. , 2025 (Mezcalapa killifish)
- Profundulus hildebrandi R. R. Miller, 1950 (Chiapas killifish)
- Profundulus kreiseri Matamoros, J. F. Schaefer, C. L. Hernández & Chakrabarty, 2012 (Kreiser's killifish)
- Profundulus labialis (Günther, 1866) (Largelip killifish)
- Profundulus mixtlanensis Ornelas-García, Martínez-Ramírez & Doadrio, 2015
- Profundulus oaxacae (Meek, 1902)
- Profundulus portillorum Matamoros & Schaefer, 2010
- Profundulus punctatus (Günther, 1866) (Oaxaca killifish)
