= Lacustricola petnehazyi =

Conservation status
- Endangered (IUCN 3.1)

Scientific classification
- Kingdom: Animalia
- Phylum: Chordata
- Class: Actinopterygii
- Order: Cyprinodontiformes
- Family: Procatopodidae
- Genus: Lacustricola
- Species: L. petnehazyi

Binomial name
- Lacustricola petnehazyi (Nagy & Vreven, 2018)

Synonyms
- Micropanchax petnehazyi

Species of fish

Lacustricola petnehazyi is a species of fish in the family Procatopodidae. This species is endemic to freshwater habitats in southeastern Democratic Republic of the Congo.

== Links ==
- Lacustricola petnehazyi on WildNothos - various information and photographs of this species
