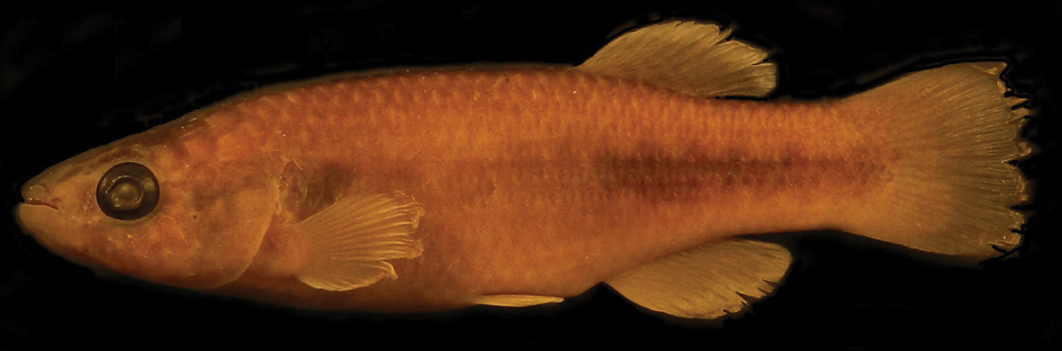
- Profundulus kreiseri holotype

Scientific classification
- Kingdom: Animalia
- Phylum: Chordata
- Class: Actinopterygii
- Order: Cyprinodontiformes
- Family: Profundulidae
- Genus: Profundulus
- Species: P. kreiseri

Binomial name
- Profundulus kreiseri Matamoros, Chakrabarty, Schaefer, and Hernández, 2012

= Profundulus kreiseri =

Species of fish

Profundulus kreiseri is a species of killifish native to the Chamelecón and Ulúa rivers in Honduras. It was first collected in 2009 and described as a new species in 2012.

== Description ==
Profundulus kreiseri grows to around 6 cm (2.4 in) in length. It is a brown color, with a golden blotch found on the operculum and lateral dark stripe. The head is covered in deeply-embedded scales.

== Etymology ==
The specific name, kreiseri, is in honor of Brian Kreiser, the doctoral advisor of paper author Wilfredo Matamoros.

== Taxonomic evaluation ==
Profundulus kreiseri was placed in the Profundulus subgenus and found to be the sister taxon to P. guatemalensis.
