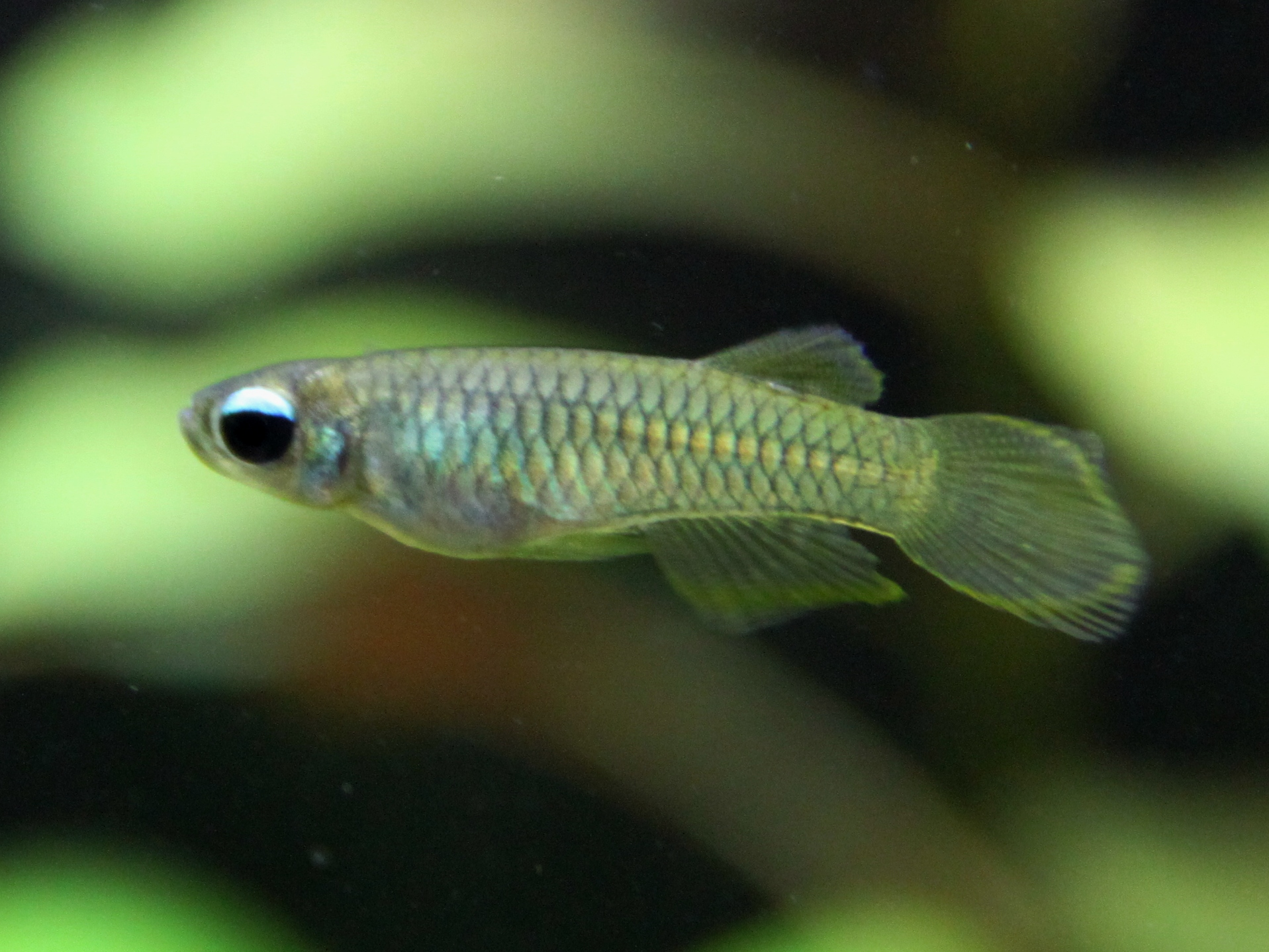

Scientific classification
- Kingdom: Animalia
- Phylum: Chordata
- Class: Actinopterygii
- Order: Cyprinodontiformes
- Family: Procatopodidae
- Genus: Poropanchax
- Species: P. normani

Binomial name
- Poropanchax normani (Ahl, 1928)
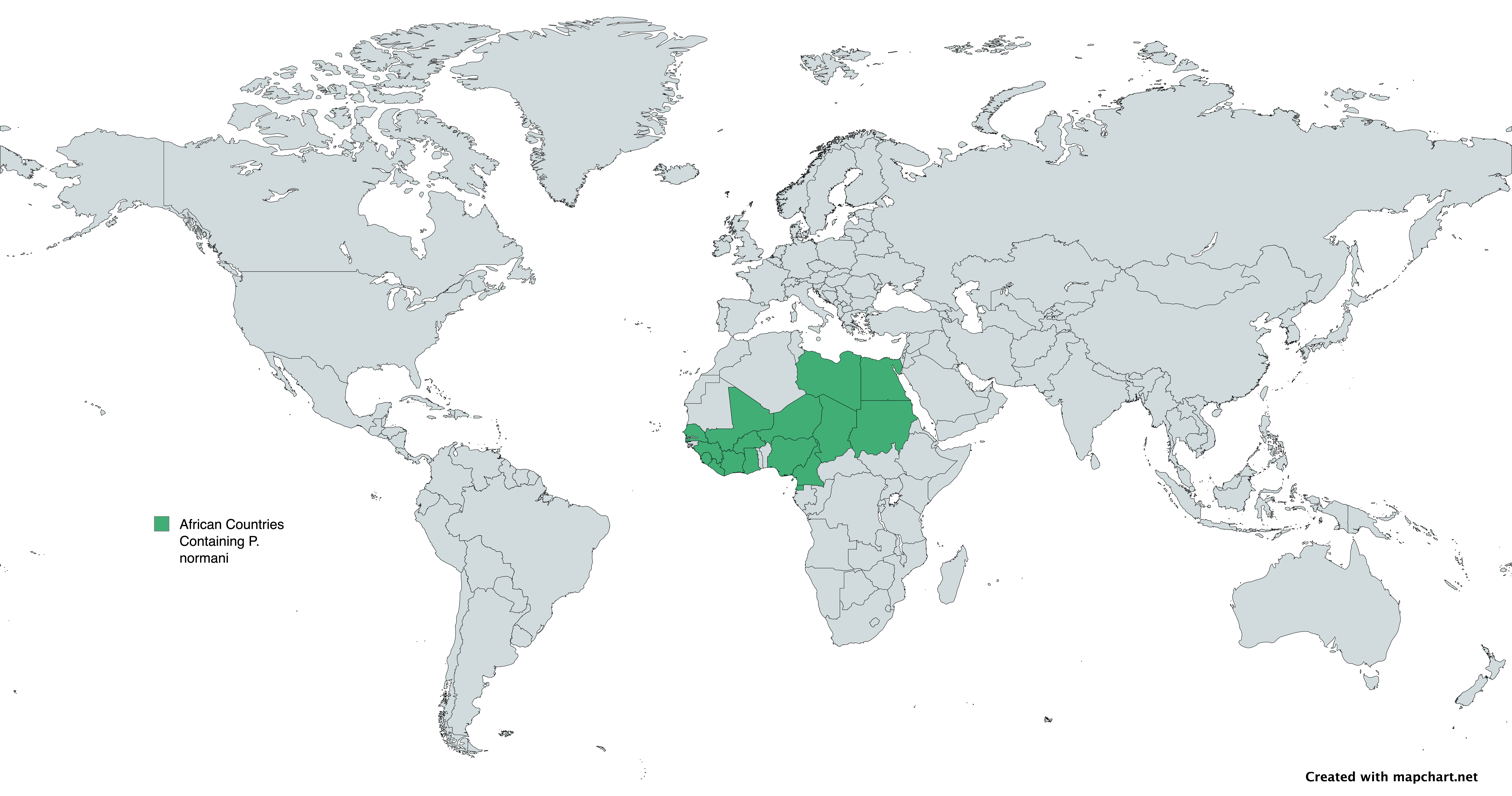
- Range Map

Synonyms
- Aplocheilichthys normani Ahl, 1928

= Poropanchax normani =

Norman's lampeye

Species of fish

Poropanchax normani, also known as the Norman's lampeye, is a species of procatopodine fish which is native to Africa. It belongs to the group of African lampeyes and livebearers (Procatopodidae).

== Etymology ==
The fish is named in honor of ichthyologist J. R. (John Roxborough) Norman (1898–1944), of the British Museum, who sent specimens to Ahl for "determination" of the species.

== Description ==
The Norman's lampeye is named for its bright markings located on its eyes. Its body is lightly colored, with a rounded caudal fin and large, rounded dorsal and anal fins near the posterior. The fish's eye is about 1.5–2 times the length of its head, a distinctive feature of African lampeyes. The surface and scales have a bluish tint with a yellow hue or outline on the body and the outer edges of the dorsal, caudal, and anal fins. This coloration is likely an adaptation to the highly vegetated areas where the fish is found and is passed down genetically. P. normani has a superiorly positioned mouth, which is typical of its surface-oriented, omnivorous feeding habits.

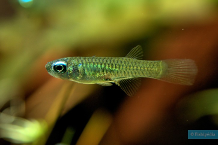
P. normani pictured above. Yellow, green, and blue coloration is clearly visible on the skin surface

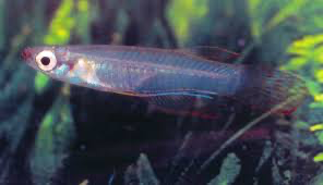
Wild Micropanchax scheeli, male, in the Equatorial Guinea

It is easy to confuse P. normani with its close relatives, P. stigmatopygus and Micropanchax scheeli, due to their similar body shapes and colors. However, the most distinguishing feature is their color patterns. P. normani exhibits a yellow and blue bicolor, while M. scheeli has a translucent gray body, and P. stigmatopygus has a yellow/gray mix on the body surface.

The vibrant colors, large eye, and small size of P. normani make it a popular choice for home aquariums. The species is readily available through aquarium trade and online vendors.

== History ==
The Late Miocene and Pleistocene eras in Africa were marked by rapid climate change and the aridification of the continent. P. normani's diversification and separation from its ancestor species are attributed to its adaptation to more arid environments in the Middle and Late Miocene. P. normani is found in Nilo-Sudanic systems such as the Senegal River and Lake Chad, as well as in rainforests in the Congo Basin. This has made P. normani the most widespread African lampeye species, with its abundance still notable today. Recent studies have corrected historical references to the genus, as the species was previously listed as Aplocheilichthys normani.

== Biology ==
P. normani grow to a maximum of approximately 4 centimetres (1.6 in) in length. Adult males and females typically weigh between 0.07–0.34 grams. The minimum total length for an adult is around 2 cm. Their lifespan is about 3–4 years. A high reproductive rate contributes to their status as a shoaling species. This species thrives in slow-moving waters, as indicated by the large, lobed fins on its body.

Although some famous members of the family Poeciliidae bear live young, P. normani lays small (1.49 ± 0.07 mm) eggs that are fertilized externally. Fertilized P. normani eggs are spherical and have a bundle of highly elastic, adhesive filaments on one side. The eggs are demersal, meaning they sink to the bottom, and the adhesive filaments likely help eggs attach to spawning sites or similar structures.

== Distribution ==
This species is found throughout Central and Western Africa, particularly in small rivers and swamps. P. normani inhabits humid coastal regions and a variety of freshwater habitats, including lakes, large and small rivers, and coastal swamps. Recent sightings have been recorded in Sub-Saharan and Sahel regions, including Lake Boukou in the Central Saharan Lakes, where the species is found in abundance. The fish is commonly observed at the surface of brackish, vegetated waters.

Countries where P. normani is found in freshwater rivers include Senegal, Ghana, Gambia, Sierra Leone, Guinea, Liberia, Mali, Burkina Faso, Côte d'Ivoire, Niger, Nigeria, Cameroon, Egypt, Libya, Sudan, and Chad.

== Diet ==
This fish feeds on aquatic invertebrates. In captivity, it thrives on a varied diet, such as Artemia, Daphnia, and bloodworms, and will also take small pellets and crushed flake foods. The fish can feed and adapt to vastly different ecological niches depending on the availability of the food. Common sources of food for the fish are small mosquito larvae developing on the surface of the water, organic matter stemming from plants, and small crustaceans. P. normani has a vast difference in feeding rate compared to juvenile and adult fish, where adult fish consume around 3–4 times more than their juvenile counterpart. Although P. normani can feed both during the day and night, higher preference and feeding rates are found in typical morning and daylight.

== Conservation status ==
As of October 2024, the IUCN lists P. normani as "Least Concern", meaning it is not currently at risk of endangerment. However, the aquarium trade, particularly in fisheries and home aquariums, could pose a threat to local ecosystems through improper practices. Climate change also represents a concern, as some populations of P. normani inhabit shallow water areas vulnerable to drought. While P. normani has greater "plasticity" (ability to adapt) compared to other species, extreme weather conditions may challenge the species' survival in the future.
