= Usangu lampeye =

Conservation status
- Vulnerable (IUCN 3.1)

Scientific classification
- Kingdom: Animalia
- Phylum: Chordata
- Class: Actinopterygii
- Order: Cyprinodontiformes
- Family: Procatopodidae
- Genus: Lacustricola
- Species: L. usanguensis

Binomial name
- Lacustricola usanguensis (Wildekamp, 1977)

Synonyms
- Aplocheilichthys usanguensis Wildekamp, 1977

Species of fish

The Usangu lampeye (Lacustricola usanguensis) is a species of poeciliid fish endemic to Tanzania. It occurs in the upper Little Ruaha River drainage. Its natural habitats are swamps, pools, and small streams. This species grows to a length of 3.0 centimetres (1.2 in) TL. It is also found in the aquarium trade.
