= Béla Nagy (ichthyologist) =

Hungarian independent researcher and ichthyologist

Béla Nagy is a Hungarian independent researcher in biology, explorer and storyteller. He is specialized in the seasonal killifish genus Nothobranchius, as well as members of the family Procatopodidae, both of them within the order Cyprinodontiformes.

He is the author of Rough Road into the Deep Unknown (ISBN 9786150235158) and Return to the Land of Rains (ISBN 9786158276412), adventure books documenting his scientific expeditions and discoveries of new fish species across sub-Saharan Africa.

== Taxon names authored ==
- Lacustricola gemma Nagy, 2025
- Lacustricola margaritatus Nagy & Watters, 2022
- Lacustricola nitidus Nagy & Chocha Manda, 2020
- Lacustricola petnehazyi (Nagy & Vreven, 2018)
- Nothobranchius albertinensis Nagy, Watters & Bellstedt, 2020
- Nothobranchius angelae Watters, Nagy & Bellstedt, 2019
- Nothobranchius attenboroughi Nagy, Watters & Bellstedt, 2020
- Nothobranchius chochamandai Nagy, 2014
- Nothobranchius cooperi Nagy, Watters & Bellstedt, 2017
- Nothobranchius ditte Nagy, 2018
- Nothobranchius dubieensis Nagy, 2025
- Nothobranchius elucens Nagy, 2021
- Nothobranchius flagrans Nagy, 2014
- Nothobranchius hoermanni Nagy, Watters & Bellstedt, 2020
- Nothobranchius iridescens Nagy, 2025
- Nothobranchius itigiensis Nagy, Watters & Bellstedt, 2020
- Nothobranchius katemomandai Nagy, 2025
- Nothobranchius marmoreus Nagy, 2025
- Nothobranchius matanduensis Watters, Nagy & Bellstedt, 2020
- Nothobranchius milvertzi Nagy, 2014
- Nothobranchius moameensis Nagy, Watters & Bellstedt, 2020
- Nothobranchius nikiforovi Nagy, Watters & Raspopova, 2021
- Nothobranchius ottoschmidti Watters, Nagy & Bellstedt, 2019
- Nothobranchius poppi Nagy, Chocha Manda & Vreven, 2016
- Nothobranchius rungwaensis Watters, Nagy & Bellstedt, 2019
- Nothobranchius sainthousei Nagy, Cotterill & Bellstedt, 2016
- Nothobranchius skeltoni Watters, Nagy & Bellstedt, 2019
- Nothobranchius sonjae Watters, Nagy & Bellstedt, 2019
- Nothobranchius sylvaticus Nagy, Bellstedt & Luke, 2025
- Nothobranchius taiti Nagy, 2019
- Nothobranchius venustus Nagy, Watters & Bellstedt, 2020

== Taxon described by him ==
- See Category:Taxa named by Béla Nagy

== Links ==
- WildNothos Photographs by Béla Nagy
- Béla Nagy. ResearchGate.
