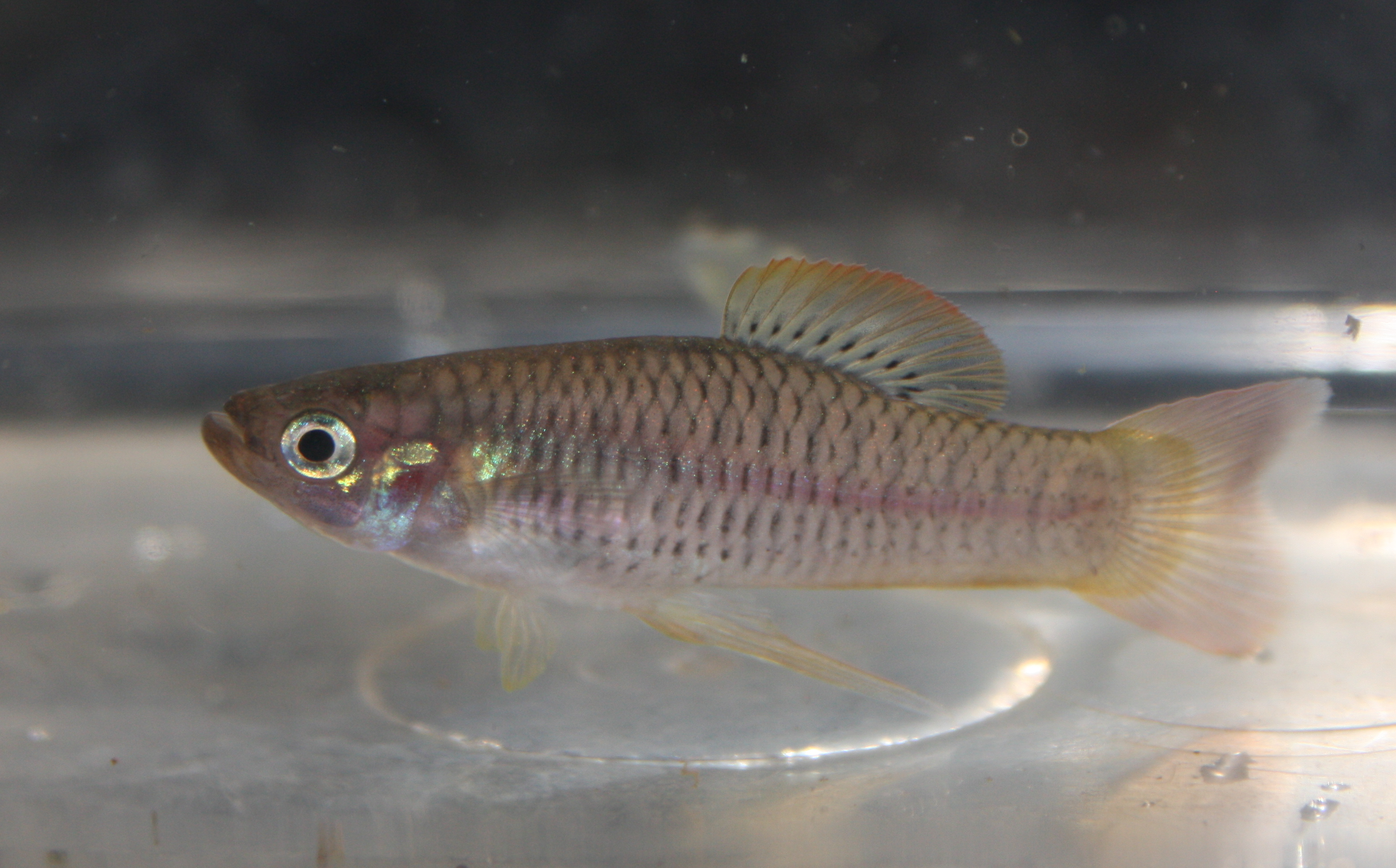
- A male
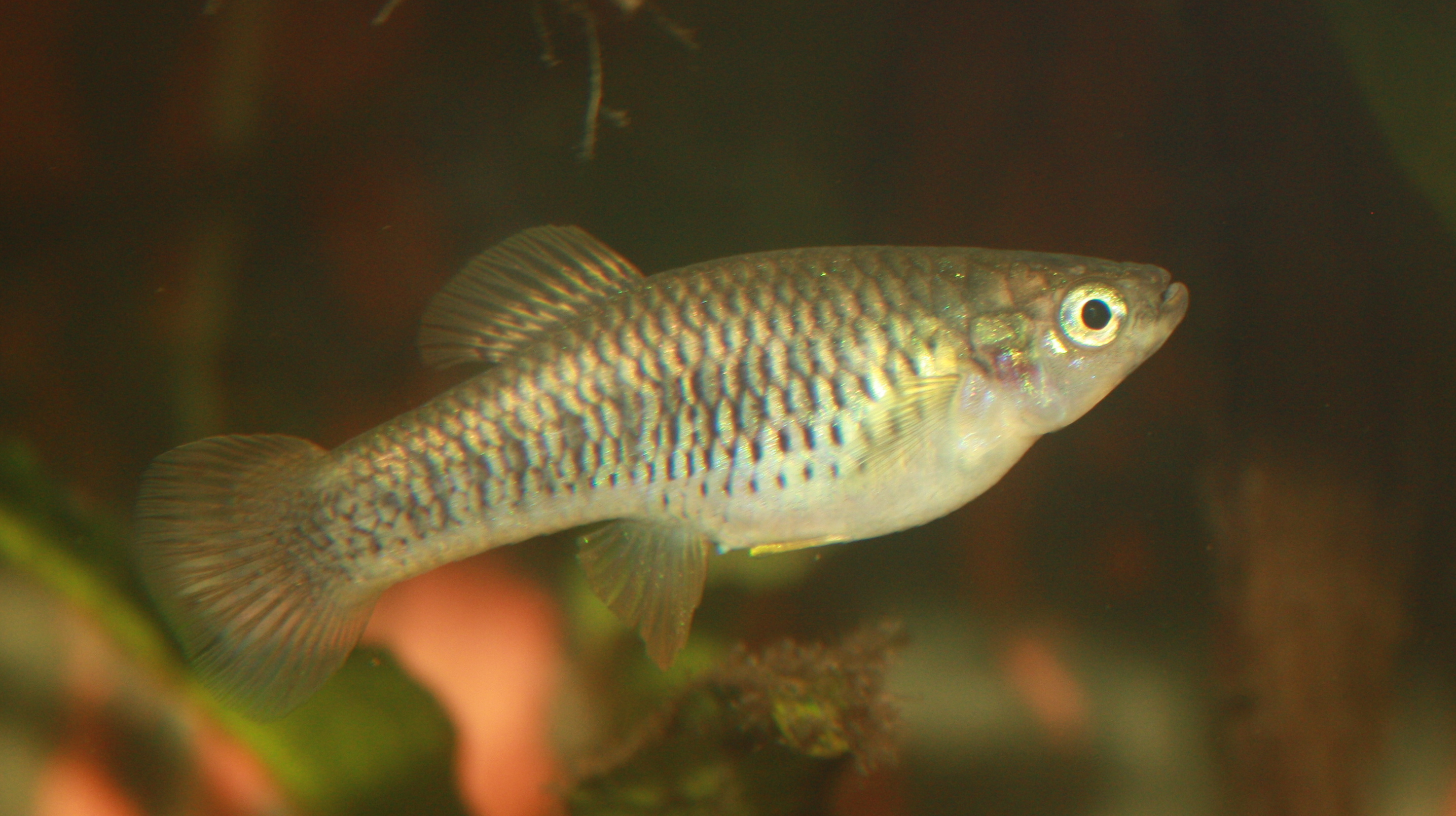
- A female

Conservation status
- Least Concern (IUCN 3.1)

Scientific classification
- Kingdom: Animalia
- Phylum: Chordata
- Class: Actinopterygii
- Order: Cyprinodontiformes
- Family: Poeciliidae
- Genus: Priapichthys
- Species: P. annectens

Binomial name
- Priapichthys annectens (Regan, 1907)

Synonyms
- Gambusia annectens Regan, 1907; Priapichthys annectens hesperis Hubbs, 1924

= Priapichthys annectens =

Species of fish

Priapichthys annectens, the orange-finned tooth carp, is a species of freshwater ray-finned fish belonging to the family Poeciliidae, which includes the guppies, mollies, mosquitofishes and related species. This fish is found in southern Central America.

== Taxonomy ==
Priapichthys annectens was first formally described as Gambusia annectens in 1907 by the British ichthyologist Charles Tate Regan with its type locality give as Irazú, Costa Rica. This species is now classified in the genus Priapichthys, a genus which was proposed by Regan in 1913 with the only species certainly named being G. annectens but in which he indicated there were five other species, in 1916 Arthur Wilbur Henn designated this species as the type species of Priapichthys. Praipichthys belongs to the subfamily Poeciliinae, the livebearers, of the family Poeciliidae in the suborder Cyprinodontoidei in the order Cyprinodontiformes.

== Etymology ==
Priapichthys annectens is the type species of the genus Priapichthys, a name which Regan did not explain but which almost certainly refers to the Greek fertility god Priapus, who was represented by an oversized penis and would be a reference to the longer gonopodium of this species compared to Gambusia. The specific name, annectens, means "linking" or "joining". a reference to this taxon forming a link between Gambusia bimaculata and G. episcopi, which were presumed to be its congeners.

== Description ==
Priapichthys annectens has black margins on the scales on the body and these create a cross-hatched pattern on the body, denser along the centre of the flanks and it can look like a series of X markings running along the body. There are between 6 and 12 vertical bars on the flanks, varying in intensity with locality. There are elongated black blotches on the dorsal fin at its base. The anterior rays of the anal fin are orange, otherwise the fins are colourless. The eyes and cheeks have slivery green tints. This species has a elongate body with a cylindrical cross section and attains a maximum total length of 4 cm (1.6 in) for males and 6.5 cm (2.6 in) for females.

== Distribution and habitat ==
Priapichthys annectens occurs in southern Nicaragua, Costa Rica and western Panama from the drainage basin. It is found from the Lake Nicaragua drainage throughout the Atlantic and Pacific slopes of Costa Rica, into the Atlantic slope in western Panama. It is found in small streams with variable current, and water temperature over sand or stony substrates.
