= Central East African lampeye =

Conservation status
- Least Concern (IUCN 3.1)

Scientific classification
- Kingdom: Animalia
- Phylum: Chordata
- Class: Actinopterygii
- Order: Cyprinodontiformes
- Family: Procatopodidae
- Genus: Lacustricola
- Species: L. centralis

Binomial name
- Lacustricola centralis (Seegers, 1996)

Synonyms
- Aplocheilichthys centralis

Species of fish

The Central East African lampeye (Lacustricola centralis) is a species of fish in the family Poeciliidae. It is found in Tanzania and Uganda. Its natural habitats are swamps, freshwater lakes, freshwater marshes, intermittent freshwater marshes, and inland deltas. It is threatened by habitat loss.
