= Bitschumbi lampeye =

Conservation status
- Least Concern (IUCN 3.1)

Scientific classification
- Kingdom: Animalia
- Phylum: Chordata
- Class: Actinopterygii
- Order: Cyprinodontiformes
- Family: Procatopodidae
- Genus: Lacustricola
- Species: L. vitschumbaensis

Binomial name
- Lacustricola vitschumbaensis (C. G. E. Ahl, 1924)

Synonyms
- Aplocheilichthys vitschumbaensis

Species of fish

The bitschumbi lampeye (Lacustricola vitschumbaensis) is a species of fish in the family Poeciliidae. It is found in the Democratic Republic of the Congo and Uganda. Its natural habitats are intermittent rivers, intermittent freshwater lakes, freshwater marshes, and intermittent freshwater marshes.
