= Lake Rudolf lampeye =

Conservation status
- Least Concern (IUCN 3.1)

Scientific classification
- Kingdom: Animalia
- Phylum: Chordata
- Class: Actinopterygii
- Order: Cyprinodontiformes
- Family: Procatopodidae
- Genus: Micropanchax
- Species: M. rudolfianus

Binomial name
- Micropanchax rudolfianus (Worthington, 1932)

Synonyms
- Haplochilichthys rudolfianus Worthington, 1932; Aplocheilichthys rudolfianus (Worthington, 1932)

Species of fish

The Lake Rudolf lampeye (Micropanchax rudolfianus) is a species of fish in the family Poeciliidae. It is endemic to Lake Turkana (formerly known as Lake Rudolf) in Kenya and south western Ethiopia. Within the lake it is found in shallow water among vegetation, spawning in the littoral zone and feeding on small insects and zooplankton.
