= Kongoro lampeye =

Conservation status
- Least Concern (IUCN 3.1)

Scientific classification
- Kingdom: Animalia
- Phylum: Chordata
- Class: Actinopterygii
- Order: Cyprinodontiformes
- Family: Procatopodidae
- Genus: Lacustricola
- Species: L. kongoranensis

Binomial name
- Lacustricola kongoranensis (C. G. E. Ahl, 1924)

Synonyms
- Aplocheilichthys kongoranensis

Species of fish

The Kongoro lampeye (Lacustricola kongoranensis) is a species of fish in the family Poeciliidae. It is endemic to Tanzania. Its natural habitats are rivers and intermittent rivers.
