= Nile killifish =

Conservation status
- Least Concern (IUCN 3.1)

Scientific classification
- Kingdom: Animalia
- Phylum: Chordata
- Class: Actinopterygii
- Order: Cyprinodontiformes
- Family: Procatopodidae
- Genus: Micropanchax
- Species: M. loati

Binomial name
- Micropanchax loati (Boulenger, 1901)

Synonyms
- Aplocheilichthys loati (Boulenger, 1901); Haplochilichthys loati (Boulenger, 1901); Haplochilus schoelleri Boulenger, 1904; Aplocheilichthys schoelleri (Boulenger, 1904); Haplochilichthys schoelleri (Boulenger, 1904); Micropanchax schoelleri (Boulenger, 1904)

Species of fish

The Nile killifish (Micropanchax loati), also known as the Nile lampeye, is a species of killifish from the family Poeciliidae. It is found in the White Nile drainage in Sudan, the Nile Delta in Egypt, the Wembere and Malagarasi Rivers in Tanzania and in the Lake Victoria basin in Uganda and Tanzania. However, it is thought to have been extirpated from Egypt, the introduction of alien poecilid fish, agricultural pollution and increasing salinity are all thought to have contributed to its local extinction in the Nile Delta.

The Nile killifish occurs in small bodies of water and in shallow well vegetated areas in larger water bodies. It can be found in swamps, irrigation ditches, brooks and small river. It does not inhabit temporary habitats and so is not a seasonal killifish. It is an oviparous species and its eggs are laid on vegetation, hanging on to the stalks and twigs by means of threads on the outer coating of the eggs. In captivity the eggs develop in about two weeks with the young reaching sexual maturity when they attain an age of 7–8 months. It grows to a maximum total length of 4 centimetres (1.6 in).

The Nile killifish was described in 1901 as Haplochilus schoelleri by the Belgian-British ichthyologist George Albert Boulenger (1858-1937) with the type locality being given as Lake No in South Sudan. The specific name honours William Leonard Stevenson Loat (1871-1932) a British archaeologist and naturalist who was the superintendent of the survey party responsible for collecting the type. It is the type species of the genus Micropanchax.
