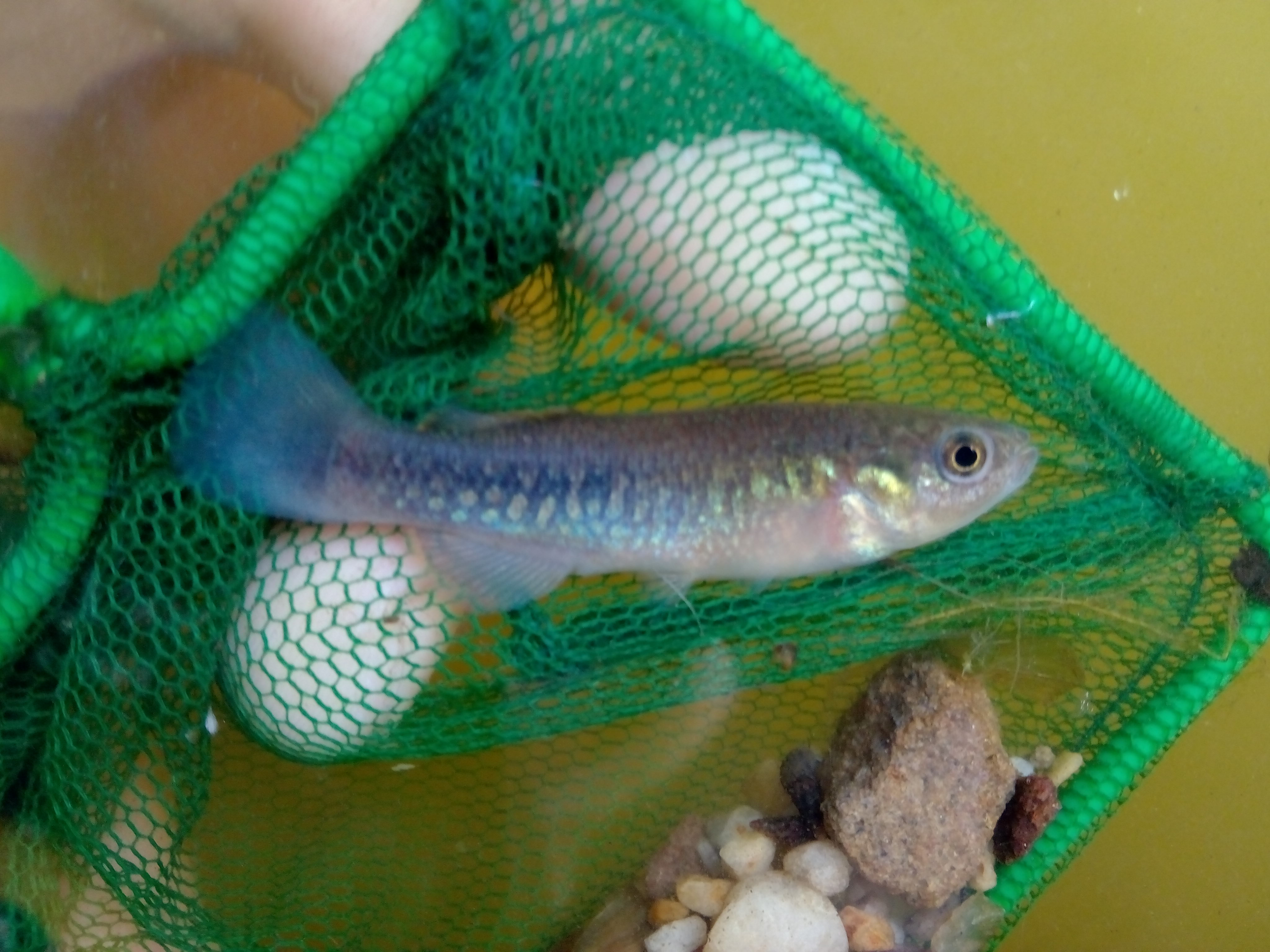

Conservation status
- Near Threatened (IUCN 3.1)

Scientific classification
- Kingdom: Animalia
- Phylum: Chordata
- Class: Actinopterygii
- Division: Teleostei
- Order: Cyprinodontiformes
- Family: Profundulidae
- Genus: Profundulus
- Species: P. mixtlanensis

Binomial name
- Profundulus mixtlanensis Ornelas-García, Martínez-Ramírez & Doadrio, 2015

Synonyms
- Profundulus mixtlanesis Ornelas-García, Martínez-Ramírez & Doadrio, 2015

= Profundulus mixtlanensis =

Species of freshwater fish

Profundulus mixtlanensis is a species of killifish that is endemic to the rivers of Oaxaca, Mexico.
