= Hypsopanchax =

Scientific classification
- Kingdom: Animalia
- Phylum: Chordata
- Class: Actinopterygii
- Order: Cyprinodontiformes
- Suborder: Cyprinodontoidei
- Family: Procatopodidae
- Subfamily: Procatopodinae
- Genus: Hypsopanchax; G. S. Myers, 1924

Type species
- Haplochilus platysternus Nichols & Griscom 1917

Genus of fishes

Hypsopanchax is a genus of poeciliids native to freshwater habitats in Middle Africa.

== Species ==
There are currently 6 recognized species in this genus:

- Hypsopanchax catenatus Radda, 1981 (Chain lampeye)
- Hypsopanchax jobaerti Poll & J. G. Lambert, 1965
- Hypsopanchax jubbi Poll & J. G. Lambert, 1965 (Southern deepbody)
- Hypsopanchax platysternus (Nichols & Griscom, 1917) (Zaire lampeye)
- Hypsopanchax stiassnyae van der Zee, Sonnenberg & Mbimbi, 2015
- Hypsopanchax zebra (Pellegrin, 1929) (Zebra lampeye)
