= Ruaha lampeye =

Conservation status
- Vulnerable (IUCN 3.1)

Scientific classification
- Kingdom: Animalia
- Phylum: Chordata
- Class: Actinopterygii
- Order: Cyprinodontiformes
- Family: Procatopodidae
- Genus: Lacustricola
- Species: L. omoculatus

Binomial name
- Lacustricola omoculatus (Wildekamp, 1977)

Synonyms
- Aplocheilichthys omoculatus Wildekamp, 1977

Species of fish

The Ruaha lampeye (Lacustricola omoculatus) is a species of poeciliid fish. It is endemic to Tanzania where it is only known to occur at its type locality in the Great Ruaha River drainage. Its natural habitats are swampy areas with out-flowing creeks. This species grows to a length of 3.5 centimetres (1.4 in) TL. It is also found in the aquarium trade.
