= Meshscaled topminnow =

Mesh-scaled topminnow

Conservation status
- Least Concern (IUCN 3.1)

Scientific classification
- Kingdom: Animalia
- Phylum: Chordata
- Class: Actinopterygii
- Order: Cyprinodontiformes
- Family: Procatopodidae
- Genus: Micropanchax
- Species: M. hutereaui

Binomial name
- Micropanchax hutereaui (Boulenger, 1913)

Synonyms
- Haplochilus hutereaui Boulenger, 1913; Aplocheilichthys hutereaui (Boulenger, 1913); Haplochilichthys hutereaui (Boulenger, 1913); Panchax hutereaui (Boulenger, 1913); Micropanchax baudoni Myers, 1924; Aplocheilichthys baudoni (Myers, 1924); Aplocheilus chobensis Fowler, 1935; Aplocheilichthys chobensis (Fowler, 1935); Micropanchax chobensis (Fowler, 1935); Aplocheilichthys schalleri Scheel & Radda, 1974; Micropanchax schalleri (Scheel & Radda, 1974)

Species of fish

The meshscaled topminnow (Micropanchax hutereaui) is a species of fish in the family Poeciliidae. The two population groups are a southern group of populations found in Angola, Botswana, the Republic of the Congo, Malawi, Mozambique, and Zambia and a northern population group found in Chad, the Central African Republic, the White Nile in South Sudan and Sudan and in the northern Democratic Republic of Congo. Its natural habitat is small streams and brooks, lakes, and swamps on floodplains where it lives among aquatic vegetation. This species was described by George Albert Boulenger as Haplochilus hutereaui in 1913 with the type locality being Dungu on the upper Uelé River in the Democratic Republic of Congo. Boulenger received the type from Armand Hutereau (1875–1914), who was the head of a Belgian ethnographic expedition to the Congo, so he honoured Hutereau in the specific name.
