= Bukoba lampeye =

Conservation status
- Least Concern (IUCN 3.1)

Scientific classification
- Kingdom: Animalia
- Phylum: Chordata
- Class: Actinopterygii
- Order: Cyprinodontiformes
- Family: Procatopodidae
- Genus: Lacustricola
- Species: L. bukobanus

Binomial name
- Lacustricola bukobanus (C. G. E. Ahl, 1924)

Synonyms
- Aplocheilichthys bukobanus

Species of fish

The Bukoba lampeye (Lacustricola bukobanus) is a species of fish in the family Poeciliidae. It is found in Kenya, Tanzania, and Uganda. Its natural habitats are rivers, swamps, freshwater marshes, and intermittent freshwater marshes.
