= Lake Rukwa lampeye =

Conservation status
- Least Concern (IUCN 3.1)

Scientific classification
- Kingdom: Animalia
- Phylum: Chordata
- Class: Actinopterygii
- Order: Cyprinodontiformes
- Family: Procatopodidae
- Genus: Micropanchax
- Species: M. fuelleborni

Binomial name
- Micropanchax fuelleborni (C. G. E. Ahl, 1924)

Synonyms
- Aplocheilichthys fuelleborni Ahl, 1924

Species of fish

The Lake Rukwa lampeye (Micropanchax fuelleborni) is a species of fish in the family Poeciliidae. Its natural habitats are intermittent rivers, freshwater marshes, and intermittent freshwater marshes. It is threatened by habitat loss. This species occurs in central Africa in Lake Rukwa, Tanzania, the Malagarasi River, Wembere River system and the upper basin of the Congo River. Its specific name honours the German physician and zoologist Friedrich Fülleborn (1866-1933), who collected the type.
