= Spotted lampeye =

Conservation status
- Least Concern (IUCN 3.1)

Scientific classification
- Domain: Eukaryota
- Kingdom: Animalia
- Phylum: Chordata
- Class: Actinopterygii
- Order: Cyprinodontiformes
- Family: Procatopodidae
- Genus: Lacustricola
- Species: L. maculatus

Binomial name
- Lacustricola maculatus (Klausewitz, 1957)

Synonyms
- Aplocheilichthys maculatus Klausewitz, 1957

Species of fish

The spotted lampeye (Lacustricola maculatus) is a species of poeciliid fish. It is native to the drainages of the Ruvu, Rufiji, Mbezi, and Wami Rivers in Kenya and Tanzania. This species grows to a length of 3.5 centimetres (1.4 in) TL. Its natural habitats are small rivers, brooks and swamps. This species is also found in the aquarium trade.
