= Procatopus =

Scientific classification
- Kingdom: Animalia
- Phylum: Chordata
- Class: Actinopterygii
- Order: Cyprinodontiformes
- Suborder: Cyprinodontoidei
- Family: Procatopodidae
- Subfamily: Procatopodinae
- Genus: Procatopus; Boulenger, 1904

Type species
- Procatopus nototaenia Boulenger 1904

Genus of fishes

Procatopus is a genus of African lampeyes native to tropical freshwater habitats in Cameroon and Nigeria.

== Species ==
There are currently three recognized species in this genus:

- Procatopus aberrans C. G. E. Ahl, 1927 (Bluegreen lampeye)
- Procatopus nototaenia Boulenger, 1904 (Large finned lampeye)
- Procatopus similis C. G. E. Ahl, 1927 (Variable lampeye)
