= Aapticheilichthys =

Scientific classification
- Kingdom: Animalia
- Phylum: Chordata
- Class: Actinopterygii
- Division: Teleostei
- Order: Cyprinodontiformes
- Family: Procatopodidae
- Subfamily: Procatopodinae
- Genus: Aapticheilichthys
- Species: A. websteri

Binomial name
- Aapticheilichthys websteri (Huber, 2007)

Synonyms
- Procatopus websteri Huber, 2007

Genus of fishes

Aapticheilichthys is a monotypic genus of killifish from the family Poeciliidae, the sole member species being Aapticheilichthys websteri. A. websteri was collected by the American fish breeder Kent Webster after whom the species was named. The type locality was Akaka Camp on the western coastal plain of Gabon. A. websteri was collected from a river that was less than 10 m (33 ft) wide on the night of the Asian tsunami (26 December 2004), though it is not clear what effect of the tsunami may have had on the local ecosystem.
