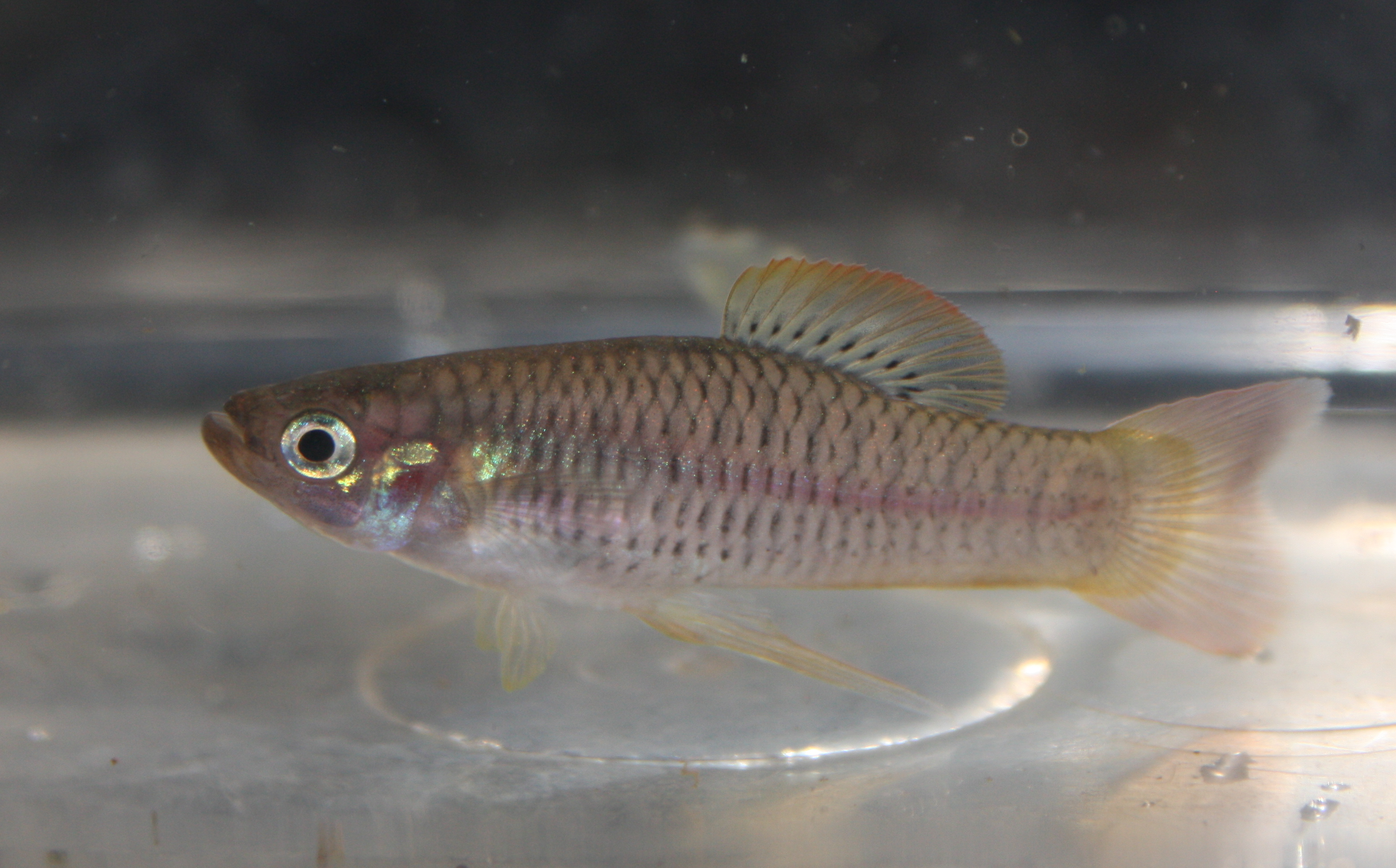
- P. annectens male

Scientific classification
- Kingdom: Animalia
- Phylum: Chordata
- Class: Actinopterygii
- Order: Cyprinodontiformes
- Family: Poeciliidae
- Tribe: Heterandriini
- Genus: Priapichthys; Regan, 1913

Type species
- Gambusia annectens Regan, 1907

Synonyms
- Alloheterandria Hubbs, 1924; Darienichthys Henn, 1916; Diphyacantha Hubbs, 1924; Panamichthys Hubbs, 1924

= Priapichthys =

Genus of fishes

Priapichthys is a genus of poeciliid fishes native to Costa Rica, Panama and Colombia.

== Species ==
There are currently seven recognized species in this genus:

- Priapichthys annectens (Regan, 1907)
- Priapichthys caliensis (C. H. Eigenmann & Henn, 1916)
- Priapichthys chocoensis (Henn, 1916)
- Priapichthys darienensis (Meek & Hildebrand, 1913)
- Priapichthys nigroventralis (C. H. Eigenmann & Henn, 1912)
- Priapichthys panamensis Meek & Hildebrand, 1916
- Priapichthys puetzi M. K. Meyer & Etzel, 1996
