= Hylopanchax =

Scientific classification
- Kingdom: Animalia
- Phylum: Chordata
- Class: Actinopterygii
- Order: Cyprinodontiformes
- Family: Procatopodidae
- Subfamily: Procatopodinae
- Genus: Hylopanchax; Poll & J. G. Lambert, 1965

Type species
- Hypsopanchax silvestris Poll & J. G. Lambert 1958

Genus of fishes

Hylopanchax is a genus of poeciliids native to the Congo River Basin and Ivindo River in Middle Africa.

== Species ==
There are currently 6 recognized species in this genus:

- Hylopanchax leki van der Zee, Sonnenberg & Schliewen, 2013
- Hylopanchax moke van der Zee, Sonnenberg & Schliewen, 2013
- Hylopanchax multisquamatus Bragança, van der Zee, Sonnenberg & Vreven, 2020
- Hylopanchax ndeko van der Zee, Sonnenberg & Schliewen, 2013
- Hylopanchax paucisquamatus Sonnenberg, Friel & van der Zee, 2014
- Hylopanchax silvestris Poll & J. G. Lambert, 1958
- Hylopanchax stictopleuron Fowler, 1949 (Blue lampeye)
- Hylopanchax thysi Bragança, van der Zee, Sonnenberg & Vreven, 2020
