= Plataplochilus =

Scientific classification
- Kingdom: Animalia
- Phylum: Chordata
- Class: Actinopterygii
- Order: Cyprinodontiformes
- Suborder: Cyprinodontoidei
- Family: Procatopodidae
- Subfamily: Procatopodinae
- Genus: Plataplochilus; C. G. E. Ahl, 1928

Type species
- Haplochilichthys ngaensis C. G. E. Ahl, 1924

Genus of fishes

Plataplochilus is a genus of poeciliid fishes native to Middle Africa.

== Species ==
There are currently six recognized species in this genus:

- Plataplochilus cabindae (Boulenger, 1911)
- Plataplochilus chalcopyrus J. G. Lambert, 1963 (Flame lampeye)
- Plataplochilus loemensis (Pellegrin, 1924) (Loeme lampeye)
- Plataplochilus miltotaenia J. G. Lambert, 1963 (Red striped lampeye)
- Plataplochilus mimus J. G. Lambert, 1967
- Plataplochilus ngaensis (C. G. E. Ahl, 1924) (Nga lampeye)
- Plataplochilus terveri (Huber, 1981) (Terver's lampeye)
