= Laciris pelagica =

Conservation status
- Least Concern (IUCN 3.1)

Scientific classification
- Kingdom: Animalia
- Phylum: Chordata
- Class: Actinopterygii
- Order: Cyprinodontiformes
- Family: Procatopodidae
- Subfamily: Procatopodinae
- Genus: Laciris; Huber, 1981
- Species: L. pelagica

Binomial name
- Laciris pelagica (Worthington, 1932)

Synonyms
- Haplochilichthys pelagicus Worthington, 1932 (basionym); Aplocheilichthys pelagicus (Worthington, 1932); Laciris pelagicus (Worthington, 1932) (lapsus); Micropanchax pelagicus (Worthington, 1932)

Species of fish

Laciris pelagica is a species of poeciliid found in the Democratic Republic of the Congo and Uganda. It is endemic to Lake Edward where it is found near the surface in open water. This species grows to a total length of 8 cm (3.1 in). It was formerly included in Micropanchax, but recently, authorities have moved it to the monotypic genus Laciris.
