= Nothobranchius milvertzi =

Conservation status
- Endangered (IUCN 3.1)

Scientific classification
- Kingdom: Animalia
- Phylum: Chordata
- Class: Actinopterygii
- Order: Cyprinodontiformes
- Family: Nothobranchiidae
- Genus: Nothobranchius
- Species: N. milvertzi

Binomial name
- Nothobranchius milvertzi Nagy, 2014

Species of fish

Nothobranchius milvertzi is a species of seasonal killifish in the family Nothobranchiidae. This species is endemic to northern Zambia. It is known only from the area of the type locality - ephemeral pools formed on the floodplain and in the seasonal riverbeds of the Lushiba Marsh in the Lake Mweru basin, Luapula Province, northern Zambia.

== Etymology ==
The fish is named in honor of Finn Christian Milvertz.

== Links ==
- Nothobranchius milvertzi on WildNothos
