= Priapichthys caliensis =

Conservation status
- Data Deficient (IUCN 3.1)

Scientific classification
- Kingdom: Animalia
- Phylum: Chordata
- Class: Actinopterygii
- Order: Cyprinodontiformes
- Family: Poeciliidae
- Genus: Priapichthys
- Species: P. caliensis

Binomial name
- Priapichthys caliensis (C. H. Eigenmann & Henn, 1916)

Synonyms
- Gambusia caliensis Eigenmann & Henn, 1916; Alloheterandria caliensis (Eigenmann & Henn, 1916)

Species of fish

Priapichthys caliensis is a species of freshwater fish. It is a member of the family Poeciliidae of order Cyprinodontiformes. It is endemic to Colombia (the type locality is Cali, Colombia) and primarily inhabiting brooks and streams with currents of low to high velocity. A carnivorous surface feeder, it occurs in shoals near the shoreline.

This species has the terminal, upward-facing mouth typical of surface feeders, and a protruding belly. Adult specimens reach a maximum of approximately 3 cm standard length, i.e. full length of entire body, excluding caudal fin.
