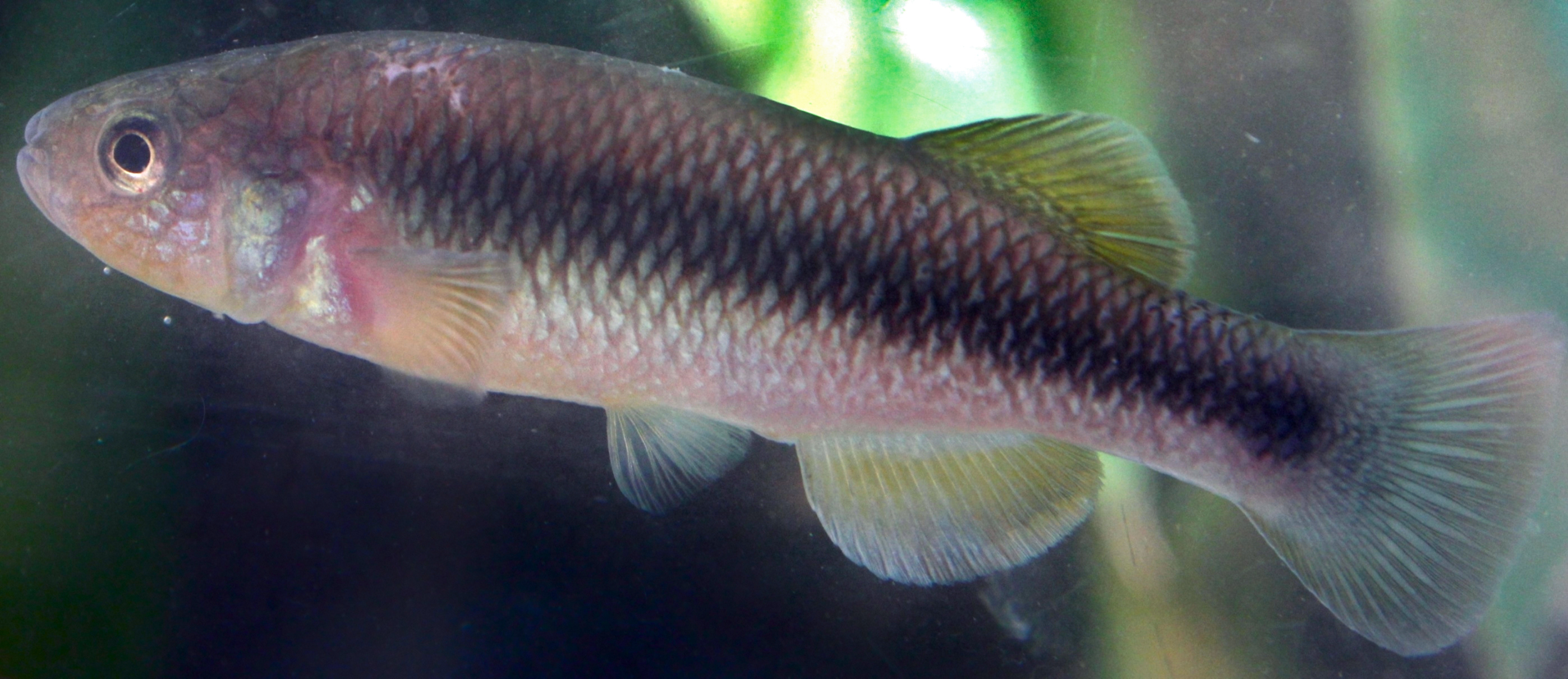

Conservation status
- Endangered (IUCN 3.1)

Scientific classification
- Kingdom: Animalia
- Phylum: Chordata
- Class: Actinopterygii
- Order: Cyprinodontiformes
- Family: Profundulidae
- Genus: Tlaloc
- Species: T. hildebrandi

Binomial name
- Tlaloc hildebrandi (R. R. Miller, 1950)

Synonyms
- Profundulus hildebrandi Miller, 1950

= Popoyote =

Species of fish

The Popoyote (Tlaloc hildebrandi), also known as the Chiapas killifish, is a killifish from the family Profundulidae which is endemic to the valley of San Cristobal de las Casas in the Chiapas Highlands in Southern Mexico. It is highly endangered because its natural habitat, which amounts to only a few square kilometers, is subject to contamination and urban sprawl from San Cristobal. It is currently being targeted by a civil society alliance for the protection of San Cristobal's wetlands.

Tlaloc hildebrandi was described in 1950 by Robert Rush Miller with the type locality given as the closed basin of San Cristóbal de las Casas in the Atlantic drainage of Chiapas at an elevation of 2,200 metres (7,200 ft). The specific name honours the American ichthyologist Samuel F. Hildebrand (1883-1949).

The popoyote can grow up to 13 centimetres (5.1 in) in length and weigh up to 36 grams (1.3 oz). It is marked with numerous vertical bars as a juvenile which disappear in the adult. Spawning begins at the end of February and continues until the onset of the rains in June. During breeding season the adults are greyish in colour with green tones and yellow fins. The popoyote uses the channels and puddles that remain after the rains to lay as many as 150 eggs per female, which hatch after three days. The larvae reach the juvenile stage after three months and in less than one year become adult. Their diet largely consists of the larvae and adults of mosquitoes, although they will also feed on molluscs as well as other insects, such as beetles and dragonflies.
