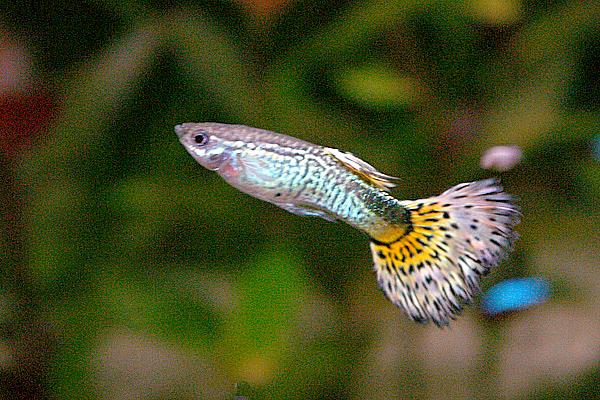
- Guppy Poecilia reticulata

Scientific classification
- Kingdom: Animalia
- Phylum: Chordata
- Class: Actinopterygii
- Order: Cyprinodontiformes
- Suborder: Cyprinodontoidei
- Superfamily: Poecilioidea; Parenti, 1981

Families
- See text

= Poecilioidea =

Superfamily of fishes

Poecilioidea is a superfamily of killifish, one of the four superfamilies which make up the suborder Cyprinodontoidei, which is in turn one of the two constituent suborders of the order Cyprinodontiformes. They are found in mainly in the Neotropics north into southern North America with a few species in Africa.

== Families ==
There are two families with in the superfamily Poecilioidea:

- Anablepidae Bonaparte, 1831
- Poeciliidae Bonaparte, 1831
