= Ruwenzori lampeye =

Conservation status
- Least Concern (IUCN 3.1)

Scientific classification
- Kingdom: Animalia
- Phylum: Chordata
- Class: Actinopterygii
- Order: Cyprinodontiformes
- Family: Procatopodidae
- Subfamily: Procatopodinae
- Genus: Platypanchax; C. G. E. Ahl, 1928
- Species: P. modestus

Binomial name
- Platypanchax modestus (Pappenheim, 1914)

Synonyms
- Haplochilus modestus Pappenheim, 1914; Hypsopanchax modestus (Pappenheim, 1914); Haplochilus deprimozi Pellegrin, 1928; Aplocheilichthys deprimozi (Pellegrin, 1928); Hypsopanchax deprimozi (Pellegrin, 1928); Haplochilichthys analis Worthington, 1932; Aplocheilichthys analis (Worthington, 1932); Hypsopanchax analis (Worthington, 1932)

Species of fish

The Ruwenzori lampeye (Platypanchax modestus) is a species of poeciliid fish native to the Democratic Republic of the Congo and Uganda. It is found along lake shores and in the inflows of rivers.
