= Profundulus guatemalensis =

Scientific classification
- Kingdom: Animalia
- Phylum: Chordata
- Class: Actinopterygii
- Division: Teleostei
- Order: Cyprinodontiformes
- Family: Profundulidae
- Genus: Profundulus
- Species: P. guatemalensis

Binomial name
- Profundulus guatemalensis (Günther, 1866)

Synonyms
- Fundulus guatemalensis Günther, 1866

Species of fish

Profundulus guatemalensis, the Guatemalan killifish, is a species of killifish from the family Profundulidae which is found in Central America in Honduras, El Salvador, Belize and Guatemala.
