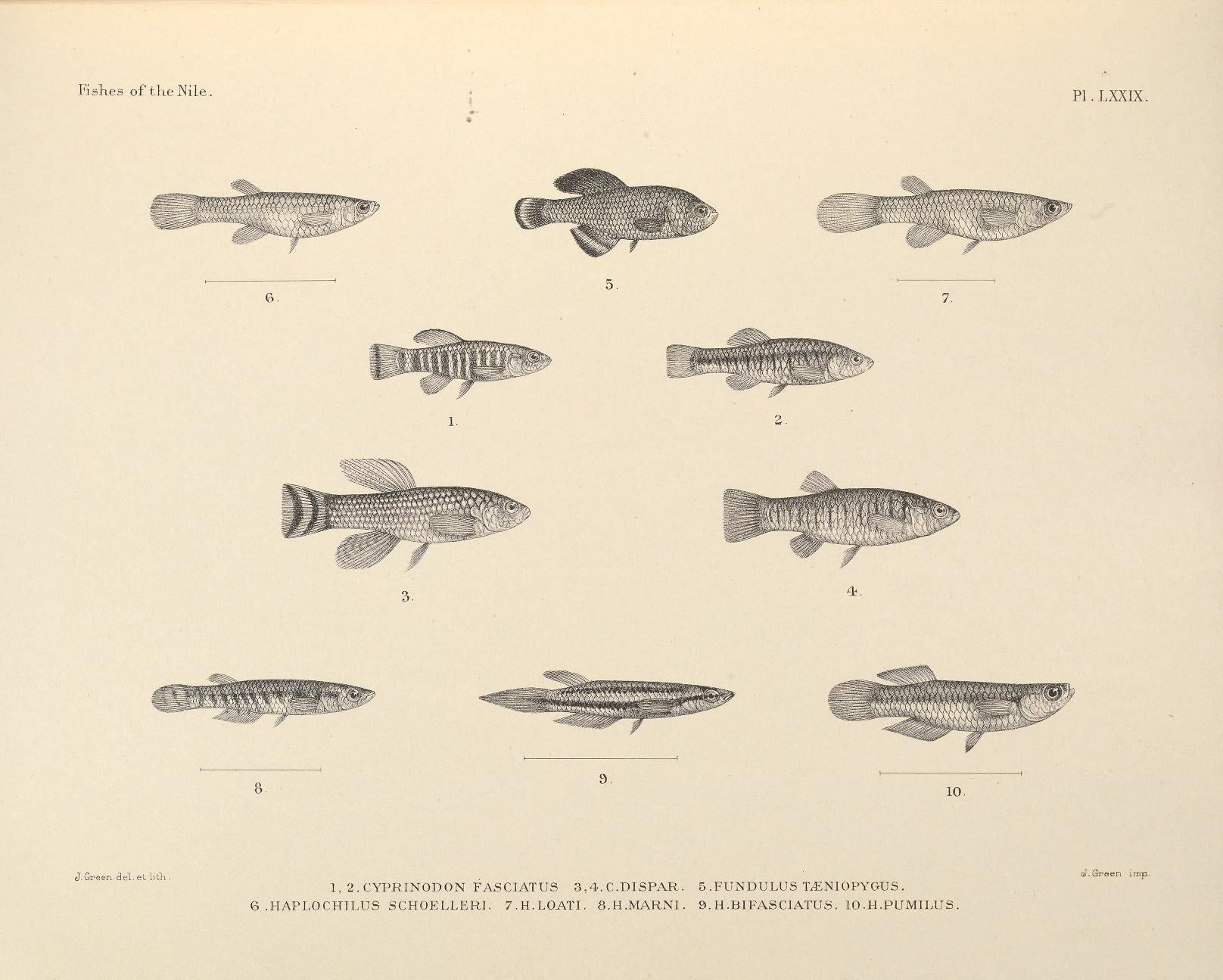
- The fishes of the Nile (Pl. LXXIX)

Scientific classification
- Kingdom: Animalia
- Phylum: Chordata
- Class: Actinopterygii
- Order: Cyprinodontiformes
- Suborder: Cyprinodontoidei
- Family: Procatopodidae
- Subfamily: Procatopodinae
- Genus: Micropanchax; G. S. Myers, 1924

Type species
- Haplochilus schoelleri, a synonym of M. loati Boulenger 1904

= Micropanchax =

Genus of fishes

Micropanchax is a genus of small Cyprinodontoid fish native to Africa.

== Species ==
The 13 recognized species in this genus are:

- Micropanchax antinorii (Vinciguerra, 1883) (black lampeye)
- Micropanchax bracheti (Berkenkamp, 1983)
- Micropanchax camerunensis (Radda, 1971) (Cameroon lampeye)
- Micropanchax ehrichi (Berkenkamp & Etzel, 1994)
- Micropanchax fuelleborni (Ahl, 1924) (Lake Rukwa lampeye)
- Micropanchax hutereaui (Boulenger, 1913) (mesh-scaled topminnow)
- Micropanchax johnstoni (Günther, 1894) (Johnston's topminnow)
- Micropanchax keilhacki (C. G. E. Ahl, 1928)
- Micropanchax kingii (Boulenger, 1913)
- Micropanchax loati (Boulenger, 1901) (Nile killifish)
- Micropanchax pfaffi (Daget, 1954) (Pfaff's lampeye)
- Micropanchax rudolfianus (Worthington, 1932) (Lake Rudolf lampeye)
- Micropanchax scheeli (Román, 1971) (Scheel's lampeye)

Laciris pelagicus (Worthington, 1932), formerly placed here, is now in Laciris.
