= Nothobranchius taiti =

Conservation status
- Endangered (IUCN 3.1)

Scientific classification
- Kingdom: Animalia
- Phylum: Chordata
- Class: Actinopterygii
- Order: Cyprinodontiformes
- Family: Nothobranchiidae
- Genus: Nothobranchius
- Species: N. taiti

Binomial name
- Nothobranchius taiti Nagy, 2019

Species of fish

Nothobranchius taiti is a species of brightly coloured seasonal killifish in the family Nothobranchiidae. It is endemic to Uganda. It is known from temporary pools and swamps formed on the seasonal floodplains of Apapi River system. The Apapi River is part of the Lake Kyoga basin in the upper Nile drainage in eastern Uganda.

== Etymology ==
The fish is named in honor of Colin C. Tait.

== Links ==
- Nothobranchius taiti on WildNothos
