= Nothobranchius sainthousei =

Conservation status
- Endangered (IUCN 3.1)

Scientific classification
- Kingdom: Animalia
- Phylum: Chordata
- Class: Actinopterygii
- Order: Cyprinodontiformes
- Family: Nothobranchiidae
- Genus: Nothobranchius
- Species: N. sainthousei

Binomial name
- Nothobranchius sainthousei Nagy, Cotterill & Bellstedt, 2016

Species of fish

Nothobranchius sainthousei is a species of brightly red- and blue colored seasonal killifish in the family Nothobranchiidae. It is endemic to freshwater habitats in the Chembe district of the Luapula Province in northern Zambia.

== Etymology ==
It was named in honour of Ian Sainthouse, a "renowned breeder and collector of killifish, for his special longstanding dedication to researches on the genus Nothobranchius".

== Description and habitat ==
Males grow up to about 41 millimetres of standard length (i.e. body length excluding caudal fin) and females circa 30 mm. The species is an annual killifish. They inhabit ephemeral pools filled by rainwater during the monsoon season, being adapted to the alteration of dry and wet seasons. As with all members of the genus Nothobranchius, they show extreme life-history adaptations: their embryos survive by entering a three to four month long diapause, within eggs that have a very hard chorion and are resistant to desiccation and hypoxia. When their habitats dry up during the dry season all adult fish die, and the species then survive solely due to the eggs laying dormant, encased in clay.

== Type locality and type material ==
The type locality is listed as "Seasonal pools on floodplain of small seasonal Chimbembe River, about 5 km southwest from influx of Luongo into Luapula, near Mweshi village, Luapula Province, Zambia, 10°43.51'S, 28°38.22'E". The holotype is a 32.9 mm long male specimen preserved at the Royal Museum for Central Africa, filed under the ID "MRAC B5-027-P-0001". It was collected on April 6, 2012 by the Hungarian ichthyologist Béla Nagy and the Danish breeder and collector Finn Christian Milvertz. The same repository stores another male (40.8 mm, "MRAC B5-027-P-0002-4") as paratype, together width additional non-type material.

== See also ==
- Hypoxia in fish
