= Nothobranchius flagrans =

Conservation status
- Endangered (IUCN 3.1)

Scientific classification
- Kingdom: Animalia
- Phylum: Chordata
- Class: Actinopterygii
- Order: Cyprinodontiformes
- Family: Nothobranchiidae
- Genus: Nothobranchius
- Species: N. flagrans

Binomial name
- Nothobranchius flagrans Nagy, 2014

Species of fish

Nothobranchius flagrans is a species of brightly coloured killifish in the family Nothobranchiidae. This species is endemic to south-eastern Democratic Republic of Congo. It is currently known from temporary swamps in the Dikuluwe system in the lower Lufira River drainage.

== Links ==
- Nothobranchius flagrans on WildNothos - various information and photographs of this species
