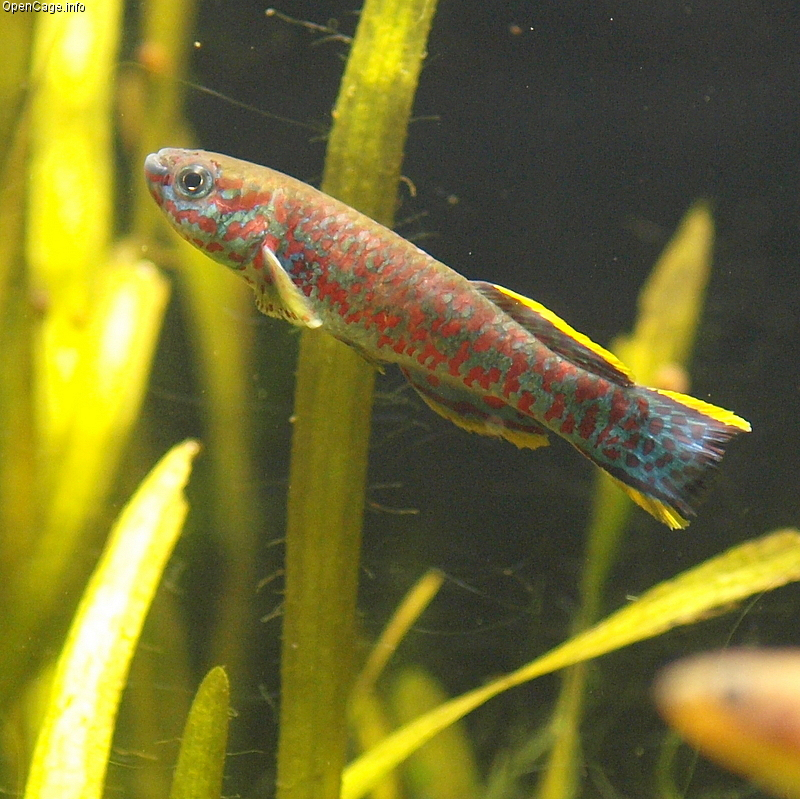
- Guatemalan killifish Fundulopanchax gardneri (Profundulidae)

Scientific classification
- Kingdom: Animalia
- Phylum: Chordata
- Class: Actinopterygii
- Order: Cyprinodontiformes
- Suborder: Cyprinodontoidei
- Superfamily: Funduloidea; Günther, 1866

= Funduloidea =

Superfamily of fishes

The Funduloidea is a superfamily of fishes in the suborder Cyprinodontoidei, one of two suborders which make up the order Cyprinodontiformes. It is one of four superfamilies within the suborder.

== Families ==
There are three families in the superfamily Funduloidea:

- Family Profundulidae Hoedeman & Bronner, 1951
- Family Goodeidae Jordan & Gilbert, 1883
- Family Fundulidae Günther, 1866
