= Nothobranchius ottoschmidti =

Conservation status
- Least Concern (IUCN 3.1)

Scientific classification
- Kingdom: Animalia
- Phylum: Chordata
- Class: Actinopterygii
- Order: Cyprinodontiformes
- Family: Nothobranchiidae
- Genus: Nothobranchius
- Species: N. ottoschmidti

Binomial name
- Nothobranchius ottoschmidti Watters, Nagy & Bellstedt, 2020

Species of fish

Nothobranchius ottoschmidti is a species of brightly colored seasonal killifish in the family Nothobranchiidae. This species is endemic to seasonal freshwater habitats in north-central Tanzania in Eastern Africa.

== Etymology ==
The authors dedicate the specific name in honour of Otto Schmidt, a keen birder and fish enthusiast, for his long-time and significant contributions to the study of fishes of the genus Nothobranchius.

== Links ==
- Nothobranchius ottoschmidti on WildNothos - various information and photographs of this species
