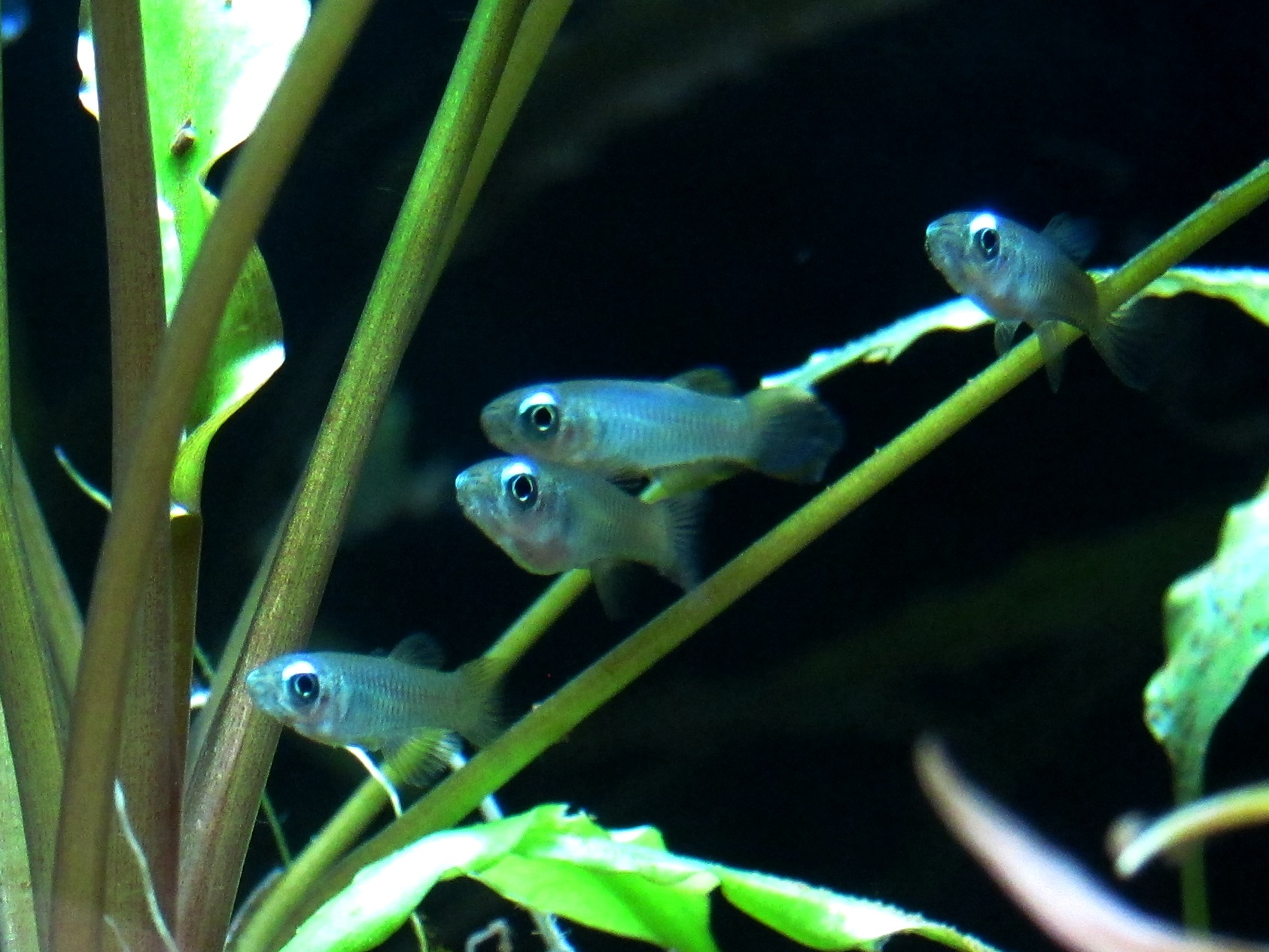
- Norman's lampeye (P. normani)

Scientific classification
- Kingdom: Animalia
- Phylum: Chordata
- Class: Actinopterygii
- Order: Cyprinodontiformes
- Suborder: Cyprinodontoidei
- Family: Procatopodidae
- Subfamily: Procatopodinae
- Genus: Poropanchax; Clausen, 1967

Type species
- Aplocheilichthys macrophthalmus, a synonym of P. luxophthalmus Meinken, 1932

= Poropanchax =

Genus of fishes

Poropanchax is a genus of small poeciliid fishes native to Africa.

== Species ==
There are currently six recognized species in this genus:

- Poropanchax brichardi (Poll, 1971) (Brichard's lampeye)
- Poropanchax luxophthalmus (Brüning, 1929)
- Poropanchax myersi (Poll, 1952) (Hummingbird lampeye)
- Poropanchax normani (C. G. E. Ahl, 1928) (Norman's lampeye)
- Poropanchax rancureli (Daget, 1965) (Rancurel's lampeye)
- Poropanchax stigmatopygus Wildekamp & Malumbres, 2004

A seventh species is recognized by Catalog of Fishes, but not by FishBase where considered a synonym of P. luxophthalmus:

- Poropanchax hannerzi (Scheel, 1968) (Hannerz' lampeye)
