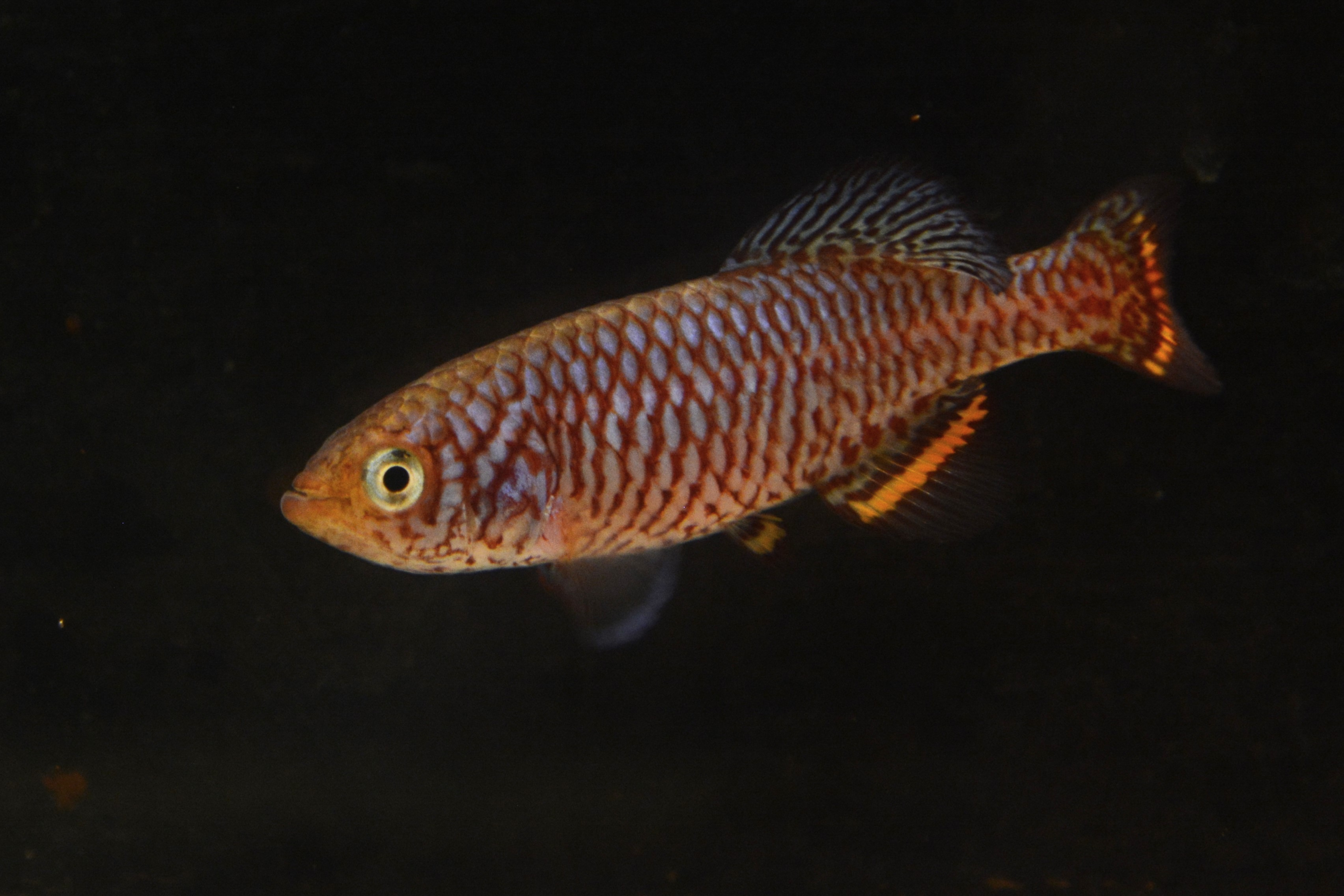

Conservation status
- Vulnerable (IUCN 3.1)

Scientific classification
- Kingdom: Animalia
- Phylum: Chordata
- Class: Actinopterygii
- Order: Cyprinodontiformes
- Family: Nothobranchiidae
- Genus: Nothobranchius
- Species: N. ditte

Binomial name
- Nothobranchius ditte Nagy, 2018

= Nothobranchius ditte =

Species of fish

Nothobranchius ditte is a species of brightly colored seasonal killifish in the family Nothobranchiidae, belonging to the Nothobranchius brieni species complex. It is endemic to freshwater habitats in the south-eastern parts of the Democratic Republic of the Congo. Adult males reach a length of about 40–42 mm, but the females are slightly smaller. The species is a semi-annual killifish. They inhabit ephemeral pools filled by rainwater during the monsoon season, being adapted to the alteration of dry and wet seasons. As with all members of the genus Nothobranchius, they show extreme life-history adaptations: their embryos survive by entering a three or four month long diapause, within eggs that have a very hard chorion and are resistant to desiccation and hypoxia. When the habitats dry up, the adult fish die and the eggs survive encased in the clay during the dry season.

== Type locality and type material ==
The type locality is stated as "Ephemeral swamps of the Katate system, about 9.5 km northwest of Kilwa village, Lake Mweru basin, Democratic Republic of Congo, 09°12'33"S, 28°17'01"E". The holotype of the taxon is a 33.0 mm long male zoological specimen reposited as "MRAC 2016-027-P-0001" at the Royal Museum for Central Africa in Tervuren, Belgium, together with 12 paratypes.

== Etymology ==
Nagy gave it the specific name ditte in honour of his wife, Edit Csikós, "Ditte" being her nickname, for the care keeping all the fish alive during the absences of the author.

== Links ==
- Nothobranchius ditte on WildNothos - various information and photographs of this species
