= Nothobranchius moameensis =

Conservation status
- Endangered (IUCN 3.1)

Scientific classification
- Kingdom: Animalia
- Phylum: Chordata
- Class: Actinopterygii
- Order: Cyprinodontiformes
- Family: Nothobranchiidae
- Genus: Nothobranchius
- Species: N. moameensis

Binomial name
- Nothobranchius moameensis Nagy, Watters & Bellstedt, 2020

Species of fish

Nothobranchius moameensis is a species of brightly colored seasonal killifish in the family Nothobranchiidae. This species is endemic to seasonal freshwater habitats in northern Tanzania. It is currently known from ephemeral pools and marshes associated with the Moame and other smaller river systems south of Lake Victoria in the Moame system.

== Etymology ==
Te fishes name is from the Moame River drainage, Tanzania, from where the type locality is situated.

== Links ==
- Nothobranchius moameensis on WildNothos - various information and photographs of this species
