= Rhexipanchax =

Scientific classification
- Kingdom: Animalia
- Phylum: Chordata
- Class: Actinopterygii
- Order: Cyprinodontiformes
- Suborder: Cyprinodontoidei
- Family: Procatopodidae
- Subfamily: Procatopodinae
- Genus: Rhexipanchax; Huber, 1999

Type species
- Haplochilichthys nimbaensis Daget, 1948

Genus of fishes

Rhexipanchax is a genus of african lampeyes native to tropical West Africa.

== Species ==
There are currently four recognized species in this genus:

- Rhexipanchax kabae (Daget, 1962)
- Rhexipanchax lamberti (Daget, 1962) (Lambert's lampeye)
- Rhexipanchax nimbaensis (Daget, 1948) (Mt. Nimba lampeye)
- Rhexipanchax schioetzi (Scheel, 1968) (Schiötz' lampeye)
