= Nothobranchius hoermanni =

Conservation status
- Vulnerable (IUCN 3.1)

Scientific classification
- Kingdom: Animalia
- Phylum: Chordata
- Class: Actinopterygii
- Order: Cyprinodontiformes
- Family: Nothobranchiidae
- Genus: Nothobranchius
- Species: N. hoermanni

Binomial name
- Nothobranchius hoermanni Nagy, Watters & Bellstedt, 2020

Species of fish

Nothobranchius hoermanni is a species of brightly colored seasonal killifish in the family Nothobranchiidae. This species is endemic to seasonal freshwater habitats in central Tanzania. It is currently known from ephemeral pools and marshes associated with the Mhwala system in the upper Wembere drainage, as well as the Wala system, a tributary of the Malagarasi drainage. The type locality is associated with the headwaters of the Mhwala system.

== Etymology ==
The fish is named in honor of Alwin Hörmann of Kühnhausen, Germany.

== Links ==
- Nothobranchius hoermanni on WildNothos - various information and photographs of this species
