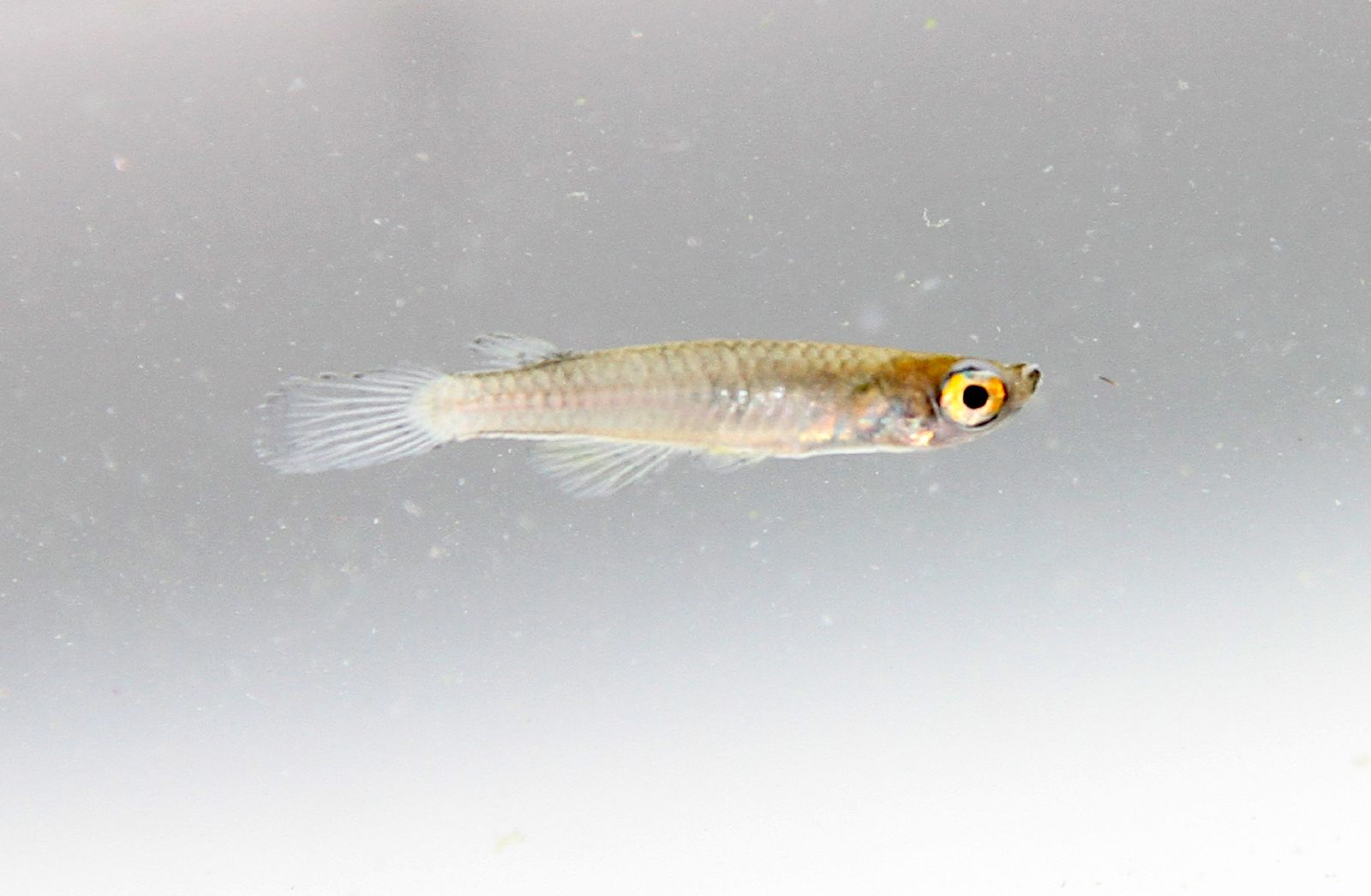
- Fluviphylax sp.

Scientific classification
- Kingdom: Animalia
- Phylum: Chordata
- Class: Actinopterygii
- Order: Cyprinodontiformes
- Suborder: Cyprinodontoidei
- Family: Fluviphylacidae; Roberts, 1970
- Genus: Fluviphylax; Whitley, 1965

Type species
- Potamophylax pygmaeus Myers & Carvalho, 1955

= Fluviphylax =

Genus of fishes

Fluviphylax is a genus of tiny cyprinodontiform fish native to the Amazon Basin, Orinoco Basin, and Oyapock Basin in South America.

It is the only member of the family Fluviphylacidae. Members of this genus are known as American lampeyes. Until recently, it was placed within the Poecilidae (namely within the otherwise-African clade Procatopodinae, which is now also treated as its own family), but more recent studies have found it to be the sister group to the clade consisting of Poecilidae and Anablepidae.

== Species ==
Five recognized species are placed in this genus:

- Fluviphylax obscurus W. J. E. M. Costa, 1996
- Fluviphylax palikur W. J. E. M. Costa & Le Bail, 1999
- Fluviphylax pygmaeus (G. S. Myers & J. de P. Carvalho, 1955)
- Fluviphylax simplex W. J. E. M. Costa, 1996
- Fluviphylax zonatus W. J. E. M. Costa, 1996
