= Foerschichthys =

Conservation status
- Least Concern (IUCN 3.1)

Scientific classification
- Kingdom: Animalia
- Phylum: Chordata
- Class: Actinopterygii
- Order: Cyprinodontiformes
- Family: Nothobranchiidae
- Genus: Foerschichthys; Scheel & Romand, 1981
- Species: F. flavipinnis

Binomial name
- Foerschichthys flavipinnis (Meinken, 1932)

Synonyms
- Aplocheilichthys flavipinnis Meinken, 1932; Panchax nigeriensis Brüning, 1929; Foerschichthys nigeriensis (Brüning, 1929)

Species of fish

Foerschichthys flavipinnis is a species of fish in the family Nothobranchiidae native to the western African nations of Ghana, Togo, Benin and Nigeria. This species grows to a length of 3.5 centimetres (1.4 in) TL. It is the only known member of its genus. This species was described by Herman Meinken as Aplocheilichthys flavipinnis in 1932 with the type locality given as being near Lagos in Nigeria.
