= William Leonard Stevenson Loat =

William Leonard Stevenson Loat (15 October 1871 in Norwood, Surrey – 10 April 1932 in Treclome, Mevagissey, Cornwall), also known as Leonard Loat, was the son of William L. and Marianna Eliza Stevenson. was a British archaeologist, naturalist and collector. Many of the objects he had collected from China, Egypt, Peru, Africa, Australia, Assam, Polynesia and North America were bequeathed to the British Museum in 1920 while her also donated some Australian items to the Plymouth City Museum. He often worked on excavations with Flinders Petrie, as well as being a member of the Egypt Excavation Fund. At some point he directed the excavations at Abydos. He first travelled to Egypt in 1899 as an assistant to the zoologist George Albert Boulenger of the British Museum (Natural History) on an ichthyological survey of the Nile. Later he took part in excavations at Gurob in 1903 for Petrie and at Abydos for the Egypt Excavation Fund in 1908-9 and 1912–13, He was responsible for finding and publishing a description of the Ibis Cemetery. The outbreak of the First World War in 1914 meant that he had to cease working in Egypt. He then married and took residence at Mevagissy, Cornwall where he pursued an interest in horticulture. He travelled to the Andes in 1927 and during the 1920s he presented some Egyptian objects to the Penzance Museum.

Loat is honoured in the specific names of at least two species of fish, Micropanchax loati a killifish he collected at Lake No in South Sudan and the cichlid Haplochromis loati which Loat collected at Gondokoro in South Sudan, in 1902.

He received the 4th class of the Imperial Ottoman Order of Osmanieh in 1902, conferred by the Khedive of Egypt for work that year on making a collection of Nile fish for the Egyptian government.

== Publications ==
The following is an incomplete list of publications authored by Loat:

- 1904 Gurob Publications of the Egyptian Research Account and British School of Archaeology in Egypt
- 1913 (with Thomas Eric Peet) The Cemeteries of Abydos. Part III.-1912-1913 Egypt Exploration Fund
- 1914 The Ibis cemetery at Abydos Egypt Exploration Society
