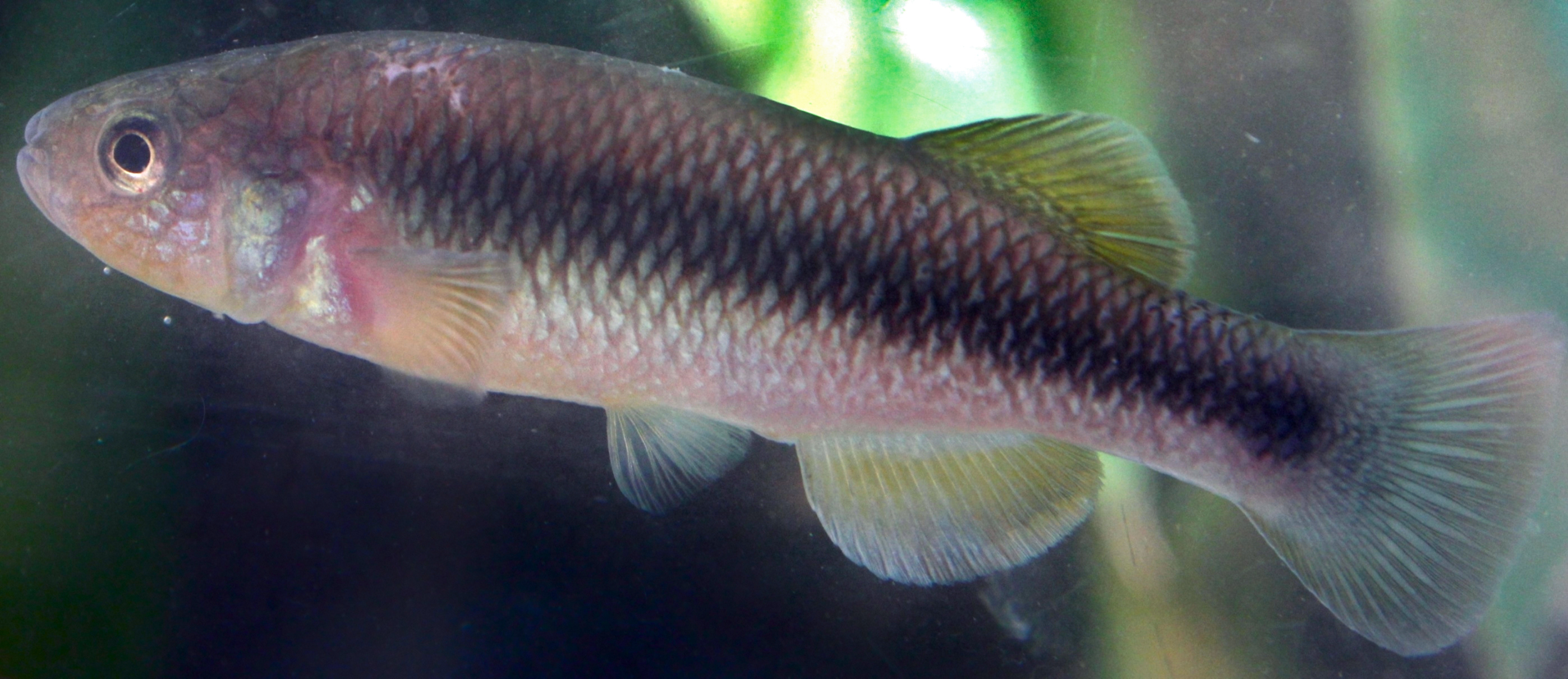
- Popoyote Tlaloc hildebrandi

Scientific classification
- Kingdom: Animalia
- Phylum: Chordata
- Class: Actinopterygii
- Order: Cyprinodontiformes
- Family: Profundulidae
- Genus: Tlaloc; Álvarez & Carranza, 1951

Type species
- Tlaloc mexicanus, a synonym of Profundulus labialis Álvarez & Carranza 1951

= Tlaloc (fish) =

Genus of fishes

Tlaloc is a genus of fish in the family Profundulidae endemic to Mexico, Guatemala and Honduras. The genus is not, however, recognised by Fishbase or in the 5th Edition of Fishes of the World. The genus is named for Tlaloc the water god of the Aztecs.

== Species ==
As delineated in 2015 there are 4 recognized species in this genus:

- Tlaloc candalarius (C. L. Hubbs, 1924) (Headwater killifish)
- Tlaloc hildebrandi (R. R. Miller, 1950) (Popoyote or Chiapas killifish)
- Tlaloc labialis (Günther, 1866) (Large-lip killifish)
- Tlaloc portillorum (Matamoros & J. F. Schaefer, 2010) (Ulúan killifish)
