= Lacustricola =

Scientific classification
- Kingdom: Animalia
- Phylum: Chordata
- Class: Actinopterygii
- Order: Cyprinodontiformes
- Family: Procatopodidae
- Subfamily: Procatopodinae
- Genus: Lacustricola; G. S. Myers, 1924

Genus of fishes

Lacustricola is a genus of poeciliids native to East, Southern and Middle Africa.

== Species ==
There are currently 20 recognized species in this genus:

- Lacustricola atripinna (Pfeffer, 1896)
- Lacustricola bukobanus (C. G. E. Ahl, 1924) (Bukoba lampeye)
- Lacustricola centralis (Seegers, 1996) (Central East African lampeye)
- Lacustricola jeanneli (Pellegrin, 1935) (Omo lampeye)
- Lacustricola kassenjiensis (C. G. E. Ahl, 1924) (Kasenye lampeye)
- Lacustricola katangae (Boulenger, 1912) (Striped topminnow)
- Lacustricola kongoranensis (C. G. E. Ahl, 1924) (Kongoro lampeye)
- Lacustricola lacustris (Seegers, 1984) (Kibiti lampeye)
- Lacustricola lualabaensis (Poll, 1938) (Lualaba lampeye)
- Lacustricola macrurus (Boulenger, 1904) (Big tailed lampeye)
- Lacustricola maculatus (Klausewitz, 1957) (Spotted lampeye)
- Lacustricola matthesi (Seegers, 1996) (Saisi lampeye)
- Lacustricola mediolateralis (Poll, 1967)
- Lacustricola moeruensis (Boulenger, 1914) (Moero lampeye)
- Lacustricola myaposae (Boulenger, 1908) (Natal topminnow)
- Lacustricola nigrolateralis (Poll, 1967)
- Lacustricola omoculatus (Wildekamp, 1977) (Ruaha lampeye)
- Lacustricola pumilus (Boulenger, 1906) (Tanganyika lampeye)
- Lacustricola usanguensis (Wildekamp, 1977) (Usangu lampeye)
- Lacustricola vitschumbaensis (C. G. E. Ahl, 1924) (Bitschumbi lampeye)
