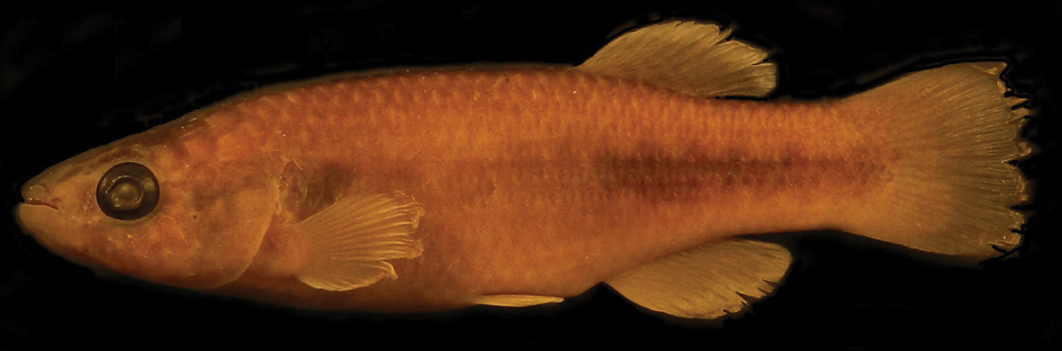
- Profundulus kreiseri

Scientific classification
- Kingdom: Animalia
- Phylum: Chordata
- Class: Actinopterygii
- Order: Cyprinodontiformes
- Superfamily: Funduloidea
- Family: Profundulidae; Hoedeman & Bronner, 1951

Genera
- See text

= Profundulidae =

Family of ray-finned fishes

Profundulidae is a family of killifishes. The species of this family are native to Central America and Mexico.

== Genera ==
The family consists of two genera:

- Profundulus Hubbs, 1924
- Tlaloc Álvarez & Carranza, 1951
