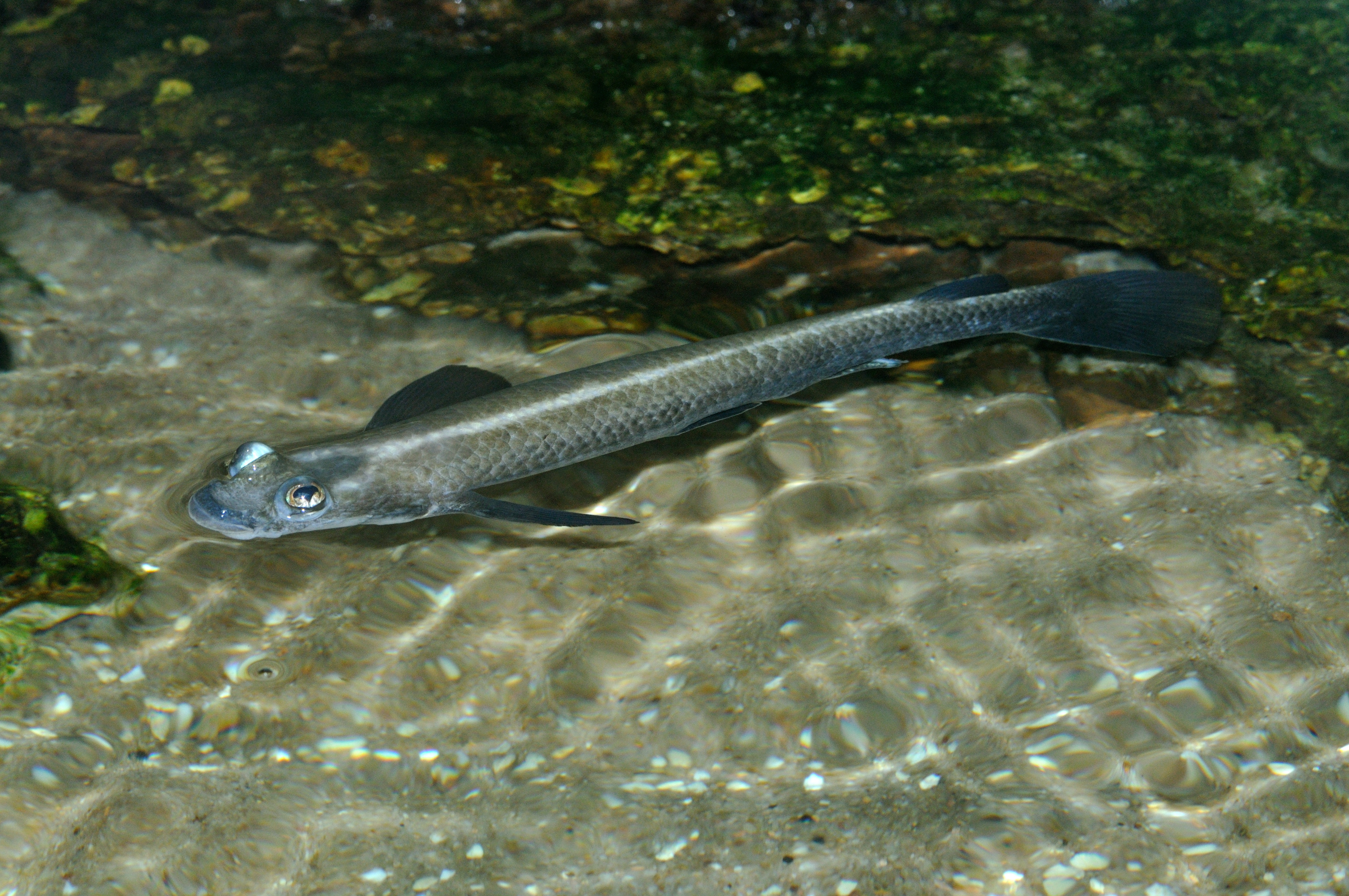
- Largescale four-eyes (Anableps anableps)

Scientific classification
- Kingdom: Animalia
- Phylum: Chordata
- Class: Actinopterygii
- Order: Cyprinodontiformes
- Suborder: Cyprinodontoidei; Parenti, 1981

Families
- See text

= Cyprinodontoidei =

Cyprinodontoidei Temporal range: Lutetian–present

Suborder of fishes

Cyprinodontoidei is a suborder of fishes, one of the two suborders in the order Cyprinodontiformes. The Cyprinodontoidei consists of eleven families which are found in the Americas, the Mediterranean and in Africa, including Madagascar.

== Classification ==
The Cyprinodontoidei is subdivided into the following families:

- Suborder Cyprinodontoidei
  - Family Pantanodontidae Myers, 1955 (spine killifishes)
  - Family Fundulidae Günther, 1866 (topminnows)
  - Family Cyprinodontidae Wagner, 1828 (pupfishes)
  - Family Profundulidae Hoedeman & Bronner, 1951 (Middle American killifishes)
  - Family Goodeidae Jordan & Gilbert, 1883 (splitfins or goodeids)
  - Family Fluviphylacidae Roberts, 1970 (American lampeyes)
  - Family Anablepidae Bonaparte, 1831 (four-eyed fish)
  - Family Poecilidae Bonaparte, 1831 (livebearers)
  - Family Aphaniidae Sethi, 1960 (Oriental killifishes)
  - Family Valenciidae Parenti, 1981 (Valencia toothcarps)
  - Family Procatopodidae Fowler, 1916 (African lampeyes)

In the past, the suborder was divided into the superfamilies Funduloidea, Valencioidea, Cyprinodontoidea, and Poeciloidea. However, this treatment is now known to be paraphyletic. For example, Pantanodontidae was formerly treated as a genus within Procatopodidae, which itself was treated as a subfamily of Poecilidae. However, genetic evidence supports Pantanodontidae actually being sister to the remaining members of the suborder, and the Procatopodidae to be distinct from the Poecilidae.

Indeterminate fossil teeth of a cyprinodontoid (identified to the Cyprinodontidae, but under an older treatment of the group that included several other families such as the Aphaniidae) are known from the Kuldana Formation of Pakistan, representing one of the earliest records of the group. Indeterminate fossil scales assigned to the dubious species Cyprinodon primulus are known from the Late Paleocene of Argentina, representing a potentially older record.

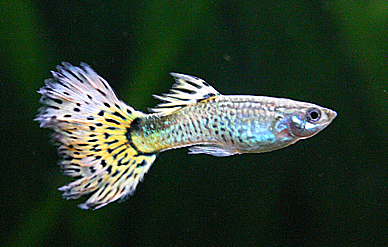
Guppy (Poecilia reticulata)
