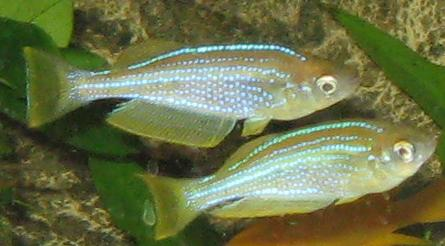
- Lamprichthys tanganicanus

Scientific classification
- Kingdom: Animalia
- Phylum: Chordata
- Class: Actinopterygii
- Order: Cyprinodontiformes
- Suborder: Cyprinodontoidei
- Family: Procatopodidae; Fowler, 1916

Type genus
- Procatopus Boulenger, 1904

Genera
- See text

= Procatopodidae =

Subfamily of fishes

Procatopodidae, the African lampeyes, are a family of ray-finned fish in the order Cyprinodontiformes.

They were formerly treated as a subfamily (Procatopodinae) of the Poecilidae. Despite containing mostly African genera (including Pantanodon), the South American Fluviphylax was also placed in it as its own tribe. However, more recent studies have found this treatment to be paraphyletic; Pantanodontidae, Fluviphylacidae, and Procatopodidae are their own families distinct from Poecilidae, and the former two are distinct from Procatopodidae as well. Meanwhile, the Aplocheilichthyinae, previously treated as a separate subfamily of Poecilidae, are known to belong to the Procatopodidae. This family is thought to be the sister group to the clade comprising Aphaniidae and Valenciidae.

== Subdivisions ==
The family Procatopodidae is divided into two subfamilies and 14 genera:

- Subfamily Aplocheilichthyinae Myers 1928
  - Aplocheilichthys Bleeker, 1863
- Subfamily Procatopodinae Fowler, 1916
  - Aapticheilichthys Huber, 2011
  - Congopanchax Poll, 1971
  - Hylopanchax Poll & Lambert, 1965
  - Hypsopanchax Myers, 1924
  - Laciris Huber, 1981
  - Lacustricola Myers, 1924
  - Lamprichthys Regan, 1911
  - Micropanchax Myers, 1924
  - Plataplochilus Ahl, 1928
  - Platypanchax Ahl, 1928
  - Poropanchax Clausen, 1967
  - Procatopus Boulenger, 1904
  - Rhexipanchax Huber, 1999
