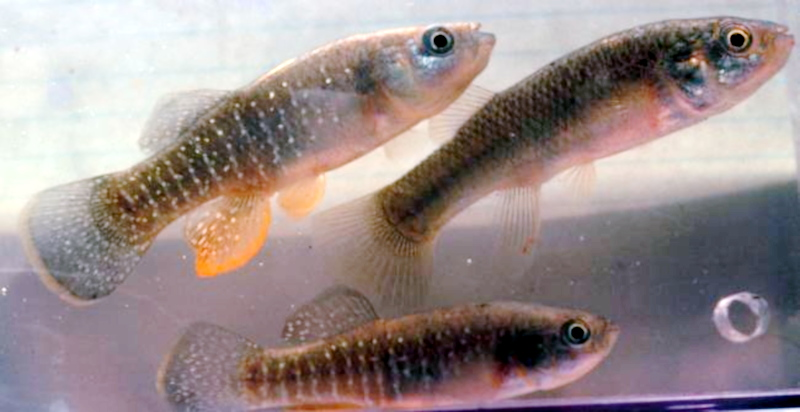
- Mummichog (Fundulus heteroclitus heteroclitus): Female (top right) and two males

Scientific classification
- Kingdom: Animalia
- Phylum: Chordata
- Class: Actinopterygii
- Division: Teleostei
- Clade: Ovalentaria
- Order: Cyprinodontiformes; L. S. Berg, 1940

Type species
- Cyprinodon variegatus Lacépède, 1803

Suborders
- Aplocheiloidei; Cyprinodontoidei

Synonyms
- Microcyprini Regan, 1909

= Cyprinodontiformes =

Cyprinodontiformes Temporal range: Late Paleocene–recent

Order of fishes

Cyprinodontiformes (/ˌsɪprɪnoʊˈdɒntɪfɔːrmiːz/) is an order of ray-finned fish, comprising mostly small, freshwater fish. Many popular aquarium fish, such as killifish and live-bearers, are included. They are closely related to the Atheriniformes and are occasionally included with them. A colloquial term for the order as a whole is toothcarps, though they are not actually close relatives of the true carps – the latter belong to the superorder Ostariophysi, while the toothcarps are Acanthopterygii.

The families of Cyprinodontiformes can be informally divided into three groups based on reproductive strategy: viviparous and ovoviviparous (all species give live birth), and oviparous (all species are egg-laying). The live-bearing groups differ in whether the young are carried to term within (ovoviviparous) or without (viviparous) an enclosing eggshell. Phylogenetically however, one of the two suborders – the Aplocheiloidei – contains oviparous species exclusively, as do two of the four superfamilies of the other suborder (the Cyprinodontoidea and Valencioidea of the Cyprinodontoidei). Vivipary and ovovivipary have evolved independently from oviparous ancestors, the latter possibly twice.

The oldest fossil record of the group is the extinct ?Cyprinodon primulus, a nomen vanum known from isolated fossil scales from the Late Paleocene of Argentina. Its exact taxonomic identity is uncertain, although it is generally considered to at least be a true cyprinodontiform.

== Description ==
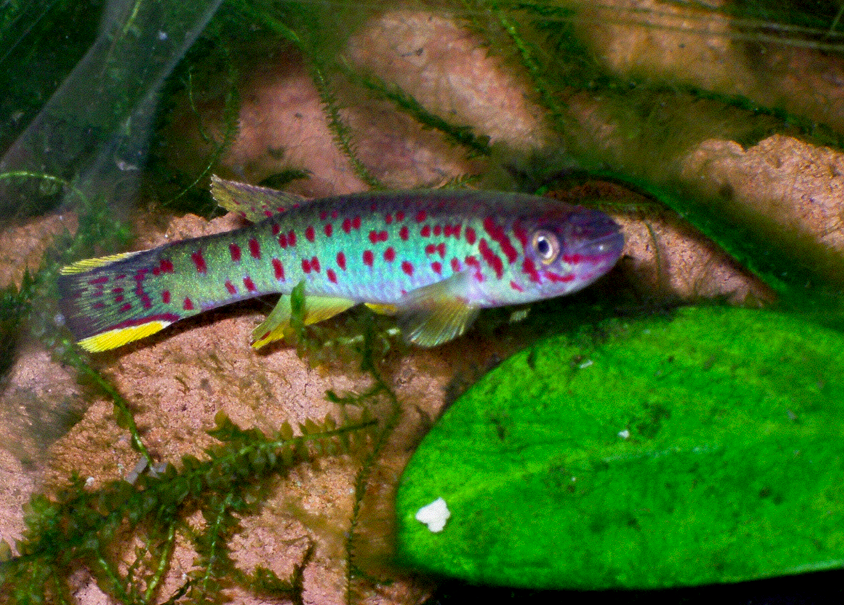
Fundulopanchax scheeli, a killifish of the family Nothobranchiidae.

Some members of this order are notable for inhabiting extreme environments, such as saline or very warm waters, heavily polluted waters, rain water pools devoid of minerals and made acidic by decaying vegetation, or isolated situations where no other types of fish occur.

They are typically carnivores, and often live near the surface, where the oxygen-rich water compensates for environmental disadvantages. Scheel (1968) observed the gut contents were invariably ants, others have reported insects, worms and aquatic crustaceans. Aquarium specimens are invariably seen eating protozoans from the water column and the surfaces of leaves, however these are not apparent as stomach contents. Many members of the family Cyprinodontidae (the pupfishes) eat plant material as well and some have adapted to a diet very high in algae to the point where one, the Flagfish (also known as the American flagfish), is a renowned algae eater in the aquarium, in spite of belonging to an order of fishes that do not generally consume any plant material. In addition, killifish derive some of the carotenoids and other chemicals required to make their body pigments from pollen grains on the surface of and in the gut of insects they eat from the surface of the water; this can be simulated in culture by the use of special color enhancing foods that contain these compounds.

Although the Cyprinodontiformes are a diverse group, most species contained within are small to medium-sized fish, with small mouths, large eyes, a single dorsal fin, and a rounded caudal fin. The largest species is the cuatro ojos (Anableps dowei), which measures 34 cm (13 in) in length, while the smallest, the least killifish (Heterandria formosa), is just 8 mm (0.31 in) long as an adult.

== Systematics ==
Based on Eschmeyer's Catalog of Fishes (2025):

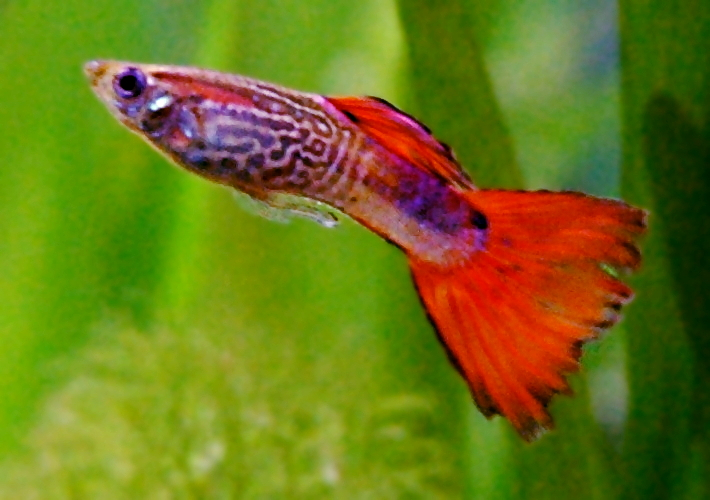
Guppy, a live-bearer of the Poeciliidae

CYPRINODONTIFORMES

- Suborder Aplocheiloidei (all oviparous)
  - Family Aplocheilidae - Asian killifishes
  - Family Nothobranchiidae - African killifishes
  - Family †Kenyaichthyidae (Miocene of Kenya)
  - Family Rivulidae - New World killifishes
- Suborder Cyprinodontoidei
  - Family Pantanodontidae - spine killifishes (oviparous)
  - Family Fundulidae - topminnows (oviparous)
  - Family Cyprinodontidae - pupfishes (oviparous)
  - Family Profundulidae - Middle American killifishes (oviparous)
  - Family Goodeidae - splitfins or goodeids (largely viviparous)
  - Family Fluviphylacidae - American lampeyes (oviparous)
  - Family Anablepidae - four-eyed fish (largely ovoviviparous)
  - Family Poeciliidae - livebearers (viviparous)
  - Family Aphaniidae - Oriental killifishes (oviparous)
  - Family Valenciidae - Valencia toothcarps (oviparous)
  - Family Procatopodidae - African lampeyes (oviparous)

The family Aplocheilidae has been expanded by some authorities to include all the killifishes with three subfamilies, Aplocheilinae, Cynolebiinae and Nothobranchiinae, but this is not the classification adopted in the 5th Edition of Fishes of the World.

=== Phylogeny ===
Based on:

- Cyprinodontiformes
  - Aplocheiloidei
    - Aplocheilidae
    - - Nothobranchiidae
      - Rivulidae
      - †Kenyaichthyidae
  - Cyprinodontoidei
    - Pantanodontidae
    - - Cyprinodontidae
      - - - Profundulidae
          - Goodeidae
        - - Fundulidae
          - - - Fluviphylacidae
              - - Anablepidae
                - Poecilidae
            - - Procatopodidae
              - - Aphaniidae
                - Valenciidae
