= The world's 100 most threatened species =

2012 report by IUCN SSC

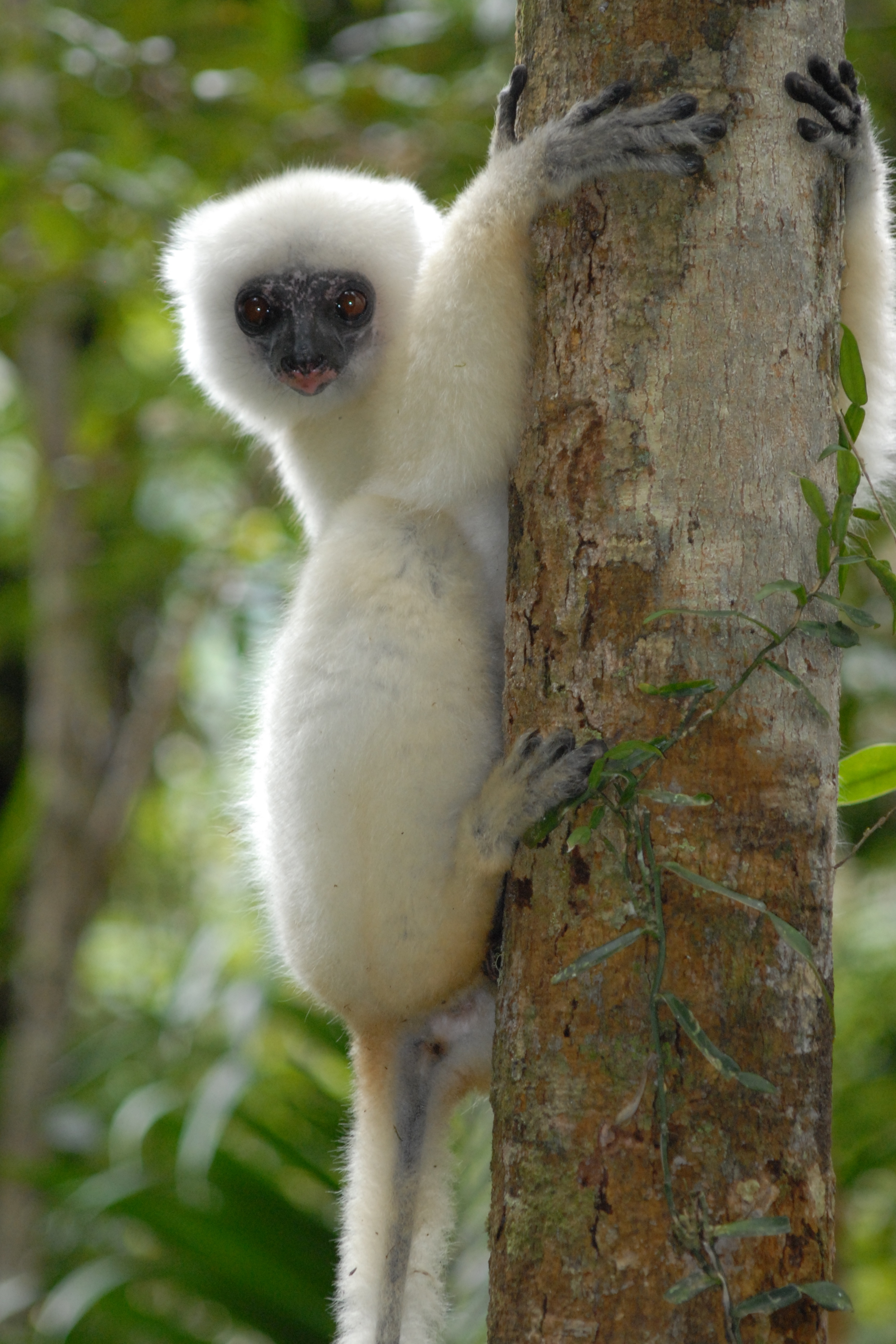
Silky sifaka (Propithecus candidus), fewer than 1,000 still alive

The World's 100 most threatened species is a compilation of the most threatened animals, plants, and fungi in the world. It was the result of a collaboration between over 8,000 scientists from the International Union for Conservation of Nature Species Survival Commission (IUCN SSC), along with the Zoological Society of London. The report was published by the Zoological Society of London in 2012 as the book, Priceless or Worthless?

While all the species on the list are threatened with extinction, the scientists who chose them had another criterion: all the species have no obvious benefit for humans and therefore humans have no vested interests trying to save them. Iconic and charismatic species, such as tigers and pandas—along with economically important species—have many defenders, while these apparently "worthless" species had none. The title of the report, "Priceless or Worthless?", is based on that shared quality of the species. The report's co-author, Ellen Butcher, stated one of the guiding principles of the list, "If we take immediate action we can give them a fighting chance for survival. But this requires society to support the moral and ethical position that all species have an inherent right to exist."

The report was released in Jeju, South Korea, on September 11, 2012, at the quadrennial meeting of IUCN, the World Conservation Congress. At the Congress, it was reported that scientists are finding it more and more common to have to justify funding for protection of species by showing what the human benefits would be. Jonathan Baillie, of the Zoological Society of London and co-author of the report, stated that, "The donor community and conservation movement are increasingly leaning towards a 'what can nature do for us?' approach, where species and wild habitats are valued and prioritised according to these services they provided for people. This has made it increasingly difficult for conservationists to protect the most threatened species on the planet."

Some of the threatened species are down to only a handful of surviving members. Santa Catarina's guinea pig, native to a single island in Brazil, is down to its last 40–60 individuals, reduced by hunting and habitat disturbance. The great Indian bustard is threatened by habitat loss resulting from agriculture and human development, and is down to the last 50–249 individuals. Elaeocarpus bojeri, a flowering plant found only on the island of Mauritius, has fewer than 10 surviving individuals, because of loss of habitat. The Baishan fir (Abies beshanzuensis), native to China, is down to five surviving mature individuals. "Priceless or Worthless?" describes the threats that each species is facing, along with measures that would aid their survival.

== Species list ==
The world's 100 most threatened species
Species	Common name	Type	Image	Location(s)	Estimated population	Threats
Abies beshanzuensis	Baishan fir	Plant (Tree)		Baishanzu Mountain, Zhejiang, China	Three mature individuals	agriculture; fire
Actinote zikani		Insect (butterfly)		Near São Paulo, Atlantic forest, Brazil	Unknown	habitat loss from human expansion
Aipysurus foliosquama	Leaf scaled sea-snake	Reptile		Ashmore Reef and Hibernia Reef, Timor Sea	Unknown	unknown—probably degradation of coral reef habitat
Amanipodagrion gilliesi	Amani flatwing	Insect (damselfly)		Amani-Sigi Forest, Usamabara Mountains, Tanzania	< 500 individuals	population pressure and water pollution
Antisolabis seychellensis		Insect		Morne Blanc, Mahé island, Seychelles	Unknown	invasive species; climate change
Antilophia bokermanni	Araripe manakin	Bird		Chapado do Araripe, South Ceará, Brazil	779 individuals	recreational facilities; water diversion
Aphanius transgrediens	Aci Göl toothcarp	Fish		south-eastern shore of former Lake Aci, Turkey	few hundred pairs	competition and predation by Gambusia; road construction
Aproteles bulmerae	Bulmer's fruit bat	Mammal		Luplupwintern Cave, Western Province, Papua New Guinea	150	hunting; cave disturbance
Ardea insignis	White bellied heron	Bird		Bhutan, North East India and Myanmar	70–400 individuals	hydropower development
Ardeotis nigriceps	Great Indian bustard	Bird		Rajasthan, Gujarat, Maharashtra, Andhra Pradesh, Karnataka and Madhya, India	50–249 mature individuals	agricultural development; energy transmission lines
Astrochelys yniphora	Ploughshare tortoise	Reptile		Baly Bay region, northwestern Madagascar	440–770	illegal collection for international pet trade
Atelopus balios	Rio Pescado stubfoot toad	Amphibian		Azuay, Cañar and Guyas provinces, south-western Ecuador	Unknown	Chytridiomycosis; logging; agricultural expansion
Aythya innotata	Madagascar pochard	Bird		volcanic lakes north of Bealanana, Madagascar	80 mature individuals	agriculture; hunting and fishing; introduced fish
Azurina eupalama	Galapagos damsel fish	Fish		Unknown	Unknown	climate change; oceanographic changes related to the 1982/1983 El Nino
Bahaba taipingensis	Giant yellow croaker	Fish		Chinese coast from Yangtze River, China to Hong Kong	Unknown	over-fishing due to value of swim-bladder in traditional medicine
Batagur baska	Common batagur	Reptile (turtle)		Bangladesh, Cambodia, India, Indonesia and Malaysia	Unknown	illegal export to China
Bazzania bhutanica		Plant		Budini and Lafeti Khola, Bhutan	2 sub-populations	forest clearance; overgrazing; development
Beatragus hunteri	Hirola	Mammal (antelope)		South-east Kenya and possibly south-west Somalia	< 1,000 individuals	habitat loss; competition with livestock; poaching
Bombus franklini	Franklin's bumblebee	Insect (bee)		Oregon and California	Unknown	disease from commercial bees; habitat destruction and degradation
Brachyteles hypoxanthus	Northern muriqui Woolly spider monkey	Mammal (primate)		Atlantic forest, south-eastern Brazil	< 1,000	large-scale deforestation and logging
Bradypus pygmaeus	Pygmy three-toed sloth	Mammal		Isla Escudo de Veraguas, Panama	< 500	illegal logging of mangrove forests for firewood and construction; hunting
Callitriche pulchra		Plant (freshwater)		pool on Gavdos, Greece	Unknown	habitat exploitation by livestock; modification of the pool by locals
Calumma tarzan	Tarzan's chameleon	Reptile		Anosibe An'Ala region, eastern Madagascar	< 100	agriculture
Cavia intermedia	Santa Catarina's guinea pig	Mammal (rodent)		Moleques do Sul Island, Santa Catarina, Brazil	40–60	habitat disturbance; possible hunting; result of having such a small population
Cercopithecus roloway	Roloway guenon	Mammal (primate)		Côte d'Ivoire	Unknown	hunting; habitat loss
Coleura seychellensis	Seychelles sheath-tailed bat	Mammal (bat)		Two small caves on Silhouette and Mahé, Seychelles	< 100	habitat degradation; predation by invasive species
Cryptomyces maximus	Willow blister	Fungi		Pembrokeshire, United Kingdom	Unknown	limited habitat
Cryptotis nelsoni	Nelson's small-eared shrew	Mammal (shrew)		Volcán San Martín Tuxtla, Veracruz, Mexico	Unknown	logging; cattle grazing; fire; agriculture
Cyclura collei	Jamaican iguana Jamaican rock iguana	Reptile		Hellshire Hills, Jamaica	Unknown	habitat destruction; predation by introduced species
Daubentonia madagascariensis	Aye-aye	Mammal (primate)		Deciduous forest, East Madagascar	Unknown	poaching; limited habitat
Dendrophylax fawcettii	Cayman Islands ghost orchid	Plant (orchid)		Ironwood Forest, George Town, Grand Cayman	Unknown	infrastructure development
Dicerorhinus sumatrensis	Sumatran rhino	Mammal (rhino)		Sabah, Sarawak and Peninsular Malaysia, Kalimantan and Sumatra, Indonesia	< 100	hunting (horn is used in traditional medicine)
Diomedea amsterdamensis	Amsterdam albatross	Bird		Breeds on Plateuau des Tourbières, Amsterdam Island, Indian Ocean.	100 mature individuals	disease; incidental by-catch in long-line fishing
Dioscorea strydomiana	Wild yam	Plant		Oshoek area, Mpumalanga, South Africa	200	collection for medicinal use
Diospyros katendei		Plant (tree)		Kasyoha-Kitomi Forest Reserve, Uganda	20 individuals in a single population	agricultural activity; illegal tree felling; alluvial gold digging; small population
Dipterocarpus lamellatus		Plant (tree)		Siangau Forest Reserve, Sabah, Malaysia	12 individuals	logging of lowland forest; creation of industrial plantations
Discoglossus nigriventer	Hula painted frog	Amphibian		Hula Valley, Israel	Unknown	predation by birds; range restriction due to habitat destruction
Dombeya mauritiana		Plant		Mauritius	Unknown	encroachment by invasive plant species; habitat loss due to cannabis cultivation
Elaeocarpus bojeri	Bois Dentelle	Plant (tree)		Grand Bassin, Mauritius	< 10 individuals	habitat degradation
Eleutherodactylus glandulifer	La Hotte glanded frog	Amphibian		Massif de la Hotte, Haiti	Unknown	charcoal production; slash-and-burn agriculture
Eleutherodactylus thorectes	Macaya breast-spot frog	Amphibian		Formon and Macaya peaks, Masif de la Hotte, Haiti	Unknown	charcoal production; slash-and-burn agriculture
Eriosyce chilensis	Chilenito (cactus)	Plant		Pta Molles and Pichidungui, Chile	< 500 individuals	collection of flowering plants
Erythrina schliebenii	Coral tree	Plant		Namatimbili-Ngarama Forest, Tanzania	< 50 individuals	limited habitat and small population size increase vulnerability
Euphorbia tanaensis		Plant (tree)		Witu Forest Reserve, Kenya	4 mature individuals	illegal logging; agricultural expansion; infrastructure development
Eurynorhyncus pygmeus	Spoon-billed sandpiper	Bird		Breeds in Russia, migrates along the East Asian-Australasian Flyway to wintering grounds in India, Bangladesh and Myanmar	100 breeding pairs	trapping; land reclamation
Ficus katendei		Plant		Kasyoha-Kitomi Forest Reserve, Ishasha River, Uganda	< 50 mature individuals	agriculture; illegal tree felling; alluvial gold digging
Geronticus eremita	Northern bald ibis	Bird		Breeds in Morocco, Turkey and Syria. Syrian population winters in central Ethiopia.	about 3000 individuals	habitat degradation and destruction; hunting
Gigasiphon macrosiphon		Plant (flower)		Kaya Muhaka, Gongoni and Mrima Forest Reserves, Kenya, Amani Nature Reserve, West Kilombero Scarp Forest Reserve, and Kihansi Gorge, Tanzania	33	timber extraction; agriculture encroachment and development; predation by wild pigs
Gocea ohridana		Mollusc		Lake Ohrid, Macedonia	Unknown	increasing pollution levels; off-take of water; sedimentation events
Heleophryne rosei	Table mountain ghost frog	Amphibian		Table Mountain, Western Cape Province, South Africa	Unknown	invasive plants; water abstraction
Hemicycla paeteliana		Mollusc (land snail)		Jandia peninsula, Fuerteventura, Canary Islands	Unknown	overgrazing; trampling by goats and tourists
Heteromirafa sidamoensis	Liben lark	Bird		Liben Plains, southern Ethiopia	90–256	agricultural expansion; overgrazing; fire suppression
Hibiscadelphus woodii		Plant (tree)		Kalalau Valley, Hawaii	Unknown	habitat degradation due to feral ungulates; competition with invasive plant species
Hucho perryi	Sakhalin taimen	Fish		Russian and Japanese rivers, Pacific Ocean between Russia and Japan	Unknown	overfishing; damming; agriculture; other land use
Johora singaporensis	Singapore freshwater crab	Crustacean		Bukit Timah Nature Reserve and streamlet near Bukit Batok, Singapore	Unknown	habitat degradation due to reduction in water quality and quantity
Lathyrus belinensis	Belin vetchling	Plant		Outskirts of Belin village, Antalya, Turkey	< 1,000	urbanisation; over-grazing; conifer planting; road widening
Leiopelma archeyi	Archey's frog	Amphibian		Coromandel peninsula and Whareorino Forest, New Zealand	Unknown	Chytridiomycosis; predation by invasive species
Lithobates sevosus	Dusky gopher frog	Amphibian		Harrison County, Mississippi, USA	60–100	fungal disease; climate change; land-use changes
Lophura edwardsi	Edwards's pheasant	Bird		Quang Binh, Quang Tri and Thua Thien-Hue, Viet Nam	Unknown	habitat loss; hunting
Magnolia wolfii		Plant (tree)		Risaralda, Colombia	3	isolation of species; low regeneration rates
Margaritifera marocana		Mollusc		Oued Denna, Oued Abid and Oued Beth, Morocco	< 250	pollution; development
Moominia willii		Mollusc (snail)		Silhouette Island, Seychelles	< 500	invasive species; climate change
Natalus primus	Cuban greater funnel eared bat	Mammal (bat)		Cueva La Barca, Isle of Pines, Cuba	< 100	habitat loss; human disturbance
Nepenthes attenboroughii	Attenborough's pitcher plant	Plant		Mount Victoria, Palawan, Philippines	Unknown	poaching
Nomascus hainanus	Hainan black crested gibbon	Mammal (primate)		Hainan Island, China	20	hunting
Neurergus kaiseri	Luristan newt	Amphibian		Zagros Mountains, Lorestan, Iran	< 1,000	illegal collection for pet trade
Oreocnemis phoenix	Mulanje red damsel	Insect (damselfly)		Mulanje Plateau, Malawi	Unknown	habitat destruction and degradation due to drainage; agricultural expansion; exploitation of forest
Pangasius sanitwongsei	Pangasid catfish	Fish		Chao Phraya and Mekong basins in Cambodia, China, Lao PDR, Thailand and Viet Nam	Unknown	overfishing; collection for aquarium trade
Parides burchellanus		Insect (butterfly)		Cerrado, Brazil	< 100	human expansion; limited range
Phocoena sinus	Vaquita	Mammal (porpoise)		Northern Gulf of California, Mexico	12	capture in fishermen's gillnets
Picea neoveitchii	Type of spruce tree	Plant (tree)		Qinling Range, China	Unknown	destruction of forest
Pinus squamata	Qiaojia pine	Plant (tree)		Qiaojia, Yunnan, China	< 25	limited distribution; small population size
Poecilotheria metallica	Gooty tarantula Metallic tarantula Peacock tarantula Salepurgu	Spider		Nandyal and Giddalur, Andhra Pradesh, India	Unknown	deforestation; firewood collection; civil unrest
Pomarea whitneyi	Fatuhiva monarch	Bird		Fatu Hiva, Marquesas Islands, French Polynesia	50	predation by introduced species - Rattus rattus and feral cats
Pristis pristis	Common sawfish	Fish		Coastal tropical and subtropical waters of Indo-Pacific and Atlantic Oceans. Currently largely restricted to northern Australia	Unknown	exploitation has removed the species from 95 per cent of its historical range
Prolemur simus	Greater bamboo lemur	Mammal (primate)		Southeastern and southcentral rainforests of Madagascar	500	agriculture; mining; illegal logging
Propithecus candidus	Silky sifaka	Mammal (primate)		Maroantsetra to Andapa basin, and Marojeju Massif, Madagascar	100–1,000	hunting; habitat disturbance
Psammobates geometricus	Geometric tortoise	Reptile		Western Cape Province, South Africa	Unknown	loss of habitat destruction; predation
Pseudoryx nghetinhensis	Saola	Mammal		Annamite mountains, on the Viet Nam - PDR Laos border	Unknown	habitat destruction; hunting
Psiadia cataractae		Plant		Mauritius	Unknown	development project; competition from invasive plant species
Psorodonotus ebneri	Beydaglari bush-cricket	Insect		Beydaglari range, Antalaya, Turkey	Unknown	climate change; habitat loss
Rafetus swinhoei	Red River giant softshell turtle	Reptile		Hoan Kiem Lake and Dong Mo Lake, Viet Nam, and Suzhou Zoo, China	3	hunting for consumption; wetland destruction; pollution
Rhinoceros sondaicus	Javan rhino	Mammal (rhino)		Ujung Kulon National Park, Java, Indonesia	< 100	hunting for traditional medicine; small population size
Rhinopithecus avunculus	Tonkin snub-nosed monkey	Mammal (primate)		Northeastern Vietnam	< 200	habitat loss; hunting
Rhizanthella gardneri	West Australian underground orchid	Plant (orchid)		Western Australia, Australia	< 100	land clearance for agriculture; climate change; salinisation
Rhynchocyon spp.	Boni giant sengi	Mammal		Boni-Dodori Forest, Lamu area, Kenya	Unknown	development causing habitat loss
Risiocnemis seidenschwarzi	Cebu frill-wing	Insect (damselfly)		Rivulet beside the Kawasan River, Cebu, Philippines	Unknown	habitat degradation and destruction
Rosa arabica		Plant		St Katherine Mountains, Egypt	Unknown, 10 sub-populations	domestic animal grazing; climate change and drought; medicinal plant collecting; limited range
Salanoia durrelli	Durrell's vontsira	Mammal (mongoose)		Marshes of Lake Alaotra, Madagascar	Unknown	loss of habitat
Santamartamys rufodorsalis	Red crested tree rat	Mammal (rodent)		Sierra Nevada de Santa Marta, Colombia	Unknown	urban development; coffee cultivation
Scaturiginichthys vermeilipinnis	Red-finned blue-eye	Fish		Edgbaston Station, central western Queensland, Australia	2,000–4,000	predation by introduced species
Squatina squatina	Angel shark	Fish		Canary Islands	Unknown	benthic trawling
Sterna bernsteini	Chinese crested tern	Bird		Breeding in Zhejiang and Fujian, China. Outside breeding season in Indonesia, Malaysia, Philippines, Taiwan, Thailand.	< 50	habitat destruction; egg collection
Syngnathus watermeyeri	Estuarine pipefish	Fish		Kariega Estuary to East Kleinemonde Estuary, Eastern Cape Province, South Africa	Unknown	dam construction is altering river flows; flood events into estuaries
Tahina spectabilis	Suicide palm Dimaka	Plant		Analalava district, north-western Madagascar	90	fires; logging; agricultural developments
Telmatobufo bullocki	Bullock's false toad	Amphibian (frog)		Nahuelbuta, Arauco Province, Chile	Unknown	construction of hydro-electricity
Tokudaia muenninki	Okinawa spiny rat	Mammal (rodent)		Okinawa Island, Japan	Unknown	habitat loss; predation by feral cats
Trigonostigma somphongsi	Somphongs's rasbora	Fish		Mae Khlong basin, Thailand	Unknown	farmland conversion and urbanization
Valencia letourneuxi		Fish		Southern Albania and Western Greece	Unknown	habitat destruction; water abstraction; aggressive interaction with Gambusia
Voanioala gerardii	Forest coconut	Plant		Masoala peninsula, Madagascar	< 10	deforestation; harvesting for consumption of palm heart
Zaglossus attenboroughi	Attenborough's echidna	Mammal		Cyclops Mountains, Papua Province, Indonesia	Unknown	habitat modification and degradation; logging; agricultural encroachment shifting cultivation and hunting by local people

== See also ==
- The World's 25 Most Endangered Primates
- Lists of organisms by population
