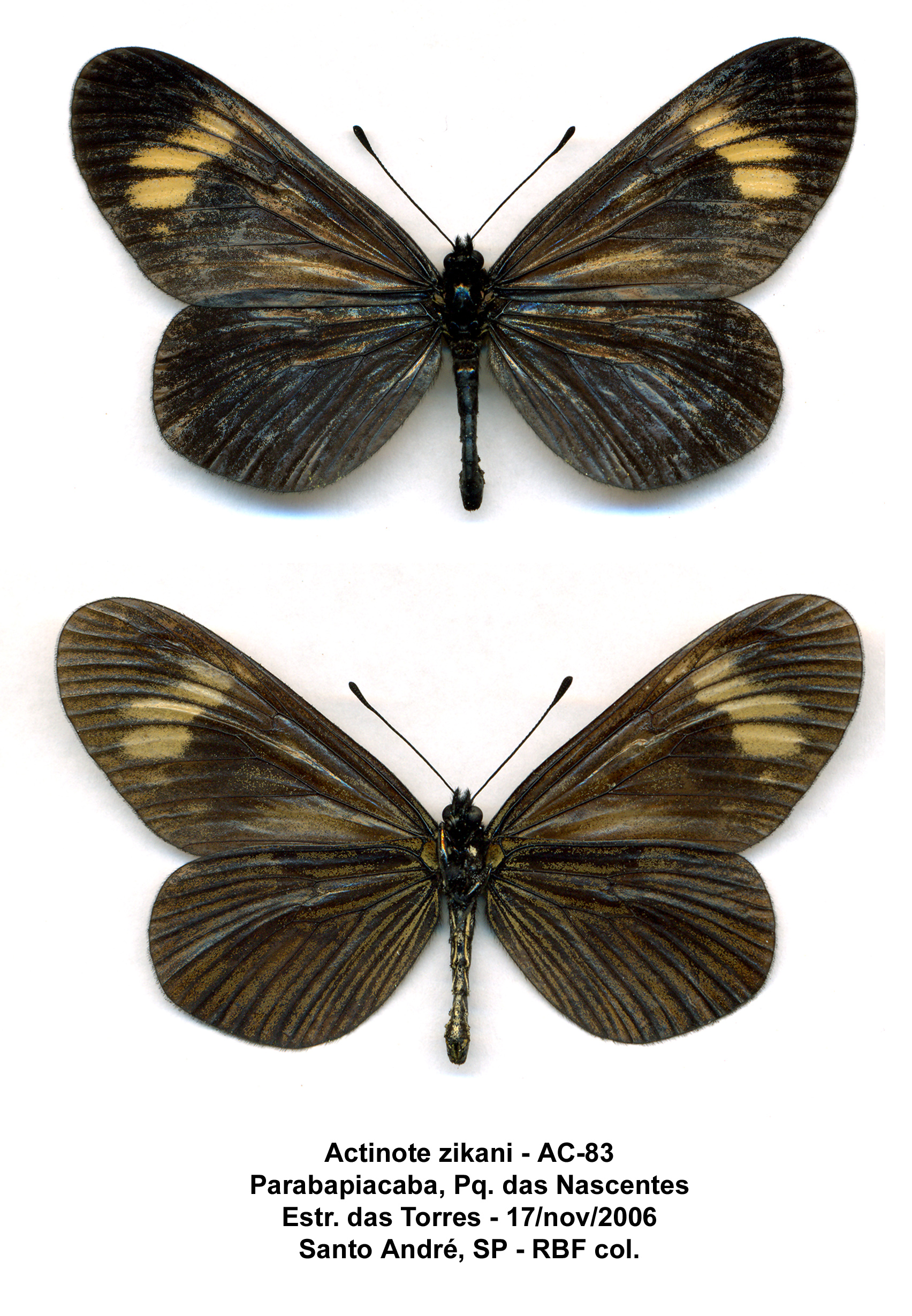

Scientific classification
- Kingdom: Animalia
- Phylum: Arthropoda
- Clade: Pancrustacea
- Class: Insecta
- Order: Lepidoptera
- Family: Nymphalidae
- Genus: Actinote
- Species: A. zikani

Binomial name
- Actinote zikani d'Almeida, 1951

Synonyms
- Acraea zikani (d'Almeida, 1951)

= Actinote zikani =

Critically endangered species of butterfly

Actinote zikani is a species of butterfly belonging to the family Nymphalidae that is endemic to Brazil. Its habitat is the Brazilian Atlantic forest at an altitude of approximately 1,000 metres (3,280 ft), located in the Serra do Mar. Considered extinct after 1981, the species was rediscovered in 1991 in the state of São Paulo, in the southeast of the country.

The species is classified as critically endangered on the national red list of Brazil by the Chico Mendes Institute for Biodiversity Conservation. It is one of two butterflies on the list of the 100 Most Endangered Species in the World published by the International Union for Conservation of Nature (IUCN) and the Zoological Society of London in September 2012, the other being Parides burchellanus.

== Taxonomy ==
Between 1941 and 1942, the naturalist Romualdo Ferreira d'Almeida collected around ten specimens of a species of the genus Actinote at a forested area near Salesópolis in São Paulo and mistakenly attributed them to Actinote morio. According to the remarks of the naturalist J.F. Zikan, d'Almeida corrected his error and described the new species, Actinote zikani, whose characteristics he defined in 1951 (d'Almeida, 1951) based on the specimens he collected and a male reported by Roberto Spitz from Alto da Serra de Santos.

== Description ==
Actinote zikani has iridescent black and opaque wings, similar to Actinote morio. The dorsal and post-medial forewings both have faint yellow markings, and the hindwings have dirty orange markings. The butterfly has a wide clasper, and the clasper grows smaller towards the apex and takes on a triangular shape. One of the characteristics that distinguishes Actinote zikani from Actinote morio are the lighter wing colors that A. zikani typically has, in contrast to the darker wings that A. morio specimens usually exhibit.

Males have a mean forewing length of 33 millimetres (1.3 in), smaller than females which measure 37 millimetres (1.5 in). The mean dry weight of males is 0.41 g, and for females the mean dry weight is 0.74 g. Adults from zikani are usually larger than other species of the Actinote genus.

Actinote zikani eggs are usually yellowish in color when they are first laid, and will change to a red hue after approximately 2 hours have passed. After 16–17 weeks have elapsed since the eggs have been laid, they develop weak horizontal rib markings.

When a specimen is in its early instar phase of development, it develops a smooth, brown head and is pale in color. Later during this phase, specimens take on a yellowish shape, and near the end of this developmental phase are blackish in color, including on the appendages. Pupae are a yellow-green hue after molting, and after several hours change to be more whitish in color.

== Biology ==
=== Flight behavior ===
The activity of A. zikani varies and depends in particular on weather conditions. It begins at sunrise each morning, as the sun illuminates the tops of the forest trees. The butterfly begins by flapping its wings to warm them in the sun before flying away. Flight activity seems to decrease as soon as the sun is veiled.

Males fly more than 2 metres (6.6 ft) above the ground along the road where they were observed, or even above the canopy in the forest. They attack any flying insect located less than a meter from them before rising very quickly or performing a long straight flight of more than 100 metres (330 ft). The small males have been observed attacking other lepidopteran species as large as Morpho hercules.

The host plant of the caterpillar would be one of the sixteen species of Asteraceae discovered during surveys carried out in the Serra do Mar, in particular climbing lianas of the genus Mikania, notably Mikania obsoleta.

=== Mating ===
Mating in A. zikani occurs without any known display of courtship. The seeking male follows a female, and after flying 2 to 5 metres (6.5 to 16.5 ft) in a line about 2 metres (6.6 ft) above ground they make a controlled spiralling flight to the ground, following which the male grasps the female's abdomen with his valvae, forcing copulation on the ground, which may last more than 30 minutes.

=== Sex ratio ===
During observations on the species, it was observed that A. zikani is male-dominated, with a sex ratio of 1.7 males for every female specimen being documented in November 1993.

== Habitat and distribution ==
=== Habitat ===
Distribution of Actinote zikani across Brazil.

The habitat in which the species was rediscovered in 1991 consists of the Brazilian Atlantic forest. The plant environment is mainly made up of bamboos and species of the genus Tibouchina. The stem and trunk of most of the plants are covered with epiphytic mosses and ferns and sixteen species of the Asteraceae family recorded nearby could be, for some of them, the host plants of the Actinote zikani larva.

=== Distribution ===
Actinote zikani is known only in Brazil. The only known distribution area concerns a region of the state of São Paulo, between the towns of Salesópolis and Paranapiacaba around Alto da Serra de Santos, Paranapiacaba and Estação Biológica de Boracéia. The species is also mentioned more anciently in the south of the State of Minas Gerais by its describer, Almeida and a male specimen of the genus Actinote with whitish circular ornamentation was observed in Penedo in the State of Rio de Janeiro in the low hills of the Serra do Itatiaia, but without certainty as to its belonging to the species.

== Disappearance and rediscovery ==
While the species was described in 1951 on the basis of a small number of specimens discovered ten years earlier, field research carried out between 1985 and 1990 to identify new specimens in the typical habitat in April–May and November–December turned out to be a failure. The only evidence of existence of the species is said to be a male specimen observed by Keith Brown in 1981 at the roadside of a rainforest at 1,000 metres (3,280 ft) above sea level between Tapiraí and Sorocaba in the south of the state. Therefore, considered extinct, the species was observed again on March 16, 1991 at the summit of the Serra do Mar 20 kilometres (12 mi) northeast of the city of Santos in São Paulo during a routine visit carried out by Ronaldo Bastos Francini and André Victor Lucci Freitas.

The species was described again in an article published by Francini, Freitas and Brown in the Journal of the Lepidopterists' Society in 2005. The specimens were discovered in the municipality of Santo André (State of São Paulo) near the town of Paranapiacaba along a 2.5 kilometres (1.6 mi) southwest/northeast-oriented concrete block paved road that follows the mountain range between two telecommunications towers on the peaks of Serra do Mar at 1,200 metres (3,900 ft) above sea level.

More than 160 hours of observation were carried out until 2004 near Paranapiacaba and specimens were collected for morphological studies then marked using a small circle of waterproof paper then released. This marking method has also been used successfully, notably on Actinote pellenea and Actinote mamita.

== Protection ==
As early as 1981 and given the rarity of the species, Brown proposed adding A. zikani to the list of species threatened with extinction in Brazil. The species is declared critically endangered by the Secretariat of the Environment in 1998 and the Ministry of the Environment of Brazil in 2003. A. zikani was included by the IUCN in the 100 Most Endangered Species in the World report, and is one of two butterfly species on the list.

== See also ==
- List of critically endangered insects
