= Macroderma =

Macroderma may refer to:

- Macroderma (bat), a genus of bats in the family Megadermatidae
- Macroderma (fungus), a genus of fungi in the family Cryptomycetaceae
