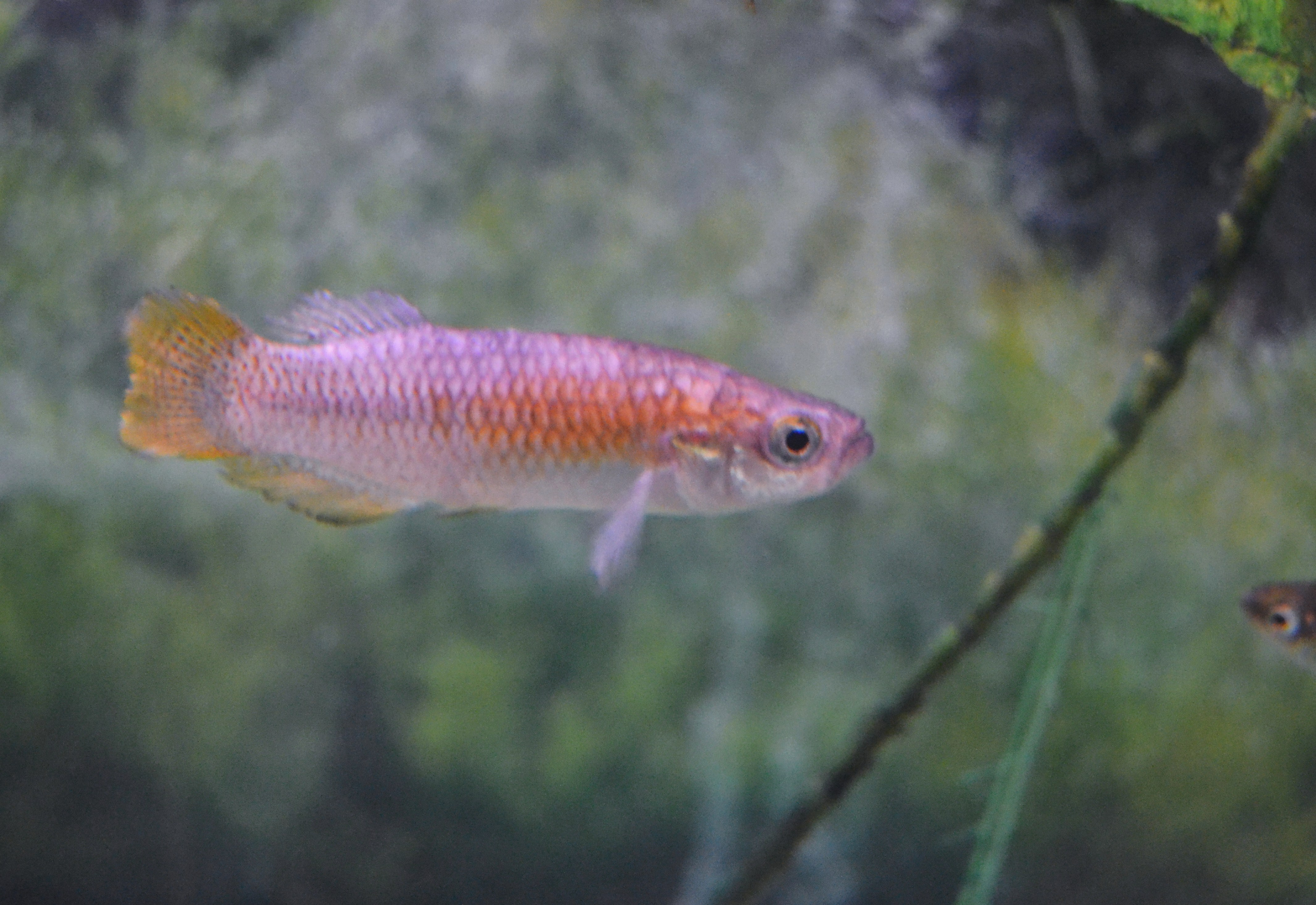

Conservation status
- Vulnerable (IUCN 3.1)

Scientific classification
- Kingdom: Animalia
- Phylum: Chordata
- Class: Actinopterygii
- Order: Cyprinodontiformes
- Family: Valenciidae
- Genus: Valencia
- Species: V. hispanica

Binomial name
- Valencia hispanica (Valenciennes, 1846)
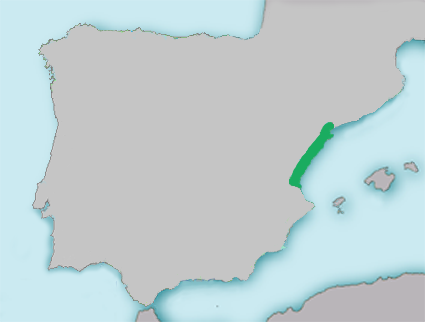

Synonyms
- Hydrargyra hispanica Valenciennes, 1846; Fundulus hispanicus (Valenicennes, 1846)

= Valencia toothcarp =

Species of fish

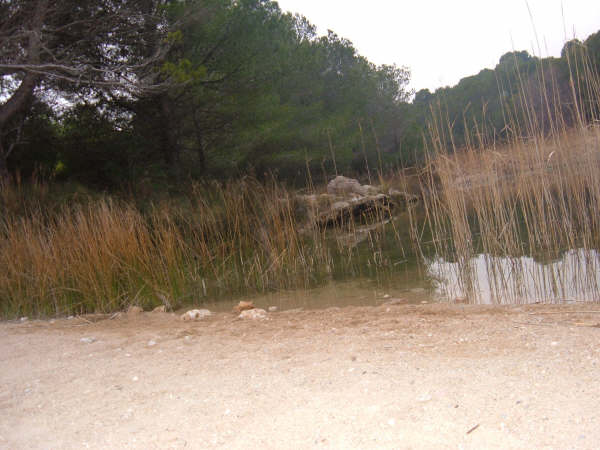
Samaruc habitat, a brackish pond at the mouth of the Torrent del Pi in L'Ametlla de Mar.

The Valencia toothcarp (Valencian: samaruc, scientific name: Valencia hispanica) is a species of freshwater ray-finned fish in the family Valenciidae. It is endemic to southern Catalonia and the Valencian Community, Spain. There is at least one historical record of this species from near Perpignan, France, but the species has since been extirpated from that area.

== Description ==
The Valencia toothcarp is of a light brown to yellow color. Adult males oscillate between 4–8 cm (1.6–3.1 in), and can be distinguished from females by the orangish rims of their fins. In addition, adult females are slightly larger than adult males.

== Habitat ==
The natural habitat of the Valencia toothcarp consists of marshes, freshwater springs, coastal freshwater lagoons, and acequias.

== Biology ==
The Valencia toothcarp is a gregarious species, known to form small shoals. It is carnivorous, feeding on insects, larvae, and worms.

== Conservation status ==
The Valencia toothcarp is listed as a vulnerable species by the Spanish government and the IUCN. Its habitats were lost and populations dwindled as a result of land reclamation, an intense phenomenon in Valencia during the 1980s, attributed to the tourism boom. The increased human population that followed also brought increased pollution and introduced species, making their numbers plummet further.

Recently, the Valencia toothcarp has been the object of a conservation and reintroduction program spearheaded by the Valencian regional government, which aims to reverse further declines. As part of that program, this species is bred by the l'Oceanogràfic aquarium in Valencia (which also puts this species on exhibition) and other institutions, and thousands of individuals have been released alongside the also-endangered European pond turtle into the nearby l'Albufera lagoon in the last few years.

== See also ==
- Valencia letourneuxi
- Fartet
