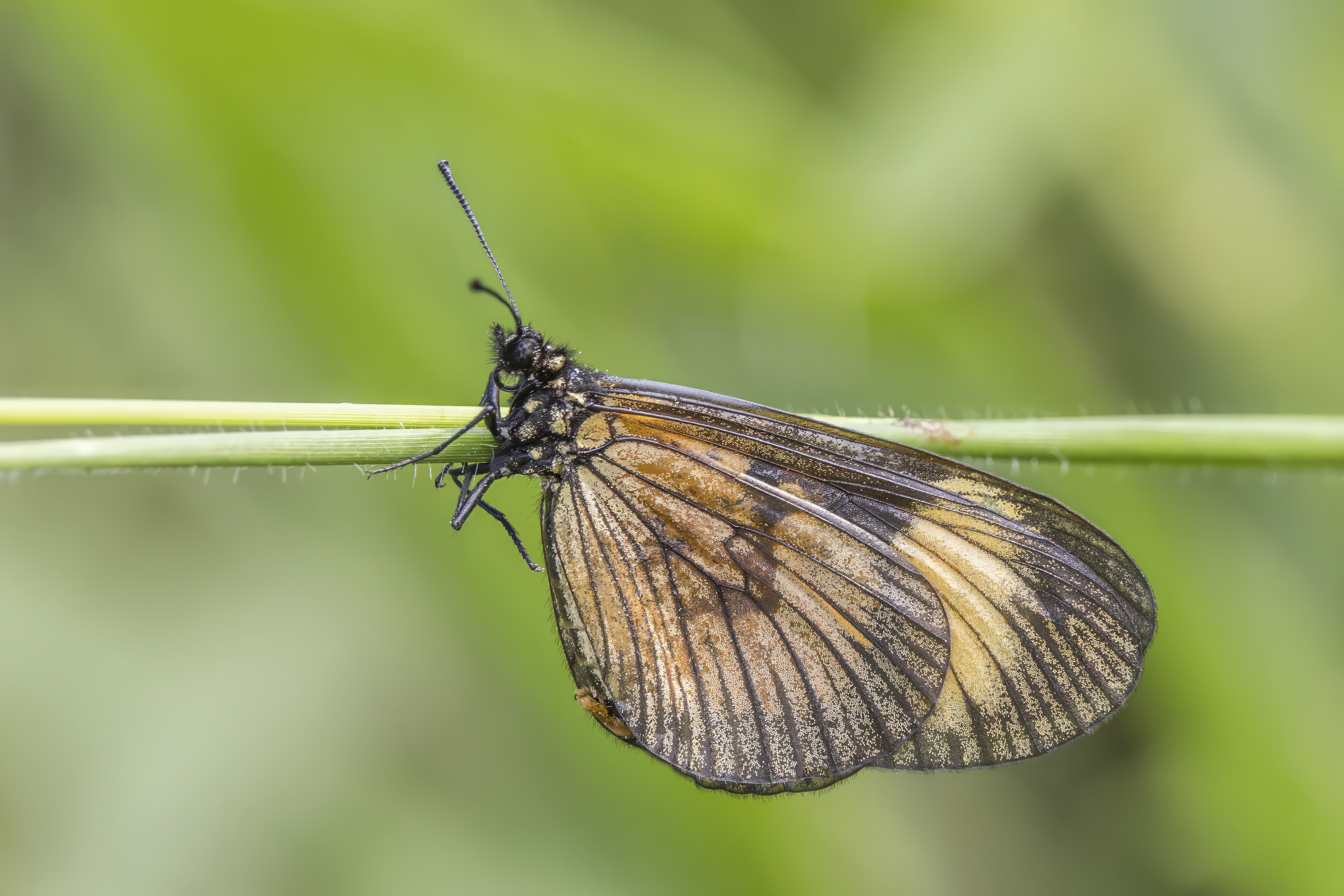

Scientific classification
- Domain: Eukaryota
- Kingdom: Animalia
- Phylum: Arthropoda
- Class: Insecta
- Order: Lepidoptera
- Family: Nymphalidae
- Subfamily: Heliconiinae
- Tribe: Acraeini
- Genus: Actinote
- Species: A. anteas

Binomial name
- Actinote anteas Doubleday, 1847

= Actinote anteas =

Species of butterfly

Actinote anteas is a species of butterfly of the genus Actinote. The species is largely observed in Central America and Colombia. The species has also been brought into Indonesia.
