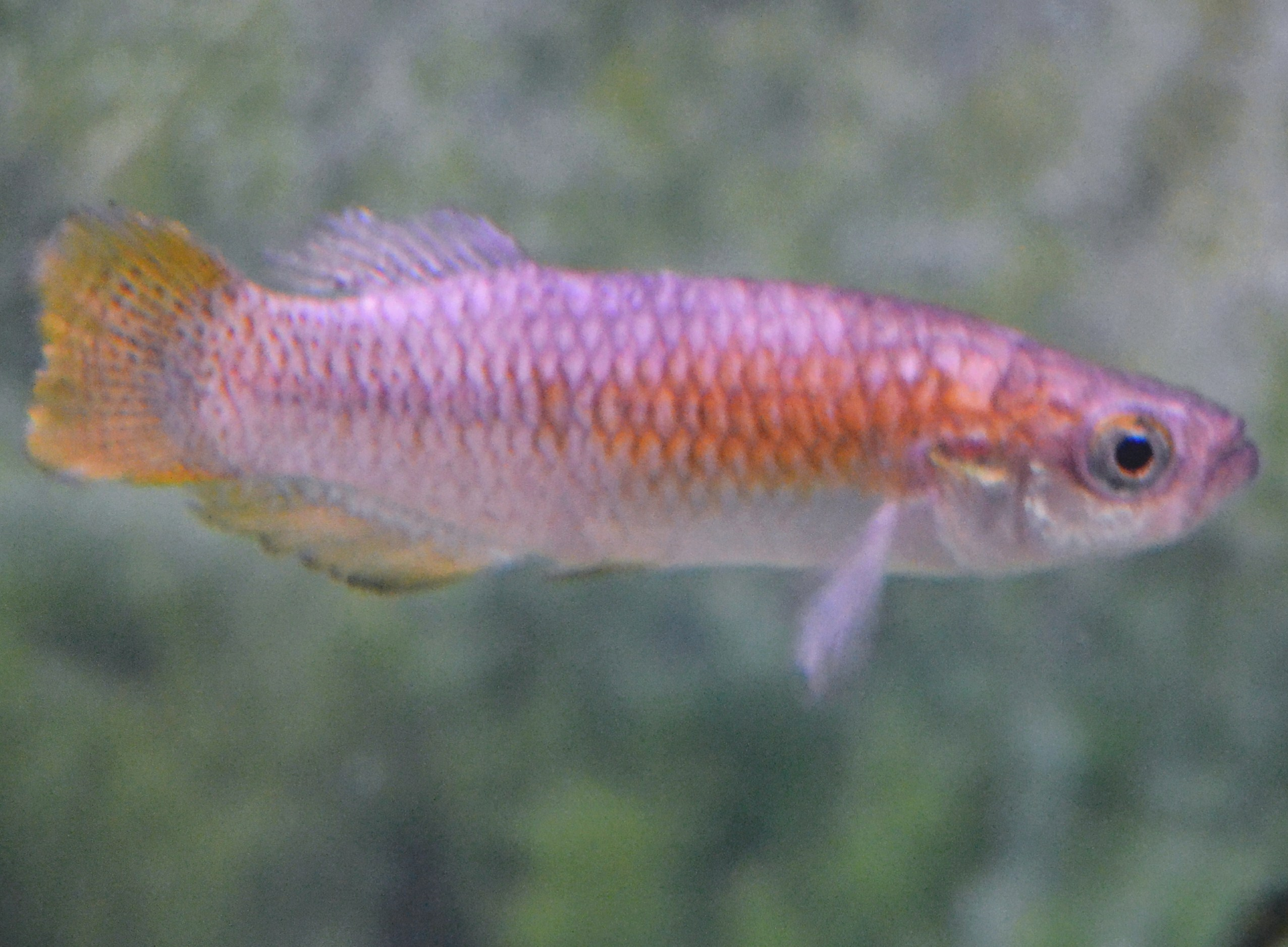
- Valencia hispanica

Scientific classification
- Kingdom: Animalia
- Phylum: Chordata
- Class: Actinopterygii
- Order: Cyprinodontiformes
- Suborder: Cyprinodontoidei
- Family: Valenciidae; Parenti, 1981
- Genus: Valencia; G. S. Myers, 1928

Type species
- Hydrargyra hispanica Valenciennes, 1846

= Valencia (fish) =

Valencia Temporal range: Early Oligocene–present

Genus of fishes

Valencia is the only extant genus in the family Valenciidae. Valencia is a genus of ray-finned fishes. It was formerly grouped into the family Cyprinodontidae, but more recent studies support it being its own family most closely related to the Aphaniidae. Members of this genus are restricted to southern Europe.

== Taxonomy ==
There are currently three recognized species in Valencia:

- Valencia hispanica (Valenciennes, 1846) (Valencia toothcarp)
- Valencia letourneuxi (Sauvage, 1880) (Corfu toothcarp)
- Valencia robertae Freyhof, Kärst & Geiger, 2014

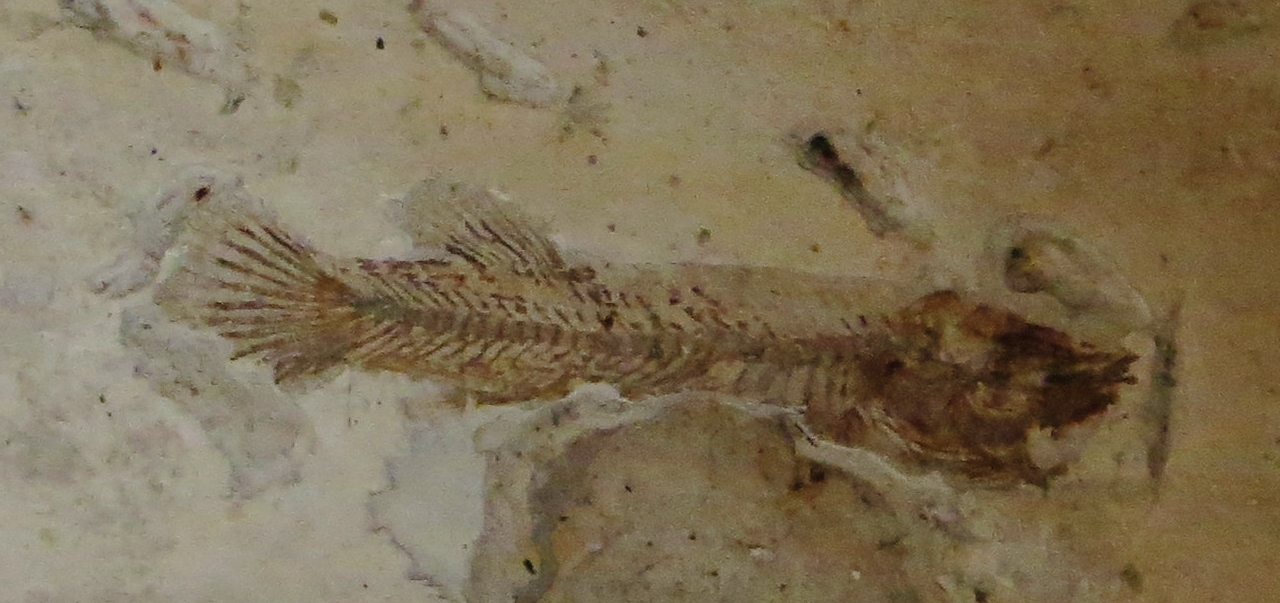
Fossil specimen of Prolebias, an extinct valenciid

The Valenciidae were formerly a much more diverse lineage in prehistoric times (Paleogene to mid-Neogene). The following fossil genera are also known:

- †Aphanolebias Reichenbacher & Gaudant, 2003
- †Francolebias Costa, 2012
- †Miovalencia Mainero, Vasilyan & Reichenbacher, 2024
- †Prolebias Sauvage, 1874
- †Wilsonilebias Mainero, Vasilyan & Reichenbacher, 2024

This group has a rich fossil record dating to the Early Oligocene. Their evolution was driven by shifts in the Mediterranean and the Paratethys Seas.
