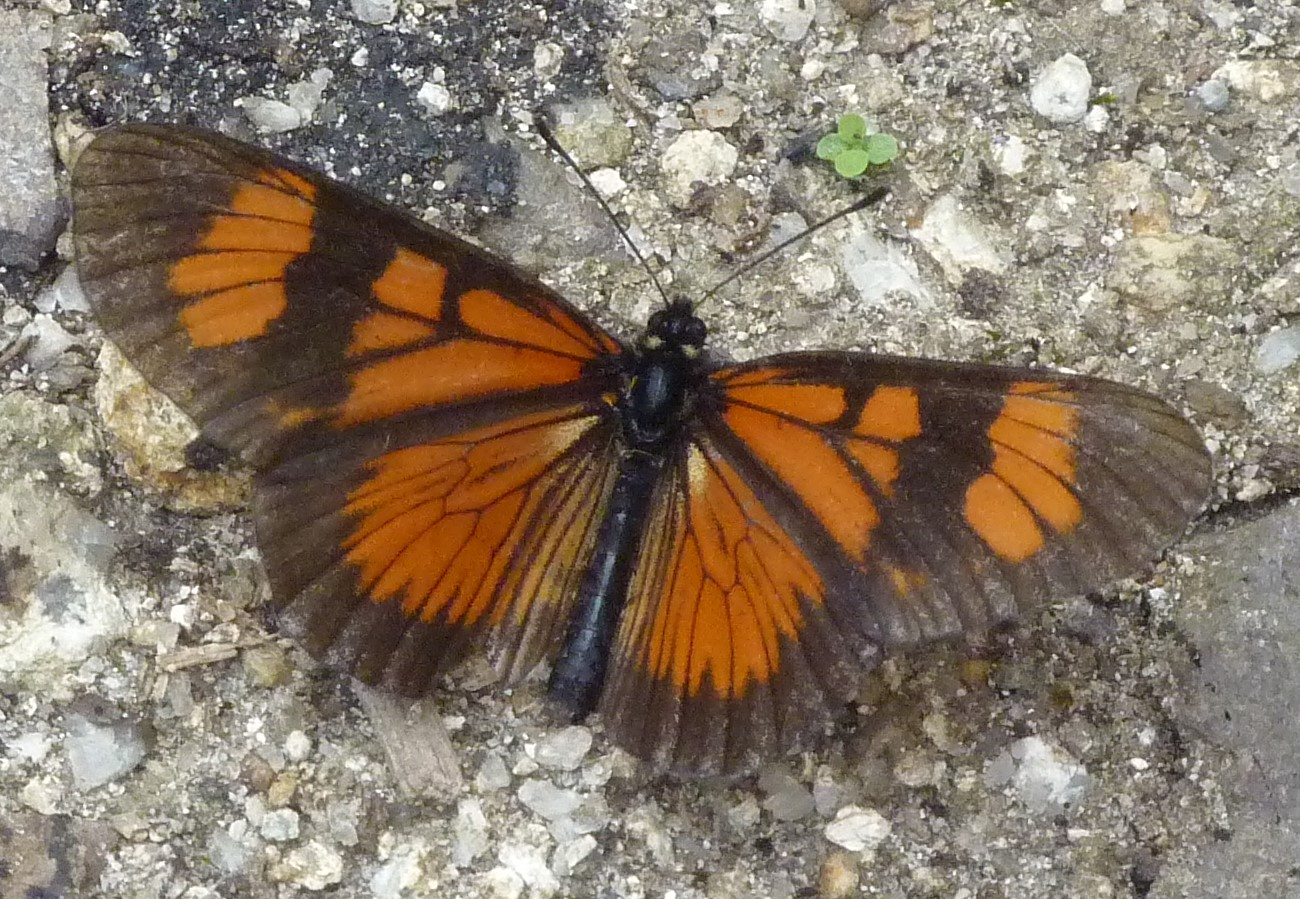

Scientific classification
- Domain: Eukaryota
- Kingdom: Animalia
- Phylum: Arthropoda
- Class: Insecta
- Order: Lepidoptera
- Family: Nymphalidae
- Subfamily: Heliconiinae
- Species: A. rufina

Binomial name
- Actinote rufina Oberthür, 1917

= Actinote rufina =

Species of butterfly

Actinote rufina is a species of butterfly of the genus Actinote. The species is endemic to Peru, and has been sparsely documented in mountains west of the Madre de Dios River in Bolivia.
