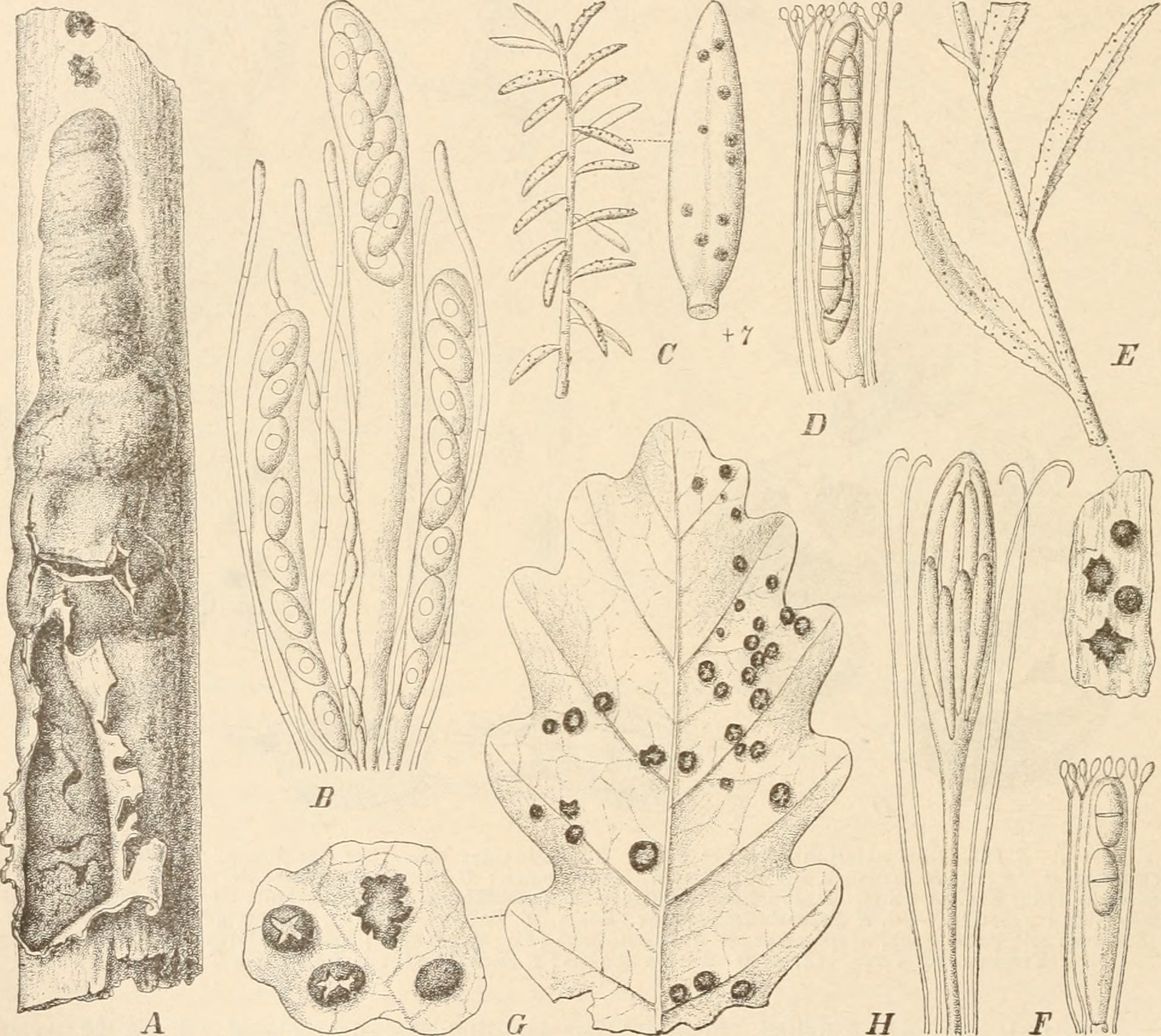
- Depiction of fruiting bodies
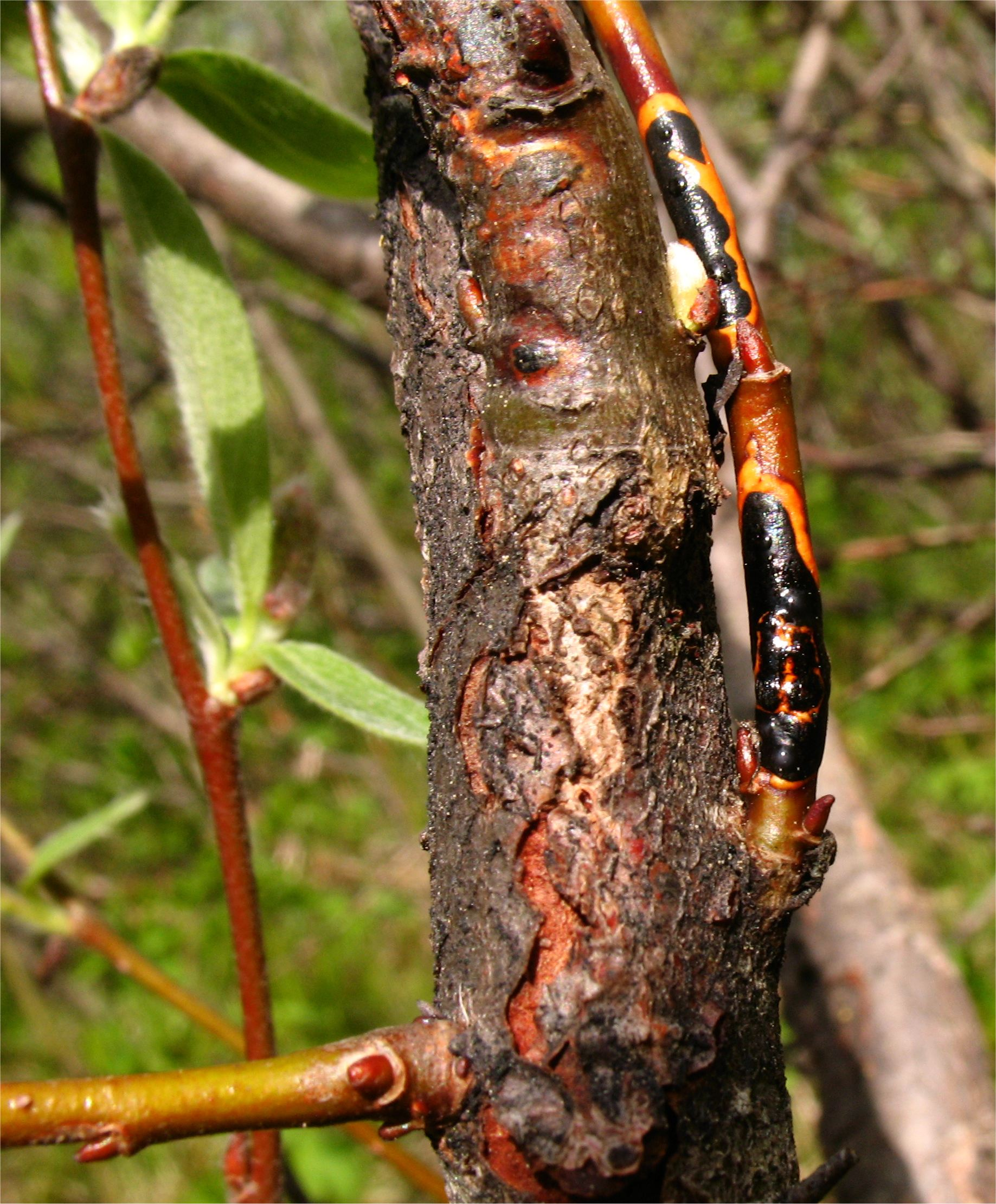
- Image of fruiting bodies

Scientific classification
- Kingdom: Fungi
- Division: Ascomycota
- Class: Leotiomycetes
- Order: Rhytismatales
- Family: Cryptomycetaceae
- Genus: Cryptomyces
- Species: C. maximus

Binomial name
- Cryptomyces maximus (Fr.) Rehm

= Cryptomyces maximus =

Species of fungus

Cryptomyces maximus (commonly known as willow blister) is a species of fungus within the genus Cryptomyces.

Cryptomyces maximus is the only species listed on The world's 100 most threatened species as being native to the British Isles.

== Climate ==
Cryptotomyces maximus is a species of fungus comes from willow species as discovered in Finland in 1913. It prefers to live in damp and humid environments such as swamps. They can be found in a variety of different climates also so it is not just bound to one. They prefer both alpine and mountainous areas, along with the lowlands of Germany and the UK.
