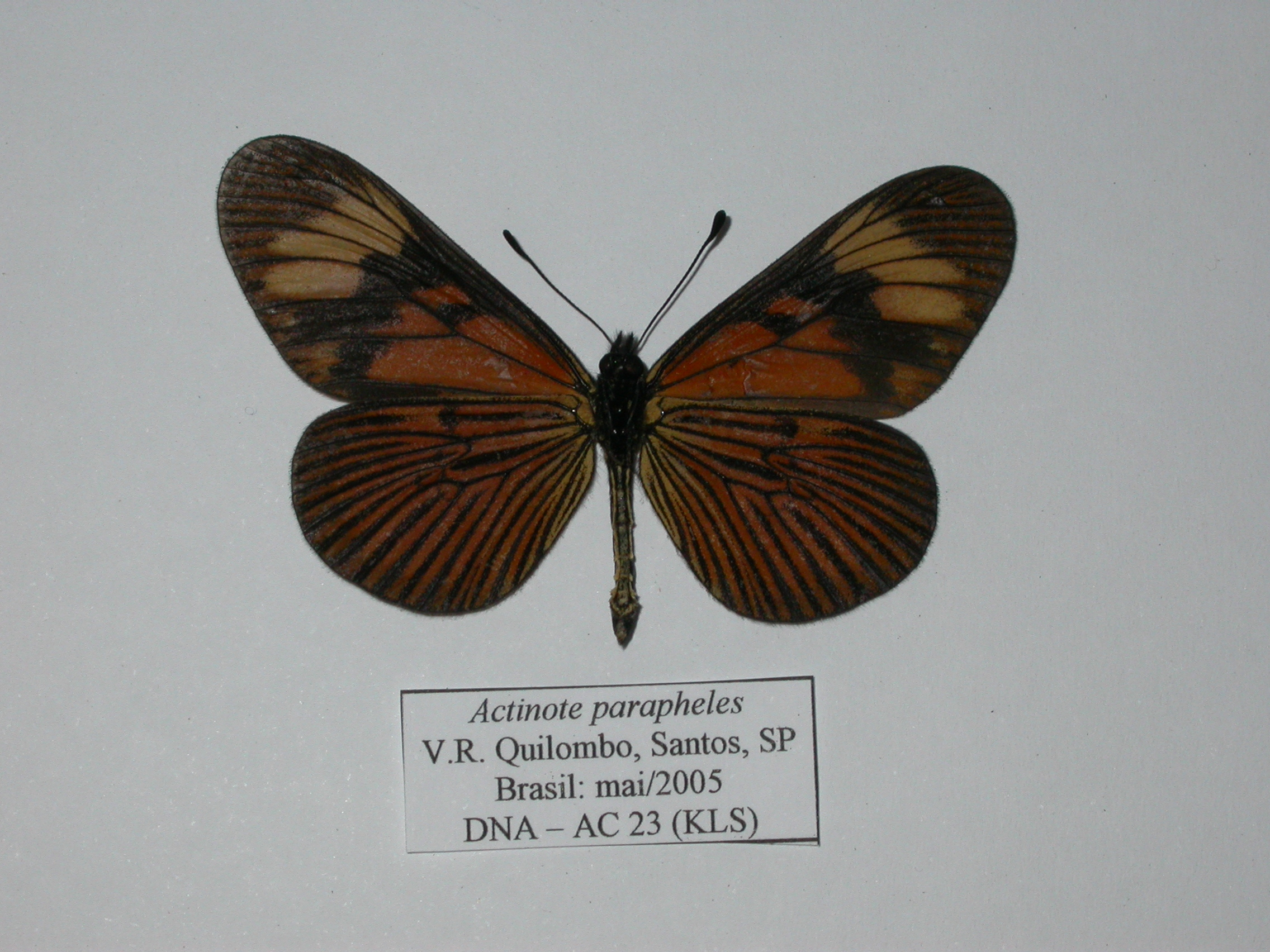

Scientific classification
- Domain: Eukaryota
- Kingdom: Animalia
- Phylum: Arthropoda
- Class: Insecta
- Order: Lepidoptera
- Family: Nymphalidae
- Genus: Actinote
- Species: A. parapheles

Binomial name
- Actinote parapheles Jordan, 1913

= Actinote parapheles =

Species of butterfly

Actinote parapheles is a species of butterfly of the genus Actinote. The species has a maximum wingspan of ~55 millimeters.
