= Valencia robertae =

Scientific classification
- Kingdom: Animalia
- Phylum: Chordata
- Class: Actinopterygii
- Order: Cyprinodontiformes
- Family: Valenciidae
- Genus: Valencia
- Species: V. robertae

Binomial name
- Valencia robertae Freyhof, Kärst & Geiger, 2014

Species of fish

Valencia robertae is a species of Mediterranean killifish, from the family Valenciidae. It is endemic to Greece where it is found in the Lower Pinios and lower Mornos Rivers in Greece. The species was described in 2004 with the type locality given as River Pinios south of Kavasila. The specific name honours the Italian ichthyologist Roberta Barbieri of the Hellenic Centre for Marine Research in Athens.
