= Pseudorhytisma =

Scientific classification
- Kingdom: Fungi
- Division: Ascomycota
- Class: Leotiomycetes
- Order: Rhytismatales
- Family: Cryptomycetaceae
- Genus: Pseudorhytisma; Juel
- Species: P. bistortae

Binomial name
- Pseudorhytisma bistortae (DC.) Juel

Genus of fungi

Pseudorhytisma is a genus of fungi within the Cryptomycetaceae family. This is a monotypic genus, containing the single species Pseudorhytisma bistortae.
