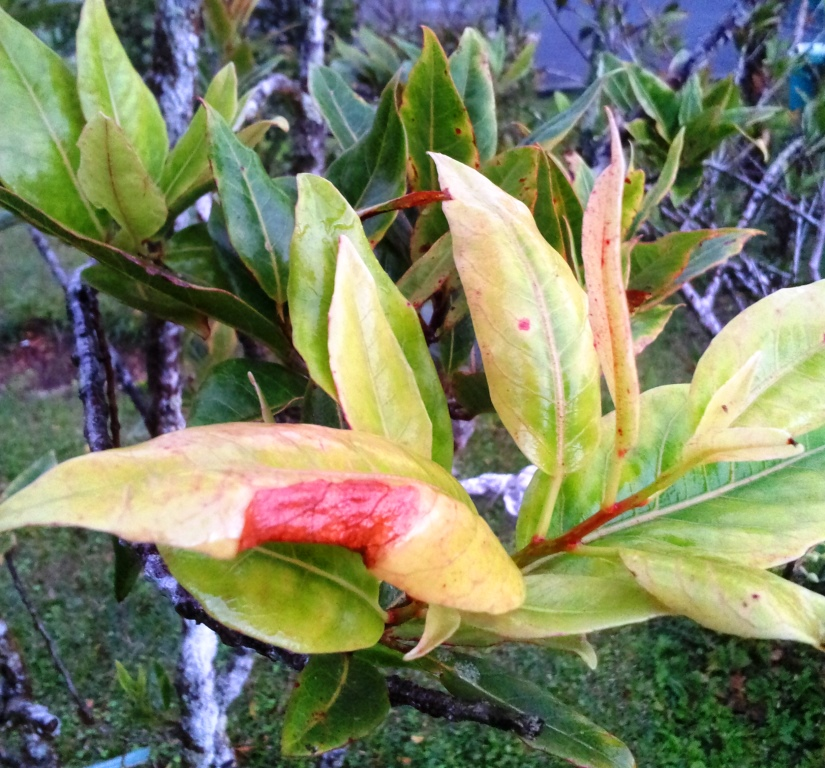

Conservation status
- Critically Endangered (IUCN 2.3)

Scientific classification
- Kingdom: Plantae
- Clade: Tracheophytes
- Clade: Angiosperms
- Clade: Eudicots
- Clade: Rosids
- Order: Oxalidales
- Family: Elaeocarpaceae
- Genus: Elaeocarpus
- Species: E. bojeri

Binomial name
- Elaeocarpus bojeri R.E. Vaughan

= Elaeocarpus bojeri =

Species of flowering plant

Elaeocarpus bojeri, locally known as a bois dentelle ('lace wood' in French), descriptive of its delicate white flowers, is a species of flowering plant in the Elaeocarpaceae family. The species was once only found close to an Indian temple on Piton Grand Bassin hill near Grand Bassin in Mauritius, where only two individuals were known to grow in the 1990s.

== Conservation ==
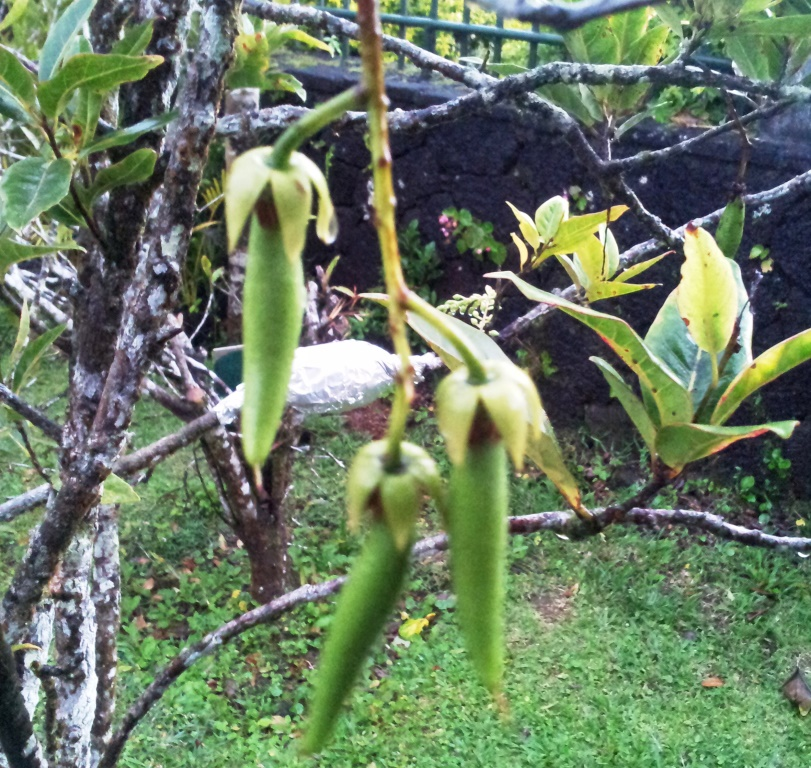
Elaeocarpus bojeri seed pods, in the gardens of Monvert Nature Park

In a report published by International Union for Conservation of Nature Species Survival Commission (IUCN SSC), along with the Zoological Society of London, E. bojeri was termed as one of the hundred most threatened species in the world.

It is not threatened because of being exploited itself, rather because its environment is being overrun by more commercially attractive alien species such as Psidium cattleyanum and Litsea monopetala.

== See also ==
- List of Elaeocarpus species
