= Potebniamyces =

Scientific classification
- Kingdom: Fungi
- Division: Ascomycota
- Class: Leotiomycetes
- Order: Rhytismatales
- Family: Cryptomycetaceae
- Genus: Potebniamyces; Smerlis

Type species
- Potebniamyces discolor (Mouton & Sacc.) Smerlis

Species
- Potebniamyces balsamicola Potebniamyces gallicola Potebniamyces pyri

Genus of fungi

Potebniamyces is a genus of fungi within the Cryptomycetaceae family.
