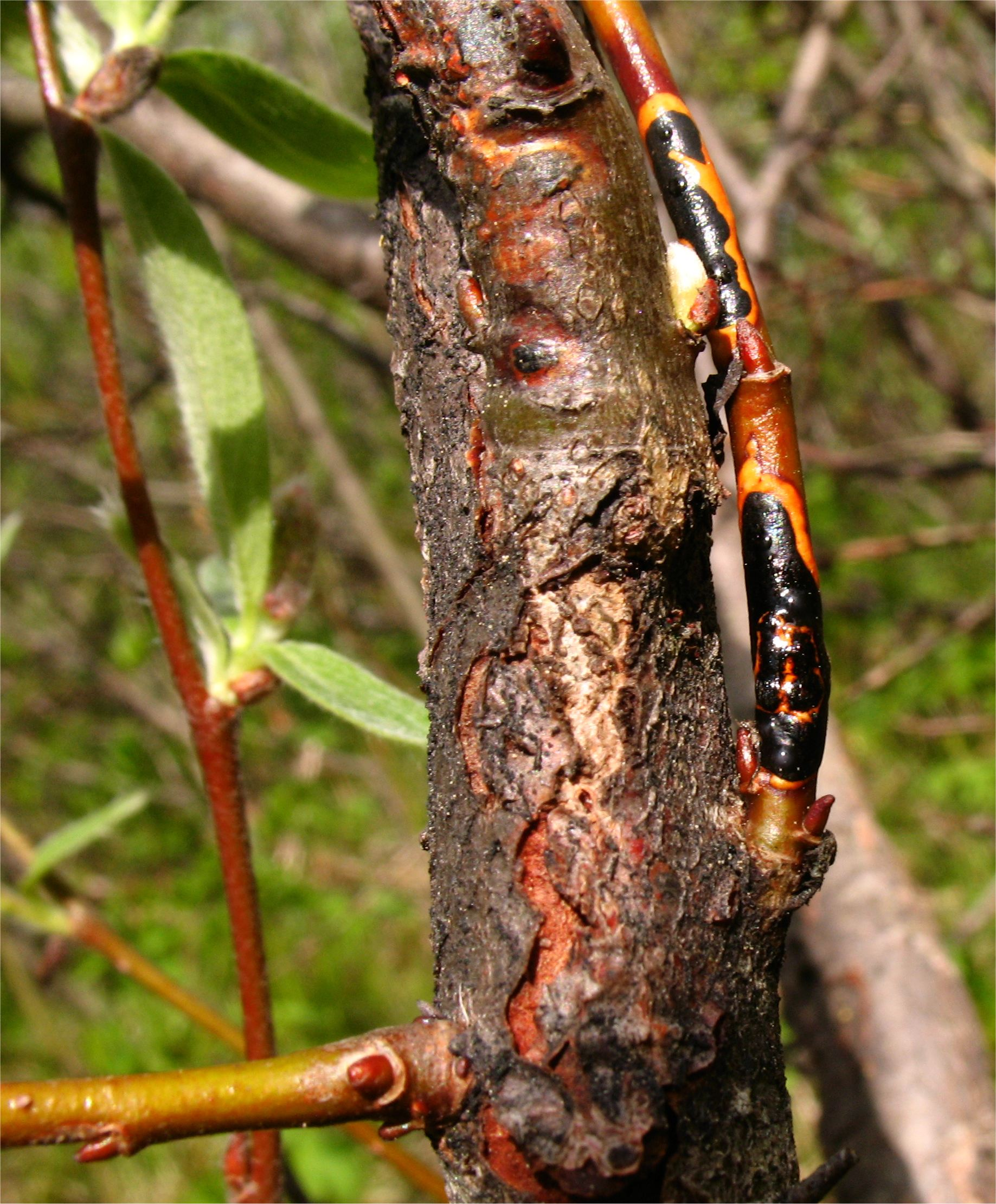
- Cryptomyces maximus

Scientific classification
- Kingdom: Fungi
- Division: Ascomycota
- Class: Leotiomycetes
- Order: Rhytismatales
- Family: Cryptomycetaceae
- Genus: Cryptomyces; Grev.

Type species
- Cryptomyces wauchii Grev.

= Cryptomyces =

Genus of fungi

Cryptomyces is a genus of fungi within the Cryptomycetaceae family. The searches throughout Europe that have been conducted for this fungi since 2000 revealed sites only in Southwest Wales, Slovakia, and Northern Sweden.
