= Ficus katendei =

Scientific classification
- Kingdom: Plantae
- Clade: Tracheophytes
- Clade: Angiosperms
- Clade: Eudicots
- Clade: Rosids
- Order: Rosales
- Family: Moraceae
- Genus: Ficus
- Subgenus: F. subg. Urostigma
- Species: F. katendei

Binomial name
- Ficus katendei Verdc.

Species of flowering plant

Ficus katendei is a rare species of fig in the family Moraceae native to southwest Uganda. Discovered in 1998, it is named after a Mr. Katende of Makerere University who was the original specimen collector. It is listed as one of the world's 100 most threatened species by the IUCN. Like many figs, it initially grows as an epiphyte and then later develops in to a freestanding tree, and inhabits riparian forest as well as lower montane forest.
