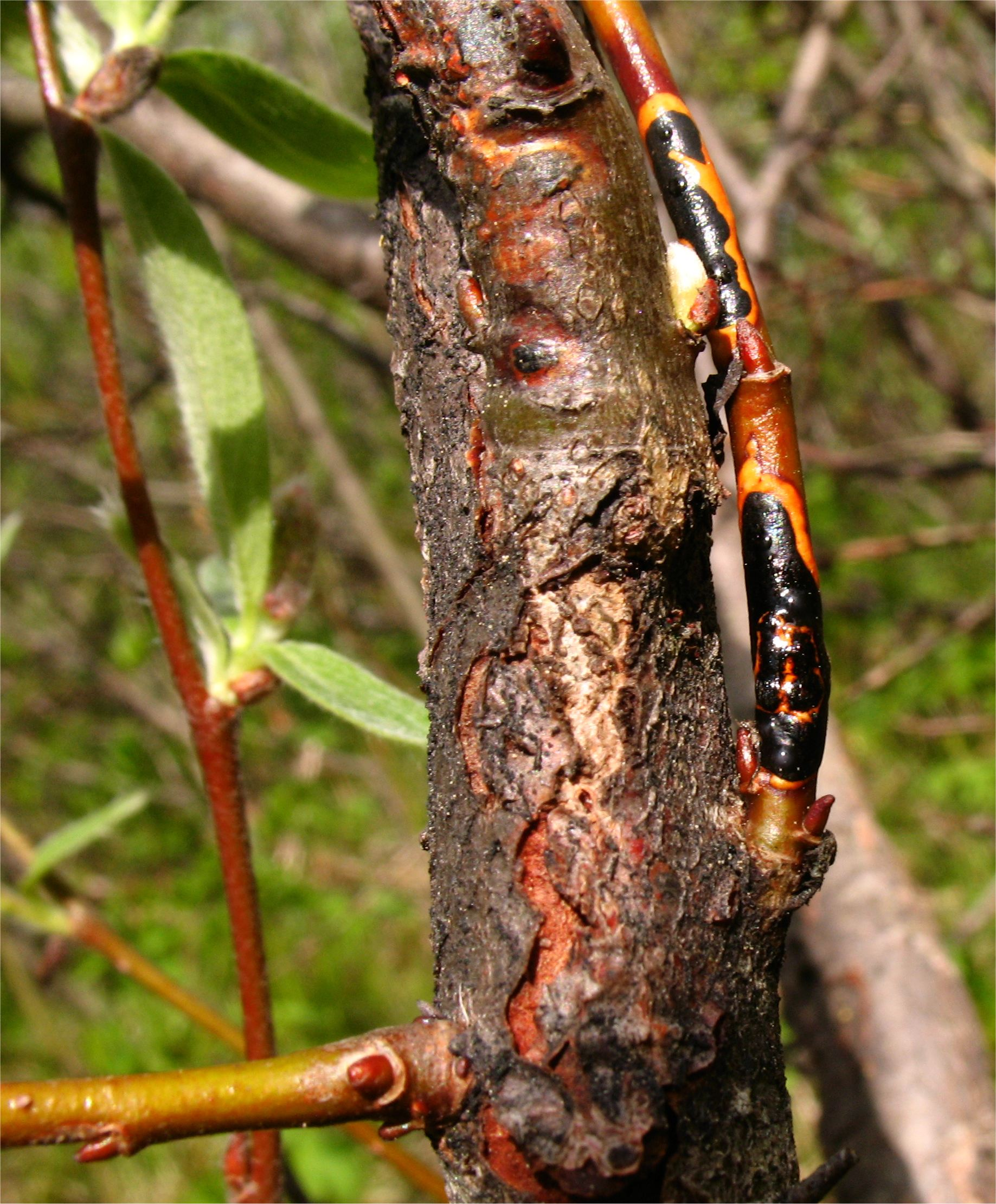
- Cryptomyces maximus

Scientific classification
- Kingdom: Fungi
- Division: Ascomycota
- Class: Leotiomycetes
- Order: Rhytismatales
- Family: Cryptomycetaceae; Höhn.

Type genus
- Cryptomyces Grev.

Genera
- Cryptomyces; Macroderma; Potebniamyces – tentative Pseudorhytisma

= Cryptomycetaceae =

Family of fungi

The Cryptomycetaceae are a family of fungi in the Rhytismatales order.
