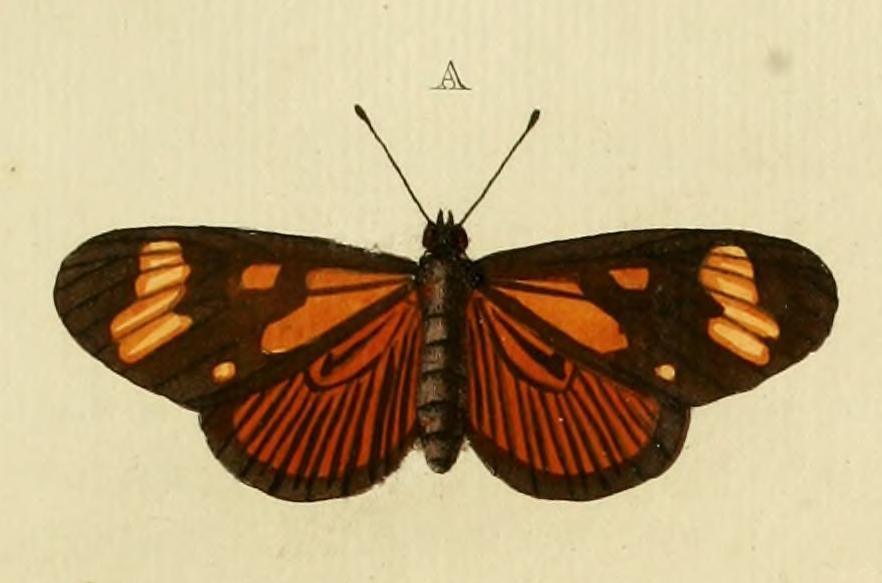

Scientific classification
- Kingdom: Animalia
- Phylum: Arthropoda
- Clade: Pancrustacea
- Class: Insecta
- Order: Lepidoptera
- Family: Nymphalidae
- Genus: Actinote
- Species: A. thalia

Binomial name
- Actinote thalia (Linnaeus, 1758)

Synonyms
- Papilio thalia Linnaeus, 1758; Papilio ixilion Linnaeus, 1758; Acraea acton Herrich-Schäffer, 1865; Actinote thalia ab. idiographa Jordan, 1913; Acraea anteas Doubleday, [1847]; Actinote anteas anteas f. holochrea Jordan, 1913; Actinote anteas anteas f. ochrotaenia Jordan, 1913; Acraea terpsinoe C. & R. Felder, 1862; Acraea crassinia Hopffer, 1874; Actinote terpsinoë roqueensis Bryk, 1953; Actinote terpsinoë roqueensis f. puricella Bryk, 1953; Actinote cedestis Jordan, 1913; Actinote crassinia eupelia Jordan, 1913; Actinote cedestes suspecta Jordan, 1913; Actinote brettia Oberthür, 1917

= Actinote thalia =

Species of butterfly

Actinote thalia is a species of butterfly of the family Nymphalidae. It was described by Carl Linnaeus in the 1758 10th edition of Systema Naturae. It is found in most of South America. An attempt was made by the South African programme to defoliate the Chromolaena odorata, a shrub of Neotropical origin, by this species, but was disqualified due to an unacceptably wide host range.

The larvae feed on Mikania species, Eupatorium odoratum and Chromolaena odoratum.

== Subspecies ==
- A. t. thalia (Suriname, Venezuela)
- A. t. anteas (Doubleday, [1847]) (Mexico, Costa Rica, Honduras, Guatemala, Panama, Venezuela, Colombia)
- A. t. brettia Oberthür, 1917 (Colombia)
- A. t. byssa Oberthür, 1917 (Venezuela)
- A. t. cedestis Jordan, 1913 (Ecuador)
- A. t. crassinia (Hopffer, 1874) (Peru, Bolivia)
- A. t. eupelia Jordan, 1913 (Bolivia, Argentina)
- A. t. suspecta Jordan, 1913 (Ecuador)
- A. t. terpsinoe (C. & R. Felder, 1862) (Peru, Bolivia)
