= Nelson's small-eared shrew =

Conservation status
- Critically Endangered (IUCN 3.1)

Scientific classification
- Kingdom: Animalia
- Phylum: Chordata
- Class: Mammalia
- Order: Eulipotyphla
- Family: Soricidae
- Genus: Cryptotis
- Species: C. nelsoni

Binomial name
- Cryptotis nelsoni Merriam, 1895
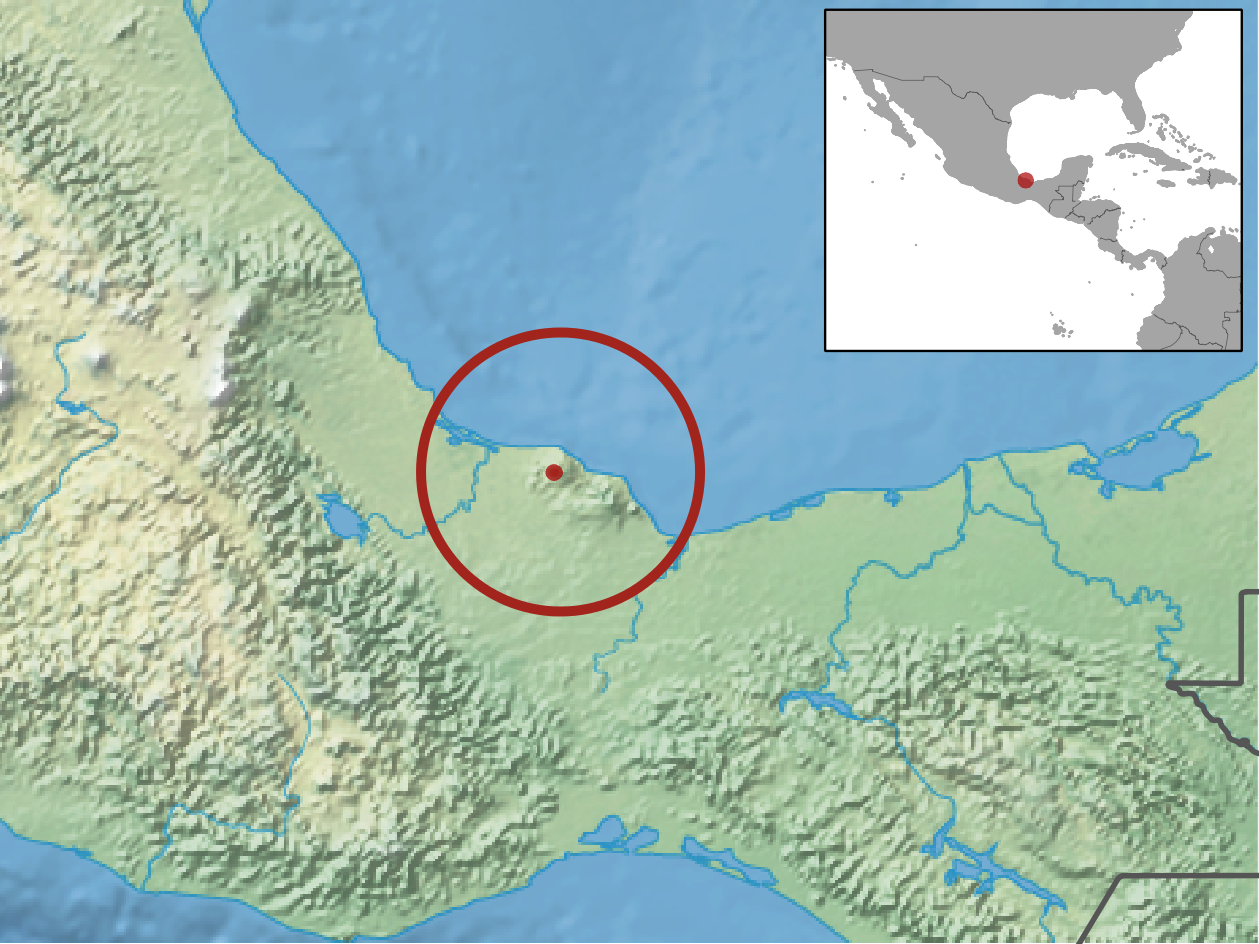
- Nelson's small-eared shrew range

Species of mammal

Nelson's small-eared shrew (Cryptotis nelsoni) is a species of mammal in the family Soricidae. It is endemic to eastern Mexico.

The species was discovered by Edward William Nelson and Edward Alphonso Goldman in 1894, who collected a number of specimens from the slopes of the San Martín volcano in the Mexican state of Veracruz. The species was then not recorded again, and thought by many to be extinct, until being rediscovered in the same area in 2004 (as described in 2009). Its biology is essentially unknown. The Nelson's Small-Eared Shrew is considered to be one of the world's 100 most threatened species on the planet. Once thought extinct, they have been recently rediscovered in very small numbers. They live in high altitudes on the side of an inactive volcano. The shrews are tiny (only 10 centimetres long) with brown fur.
