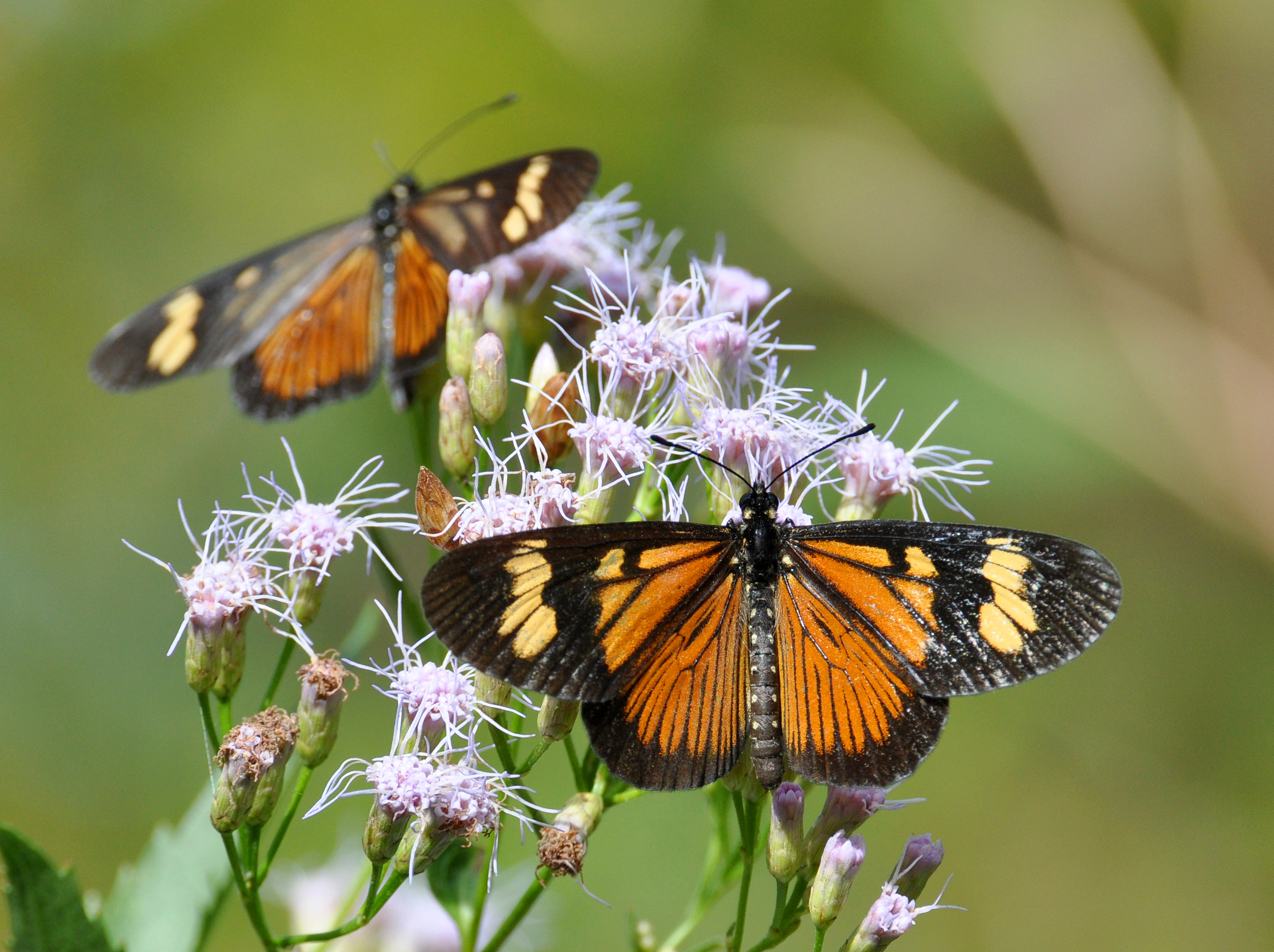
- Actinote pellenea

Scientific classification
- Domain: Eukaryota
- Kingdom: Animalia
- Phylum: Arthropoda
- Class: Insecta
- Order: Lepidoptera
- Family: Nymphalidae
- Tribe: Acraeini
- Genus: Actinote; Hübner, 1819

Species
- See text

Synonyms
- Calornis Billberg, 1820

= Actinote =

Genus of brush-footed butterflies

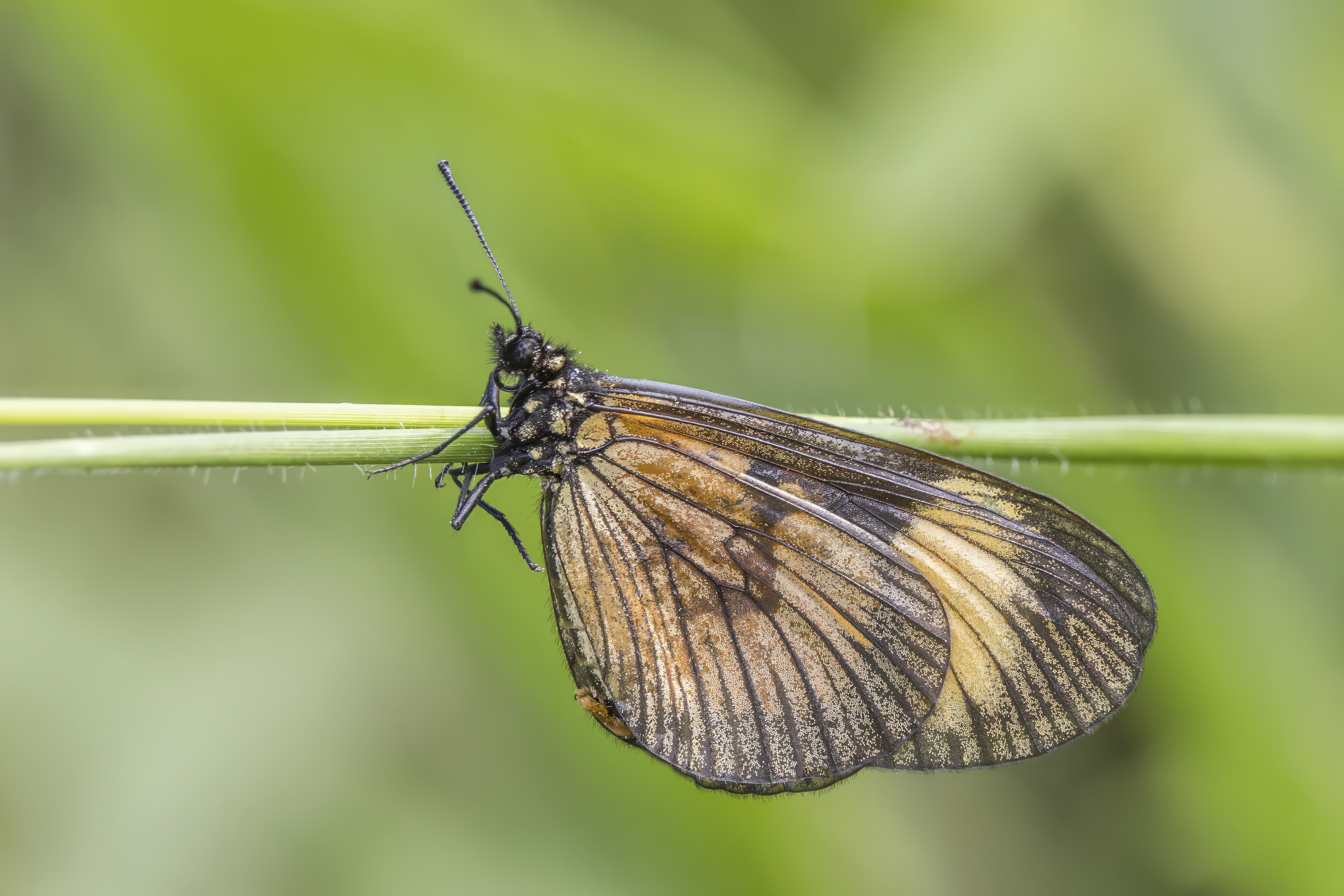
Doubleday's actinote A. anteas, Colombia

Actinote is a genus of butterflies from South America of the subfamily Heliconiinae in the family Nymphalidae. (For taxonomic problems regarding this group, see Acraea.) Males interact with or without physical contact to contest the possession of mating sites. The winner in such interactions often has larger body size and is the individual that previously occupied the territory (the resident).

== Species ==
Listed alphabetically within groups:

- anacreon species group:
  - Actinote anacreon
  - Actinote calida
  - Actinote guichardi
  - Actinote issoria
  - Actinote kaduna
  - Actinote mirifica
  - Actinote rahira
  - Actinote wigginsi
  - Actinote zitja
- mamita species group:
  - Actinote bonita Penz, 1996
  - Actinote brylla Oberthür, 1917
  - Actinote canutia (Hopffer, 1874)
  - Actinote catarina Penz, 1996
  - Actinote conspicua Jordan, 1913
  - Actinote dalmeidai Francini, 1996
  - Actinote discrepans d'Almeida, 1958
  - Actinote eberti Francini, Freitas & Penz, 2004
  - Actinote furtadoi Paluch, Casagrande & Mielke, 2006
  - Actinote genitrix (d'Almeida, 1922)
  - Actinote kennethi Willmott & Hall, 2009
  - Actinote latior Jordan, 1913
  - Actinote mamita (Burmeister, 1861)
  - Actinote melanisans Oberthür, 1917
  - Actinote mielkei Paluch & Casagrande, 2006
  - Actinote mirnae Paluch & Mielke, 2006
  - Actinote morio Oberthür, 1917
  - Actinote pratensis Francini, Freitas & Penz, 2004
  - Actinote rhodope d'Almeida, 1923
  - Actinote rufina Oberthür, 1917
  - Actinote zikani d'Almeida, 1951
- thallia species group:
  - Actinote alalia (C. & R. Felder, 1860)
  - Actinote anteas (Doubleday, 1847) – Doubleday's actinote
  - Actinote carycina Jordan, 1913
  - Actinote guatemalena (Bates, 1864) – Guatemalan actinote
  - Actinote lapitha (Staudinger, 1885) – pale actinote
  - Actinote melampeplos Godman & Salvin, 1881 – bow-winged actinote
  - Actinote pallescens Jordan, 1913
  - Actinote parapheles Jordan, 1913
  - Actinote pellenea Hübner, [1821]
  - Actinote pyrrha (Fabricius, 1775)
  - Actinote quadra (Schaus, 1902)
  - Actinote surima (Schaus, 1902)
  - Actinote thalia (Linnaeus, 1758)
