= Macroderma (fungus) =

Scientific classification
- Kingdom: Fungi
- Division: Ascomycota
- Class: Leotiomycetes
- Order: Rhytismatales
- Family: Cryptomycetaceae
- Genus: Macroderma; Höhn.

Type species
- Macroderma curtisii (Berk. & Ravenel) Höhn.

Genus of fungi

Macroderma is a genus of fungi within the family Cryptomycetaceae.
