= Boracéia Biological Station =

Field research center of the University of São Paulo

- Established: 1954
- Research type: Research; Education
- Field of research: Biology; Environmental science
- Director: Ana Maria Vasques
- Location: Salesópolis, state of São Paulo, Brazil; 23°38′00″S 45°52′00″W
- Operating agency: Museum of Zoology of the University of São Paulo
- Website: Boracéia Biological Station

The Boracéia Biological Station (Portuguese: Estação Biológica de Boracéia) is field research center of the Museum of Zoology of the University of São Paulo in Salesópolis in the state of São Paulo. Its mission is to carry out biological research in zoology and botany on the Atlantic Forest (Mata Atlântica) of the São Paulo region. The biological station covers 96 hectares (240 acres) within the municipality of Salesópolis and is located 110 kilometres (68 mi) from the city of São Paulo.

The Boracéia Biological Station was established on March 16, 1954 under Decree-Law 23 198 of 1954. The center traces its history to 1938 with the establishment of the Quina Experimental Station of the Agronomical Institute of Campinas. The station studied the cultivation of quina, a medicinal plant known as sources for quinine. Quina was grown at the institute until 1952.

The biological station is located within a larger protective water reserve maintained by Sabesp, a water and waste management owned by the State of São Paulo. The water reserve serves as a source of the River Claro aqueduct, and includes 16,450 hectares (40,600 acres) of Atlantic Forest. The Boracéia Biological Station, as a unit of the University of São Paulo, is under neither the control of Sabesp nor the Brazilian National System of Units of Conservation (SNUC).
