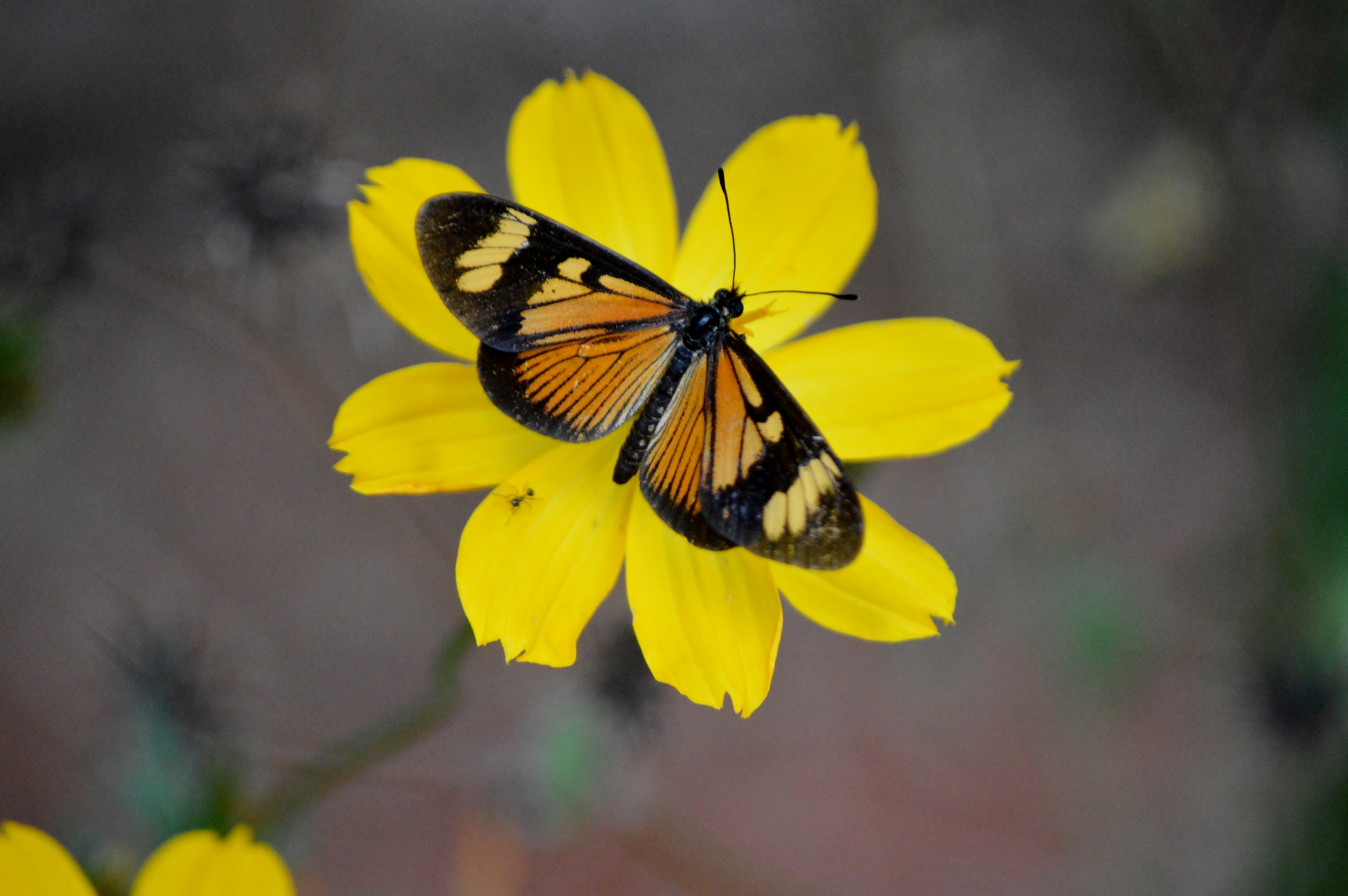
- A. p. giffordi
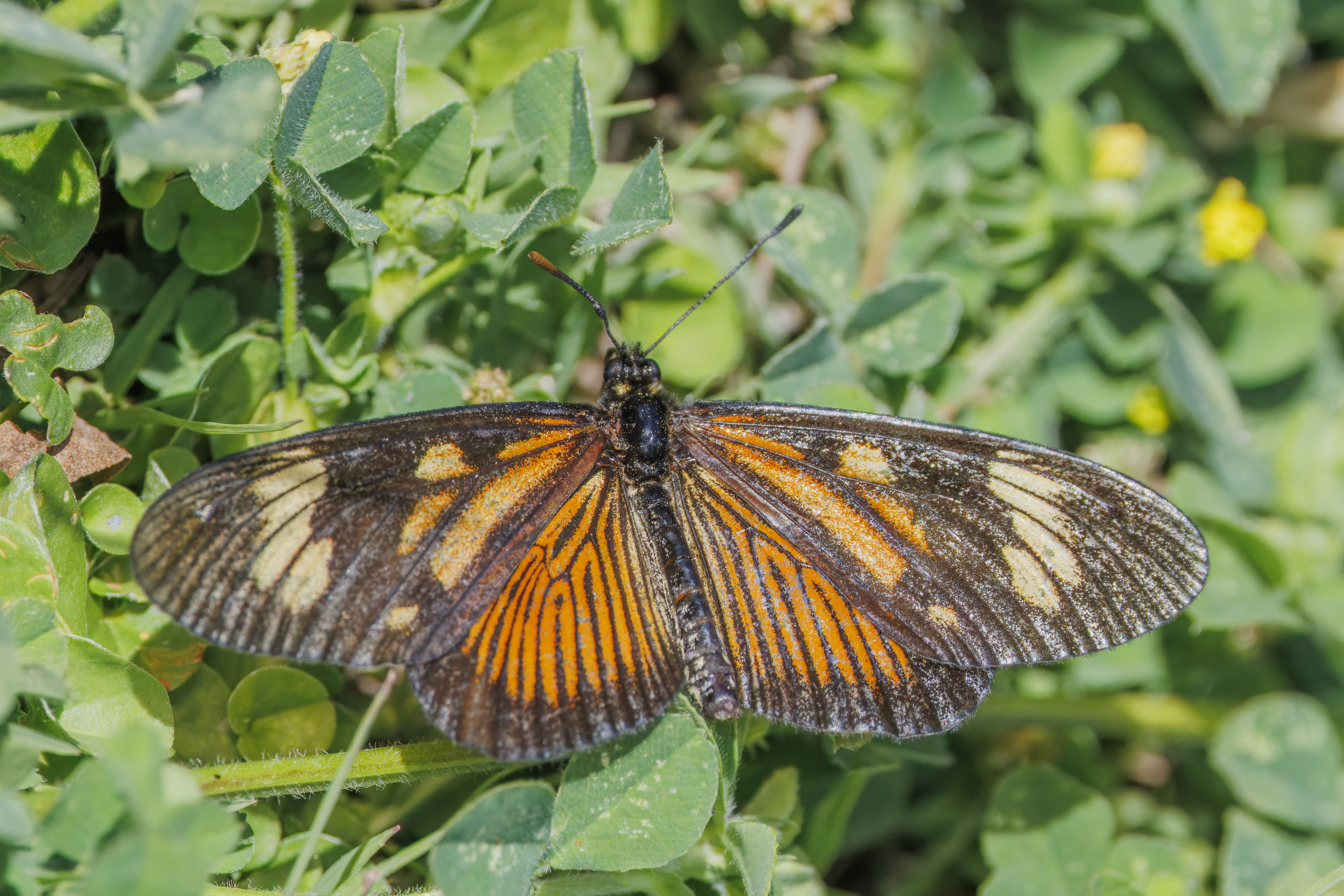
- A. p. calymna

Scientific classification
- Kingdom: Animalia
- Phylum: Arthropoda
- Clade: Pancrustacea
- Class: Insecta
- Order: Lepidoptera
- Family: Nymphalidae
- Genus: Actinote
- Species: A. pellenea

Binomial name
- Actinote pellenea Hübner, 1820-1824

= Actinote pellenea =

Species of butterfly

Actinote pellenea is a species of butterfly of the genus Actinote. Fully-grown adults have a maximum wingspan of ~50-58 millimeters.
