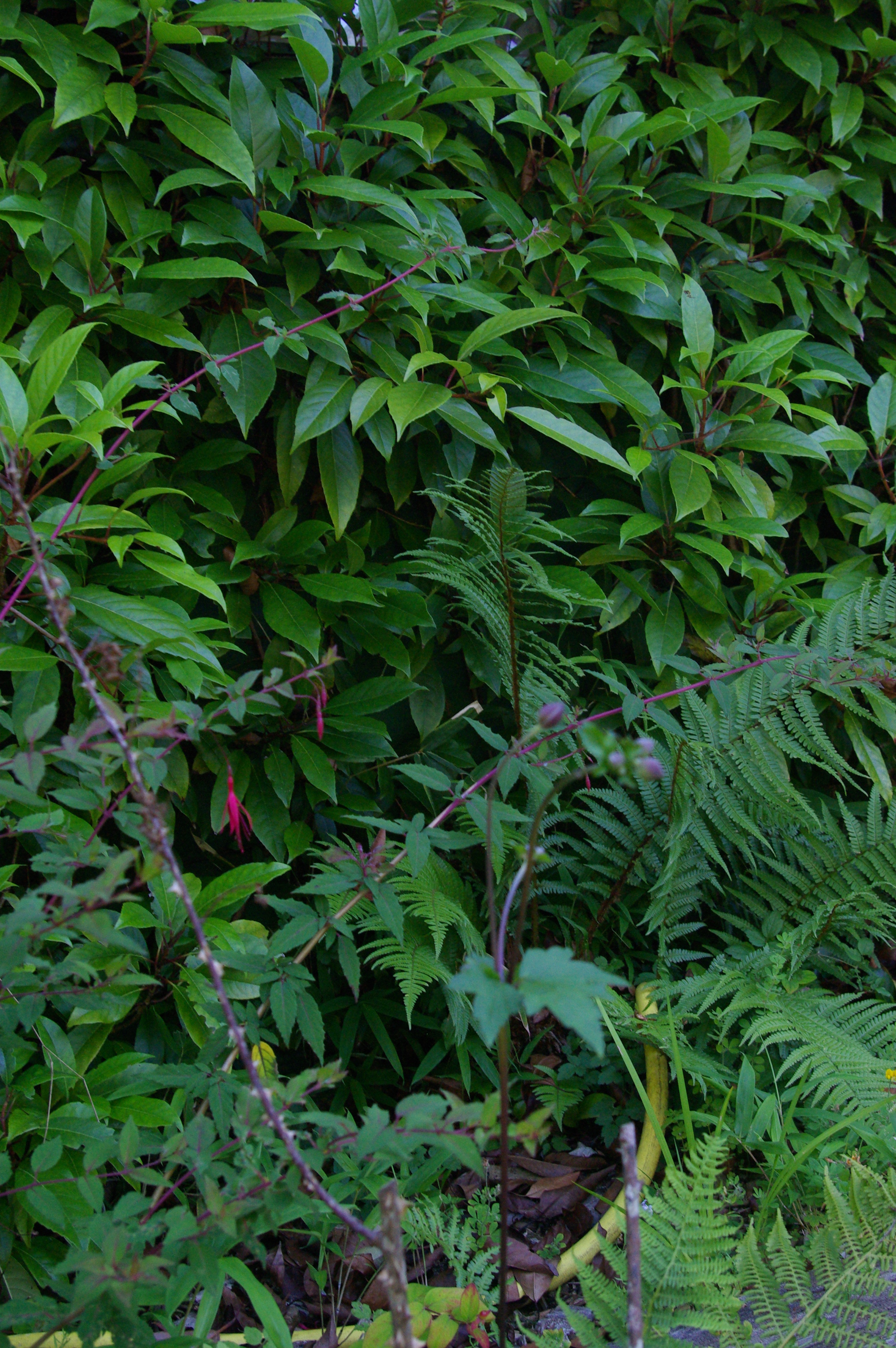

Conservation status
- Critically Endangered (IUCN 3.1)

Scientific classification
- Kingdom: Plantae
- Clade: Embryophytes
- Clade: Tracheophytes
- Clade: Spermatophytes
- Clade: Angiosperms
- Clade: Eudicots
- Clade: Rosids
- Order: Rosales
- Family: Rosaceae
- Genus: Rosa
- Species: R. arabica

Binomial name
- Rosa arabica (Crép. ex Boiss.) Déségl.

= Rosa arabica =

Species of flowering plant

Rosa arabica is a species of rose in the plant family of the Rosaceae, endemic to the Mount Catherine region in the south of the Sinai in Egypt and Jordan. The species is considered critically endangered.

== Physical characteristics and reproduction ==
Rosa arabica has light pink to deep rose flowers that range in size between 3.5 and 4.5 cm (1.4 and 1.8 in). The leaves are pinnate compound with between 5 and 7 leaflets that are broadly elliptic to elliptic obovate in shape. This shrub grows to a height ranging from half a meter to a meter and a half, with shoots that are typically curved. Rosa arabica flowers in late summer.

== Classification ==
There has been much discussion in recent years regarding the classification of R. arabica and whether it is in fact its own species or part of an already identified and existing species. More specifically, there have been questions about where its placement lies within a phylogenetic tree. The use of molecular distance comparisons (with molecular markers) combined with taxonomy, based on morphology, has allowed researchers to identify R. arabica as being its own species that is closely related to Rosa rubiginosa as well as Rosa canina, which all fall under the section of caninae within the family Rosaceae.

== Habitat and distribution ==
Rosa arabica can be found in a national park named Saint Katherine Protectorate located within Mount Catherine within the South Sinai region of Egypt. It is very specific in the environment it prefers to grow in, favoring very rocky terrain provided by the mountains in Saint Katherine Protectorate. Its preferred altitudinal range is between 1700 and 2350 meters above sea level. This preference has resulted in an increased risk for isolation due to a couple of factors. One factor is that at these heights, the surrounding groups of mountains limits seed dispersal for R. arabica. The second factor increasing isolation and limiting population growth is that the plant itself produces very small numbers of seeds. The area that can actually support the growth of the R. arabica is very small, with an extent of occurrence of about 40 km^{2} (15 sq mi) and an area of occupancy of 36 km^{2} (14 sq mi).

== Uses ==
Rosa arabica has multiple uses that include medicinal, fuel, scientific research, and as a pastoral plant for livestock. As a result, there is monetary gain associated with the multiple parts of the R. arabica which includes: the flower, leaves, and extracts. The plant has been applied in human health care to aid with menstrual pain as well as shown utility in animal health care to aid with reproductive troubles within sheep, goats, camels, and equines. Rosa arabica has also been picked and collected in order to study it in scientific research.

== Critically endangered status and conservation ==
There are a multitude of factors that are driving the R. arabica towards extinction and led it to be listed as critically endangered by the IUCN but, generally, the primary causes fall into two categories: human intervention and natural causes. Rosa arabica have been over-collected due to its medicinal and scientific significance. Climate change contributes to R. arabica critically endangered status which has, in turn, lowered the precipitation available for it to grow and survive. Floods and droughts within their habitat have also been attributed to climate change. Water is being moved from higher to lower elevations by humans, which has also impacted the habitat of the R. arabica. A natural cause affecting R. arabica are feral donkeys and their tendency to frequent the areas where R. arabica like to grow, treading over and crushing them in the process, which further decreases their numbers. An estimate on the number of mature R. arabica individuals sits at about 90, which encompasses all 13 known subpopulations, as of a survey conducted in 2015 which predicts a population decline as time goes on. Many conservation ideas have been proposed, but one that has been realized was implemented by Saint Katherine Protectorate rangers in which they enclosed a couple of subpopulations of R. arabica and kept them fenced while observing fluctuations in their numbers every 2 years. The Medicinal Plants Conservation Project has also tried to improve the outlook of R. arabica through active attempts of growing the R. arabica outside of its natural habitat, within greenhouses, as well as preserving its seeds.
