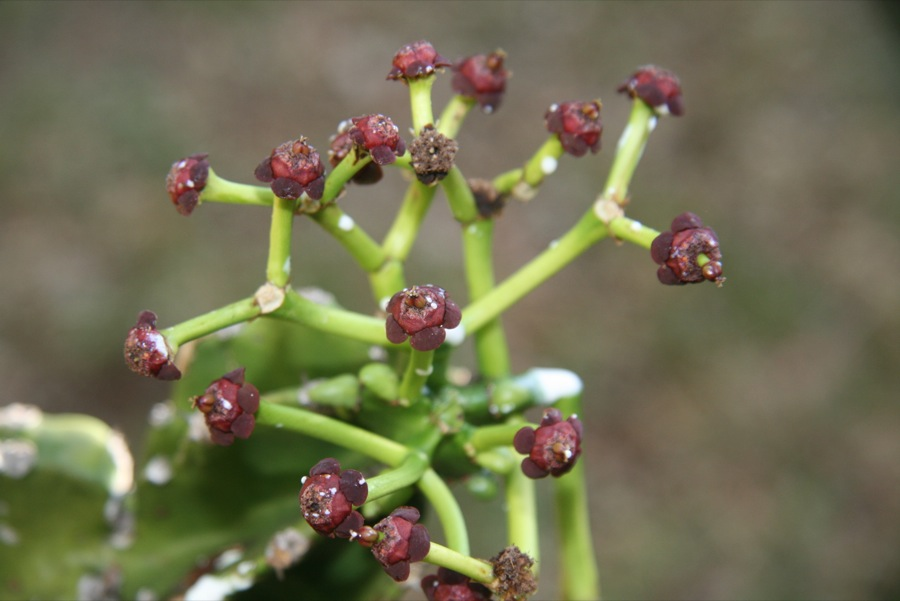

Conservation status
- Critically Endangered (IUCN 3.1)

Scientific classification
- Kingdom: Plantae
- Clade: Tracheophytes
- Clade: Angiosperms
- Clade: Eudicots
- Clade: Rosids
- Order: Malpighiales
- Family: Euphorbiaceae
- Genus: Euphorbia
- Species: E. tanaensis

Binomial name
- Euphorbia tanaensis P.R.O.Bally & S.Carter

= Euphorbia tanaensis =

Species of flowering plant

Euphorbia tanaensis is a critically endangered flowering plant within the family Euphorbiaceae. This species is endemic to a specific location along the Tana River in Kenya. A follow-up survey conducted in 2006 found only four remaining individuals, with no evidence of natural regeneration.

== Description ==
Euphorbia tanaensis is a medium-sized succulent.

== Distribution and habitat ==
Euphorbia tanaensis is endemic to Witu, Kenya.

== Conservation ==
Euphorbia tanaensis is listed as Critically Endangered by the International Union for Conservation of Nature (IUCN).

Efforts of conservation include several nursery-raised seedlings being planted in Witu and Kilifi's Arabuko Sokoke forests.
