= Valencia letourneuxi =

Conservation status
- Critically Endangered (IUCN 3.1)

Scientific classification
- Kingdom: Animalia
- Phylum: Chordata
- Class: Actinopterygii
- Division: Teleostei
- Order: Cyprinodontiformes
- Family: Valenciidae
- Genus: Valencia
- Species: V. letourneuxi

Binomial name
- Valencia letourneuxi (Sauvage, 1880)
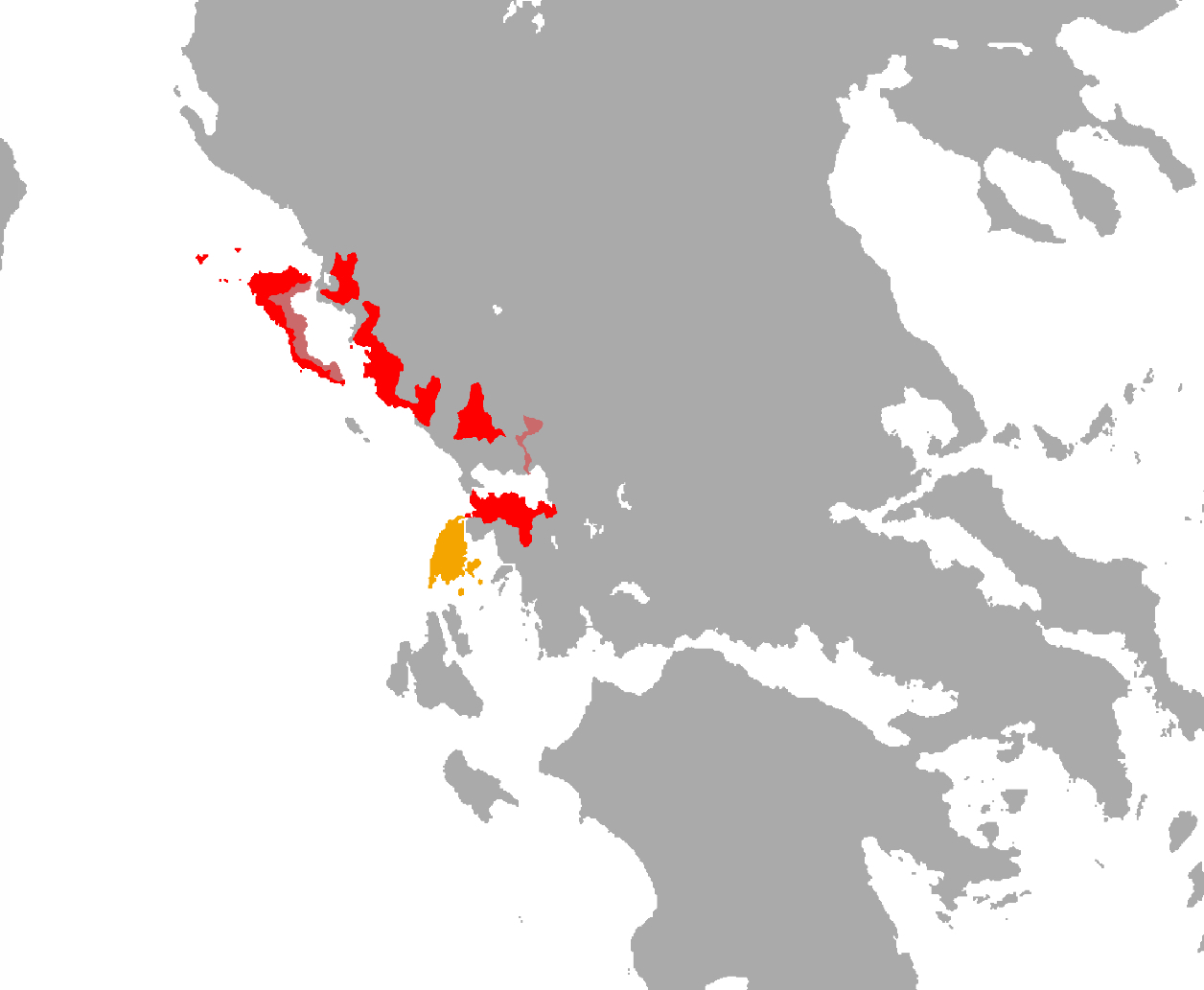
- Red: extant Light red: possibly extant Yellow: extinct

Synonyms
- Fundulus letourneuxi Sauvage, 1880

Species of fish

Valencia letourneuxi, the Corfu toothcarp, is a species of fish in the family Valenciidae. It is found in Albania and Greece. Its natural habitats are rivers, freshwater marshes, freshwater spring, and coastal saline lagoons. It is threatened by habitat loss. The specific name of this fish honours the collector of the type, the botanist Aristide-Horace Letourneux (1820-1890). The species was described as Fundulus letourneuxi in 1880 by Henri Émile Sauvage with a type locality of Cressida, Corfu. It also formerly occurred on the island of Lefkas but is now considered to be extirpated from both there and Corfu. Valencia letourneuxi is a highly endangered freshwater species that faces threats from habitat degradation, water abstraction, and foreign species. While little is known of its ecological history, V. Letourneuxi produce 2.2 mm eggs during the spring on aquatic plants in stagnant water that has a lot of vegetation.
