= Killi =

Killi may refer to:

== Place names ==
- Killi, a village in northern Syria
- Killi, a village in Punjab, India
- Killi river, also called Killiyar, the main tributary of Karamana River, in Kerala, India

== People ==
- Anita Killi (born 1968), Norwegian animator and film director
- Johanne Killi (born 1997), Norwegian freestyle skier
- Kjell Erik Killi Olsen (born 1952), Norwegian painter and sculptor
- Steinar Killi (born 1941), Norwegian civil servant
- Killi Krupa Rani (born 1965), Indian politician
- Rajendran Rajamahendran (1943–2021), Sri Lankan businessman, media personality, philanthropist and social activist, nicknamed as "Kili Maharaja" aka "Kili Rajamahendran" (sometimes spelled as "Killi Rajamahendran")

== Fish species ==
- Killifish (or Killi fish), a fish common name of some fish in the order Cyprinodontiformes
  - Clown killi (Epiplatys annulatus)
  - Blue lyretail (Gardner's Killi)
  - Kribi killi (Fundulopanchax kribianus)
  - Aphyosemion bivittatum (Two-banded Killi)

== Other ==
- Mundari language, also known as Killi language, in India

== See also ==
- Chola dynasty, also known in Tamil as the "Killi dynasty" and realm, in southern India
- Church builders Killi and Nalli
- K'illi K'illi (or Killi Killi)
- Killis
- Ibn Killis
- Kili (disambiguation)
