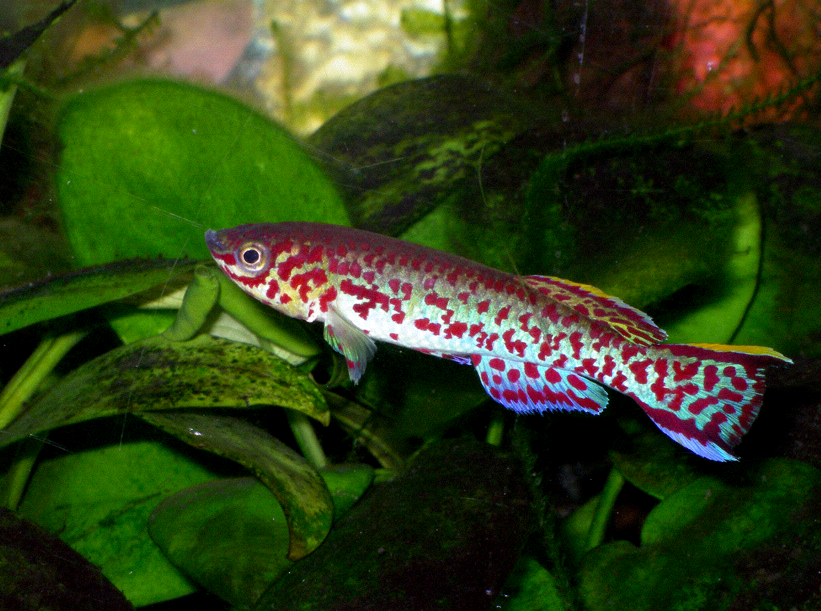
- Blue lyretail (F. gardneri), adult male
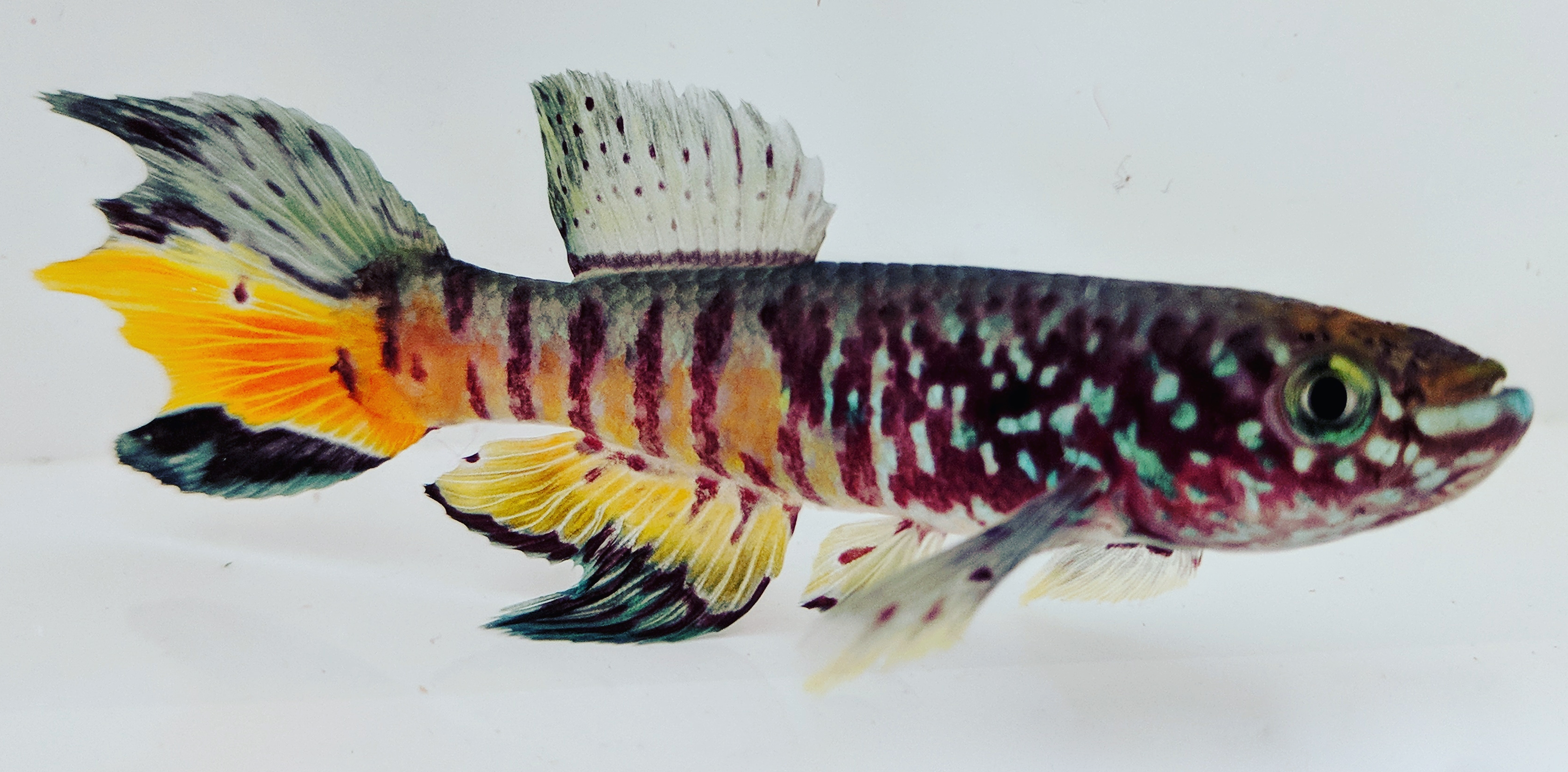
- Fundulopanchax sjostedti 'Niger Delta', adult male

Scientific classification
- Kingdom: Animalia
- Phylum: Chordata
- Class: Actinopterygii
- Order: Cyprinodontiformes
- Family: Nothobranchiidae
- Genus: Fundulopanchax; G. S. Myers, 1924

Type species
- Fundulus gularis var. caerulea Boulenger, 1915

Species
- See text.

= Fundulopanchax =

Genus of fishes

Fundulopanchax is a genus of killifish living in near-coastal fresh water streams and lakes in Western Africa. All species were previously biologically classified as members of the genus Aphyosemion, with the exception of Fundulopanchax avichang, F. gresensi and F. kamdemi, which were all scientifically described after the major revision of the Aphyosemion complex.

== Etymology ==
The name Fundulopanchax is composed of the names of two other genera of killifish, Fundulus Lacépède (1803), which was the genus the type species was originally placed in and Panchax Valenciennes (1846), as this genus is somewhat intermediate between Fundulus and Aplocheilus in characters.

== Species ==
There are currently 26 recognized species in this genus:

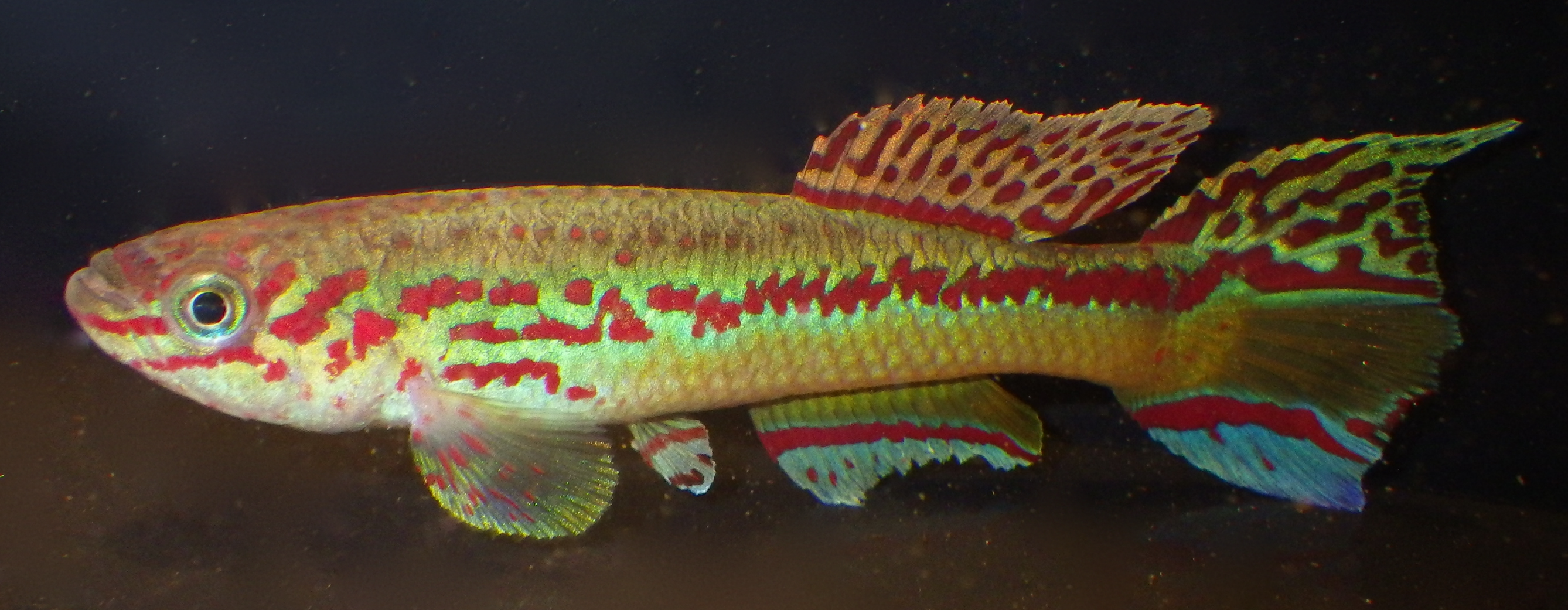
Fundulopanchax amieti Edea Male

- Fundulopanchax amieti (Radda, 1976) (Amiet's lyretail)
- Fundulopanchax arnoldi (Boulenger, 1908) (Arnold's killi)
- Fundulopanchax avichang Malumbres & Castelo, 2001
- Fundulopanchax cinnamomeus (Clausen, 1963) (cinnamon killi)
- Fundulopanchax deltaensis (Radda, 1976) (Delta killi)
- Fundulopanchax fallax (C. G. E. Ahl, 1935) (Kribi killi)
- Fundulopanchax filamentosus Meinken, 1933 (plumed lyretail)
- Fundulopanchax gardneri (Boulenger, 1911)
  - Fundulopanchax gardneri gardneri (Boulenger, 1911) (blue lyretail)
  - Fundulopanchax gardneri lacustris (Langton, 1974) (Ejagham killi)
  - Fundulopanchax gardneri mamfensis (Radda, 1974) (Mamfe killi)
  - Fundulopanchax gardneri nigerianus (Clausen, 1963) (Nigerian killi)
- Fundulopanchax gresensi Berkenkamp, 2003
- Fundulopanchax gularis (Boulenger, 1902) (gulare)
- Fundulopanchax intermittens (Radda, 1974)
- Fundulopanchax kamdemi Akum, Sonnenberg, Van der Zee & Wildekamp, 2007
- Fundulopanchax marmoratus (Radda, 1973) (marbled lyretail)
- Fundulopanchax mirabilis (Radda, 1970)
- Fundulopanchax moensis (Radda, 1970)
- Fundulopanchax ndianus (Scheel, 1968)
- Fundulopanchax oeseri (H. Schmidt, 1928)
- Fundulopanchax powelli Van der Zee & Wildekamp, 1994
- Fundulopanchax puerzli (Radda & Scheel, 1974)
- Fundulopanchax robertsoni (Radda & Scheel, 1974)
- Fundulopanchax rubrolabialis (Radda, 1973)
- Fundulopanchax scheeli (Radda, 1970)
- Fundulopanchax sjostedti (Lönnberg, 1895) (blue gularis)
- Fundulopanchax spoorenbergi (Berkenkamp, 1976)
- Fundulopanchax traudeae (Radda, 1971)
- Fundulopanchax walkeri (Boulenger, 1911)
