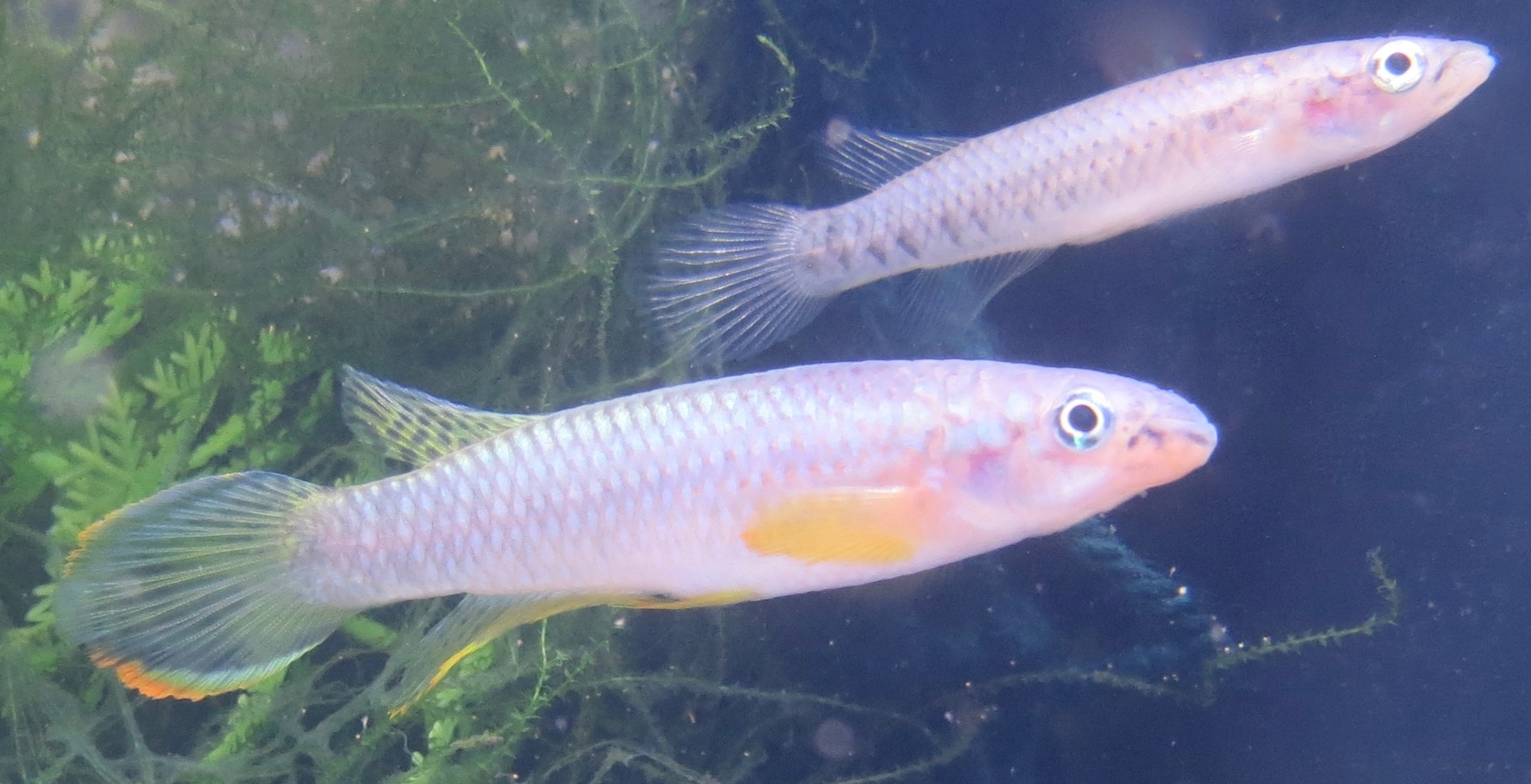

Scientific classification
- Kingdom: Animalia
- Phylum: Chordata
- Class: Actinopterygii
- Order: Cyprinodontiformes
- Family: Nothobranchiidae
- Genus: Epiplatys; T. N. Gill, 1862

Type species
- Epiplatys sexfasciatus T. N. Gill, 1862

Synonyms
- Aphyoplatys Clausen, 1967; Lycocyprinus W. K. H. Peters, 1868; Parepiplatys Clausen, 1967; Pseudepiplatys Clausen, 1967

= Epiplatys =

Genus of fishes

Epiplatys is a genus of African rivuline in the family Nothobranchiidae endemic to Africa as the name indicates. Several of these species are popular aquarium fish.

== Species ==
These are the currently recognized species in this genus:

- Epiplatys annulatus (Boulenger, 1915) (Banded panchax)
- Epiplatys ansorgii (Boulenger, 1911)
- Epiplatys atratus Van der Zee, Mbimbe & Sonnenberg, 2013
- Epiplatys barmoiensis Scheel, 1968
- Epiplatys biafranus Radda, 1970
- Epiplatys bifasciatus (Steindachner, 1881)
- Epiplatys cashneri
- Epiplatys chaperi (Sauvage, 1882) (Toothed carp)
- Epiplatys chevalieri (Pellegrin, 1904)
- Epiplatys coccinatus Berkenkamp & Etzel, 1982
- Epiplatys dageti Poll, 1953
  - Epiplatys dageti dageti Poll, 1953 (Redchin panchax)
  - Epiplatys dageti monroviae Arnoult & Daget, 1965
- Epiplatys duboisi Poll, 1952 (Dubois' panchax)
- Epiplatys esekanus Scheel, 1968
- Epiplatys etzeli Berkenkamp, 1975
- Epiplatys fasciolatus (Günther, 1866)
- Epiplatys grahami (Boulenger, 1911)
- Epiplatys guineensis Romand, 1994
- Epiplatys hildegardae Berkenkamp, 1978
- Epiplatys huberi (Radda & Pürzl, 1981)
- Epiplatys infrafasciatus (Günther, 1866)
- Epiplatys josianae Berkenkamp & Etzel, 1983
- Epiplatys lamottei Daget, 1954 (Redspotted panchax)
- Epiplatys longiventralis (Boulenger, 1911)
- Epiplatys maeseni (Poll, 1941)
- Epiplatys mesogramma Huber, 1980
- Epiplatys multifasciatus (Boulenger, 1913)
- Epiplatys neumanni Berkenkamp, 1993
- Epiplatys njalaensis W. Neumann, 1976
- Epiplatys olbrechtsi Poll, 1941
- Epiplatys phoeniceps Huber, 1980
- Epiplatys roloffi Romand, 1978
- Epiplatys ruhkopfi Berkenkamp & Etzel, 1980
- Epiplatys sangmelinensis (C. G. E. Ahl, 1928)
- Epiplatys sexfasciatus T. N. Gill, 1862
  - Epiplatys sexfasciatus rathkei Radda, 1970
  - Epiplatys sexfasciatus sexfasciatus T. N. Gill, 1862 (Sixbar panchax)
  - Epiplatys sexfasciatus togolensis Loiselle, 1971
- Epiplatys singa (Boulenger, 1899)
- Epiplatys spilargyreius (A. H. A. Duméril, 1861)
- Epiplatys zenkeri (C. G. E. Ahl, 1928)
