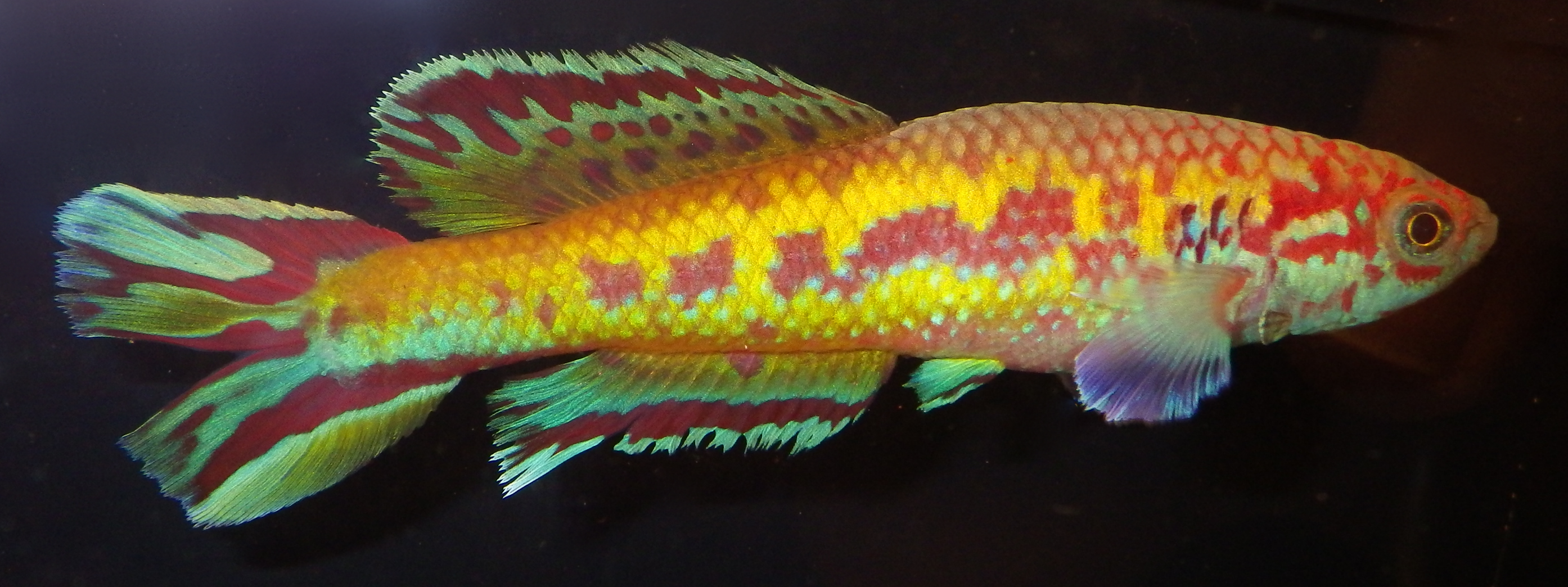
- male Callopanchax occidentalis

Scientific classification
- Domain: Eukaryota
- Kingdom: Animalia
- Phylum: Chordata
- Class: Actinopterygii
- Order: Cyprinodontiformes
- Family: Nothobranchiidae
- Genus: Callopanchax; G. S. Myers, 1933

Type species
- Aphyosemion occidentale Clausen, 1966

= Callopanchax =

Genus of fishes

Callopanchax is a genus of African rivulines endemic, as the name indicates, to Africa. Some of these species are popular aquarium fish.

== Species ==
There are currently four recognized species in this genus:

- Callopanchax monroviae (Roloff & Ladiges, 1972)
- Callopanchax occidentalis (Clausen, 1966) (Golden pheasant panchax)
- Callopanchax sidibeorum Sonnenberg & Busch, 2010
- Callopanchax toddi (Clausen, 1966)
