= Aphyosemion calliurum =

Conservation status
- Least Concern (IUCN 3.1)

Scientific classification
- Kingdom: Animalia
- Phylum: Chordata
- Class: Actinopterygii
- Order: Cyprinodontiformes
- Family: Nothobranchiidae
- Genus: Aphyosemion
- Species: A. calliurum

Binomial name
- Aphyosemion calliurum (Boulenger, 1911)

Species of fish

Aphyosemion calliurum (commonly called the banner lyretail) is a species of freshwater killifish in the family Nothobranchiidae. It occurs in coastal rainforest waters of West Africa from southern Benin and southern Nigeria to south-western Cameroon.

== Description ==
Adults are small, to about 5 cm (2.0 in) total length. As in many Aphyosemion, males are more brightly colored and have more elongated fins than females. Populations vary in color pattern, typically showing rows of red spotting on the flanks and colored margins to the median fins; their overall build is stockier than the closely related Aphyosemion australe.

== Distribution and habitat ==
Aphyosemion calliurum inhabits swamps, swampy parts of brooks, small streams, and pools of the coastal rainforest belt. It is benthopelagic, non-migratory, and recorded from waters with pH roughly 5.8–7.2 and temperatures around 24–26 °C (75–79 °F).

== Taxonomy ==
A. calliurum was described by George Albert Boulenger in 1911. It has a complex synonymy in the aquarium and historical literature, later clarified in taxonomic checklists. Molecular and karyological work places it within the calliurum species group together with (among others) A. ahli and A. australe.

== Ecology ==
Like related species, A. calliurum feeds on small aquatic invertebrates. It is not an annual species; eggs and larvae develop continuously in water rather than undergoing diapause.

== Conservation ==
The IUCN Red List assesses A. calliurum as Least Concern. It has a wide extent of occurrence, but localized habitat management and restoration are recommended in parts of its range. The species is harvested for local consumption and appears in the aquarium trade, where it is regarded as easy to maintain.

== In the aquarium ==
This species has been present in the hobby for decades. It spawns among fine-leaved vegetation or spawning mops; at typical tropical temperatures, eggs hatch in roughly two weeks. Captive stocks readily accept small live and prepared foods.
