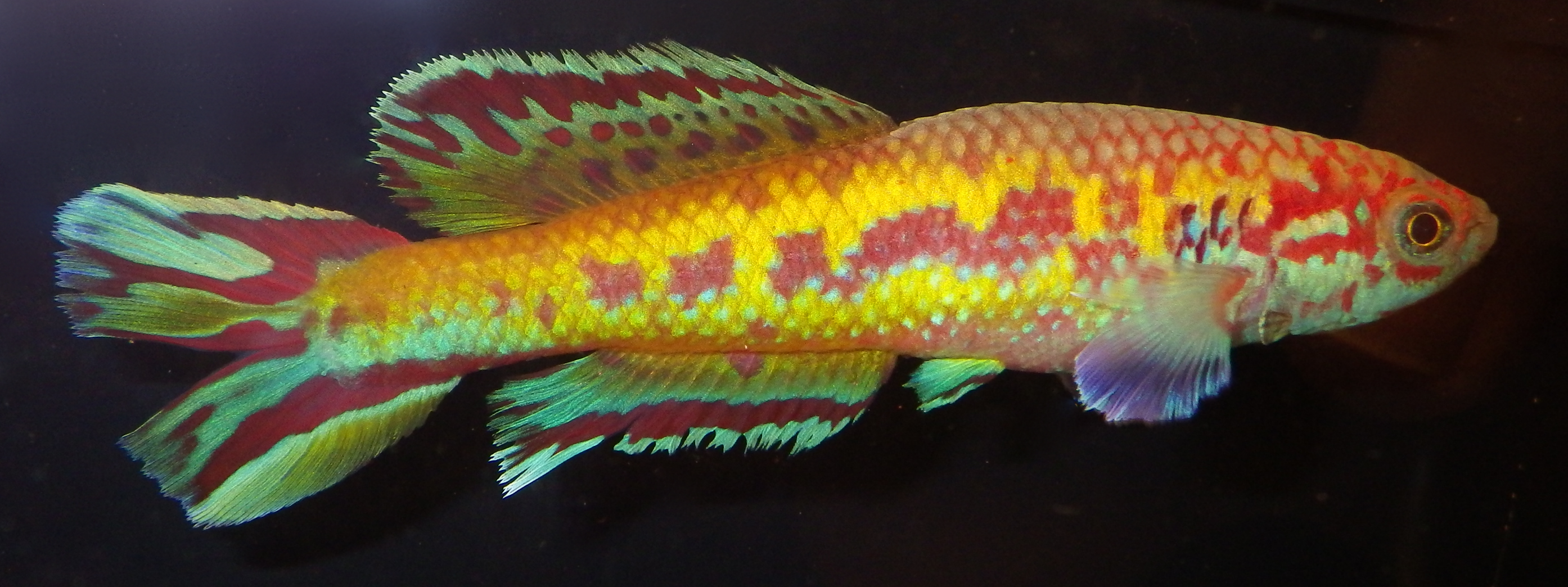

Conservation status
- Least Concern (IUCN 3.1)

Scientific classification
- Kingdom: Animalia
- Phylum: Chordata
- Class: Actinopterygii
- Order: Cyprinodontiformes
- Family: Nothobranchiidae
- Genus: Callopanchax
- Species: C. occidentalis

Binomial name
- Callopanchax occidentalis Clausen, 1966

Synonyms
- Aphyosemion occidentale Clausen, 1966; Fundulopanchax occidentalis (Clausen, 1966); Roloffia occidentalis (Clausen, 1966)

= Callopanchax occidentalis =

Species of fish

Callopanchax occidentalis is a species of killifish in the family Nothobranchiidae. It is endemic to Sierra Leone and western Liberia.

== Ecology ==
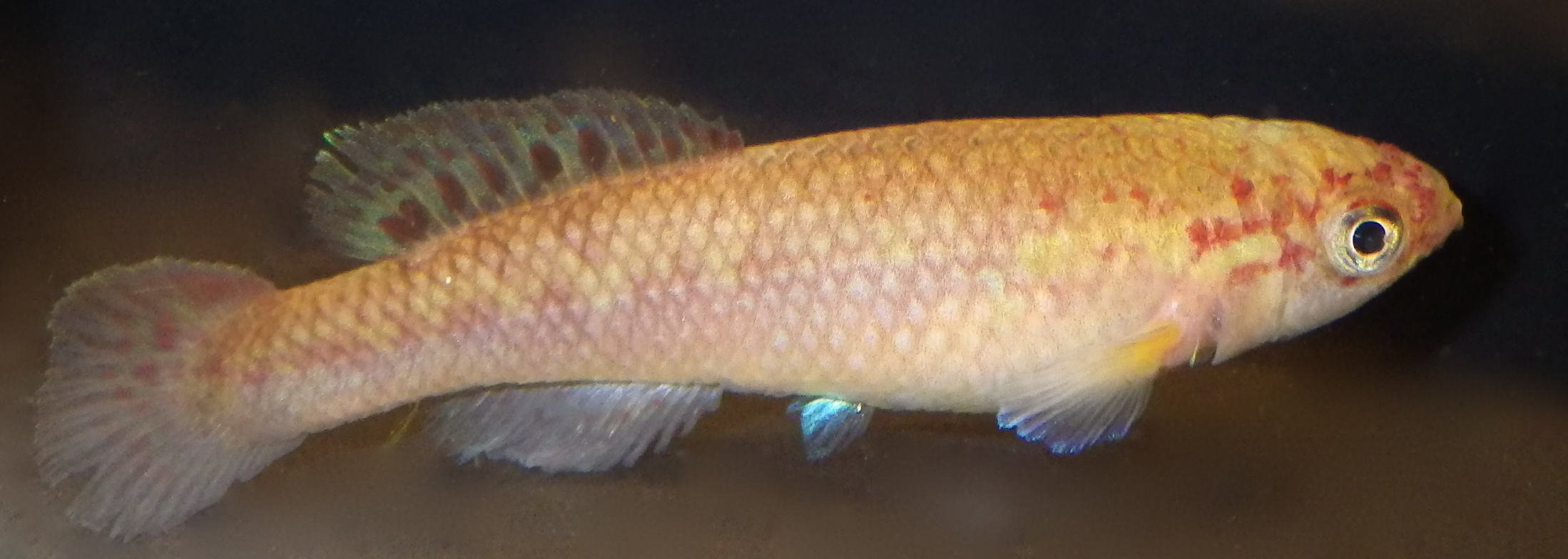
C. occidentalis female

The species is an annual killifish whose eggs survive in the mud during the dry season. It inhabits pools, swampy sections of streams and temporary swamps in rainforest and forested savannah, feeding on small invertebrates.
