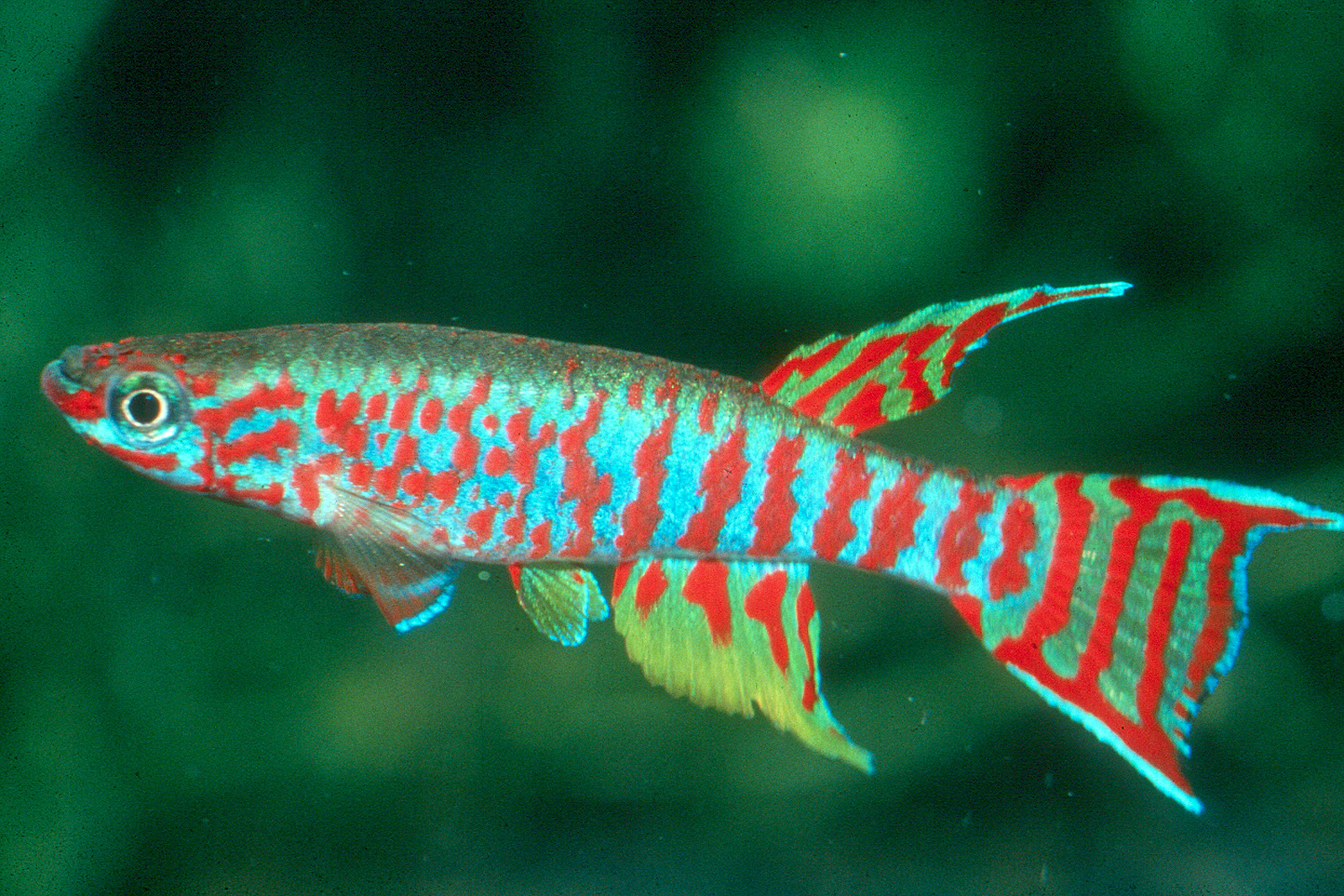
- Aphyosemion elberti, male
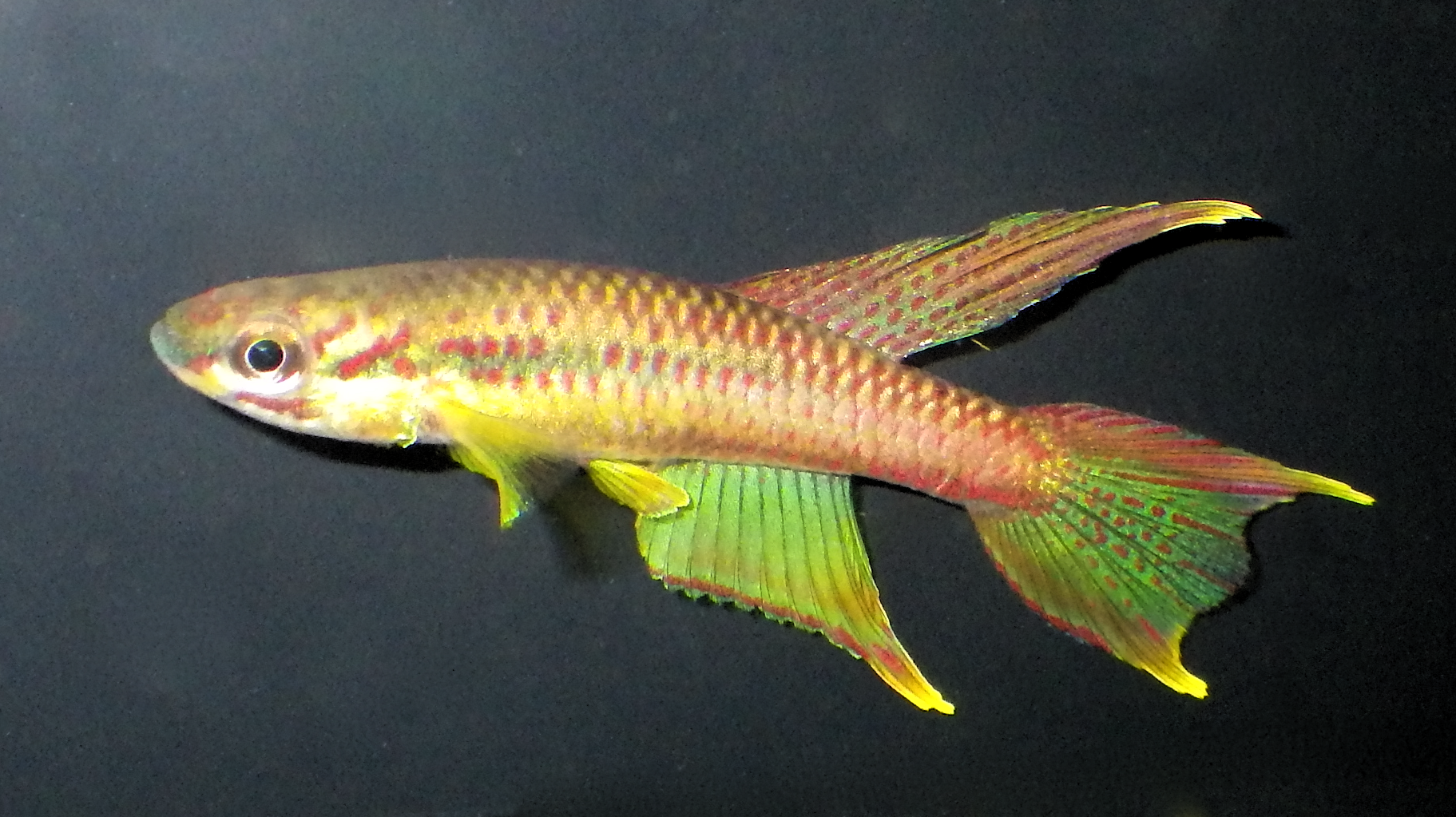
- Aphyosemion splendopleure, male

Scientific classification
- Kingdom: Animalia
- Phylum: Chordata
- Class: Actinopterygii
- Order: Cyprinodontiformes
- Family: Nothobranchiidae
- Genus: Aphyosemion; G. S. Myers, 1924

Type species
- Aphyosemion castaneum G. S. Myers, 1924

Synonyms
- Chromaphyosemion *Radda, 1971: Diapteron Huber & Seegers, 1977; Iconisemion Huber, 2013; Kathetys Huber, 1977; Mesoaphyosemion Radda, 1977; Paraphyosemion Radda, 1977; Scheelsemion Huber, 2013

= Aphyosemion =

Genus of fishes

Aphyosemion is a genus of African rivulines endemic as the name indicates to Africa. Many of these species are popular aquarium fish.

== Species ==
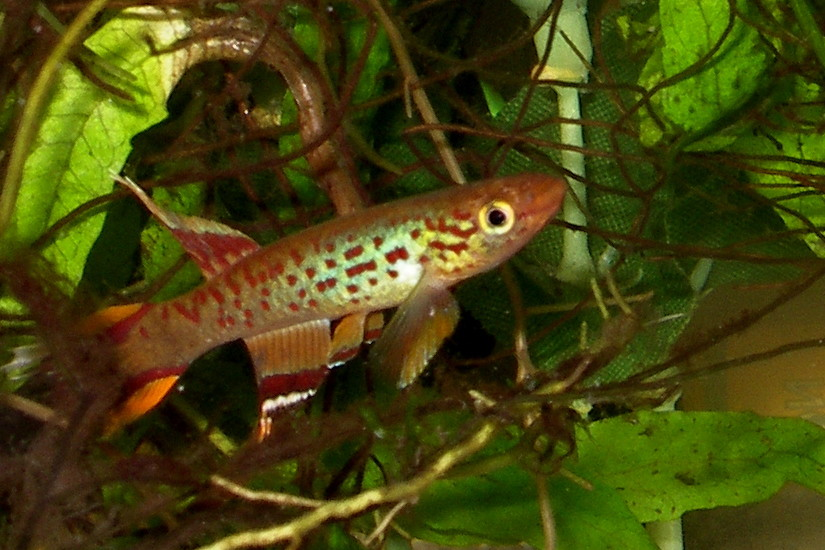
Aphyosemion australe, wild type, male

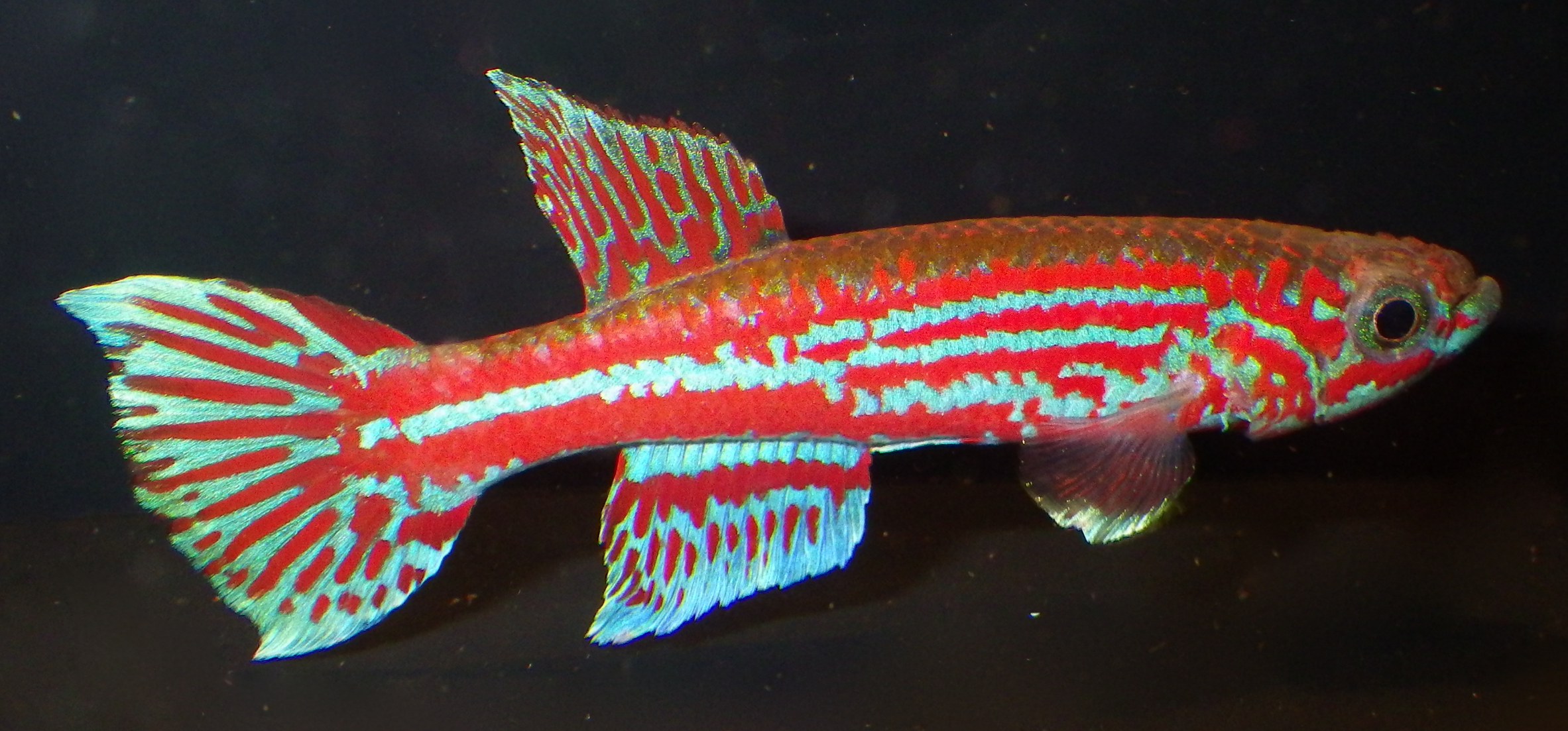
Aphyosemion ogoense, male

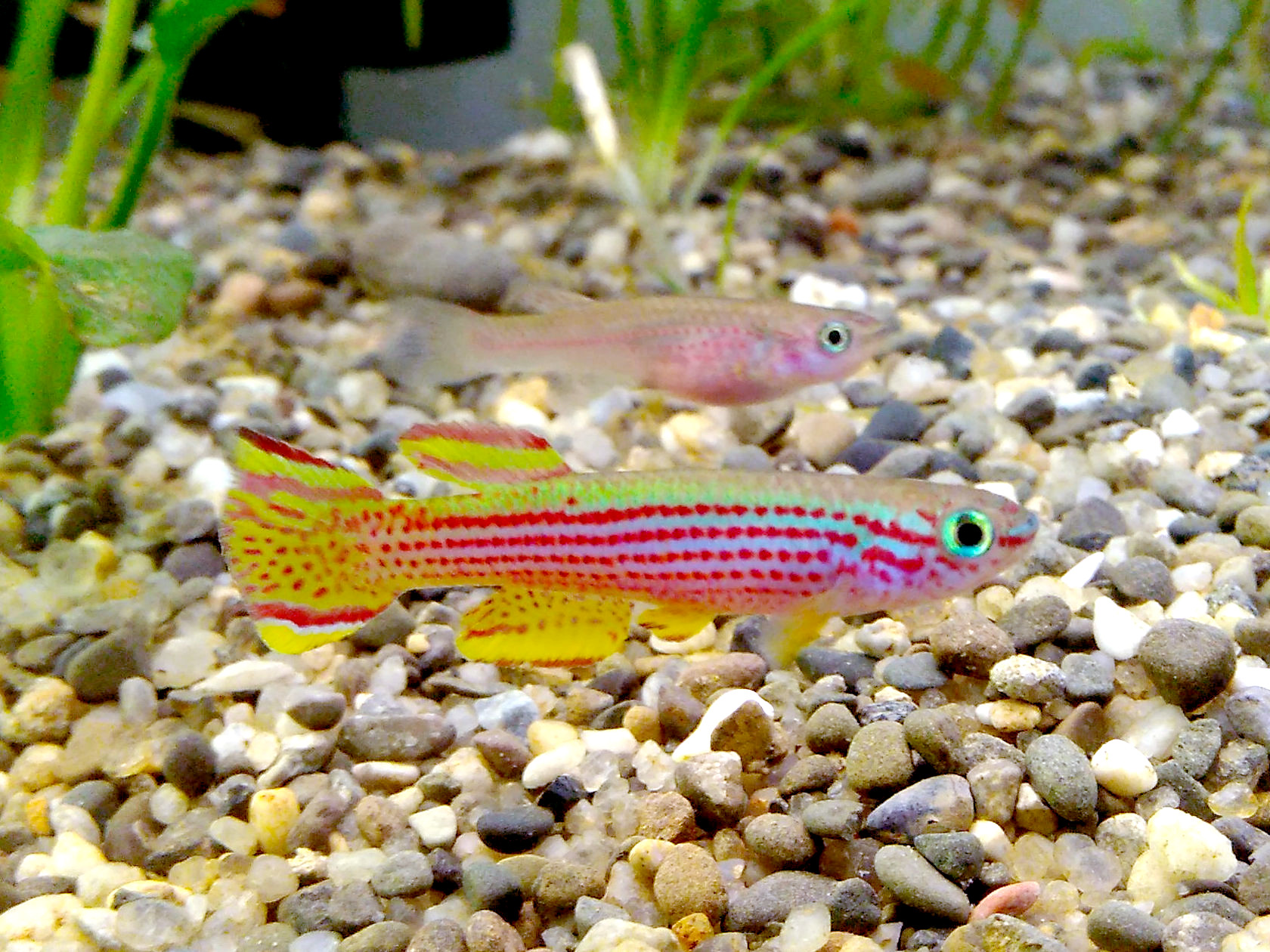
Aphyosemion striatum pair: female in background

There are currently 100 recognized species in this genus:

- Aphyosemion abacinum Huber, 1976
- Aphyosemion ahli G. S. Myers, 1933
- Aphyosemion alpha Huber, 1998
- Aphyosemion amoenum Radda & Pürzl, 1976 (Red-finned killifish)
- Aphyosemion aureum Radda, 1980 (Golden killifish)
- Aphyosemion australe (Rachow, 1921) (Lyre-tail killifish)
- Aphyosemion bamilekorum Radda, 1971 (Bamileke killifish)
- Aphyosemion batesii (Boulenger, 1911) (Bates' killifish)
- Aphyosemion bitaeniatum (C. G. E. Ahl, 1924) (Two-striped killifish)
- Aphyosemion bitteri Valdesalici & Eberl, 2016
- Aphyosemion bivittatum (Lönnberg, 1895) (Two-stripe lyretail)
- Aphyosemion bualanum (C. G. E. Ahl, 1924)
- Aphyosemion buytaerti Radda & Huber, 1978
- Aphyosemion callipteron (Radda & Pürzl, 1987)
- Aphyosemion calliurum (Boulenger, 1911) (Banner lyretail)
- Aphyosemion cameronense (Boulenger, 1903) (Cameroon killifish)
- Aphyosemion campomaanense Agnèse, Brummett, Caminade, Catalan & Kornobis, 2009
- Aphyosemion castaneum G. S. Myers, 1924
- Aphyosemion caudofasciatum Huber & Radda, 1979 (Caudal-stripe killifish)
- Aphyosemion celiae Scheel, 1971
- Aphyosemion chauchei Huber & Scheel, 1981
- Aphyosemion christyi (Boulenger, 1915) (Christy's lyretail)
- Aphyosemion citrineipinnis Huber & Radda, 1977
- Aphyosemion coeleste Huber & Radda, 1977 (Sky-blue killifish)
- Aphyosemion cognatum Meinken, 1951 (Red-spot killifish)
- Aphyosemion congicum (C. G. E. Ahl, 1924) (Congo killifish)
- Aphyosemion cyanostictum J. G. Lambert & Géry, 1968 (Gabon jewel killifish)
- Aphyosemion dargei Amiet, 1987 (M'bam killifish)
- Aphyosemion decorsei (Pellegrin, 1904)
- Aphyosemion ecucuense (Sonnenberg, 2008)
- Aphyosemion edeanum Amiet, 1987 (Edea killifish)
- Aphyosemion elberti (C. G. E. Ahl, 1924) (Red-barred killifish)
- Aphyosemion elegans (Boulenger, 1899) (Elegant killifish)
- Aphyosemion erythron (Sonnenberg, 2008)
- Aphyosemion escherichi (C. G. E. Ahl, 1924) (Escherich's killifish)
- Aphyosemion etsamense Sonnenberg & T. Blum, 2005
- Aphyosemion exigoideum Radda & Huber, 1977 (False jewel killifish)
- Aphyosemion exiguum (Boulenger, 1911) (Jewel killifish)
- Aphyosemion fellmanni van der Zee & Sonnenberg, 2018
- Aphyosemion ferranti (Boulenger, 1910)
- Aphyosemion franzwerneri Scheel, 1971 (Goby killifish)
- Aphyosemion fulgens Radda, 1975
- Aphyosemion gabunense Radda, 1975 (Gabon killifish)
- Aphyosemion georgiae J. G. Lambert & Géry, 1968
- Aphyosemion grelli Valdesalici & Eberl, 2013
- Aphyosemion hanneloreae Radda & Pürzl, 1985 (Hannelore's killifish)
- Aphyosemion heinemanni Berkenkamp, 1983 (Heinemann's killifish)
- Aphyosemion hera Huber, 1998
- Aphyosemion herzogi Radda, 1975 (Herzog's killifish)
- Aphyosemion hofmanni Radda, 1980 (Hofmann's killifish)
- Aphyosemion jeanhuberi Valdesalici & Eberl, 2015
- Aphyosemion joergenscheeli Huber & Radda, 1977
- Aphyosemion kouamense Legros, 1999
- Aphyosemion koungueense (Sonnenberg, 2007)
- Aphyosemion labarrei Poll, 1951
- Aphyosemion lamberti Radda & Huber, 1977
- Aphyosemion lefiniense Woeltjes, 1984
- Aphyosemion lividum Legros & Zentz, 2007
- Aphyosemion loennbergii (Boulenger, 1903)
- Aphyosemion louessense (Pellegrin, 1931)
- Aphyosemion lugens Amiet, 1991
- Aphyosemion lujae (Boulenger, 1911)
- Aphyosemion maculatum Radda & Pürzl, 1977
- Aphyosemion malumbresi Legros & Zentz, 2006
- Aphyosemion melanogaster (Legros, Zentz & Agnèse, 2005)
- Aphyosemion melinoeides (Sonnenberg, 2007)
- Aphyosemion mengilai Valdesalici & Eberl, 2014
- Aphyosemion mimbon Huber, 1977
- Aphyosemion musafirii van der Zee & Sonnenberg, 2011
- Aphyosemion ocellatum Huber & Radda, 1977
- Aphyosemion ogoense (Pellegrin, 1930)
- Aphyosemion omega (Sonnenberg, 2007)
- Aphyosemion pamaense Agnèse, Legros, Cazaux & Estivals, 2013
- Aphyosemion pascheni (C. G. E. Ahl, 1928)
- Aphyosemion passaroi Huber, 1994
- Aphyosemion plagitaenium Huber, 2004
- Aphyosemion poliaki Amiet, 1991
- Aphyosemion polli Radda & Pürzl, 1987
- Aphyosemion primigenium Radda & Huber, 1977
- Aphyosemion pseudoelegans Sonnenberg & van der Zee, 2012
- Aphyosemion punctatum Radda & Pürzl, 1977
- Aphyosemion punctulatum (Legros, Zentz & Agnèse, 2005)
- Aphyosemion raddai Scheel, 1975
- Aphyosemion rectogoense Radda & Huber, 1977
- Aphyosemion riggenbachi (C. G. E. Ahl, 1924)
- Aphyosemion schioetzi Huber & Scheel, 1981
- Aphyosemion schluppi Radda & Huber, 1978
- Aphyosemion schoutedeni (Boulenger, 1920)
- Aphyosemion seegersi Huber, 1980
- Aphyosemion splendopleure (Brüning, 1929)
- Aphyosemion striatum (Boulenger, 1911)
- Aphyosemion teugelsi van der Zee & Sonnenberg, 2010
- Aphyosemion thysi Radda & Huber, 1978
- Aphyosemion tirbaki Huber, 1999
- Aphyosemion trilineatus (Brüning, 1930)
- Aphyosemion volcanum Radda & Wildekamp, 1977
- Aphyosemion wachtersi Radda & Huber, 1978
- Aphyosemion wildekampi Berkenkamp, 1973
- Aphyosemion wuendschi Radda & Pürzl, 1985 (Wuendsch's killifish)
- Aphyosemion zygaima Huber, 1981
