= Epiplatys sexfasciatus =

Conservation status
- Least Concern (IUCN 3.1)

Scientific classification
- Kingdom: Animalia
- Phylum: Chordata
- Class: Actinopterygii
- Order: Cyprinodontiformes
- Family: Nothobranchiidae
- Genus: Epiplatys
- Species: E. sexfasciatus

Binomial name
- Epiplatys sexfasciatus T. N. Gill, 1862

Synonyms
- Aplocheilus sexfasciatus (Gill, 1862); Haplochilus sexfasciatus (Gill, 1862); Panchax sexfasciatus (Gill, 1862)

Species of fish

Epiplatys sexfasciatus, the six-barred panchax. is a species of fish in the family Aplocheilidae that can be found in West and Central Africa. The fish is a timid surface dwelling predator. The six-barred panchax is up to 10 cm (4 in) long and closely resembles Epiplatys longiventralis.

This is the type species of the genus Epiplatys and was described by Theodore N. Gill in 1862 with the type locality given as Gabon.

== Sub-species ==
There are three recognized sub-species:

- Epiplatys sexfasciatus rathkei Radda, 1970
- Epiplatys sexfasciatus sexfasciatus T. N. Gill, 1862
- Epiplatys sexfasciatus togolensis Loiselle, 1971
