= Epiplatys grahami =

Conservation status
- Least Concern (IUCN 3.1)

Scientific classification
- Kingdom: Animalia
- Phylum: Chordata
- Class: Actinopterygii
- Order: Cyprinodontiformes
- Family: Nothobranchiidae
- Genus: Epiplatys
- Species: E. grahami

Binomial name
- Epiplatys grahami Boulenger, 1911

Species of fish

Epiplatys grahami is a species of killifish in the family Nothobranchiidae. It is an African rivuline that is native to the fresh water habitats from south-eastern Benin and through southern Nigeria and Cameroon to north-western Equatorial Guinea. This species reaches a length of 7.0 cm (2.8 in).

== Etymology ==
The species epithet is named in honor of medical entomologist W. M. Graham, who specialized in blood-sucking midges, and was the director of the Medical Research Institute in Lagos, Nigeria. It was he who presented the type specimen to the British Museum of Natural History.
