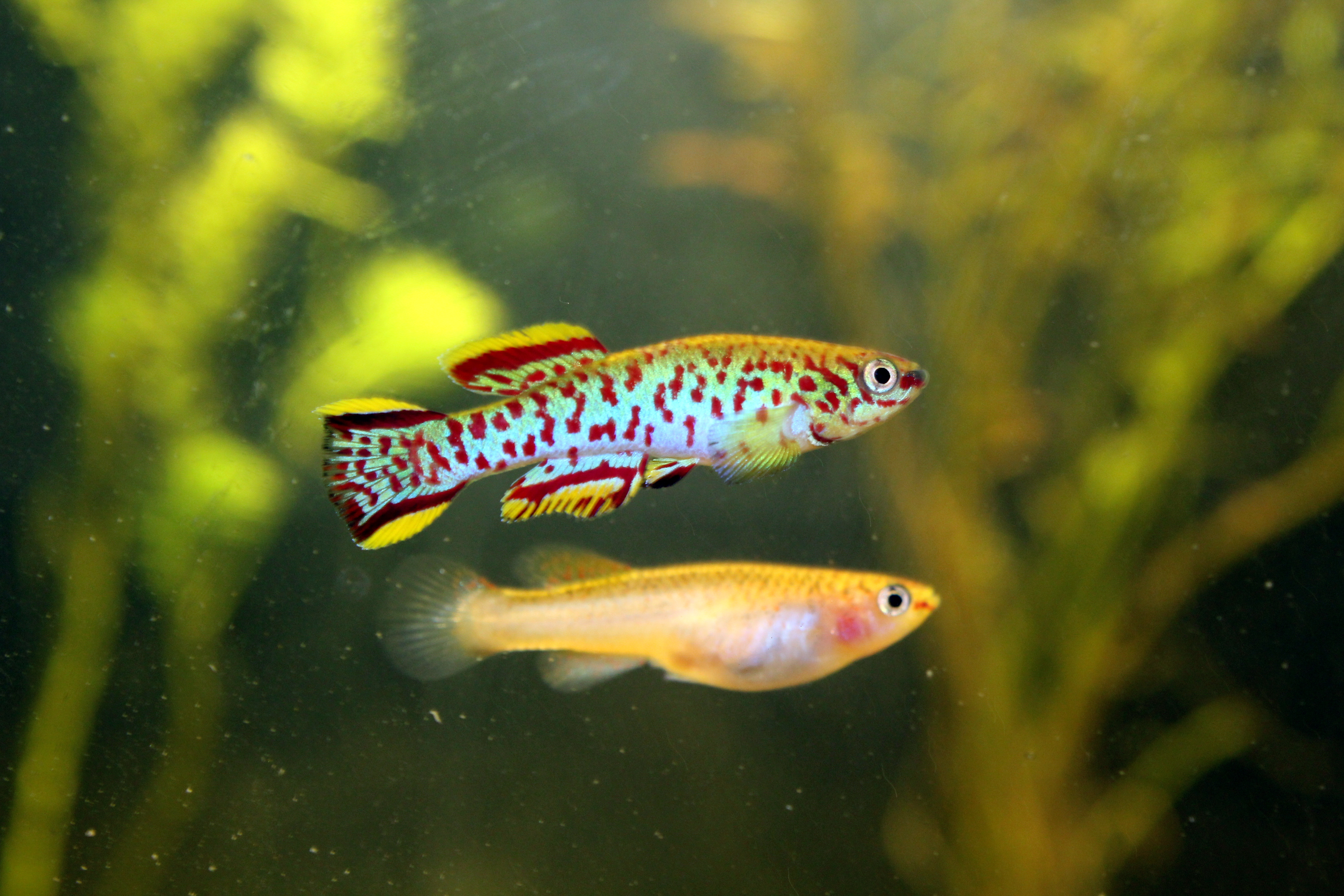
- Two individuals of the nigerianus population exhibiting sexual dimorphism

Conservation status
- Near Threatened (IUCN 3.1)

Scientific classification
- Kingdom: Animalia
- Phylum: Chordata
- Class: Actinopterygii
- Order: Cyprinodontiformes
- Family: Nothobranchiidae
- Genus: Fundulopanchax
- Species: F. gardneri

Binomial name
- Fundulopanchax gardneri (Boulenger, 1911)

Synonyms
- Fundulus gardneri Boulenger, 1911; Aphyosemion gardneri (Boulenger, 1911); Haplochilus brucii Boulenger, 1911; Aphyosemion brucii (Boulenger, 1911); Aphyosemion nigerianum Clausen, 1963; Aphyosemion obuduense Wright & Jeremy, 1974; Aphyosemion meridionale Kottelat, 1976

= Blue lyretail =

Species of fish

The blue lyretail (Fundulopanchax gardneri), also known as the Gardner's killi and formerly as the steel-blue aphyosemion, is a species of killifish. It is endemic to freshwater habitats in Nigeria and Cameroon.

== Description ==
Blue lyretails are sexually dimorphic. The males are more colourful than the females and have wavy lines of red spots which run along its body. The outer margins of the dorsal, anal and caudal fins are tinted with yellow. The females are less brightly coloured and have brown spots rather than red. They grow to a maximum total length of 6.5 centimetres (2.6 in).

== Distribution ==
The blue lyretail inhabits the tributary streams and marshes of the Benue and Cross River basins of Nigeria and Cameroon.

== Habitat and biology ==
The blue lyretail occurs in both savanna and forested regions. The males are larger, more colourful and have larger extendable fins than the females. The males are territorial. The waterbodies in which this species occurs are of an unpredictable nature and it has evolved a spawning strategy which is frequently referred to as a "switch" or "semi-annual" breeding strategy. This means that the eggs can survive a period of drying but that they are also viable when permanently submerged. Submerged eggs normally hatch in around 14–21 days depending on the temperature of the water. The eggs are laid on the bottom.

== Taxonomy ==
Fundulopanchax gardneri originally described in 1911 as Fundulus gardneri by George Albert Boulenger with the type locality given as Okwoga in the headwaters of Cross River, Nigeria. The type was collected by a Captain R.D. Gardner who is honoured in the specific name.

=== Subspecies ===
There are several valid subspecies:

- Blue lyretail – Fundulopanchax gardneri gardneri (Boulenger, 1911)
- Ejagham killi – Fundulopanchax gardneri lacustris (Langton, 1974)
- Mamfe killi – Fundulopanchax gardneri mamfensis (Radda, 1974)
- Nigerian killi – Fundulopanchax gardneri nigerianus (Clausen, 1963)

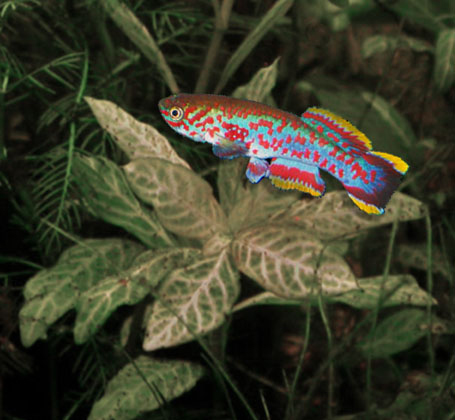
Fundulopanchax gardneri nigerianus "Makurdi" – adult male from a locality near Makurdi, Nigeria

== Human uses ==
Blue lyretails are harvested for the aquarium trade. They are apparently easy to maintain and breed although the males can be aggressive to other slower moving species. Gardner's killifish are generally kept in species-only tank, as they social are prone to becoming sexually frustrated at the lack of females, where then they will attempt to mate with often unrelated tankmates

== See also ==
- List of freshwater aquarium fish species
