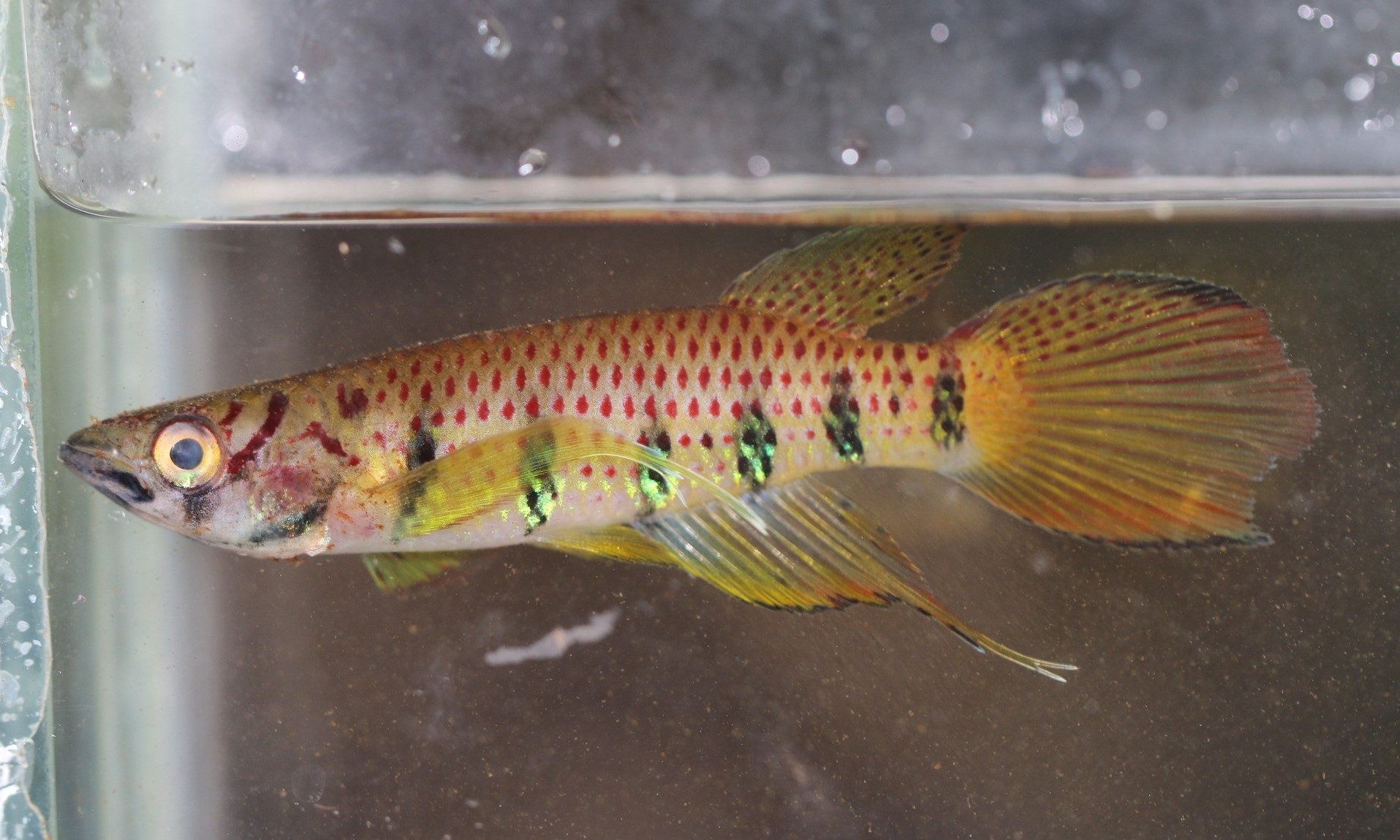

Conservation status
- Least Concern (IUCN 3.1)

Scientific classification
- Kingdom: Animalia
- Phylum: Chordata
- Class: Actinopterygii
- Order: Cyprinodontiformes
- Family: Nothobranchiidae
- Genus: Epiplatys
- Species: E. ansorgii

Binomial name
- Epiplatys ansorgii Boulenger, 1911

= Epiplatys ansorgii =

Species of fish

Epiplatys ansorgii is a species of killifish in the family Nothobranchiidae. It is an African rivuline that is native to fresh water habitats in the southern tributaries of the lower Ogowe River system and then southward to the lower Congo River system in West Africa.

== Description ==
Epiplatys ansorgii reaches a total length of 8.0 cm (3.1 in).

== Etymology ==
The species epithet is named in honor of explorer William John Ansorge (1850–1913), who obtained the type specimen.
