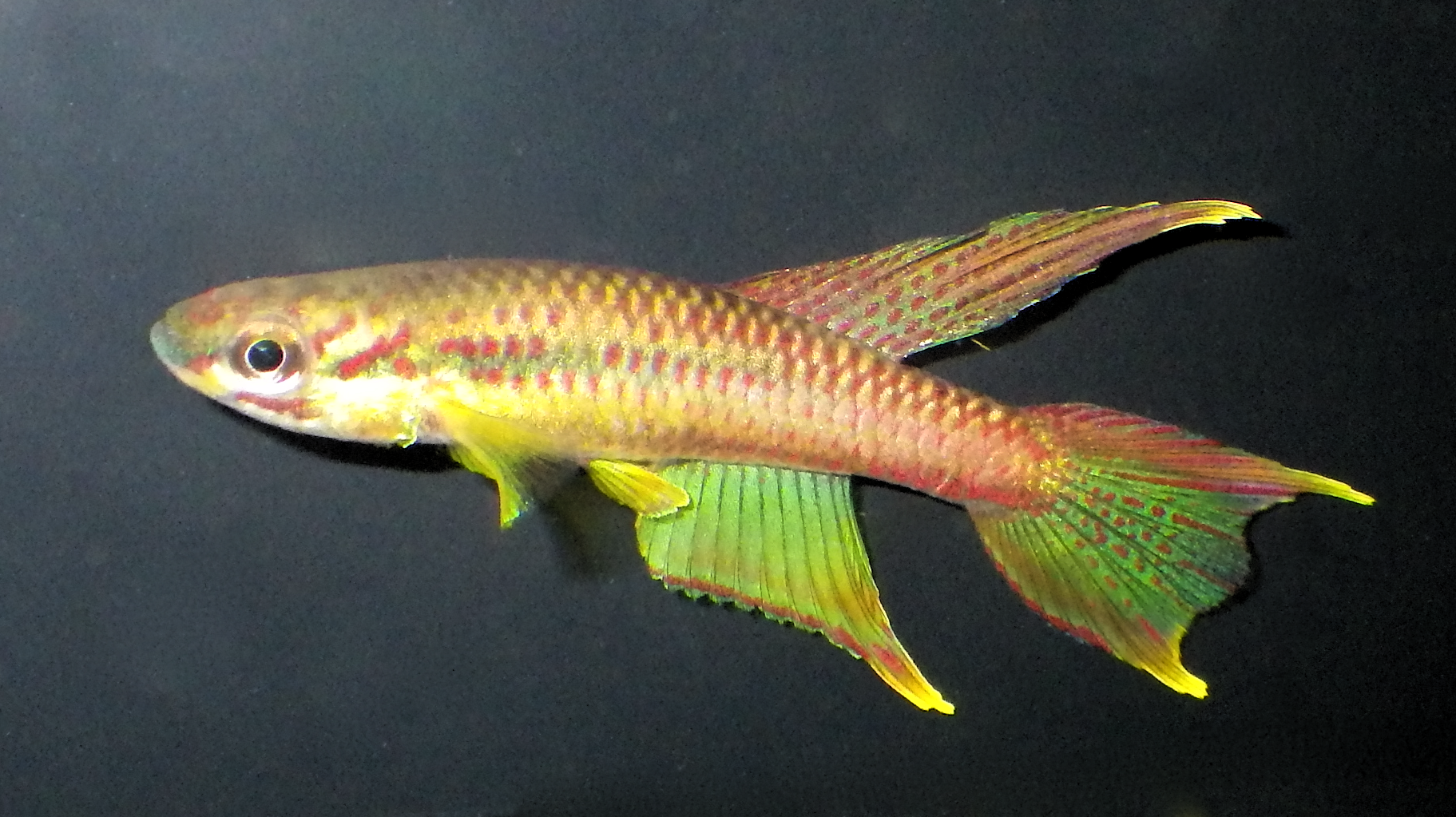
- Aphyosemion splendopleure 'Tiko Green' Male

Conservation status
- Least Concern (IUCN 3.1)

Scientific classification
- Kingdom: Animalia
- Phylum: Chordata
- Class: Actinopterygii
- Order: Cyprinodontiformes
- Family: Nothobranchiidae
- Genus: Aphyosemion
- Species: A. splendopleure

Binomial name
- Aphyosemion splendopleure (Brüning, 1929)

Synonyms
- Fundulopanchax splendopleuris Brüning, 1929; Chromaphyosemion splendopleure (Brüning 1929)

= Aphyosemion splendopleure =

Species of fish

Aphyosemion splendopleure is a species of freshwater fish belonging to the family Aplocheilidae. It is found in brooks and streams in Cameroon, Equatorial Guinea and Gabon.

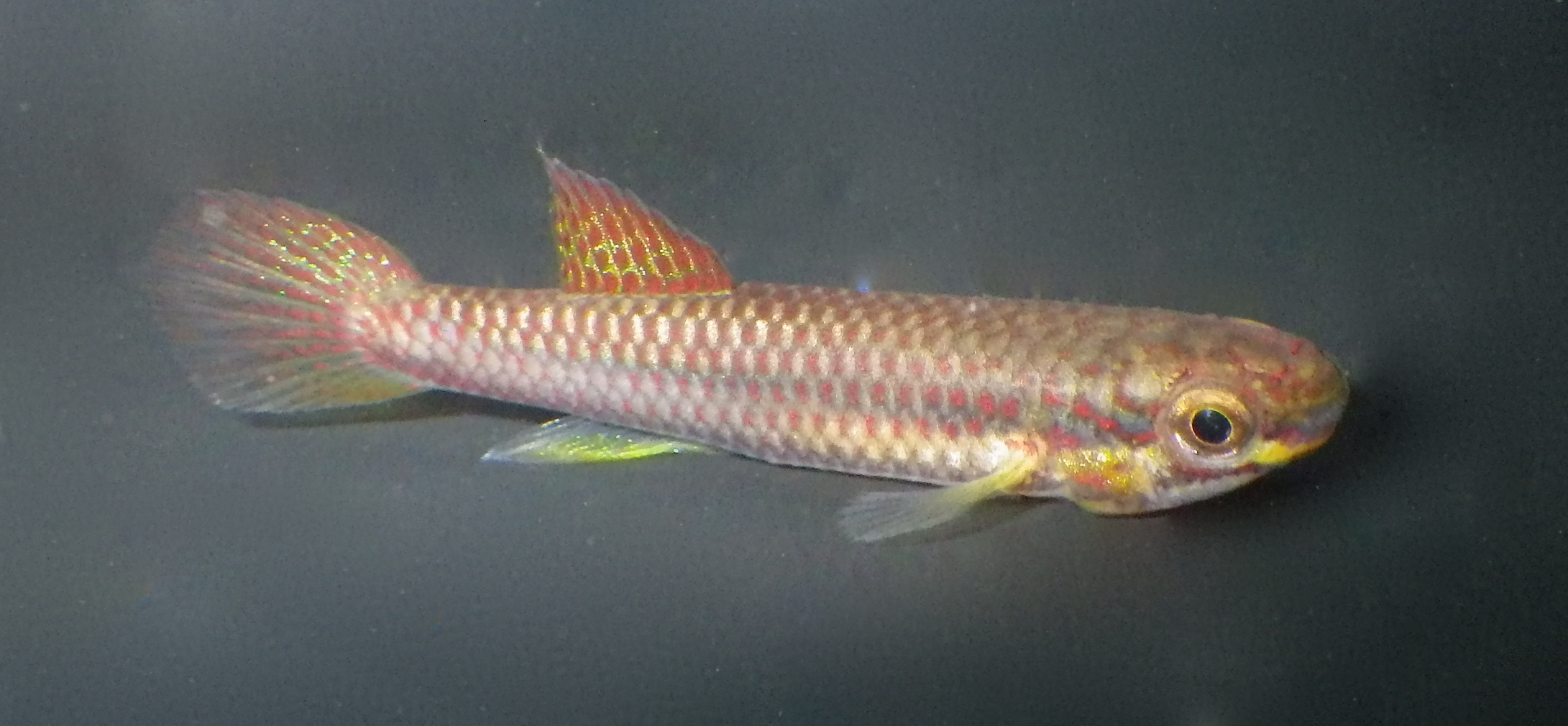
A. splendopleure female
