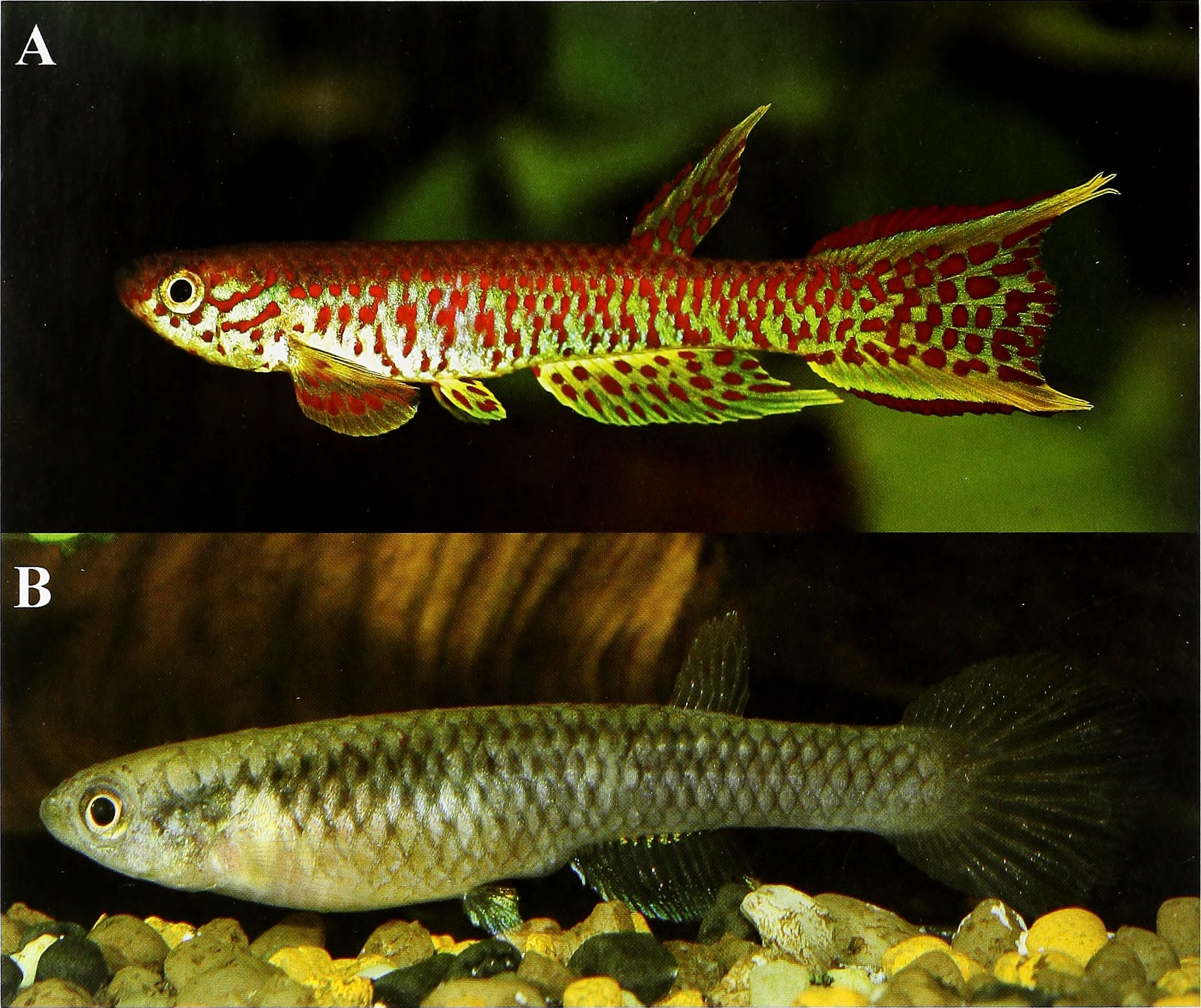
- Male (A) and female (B) of Aphyosemion elegans

Conservation status
- Least Concern (IUCN 3.1)

Scientific classification
- Kingdom: Animalia
- Phylum: Chordata
- Class: Actinopterygii
- Order: Cyprinodontiformes
- Family: Nothobranchiidae
- Genus: Aphyosemion
- Species: A. elegans

Binomial name
- Aphyosemion elegans (Boulenger, 1899)

Synonyms
- Haplochilus elegans Boulenger, 1899; Panchax elegans (Boulenger, 1899)

= Aphyosemion elegans =

Species of fish

Aphyosemion elegans, the elegant killifish, is a species of African rivulines (Nothobranchiidae) endemic to Africa, where it is found in the basin of the Congo River.
