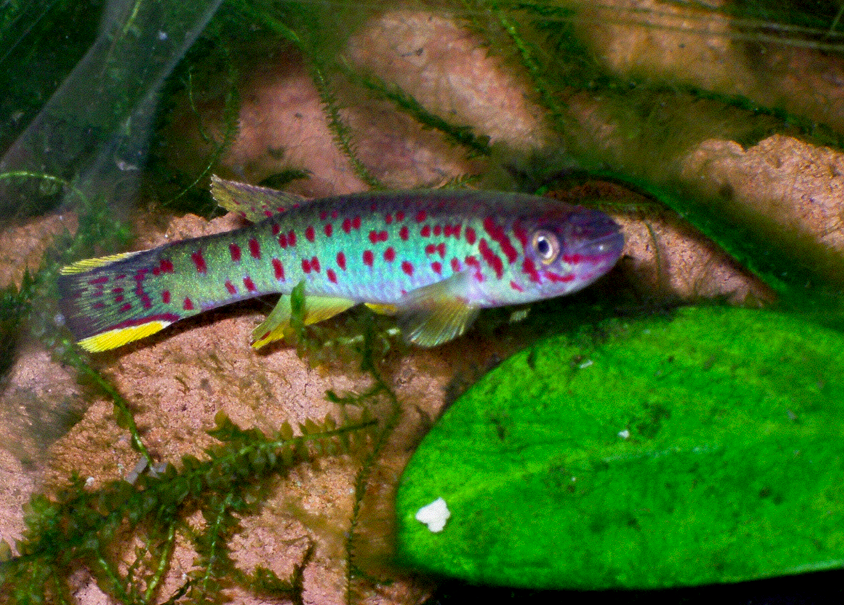

Conservation status
- Critically Endangered (IUCN 3.1)

Scientific classification
- Kingdom: Animalia
- Phylum: Chordata
- Class: Actinopterygii
- Order: Cyprinodontiformes
- Family: Nothobranchiidae
- Genus: Fundulopanchax
- Species: F. scheeli

Binomial name
- Fundulopanchax scheeli (Radda, 1970)

Synonyms
- Aphyosemion burundi Scheel, 1968; Aphyosemion scheeli Radda, 1970; Aphyosemion akamkpaense Radda, 1975

= Fundulopanchax scheeli =

Species of fish

Fundulopanchax scheeli, the emerald aphyosemion, is a species of killifish, endemic to the lower Cross River basin in Nigeria. It is a coastal rainforest fish which lives in small streams and ponds. It prefers a temperature of around 75 °F (24 °C), and a slightly acidic pH around 6–7. The specific name honours the Danish count, army colonel, explorer and ichthyologist Jørgen J. Scheel (1916–1989). F. scheeli grows to a maximum size of 6 centimetres (2.4 in) total length. It is considered to be critically endangered by the International Union for Conservation of Nature due to its very small area of occupancy and faces threats from herbicides and pesticides used in agriculture, such as in rice farming, and from deforestation.
