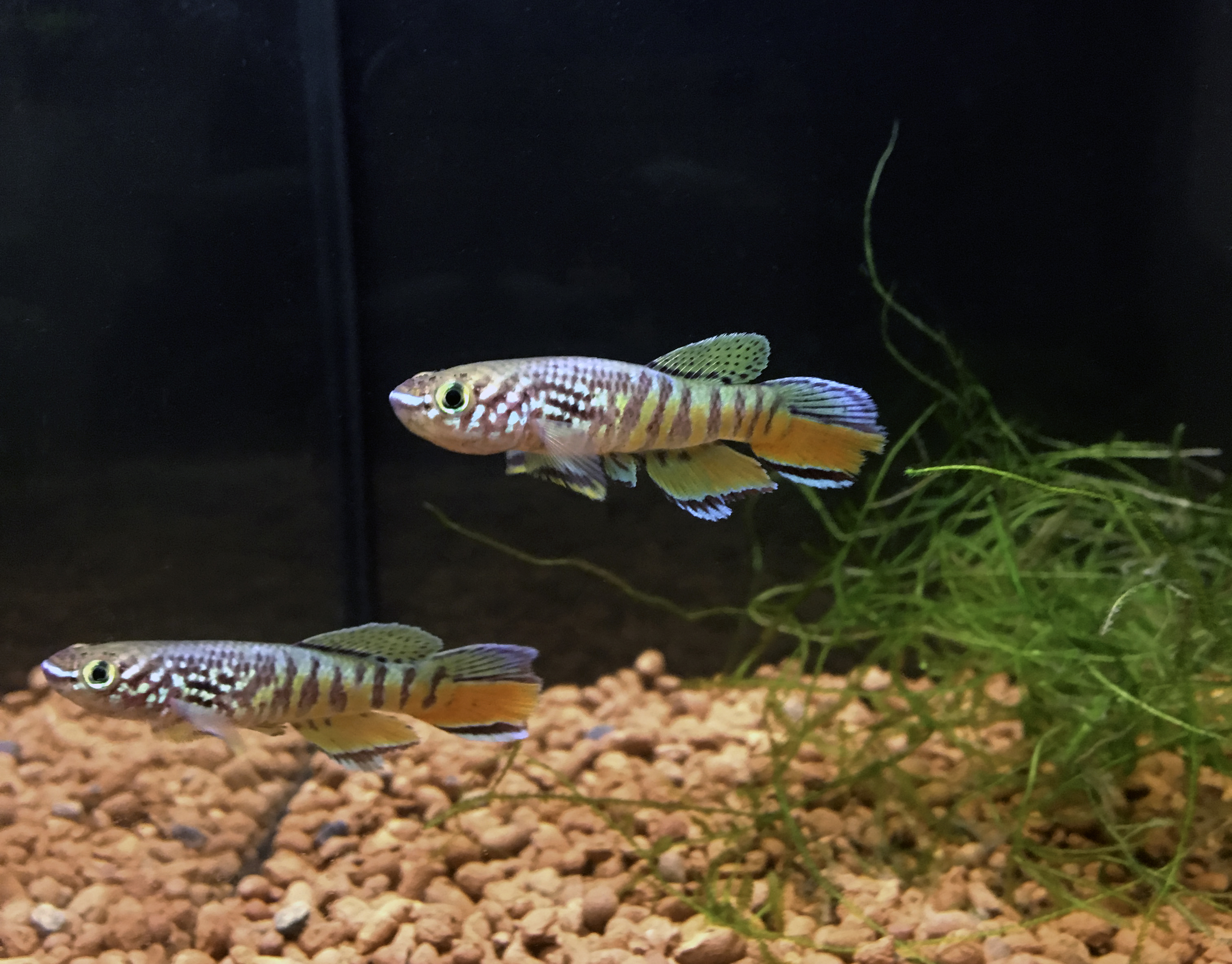
- Male in an aquarium

Conservation status
- Endangered (IUCN 3.1)

Scientific classification
- Kingdom: Animalia
- Phylum: Chordata
- Class: Actinopterygii
- Order: Cyprinodontiformes
- Family: Nothobranchiidae
- Genus: Fundulopanchax
- Species: F. sjostedti

Binomial name
- Fundulopanchax sjostedti (Lönnberg, 1895)
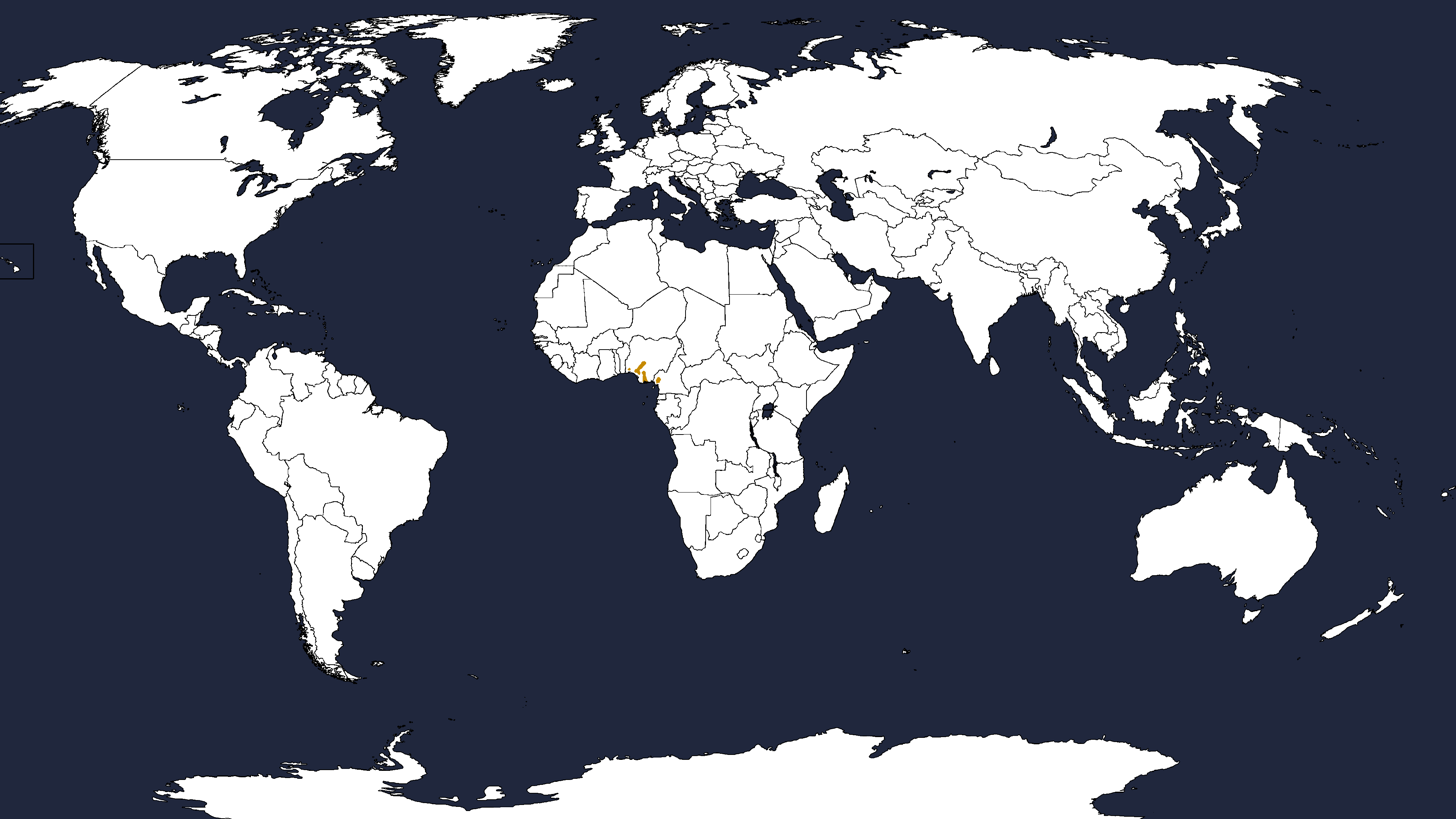

Synonyms
- Aphyosemion sjostedti (Lönnberg, 1895); Aphyosemion sjoestedti (Lönnberg, 1895); Fundulopanchax sjoestedti (Lönnberg, 1895); Fundulus gularis caerulea Boulenger, 1915; Aphyosemion caeruleum (Boulenger, 1915); Fundulopanchax caeruleus (Boulenger, 1915); Fundulus caeruleus Boulenger, 1915; Aphyosemion coeruleum (Boulenger, 1915); Fundulus zimmeri Ahl, 1924; Aphyosemion zimmeri (Ahl, 1924); Fundulopanchax zimmeri (Ahl, 1924)

= Fundulopanchax sjostedti =

Large African killifish

Fundulopanchax sjostedti, the blue gularis, golden pheasant gularis or red aphyosemion, is a species of toothcarp endemic to the Niger delta. It is only found in Nigeria and Cameroon.

== Etymology ==
It is named after the Swedish naturalist Bror Yngve Sjöstedt (1866–1948) who collected the type specimen close to a waterfall by the Ndian River, in the Ndian department in Cameroon's Southwest Region.

== Description ==
This species expresses sexual dimorphism. The males are more colourful and larger than the females, expressing very attractive colours. They outsize all other members of their genus, attaining lengths of 14 centimetres (5.5 in). It's a powerful and predatory species, feeding on invertebrates as well as small fish. However it's not the largest species of killifish; note for example the Gulf killifish (Fundulus grandis) which can reach a maximum length of 18 centimetres (7.1 in).
