= Enteromius clauseni =

Conservation status
- Critically Endangered (IUCN 3.1)

Scientific classification
- Kingdom: Animalia
- Phylum: Chordata
- Class: Actinopterygii
- Order: Cypriniformes
- Family: Cyprinidae
- Subfamily: Smiliogastrinae
- Genus: Enteromius
- Species: E. clauseni

Binomial name
- Enteromius clauseni (Thys van den Audenaerde, 1976)

Synonyms
- Barbus clauseni Thys van den Audenaerde, 1976

Species of fish

Enteromius clauseni is a species of ray-finned fish in the genus Enteromius which is known from only a single location on the Yewa River in Nigeria and Benin.

== Size ==
This species reaches a length of 3.0 cm (1.2 in).

== Etymology ==
The fish is named in honor of ichthyologist Herluf Stenholt Clausen who collected the type specimen.
