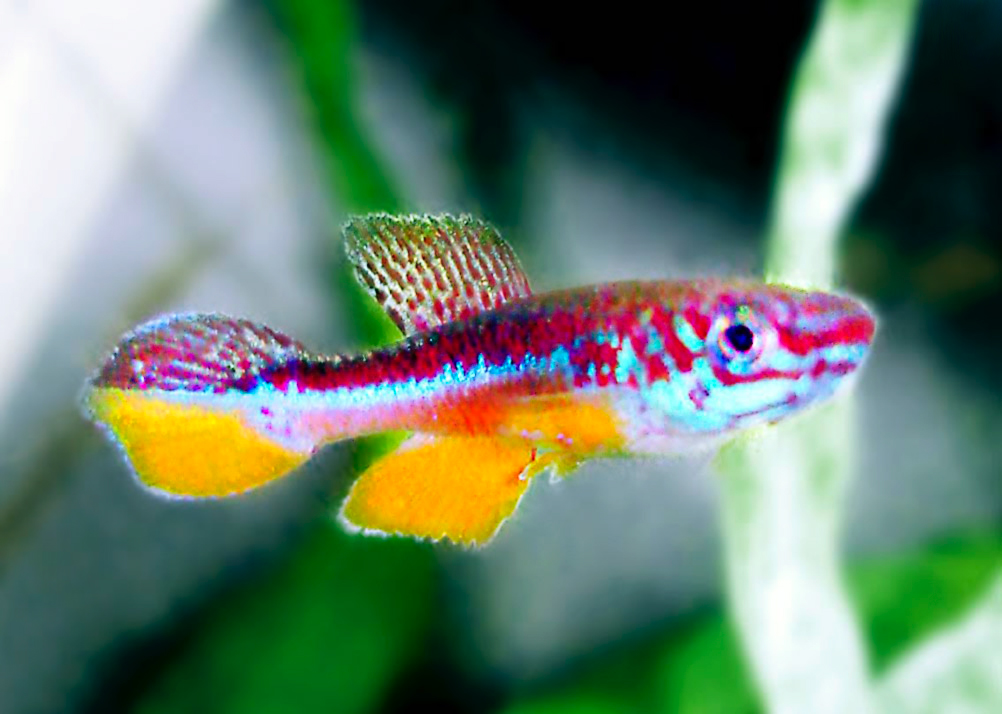
- Adult male.

Conservation status
- Data Deficient (IUCN 3.1)

Scientific classification
- Kingdom: Animalia
- Phylum: Chordata
- Class: Actinopterygii
- Order: Cyprinodontiformes
- Family: Nothobranchiidae
- Genus: Fundulopanchax
- Species: F. avichang

Binomial name
- Fundulopanchax avichang Malumbres & Castelo, 1970

= Fundulopanchax avichang =

Species of fish

Fundulopanchax avichang is a species of African killifish that mainly inhabits small temporary pools of the Ecucu River drainage systems. The species is endemic to Equatorial Guinea. Adult fish reach a maximum length of approximately 2.6 centimetres (1.0 inch). Breeding pairs of the species most often lay their eggs over the bottom, but occasionally also among the roots of free-floating aquatic plants. Pairs stay close for some time, with just a few eggs being produced each day.
