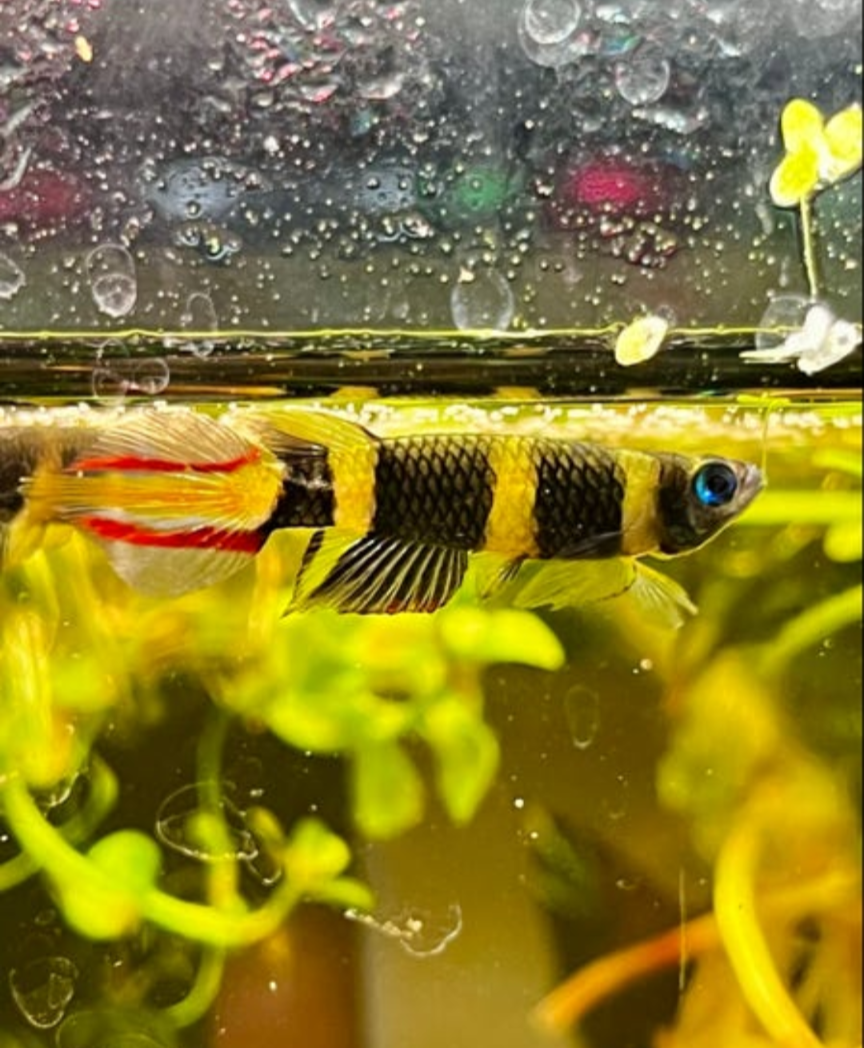

Conservation status
- Least Concern (IUCN 3.1)

Scientific classification
- Kingdom: Animalia
- Phylum: Chordata
- Class: Actinopterygii
- Order: Cyprinodontiformes
- Family: Nothobranchiidae
- Genus: Epiplatys
- Species: E. annulatus

Binomial name
- Epiplatys annulatus (Boulenger, 1915)

Synonyms
- Haplochilus annulatus Boulenger, 1915; Aplocheilus annulatus (Boulenger, 1915); Panchax annulatus (Boulenger, 1915); Pseudepiplatys annulatus (Boulenger, 1915)

= Clown killi =

Species of fish

The clown killi (Epiplatys annulatus) or banded panchax, is a species of fish in the family Nothobranchiidae, an African rivuline, native to fresh water habitats in Guinea, Liberia and Sierra Leone in West Africa.

This species was described as Haplochilus annulatus by George Albert Boulenger in 1915 with the type locality given as most likely to be Maka at the mouth of the Moa River in Sierra Leone. The binomial consists of the generic name which is a compound of the Greek words ἐπί (epí) referring to 'above, on top of' and πλατύς (platýs) referring to 'flat, broad'. The specific name annulatus is Latin and refers to the 'ring' lateral pattern.
