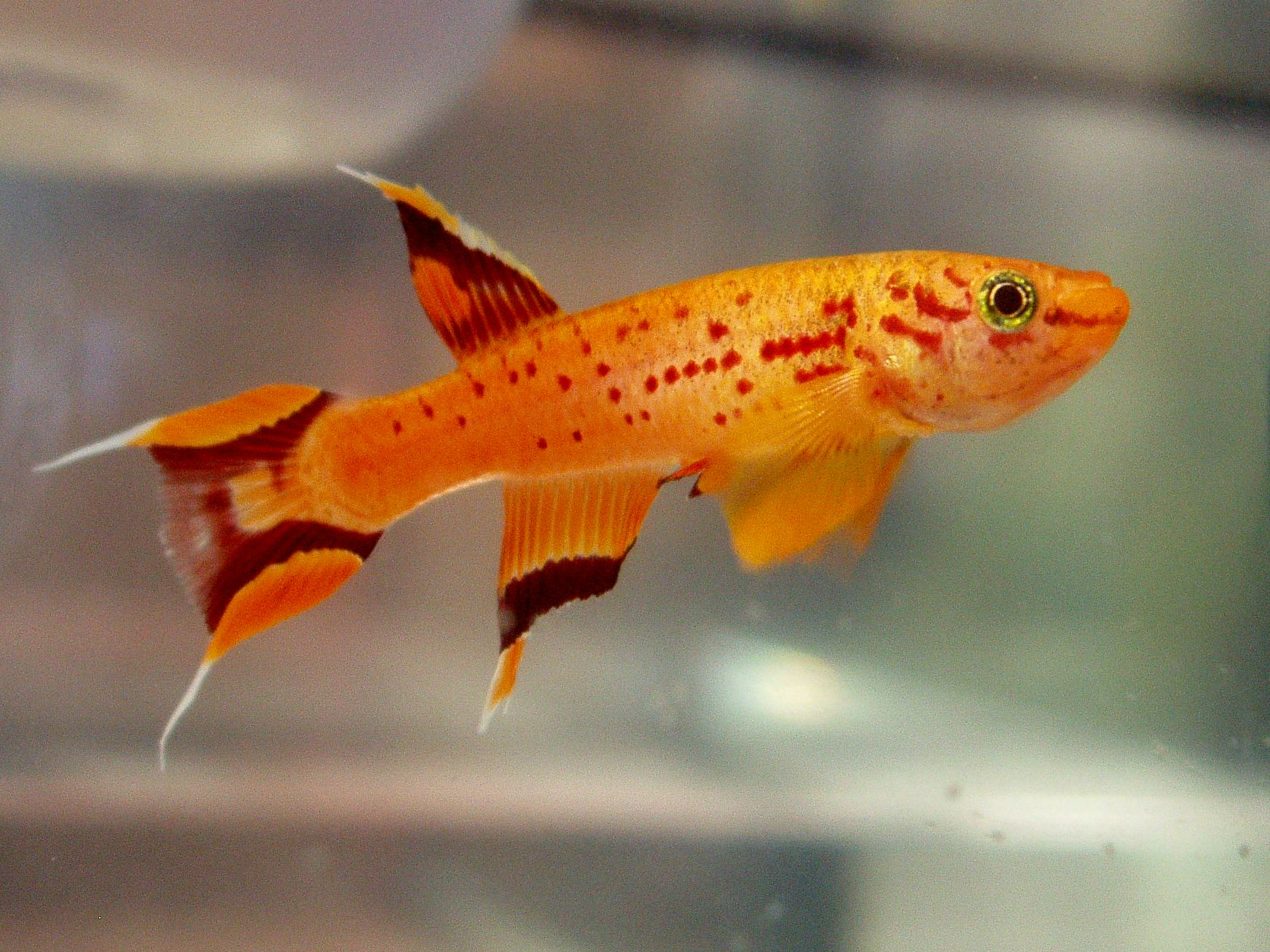
- Golden variety of Aphyosemion australe Male

Conservation status
- Least Concern (IUCN 3.1)

Scientific classification
- Kingdom: Animalia
- Phylum: Chordata
- Class: Actinopterygii
- Division: Teleostei
- Order: Cyprinodontiformes
- Family: Nothobranchiidae
- Genus: Aphyosemion
- Species: A. australe

Binomial name
- Aphyosemion australe (Rachow, 1921)

Synonyms
- Panchax polychromus Ahl, 1924; Aphyosemion polychromum (Ahl, 1924); Aphyosemion hjerresensii Meinken, 1953

= Aphyosemion australe =

Species of fish

Aphyosemion australe, the lyretail panchax, golden panchax or Cape Lopez lyretail, is a species of freshwater fish belonging to the family Aplocheilidae. It is found around Cape Lopez and in surrounding areas in Gabon.

== Appearance ==
A. australe comes in a two colours. The wild type are brown and called 'chocolate' in the aquarium hobby and a man made 'gold' form exists which is orange; this form was spontaneous mutation bred by a Finnish aquarist name Hjerssen in 1952. JJ Scheel in "Rivulins of the World World (TFH PRess, 1970) pointed out these were not a separate species and deprecated the name Aphyosemion australe hjersseni. An Albino strain appeared from the "hjersseni" strain around early 2022 and there are also darker "chocolate" and "spotless" varieties in the aquarium hobby. Males can reach a length of around six cm, with females being slightly smaller. The caudal fin is lyre-shaped, which is characteristic of the genus. The females also are less colourful; their body colouration is brownish tan for the wild form and a light tan for the gold/orange form, and they have rounder fins.

== In the aquarium ==
The Cape Lopez lyretail is one of the most popular and commonly available species of killifish. Spawns readily in the aquarium in nearly any water, spawning in fine-leafed water plants, such as aquatic moss. The fry emerge after 14 days at a preferred temperature of 26 °C (79 °F). They adapt well to any variety of commercially prepared foods, flake or frozen livefoods but like all killifish do better with living foods cultured or caught from clean sources.
