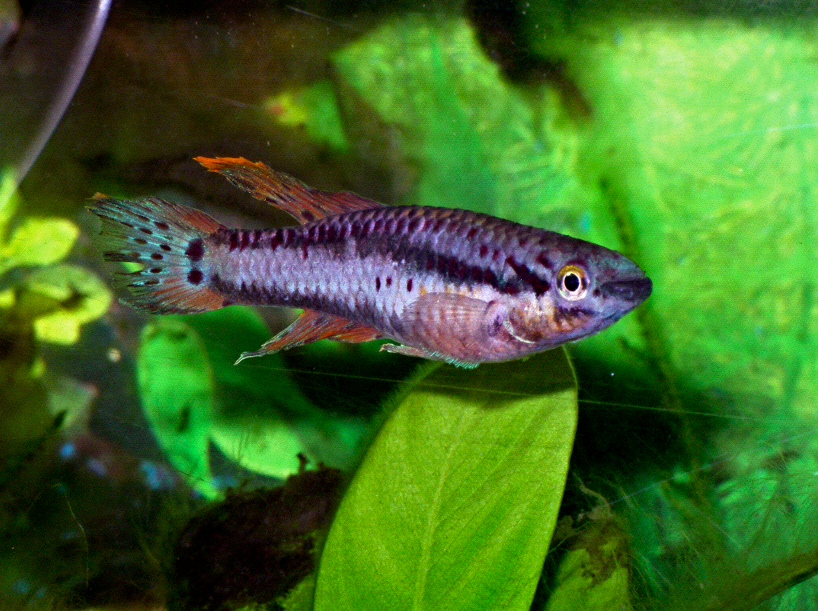
- Aphyosemion bivittatum Male

Conservation status
- Least Concern (IUCN 3.1)

Scientific classification
- Kingdom: Animalia
- Phylum: Chordata
- Class: Actinopterygii
- Order: Cyprinodontiformes
- Family: Nothobranchiidae
- Genus: Aphyosemion
- Species: A. bivittatum

Binomial name
- Aphyosemion bivittatum (Lönnberg, 1895)

Synonyms
- Chromaphyosemion bivittatum (Lönnberg, 1895); Fundulus bivittatus (Lönnberg, 1895); Aphyosemion hollyi Myers, 1933

= Aphyosemion bivittatum =

Species of fish

Aphyosemion bivittatum (twostripe lyretail, two-banded killi, red lyretail) is a species of freshwater fish belonging to the family Aplocheilidae. It is found in rivers in southeastern Nigeria and southwestern Cameroon. It was originally described as Fundulus bivittatus by Swedish zoologist Einar Lönnberg in 1895. The holotype was discovered near a waterfall in the Ndian River in Cameroon and currently is located in the Stockholm Museum.

== Appearance ==
A. bivittatum has an elongated, brightly coloured body with two dark bands made up of red spots running along each side, with the colors varying between populations. Individual males are commonly found with golden-brown dorsal surfaces, bluish sides, and golden ventral surfaces. The males have a maximum body length of approximately 5 centimetres (2.0 in) and have brightly marked, tall and pointed anal and dorsal fins that are yellow to pastel green with red edges. The caudal and dorsal fins are green with red spots and bright yellow tips. It has 10–13 spines in its dorsal fin and 12–15 in its anal fin.

== Habitat ==
The species is found in small calcium rich steams in the coastal rainforests of southeastern Nigeria and southwestern Cameroon. They are benthopelagic, meaning they float just above the riverbed. They prefer water with a pH of 6 to 6.5 and temperature of 22 to 24 °C (72 to 75 °F).
