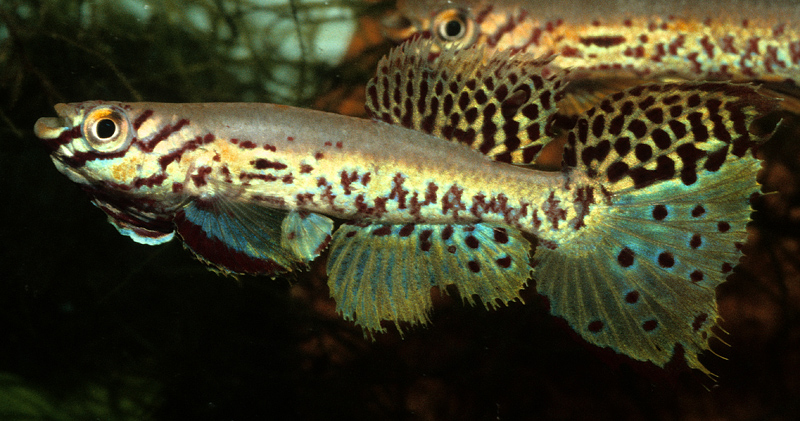
- Adult male.

Conservation status
- Endangered (IUCN 3.1)

Scientific classification
- Kingdom: Animalia
- Phylum: Chordata
- Class: Actinopterygii
- Order: Cyprinodontiformes
- Family: Nothobranchiidae
- Genus: Fundulopanchax
- Species: F. fallax

Binomial name
- Fundulopanchax fallax (Ahl, 1935)

Synonyms
- Aphyosemion fallax Ahl, 1935; Aphyosemion gulare schwoiseri Scheel & Radda, 1974; Aphyosemion schwoiseri Scheel & Radda, 1974; Fundulopanchax schwoiseri (Scheel & Radda), 1974; Aphyosemion kribianum Radda, 1975

= Kribi killi =

Species of fish

Kribi killi (Fundulopanchax kribianus) is a species of African killifish that mainly inhabits swamps and turbid parts of brooks in the coastal rainforest. The species is endemic to Cameroon. Adult fish reach a maximum length of approximately 9 centimetres (3.5 inches). Breeding pairs of the species most often lay their eggs over the bottom, but occasionally also among the roots of free-floating aquatic plants. Pairs stay close for some time, with just a few eggs being produced each day. It is sometimes kept in captivity but moderately difficult to maintain and breed in an aquarium. Nonetheless, the species has been maintained in aquaria since 1905 as documented by Arnold, Meinken and Ahl, who described F. fallax in 1939, decades after its first commercial importation.

The fish from Kribi is F. kribianus, F. schwoiseri is found in Malende, while F. fallax is found in Mouanka and Fifindi, there are morphological differences visible to the naked eye that differentiate these species. Additionally, the species can be found in several color morphs in the Terra Typica - in the care of F. kribianum: orange, blue and yellow.
