= Kili =

Kili may refer to the following:

== People ==
- Justin Kili (c. 1953-2015), Papua New Guinean media personality, journalist, activist, and pioneer
- Kili Lefotu (born 1983), American football player

== Places ==
- Kili, a nickname for Mount Kilimanjaro
- Kili, India, site of the Battle of Kili, a 1299 victory of the Delhi Sultanate over the Mongols
- Kili Island, in the Marshall Islands
  - Kili Airport, on Kili Island

== Other uses ==
- Kíli, a Dwarf from J. R. R. Tolkien's novel The Hobbit
- KILI, a radio station in Porcupine, South Dakota
- Kili language, a Tungusic language of Russia and China

== See also ==
- Kilis, a city in south-central Turkey, administrative centre of Kilis Province
- Kilis Province, south-central Turkey
  - Kilis (electoral district)
- Emirate of Kilis, a medieval emirate
- Koili, a village near Paphos, Greece
