= Jørgen Jacob Scheel =

Danish ichthyologist (1916–1989)

Jørgen Jacob Scheel (born Randers Municipality 9 February 1916, died 13 April 1989) was a Danish aristocrat, soldier, explorer and ichthyologist. His father was Jørgen Carl Scheel (1874-1944) and his mother was Erikka Ellen Estrup (1891-1960); his parents married in 1912. He was baptized in the Marie Magdalene Church in Sønderhald. Scheel was a landgrave of the Danish aristocracy.

Scheel joined the Royal Danish Army as a Sekonløjtnant in the infantry in 1939, being promoted to Løjtnant in the Royal Life Guards in the same year. In 1939 he also married Anne-Sophie Emerentze Gyldenkrone in Copenhagen on 15 July. They had four children Suzanne, Anne Beate, Christiane and Christian Detlev.

In 1954 he was a Kaptajn in the Guards and he ended his military career as an Oberst in command of Denmark's Defence Motor School.

Scheel is best known for his activities as an aquarist and ichthyologist. He did much to promote the hobby of fish keeping in Denmark and beyond and wrote a number of books on the subject. He also undertook a number of expeditions, often funded by the Carlsberg Foundation. On these expeditions Scheel discovered many new species of fish, especially killifishes, which he described. He was an honorary member of many aquarium societies in Denmark and elsewhere and was given an honorary doctorate by the University of Giessen in 1973. The African killifish Fundulopanchax scheeli is named in his honour.
