= Herluf Stenholt Clausen =

Danish ichthyologist

Claus Herluf Stenholt Clausen
- Born: October 21, 1921; Los Angeles
- Died: 2002 (aged 80–81)
- Occupation: Ichthyologist

Claus Herluf Stenholt Clausen (October 21, 1921, Los Angeles – 2002) was a Danish ichthyologist, known for his work on the river fish of West Africa. Although often cited as H. S. Clausen, he published as H. Stenholt Clausen, with the compound surname Stenholt Clausen. He worked for many years at the University College of Ibadan in Nigeria.

== Taxon named in his honor ==
- Phractura clauseni, a species of catfish, is named in his honor, as is the ray-finned fish
- Enteromius clauseni.

== Family ==
His son, Ian Henning Stenholt Clausen, became an arachnologist.
