= List of least concern fishes =

- Extinct in the wild (EW): 11 species
- Critically endangered (CR): 906 species
- Endangered (EN): 1,533 species
- Vulnerable (VU): 1,740 species
- Near threatened (NT, LR/cd): 1,042 species
- Least concern (LC): 18,621 species
- Data deficient (DD): 5,492 species
Fish species (IUCN, 2025-2)
- 29,447 extant species have been evaluated
- 23,955 of those are fully assessed (Note: excludes data deficient evaluations.)
- 19,663 are not threatened at present
- 4,292 to 9,784 are threatened (Note: Threatened comprises CR, EN and VU. Upper estimate additionally includes DD.)
- 113 to 268 are extinct or extinct in the wild:
  - 102 extinct (EX) species (Note: Chart omits extinct (EX) species)
  - 11 extinct in the wild (EW)
  - 147 possibly extinct [CR(PE)]
  - 8 possibly extinct in the wild [CR(PEW)]

As of September 2016, the International Union for Conservation of Nature (IUCN) lists 9131 least concern fish species. 60% of all evaluated fish species are listed as least concern. The IUCN also lists 37 fish subspecies as least concern.

Of the subpopulations of fishes evaluated by the IUCN, 44 species subpopulations have been assessed as least concern.

This is a complete list of least concern fish species and subspecies evaluated by the IUCN. Species and subspecies which have least concern subpopulations (or stocks) are indicated.

== Lobe-finned fishes ==
- South American lungfish (Lepidosiren paradoxa)
- Marbled lungfish (Protopterus aethiopicus)
- Gilled African lungfish (Protopterus amphibius)
- West African lungfish (Protopterus annectens)
- Spotted African lungfish (Protopterus dolloi)

== Cartilaginous fishes ==
Chondrichthyes includes sharks, rays, skates, and sawfish. There are 313 species and two subpopulations of cartilaginous fish assessed as least concern.

=== Rays and skates ===
There are 148 species in the order Rajiformes assessed as least concern.

==== Guitarfish species ====
- Eastern shovelnose ray (Aptychotrema rostrata)
- Southern shovelnose ray (Aptychotrema vincentiana)
- Bluntnose guitarfish (Rhinobatos blochii)
- Goldeneye shovelnose ray (Rhinobatos sainsburyi)
- Southern fiddler ray (Trygonorrhina dumerilii)
- Eastern fiddler ray (Trygonorrhina fasciata)

==== Whiptail stingrays ====
- Short-tail stingray (Bathytoshia brevicaudata)
- Broad stingray (Bathytoshia lata)
- Atlantic stingray (Hypanus sabinus)
- Black-spotted whipray (Maculabatis astra)
- Arabian banded whipray (Maculabatis randalli)
- Brown whipray (Maculabatis toshi)
- Painted maskray (Neotrygon leylandi)
- Peppered maskray (Neotrygon picta)
- Pelagic stingray (Pteroplatytrygon violacea)
- Bluespotted ribbontail ray (Taeniura lymma)
- Freshwater whipray (Urogymnus dalyensis)

==== Narcinids ====
- Blind torpedo (Benthobatis marcida)
- Dark blind ray (Benthobatis moresbyi)
- Ocellated electric ray (Diplobatis ommata)
- Apron ray (Discopyge tschudii)
- Lesser electric ray (Narcine bancroftii)
- Brown numbfish (Narcine brunnea)
- Western numbfish (Narcinops lasti)
- Eastern numbfish (Narcinops nelsoni)
- Ornate numbfish (Narcinops ornatus)
- Tasmanian numbfish (Narcinops tasmaniensis)
- Banded numbfish (Narcinops westraliensis)

==== Hardnose skates ====
- Broad skate (Amblyraja badia)
- Southern thorny skate (Amblyraja doellojuradoi)
- Arctic skate (Amblyraja hyperborea)
- Jensen's skate (Amblyraja jenseni)
- Bigmouth skate (Amblyraja robertsi)
- Deepsea skate (Bathyraja abyssicola)
- Aguja skate (Bathyraja aguja)
- Peruvian skate (Bathyraja peruana)
- Big skate (Beringraja binoculata)
- Blackbelly shortskate (Breviraja nigriventralis)
- Spiny shortskate (Breviraja spinosa)
- Longnose skate (Caliraja rhina)
- Skilletskate (Dactylobatus armatus)
- Hookskate (Dactylobatus clarkii)
- Lempriere's skate (Dentiraja lemprieri)
- Brown bight skate (Dipturus acrobelus)
- Pale tropical skate (Dipturus apricus)
- Graham's skate (Dipturus grahami)
- Heald's skate (Dentiraja healdi)
- New Zealand smooth skate (Dipturus innominatus)
- Ocellate skate (Dentiraja oculus)
- Argus skate (Dipturus polyommata)
- Slimeskate (Dipturus pullopunctatus)
- Caribbean skate (Dipturus teevani)
- Weng's skate (Dipturus wengi)
- Atlantic finless skate (Gurgesiella atlantica)
- Dusky finless skate (Gurgesiella furvescens)
- Little skate (Leucoraja erinacea)
- Rosette skate (Leucoraja garmani)
- Freckled skate (Leucoraja lentiginosa)
- Cuckoo skate (Leucoraja naevus)
- Sawback skate (Leucoraja pristispina)
- Yellospotted skate (Leucoraja wallacei)
- Krefft's skate (Malacoraja kreffti)
- Soft skate (Malacoraja spinacidermis)
- Blue pygmy skate (Neoraja caerulea)
- Iberian pygmy skate (Neoraja iberica)
- African dwarf skate (Neoraja stehmanni)
- Arafura skate (Okamejei arafurensis)
- Thintail skate (Okamejei leptoura)
- Clearnose skate (Raja eglanteria)
- California skate (Raja inornata)
- Brown skate (Raja miraletus)
- Spotted skate (Raja montagui)
- Speckled ray (Raja polystigma)
- Pacific starry skate (Raja stellulata)
- Bigthorn skate (Rajella barnardi)
- Deepwater ray (Rajella bathyphila)
- Bigelow's ray (Rajella bigelowi)
- Munchkin skate (Rajella caudaspinosa)
- Challenger skate (Rajella challengeri)
- Ghost skate (Rajella dissimilis)
- Sooty skate (Rajella fuliginea)
- Round ray (Rajella fyllae)
- Mid-atlantic skate (Rajella kukujevi)
- Leopard skate (Rajella leopardus)
- Sailray (Rajella lintea)
- Blackish skate (Rajella nigerrima)
- Purplebelly skate (Rajella purpuriventralis)
- Smoothback skate (Rajella ravidula)
- Brazilian skate (Rajella sadowskii)
- Ocellate skate (Rostroraja ackleyi)
- Bahama skate (Rostroraja bahamensis)
- Clearnose skate (Rostroraja eglanteria)
- Roundel skate (Rostroraja texana)
- New Zealand rough skate (Zearaja nasutus)

==== Urolophids ====
- Yellow shovelnose stingaree (Trygonoptera galba)
- Eastern shovelnose stingaree (Trygonoptera imitata)
- Western shovelnose stingaree (Trygonoptera mucosa)
- Striped stingaree (Trygonoptera ovalis)
- Masked stingaree (Trygonoptera personata)
- Common stingaree (Trygonoptera testacea)
- Circular stingaree (Urolophus circularis)
- Crossback stingaree (Urolophus cruciatus)
- Chesterfield Island stingaree (Urolophus deforgesi)
- Wide stingaree (Urolophus expansus)
- Patchwork stingaree (Urolophus flavomosaicus)
- Spotted stingaree (Urolophus gigas)
- Lobed stingaree (Urolophus lobatus)
- Mitotic stingaree (Urolophus mitosis)
- New Caledonian stingaree (Urolophus neocaledoniensis)
- Butterfly stingaree (Urolophus papilio)
- Sparsely-spotted stingaree (Urolophus paucimaculatus)
- Coral Sea stingaree (Urolophus piperatus)
- Brown stingaree (Urolophus westraliensis)

==== Softnose skates ====
- Aguja skate (Bathyraja aguja)
- Aleutian skate (Bathyraja aleutica)
- Little-eyed skate (Bathyraja andriashevi)
- Dark-mouth skate (Bathyraja arctowskii)
- Bottom skate (Bathyraja bergi)
- Broadnose skate (Bathyraja brachyurops)
- Cousseau's skate (Bathyraja cousseauae)
- Dusky-pink skate (Bathyraja diplotaenia)
- Eaton's skate (Bathyraja eatonii)
- Cinnamon skate (Bathyraja fedorovi)
- West African skate (Bathyraja hesperafricana)
- Bering skate (Bathyraja interrupta)
- Challenger's skate (Bathyraja isotrachys)
- Sandpaper skate (Bathyraja kincaidii)
- Domino skate (Bathyraja leucomelanos)
- Commander skate (Bathyraja lindbergi)
- Slimtail skate (Bathyraja longicauda)
- McCain's skate (Bathyraja maccaini)
- White-blotched skate (Bathyraja maculata)
- Magellan skate (Bathyraja magellanica)
- Butterfly skate (Bathyraja mariposa)
- Dusky-purple skate (Bathyraja matsubarai)
- Darkbelly skate (Bathyraja meridionalis)
- Fine-spined skate (Bathyraja microtrachys)
- Whitebrow skate (Bathyraja minispinosa)
- Murray's skate (Bathyraja murrayi)
- Pacific Blonde skate (Bathyraja pacifica)
- Pallid skate (Bathyraja pallida)
- Leopard skate (Bathyraja panthera)
- Atlantic butterfly skate (Bathyraja papilionifera)
- Alaska skate (Bathyraja parmifera)
- Peruvian skate (Bathyraja peruana)
- Richardson's ray (Bathyraja richardsoni)
- Cuphead skate (Bathyraja scaphiops)
- Whitemouth skate (Bathyraja schroederi)
- Golden skate (Bathyraja smirnovi)
- Softnose skate (Bathyraja smithii)
- Pacific white skate (Bathyraja spinosissima)
- Mud skate (Bathyraja taranetzi)
- Eremo skate (Bathyraja trachouros)
- Roughtail skate (Bathyraja trachura)
- Cristina's skate (Bathyraja tunae)
- Creamback skate (Bathyraja tzinovskii)
- Okhotsk skate (Bathyraja violacea)
- Western looseskin skate (Insentiraja subtilispinosa)
- Southern round skate (Irolita waitii)
- Notoraja azurea
- Broken Ridge skate (Notoraja lira)
- Blotched skate (Notoraja sticta)
- Allens skate (Pavoraja alleni)
- Mosaic skate (Pavoraja mosaica)
- Peacock skate (Pavoraja nitida)
- False peacock skate (Pavoraja pseudonitida)
- Dusky skate (Pavoraja umbrosa)
- Blotched sandskate (Psammobatis bergi)
- Zipper sandskate (Psammobatis extenta)
- Shortfin sandskate (Psammobatis normani)
- Smallthorn sandskate (Psammobatis rudis)
- Fanfin skate (Pseudoraja fischeri)
- Dapplebellied softnose skate (Rhinoraja kujiensis)
- Rhinoraja longicauda
- Oda skate (Rhinoraja odai)
- Filetail fanskate (Sympterygia lima)

==== Other Rajiformes species ====
- Blue-banded eagle ray (Aetomylaeus caeruleofasciatus)
- Leafnose legskate (Anacanthobatis folirostris)
- Black legskate (Anacanthobatis ori)
- Fenestraja plutonia
- Australian butterfly ray (Gymnura australis)
- California butterfly ray (Gymnura marmorata)
- Backwater butterfly ray (Gymnura natalensis)
- Sixgill stingray (Hexatrygon bickelli)
- Coffin ray (Hypnos monopterygius)
- Bat ray (Myliobatis californicus)
- New Zealand eagle ray (Myliobatis tenuicaudatus)
- Thornback guitarfish (Platyrhinoidis triseriata)
- Deepwater stingray (Plesiobatis daviesi)
- Largespot river stingray (Potamotrygon falkneri)
- Bigtooth river stingray (Potamotrygon henlei)
- Ocellate river stingray (Potamotrygon motoro)
- Potamotrygon orbignyi
- Borneo legskate (Sinobatis borneensis)
- Western legskate (Sinobatis bulbicauda)
- Blackbodied legskate (Sinobatis melanosoma)
- Pacific electric ray (Tetronarce californica)
- Atlantic torpedo (Tetronarce nobiliana)
- Longtail torpedo ray (Tetronarce tokionis)
- Chilean torpedo (Tetronarce tremens)
- Florida torpedo (Torpedo andersoni)
- Smalldisk torpedo (Torpedo microdiscus)
- Bullseye round stingray (Urobatis concentricus)
- Round stingray (Urobatis halleri)
- Yellow stingray (Urobatis jamaicensis)
- Spotted round ray (Urobatis maculatus)
- Smalleyed round stingray (Urotrygon microphthalmum)

=== Ground sharks ===
There are 79 ground shark species assessed as least concern.

==== Requiem sharks ====
- Nervous shark (Carcharhinus cautus)
- Creek whaler (Carcharhinus fitzroyensis)
- Galapagos shark (Carcharhinus galapagensis)
- Finetooth shark (Carcharhinus isodon)
- Australian blacktip shark (Carcharhinus tilstoni)
- Sliteye shark (Loxodon macrorhinus)
- Caribbean sharpnose shark (Rhizoprionodon porosus)
- Australian sharpnose shark (Rhizoprionodon taylori)
- Atlantic sharpnose shark (Rhizoprionodon terraenovae)

==== Houndsharks ====
- Whiskery shark (Furgaleus macki)
- Deepwater sicklefin houndshark (Hemitriakis abdita)
- Sicklefin houndshark (Hemitriakis falcata)
- Japanese topeshark (Hemitriakis japanica)
- Blacktip tope (Hypogaleus hyugaensis)
- Longnose houndshark (Iago garricki)
- Bigeye houndshark (Iago omanensis)
- White-margin fin smooth-hound (Mustelus albipinnis)
- Gummy shark (Mustelus antarcticus)
- Starry smooth-hound (Mustelus asterias)
- Grey smooth-hound (Mustelus californicus)
- Brown smooth-hound (Mustelus henlei)
- Smalleye smooth-hound (Mustelus higmani)
- Spotted estuary smooth-hound (Mustelus lenticulatus)
- Sicklefin smooth-hound (Mustelus lunulatus)
- Whitespotted smooth-hound (Mustelus palumbes)
- Australian grey smooth-hound (Mustelus ravidus)
- Gulf smooth-hound (Mustelus sinusmexicanus)
- Western spotted gummy shark (Mustelus stevensi)
- Sharptooth houndshark (Triakis megalopterus)
- Banded houndshark (Triakis scyllium)
- Leopard shark (Triakis semifasciata)

==== Catsharks ====
- White-bodied catshark (Apristurus albisoma)
- Roughskin catshark (Apristurus ampliceps)
- White ghost catshark (Apristurus aphyodes)
- Pinocchio catshark (Apristurus australis)
- Brown catshark (Apristurus brunneus)
- Hoary catshark (Apristurus canutus)
- Flaccid catshark (Apristurus exsanguis)
- Fedorov's catshark (Apristurus fedorovi)
- Humpback catshark (Apristurus gibbosus)
- Longfin catshark (Apristurus herklotsi)
- Smallbelly catshark (Apristurus indicus)
- Shortnose demon catshark (Apristurus internatus)
- Broadnose catshark (Apristurus investigatoris)
- Japanese catshark (Apristurus japonicus)
- Iceland catshark (Apristurus laurussonii)
- Longhead catshark (Apristurus longicephalus)
- Ghost catshark (Apristurus manis)
- Flathead catshark (Apristurus macrorhynchus)
- Broadmouth catshark (Apristurus macrostomus)
- Black roughscale catshark (Apristurus melanoasper)
- Smalleye catshark (Apristurus microps)
- Smalldorsal catshark (Apristurus micropterygeus)
- Largenose catshark (Apristurus nasutus)
- Smallfin catshark (Apristurus parvipinnis)
- Fat catshark (Apristurus pinguis)
- Spatulasnout catshark (Apristurus platyrhynchus)
- Deep-water catshark (Apristurus profundorum)
- Broadgill catshark (Apristurus riveri)
- Saldanha catshark (Apristurus saldanha)
- Pale catshark (Apristurus sibogae)
- Panama ghost catshark (Apristurus stenseni)
- Australian spotted catshark (Asymbolus analis)
- Starry catshark (Asymbolus galacticus)
- Western spotted catshark (Asymbolus occiduus)
- Pale spotted catshark (Asymbolus pallidus)
- Dwarf catshark (Asymbolus parvus)
- Orange-spotted catshark (Asymbolus rubiginosus)
- Variegated catshark (Asymbolus submaculatus)
- Gulf catshark (Asymbolus vincenti)
- Banded sand catshark (Atelomycterus fasciatus)
- Australian marbled catshark (Atelomycterus macleayi)
- Bali catshark (Atelimycterus baliensis)
- Australian blackspotted catshark (Aulohalaelurus labiosus)
- New Zealand catshark (Bythaelurus dawsoni)
- Spotless catshark (Bythaelurus immaculatus)
- Australian reticulate swellshark (Cephaloscyllium hiscosellum)
- Draughtsboard shark (Cephaloscyllium isabellum)
- Australian swellshark (Cephaloscyllium laticeps)
- Balloon shark (Cephaloscyllium sufflans)
- Swellshark (Cephaloscyllium ventriosum)
- Lollipop catshark (Cephalurus cephalus)
- Australian sawtail catshark (Figaro boardmani)
- Roughtail catshark (Galeus arae)
- Antilles catshark (Galeus antillensis)
- Longfin sawtail catshark (Galeus cadenati)
- Gecko catshark (Galeus eastmani)
- Longnose sawtail catshark (Galeus longirostris)
- Blackmouth catshark (Galeus melastomus)
- Mouse catshark (Galeus murinus)
- Broadfin sawtail catshark (Galeus nipponensis)
- Peppered catshark (Galeus piperatus)
- Phallic catshark (Galeus priapus)
- Blacktip sawtail catshark (Galeus sauteri)
- Dwarf sawtail catshark (Galeus schultzi)
- Springer's sawtail catshark (Galeus springeri)
- Lined catshark (Halaelurus lineatus)
- Indonesian speckled catshark (Halaelurus maculosus)
- Rusty catshark (Halaelurus sellus)
- Dark shyshark (Haploblepharus pictus)
- Crying Izak (Holohalaelurus melanostigma)
- Izak catshark (Holohalaelurus regani)
- White-tip catshark (Parmaturus albimarginatus)
- White-clasper catshark (Parmaturus albipenis)
- Campeche catshark (Parmaturus campechiensis)
- Velvet catshark (Parmaturus lanatus)
- Blackgill catshark (Parmaturus melanobranchus)
- Salamander shark (Parmaturus pilosus)
- Filetail catshark (Parmaturus xaniurus)
- Onefin catshark (Pentanchus profundicolus)
- Pyjama shark (Poroderma africanum)
- Leopard catshark (Poroderma pantherinum)
- Narrowmouthed catshark (Schroederichthys bivius)
- Redspotted catshark (Schroederichthys chilensis)
- Narrowtail catshark (Schroederichthys maculatus)
- Slender catshark (Schroederichthys tenuis)
- Boa catshark (Scyliorhinus boa)
- Small-spotted catshark (Scyliorhinus canicula)
- Whitesaddled catshark (Scyliorhinus hesperius)
- Blotched catshark (Scyliorhinus meadi)
- Chain catshark (Scyliorhinus retifer)
- Cloudy catshark (Scyliorhinus torazame)
- Dwarf catshark (Scyliorhinus torrei)

==== Other ground shark species ====
- Harlequin catshark (Ctenacis fehlmanni)
- Cuban ribbontail catshark (Eridacnis barbouri)
- Pygmy ribbontail catshark (Eridacnis radcliffei)
- African ribbontail catshark (Eridacnis sinuans)
- Slender smooth-hound (Gollum attenuatus)
- Australian weasel shark (Hemigaleus australiensis)
- False catshark (Pseudotriakis microdon)

=== Carpet sharks ===
- Blind shark (Brachaelurus waddi)
- Saddle carpetshark (Cirrhoscyllium japonicum)
- Tasselled wobbegong (Eucrossorhinus dasypogon)
- Epaulette shark (Hemiscyllium ocellatum)
- Speckled carpetshark (Hemiscyllium trispeculare)
- Floral banded wobbegong (Orectolobus floridus)
- Gulf wobbegong (Orectolobus halei)
- Western wobbegong (Orectolobus hutchinsi)
- Japanese wobbegong (Orectolobus japonicus)
- Spotted wobbegong (Orectolobus maculatus)
- Ornate wobbegong (Orectolobus ornatus)
- Dwarf spotted wobbegong (Orectolobus parvimaculatus)
- Network wobbegong (Orectolobus reticulatus)
- Northern wobbegong (Orectolobus wardi)
- Collared carpetshark (Parascyllium collare)
- Rusty carpetshark (Parascyllium ferrugineum)
- Necklace carpetshark (Parascyllium variolatum)
- Cobbler wobbegong (Sutorectus tentaculatus)

=== Squaliformes ===
There are 34 species and two subpopulations in the order Squaliformes assessed as least concern.

==== Oxynotids ====
- Caribbean roughshark (Oxynotus caribbaeus)

==== Centrophorids ====
Species

- Seychelles gulper shark (Centrophorus seychellorum)

Subpopulations

- Smallfin gulper shark (Centrophorus moluccensis) (1 subpopulation)

==== Squalids ====
Species

- Mandarin dogfish (Cirrhigaleus barbifer)
- Eastern highfin spurdog (Squalus albifrons)
- Fatspine spurdog (Squalus crassispinus)
- Cuban dogfish (Squalus cubensis)
- Northern spiny dogfish (Squalus griffini)
- Seychelles spurdog (Squalus lalannei)
- Shortnose spurdog (Squalus megalops)
- Blacktailed spurdog (Squalus melanurus)
- Bartail spurdog (Squalus notocaudatus)
- Kermadec spiny dogfish (Squalus raoulensis)
- North Pacific spiny dogfish (Squalus suckleyi)

==== Somniosids ====
- Roughskin dogfish (Centroscymnus owstonii)
- Longnose velvet dogfish (Centroselachus crepidater)
- Sparsetooth dogfish (Scymnodalatias oligodon)
- Southern sleeper shark (Somniosus antarcticus)
- Little sleeper shark (Somniosus rostratus)
- Velvet dogfish (Zameus squamulosus)

==== Dalatiids ====
- Pygmy shark (Euprotomicrus bispinatus)
- Taillight shark (Euprotomicroides zantedeschia)
- Longnose pygmy shark (Heteroscymnoides marleyi)
- Cookiecutter shark (Isistius brasiliensis)
- Largetooth cookiecutter shark (Isistius plutodus)
- Pocket shark (Mollisquama parini)
- Smalleye pygmy shark (Squaliolus aliae)
- Spined pygmy shark (Squaliolus laticaudus)

==== Etmopterids ====
- Black dogfish (Centroscyllium fabricii)
- Bareskin dogfish (Centroscyllium kamoharai)
- Combtooth dogfish (Centroscyllium nigrum)
- Ornate dogfish (Centroscyllium ornatum)
- Whitefin dogfish (Centroscyllium ritteri)
- New Zealand lanternshark (Etmopterus baxteri)
- Blurred lanternshark (Etmopterus bigelowi)
- Lined lanternshark (Etmopterus bullisi)
- Broad-snout lanternshark (Etmopterus burgessi)
- Cylindrical lanternshark (Etmopterus carteri)
- Tailspot lanternshark (Etmopterus caudistigmus)
- Combtooth lanternshark (Etmopterus decacuspidatus)
- Pink lanternshark (Etmopterus dianthus)
- Etmopterus dislineatus
- Blackmouth lanternshark (Etmopterus evansi)
- Pygmy lanternshark (Etmopterus fusus)
- Broadbanded lanternshark (Etmopterus gracilispinis)
- Southern lanternshark (Etmopterus granulosus)
- Caribbean lanternshark (Etmopterus hillianus)
- Smalleye lantern shark (Etmopterus litvinovi)
- Blackbelly lanternshark (Etmopterus lucifer)
- Dwarf lanternshark (Etmopterus perryi)
- African lanternshark (Etmopterus polli)
- Great lanternshark (Etmopterus princeps)
- False lanternshark (Etmopterus pseudosqualiolus)
- Smooth lanternshark (Etmopterus pusillus)
- Dense-scale lantern shark (Etmopterus pycnolepis)
- West Indian lanternshark (Etmopterus robinsi)
- Fringefin lanternshark (Etmopterus schultzi)
- Thorny lanternshark (Etmopterus sentosus)
- Velvet belly lanternshark (Etmopterus spinax)
- Splendid lanternshark (Etmopterus splendidus)
- Hawaiian lanternshark (Etmopterus villosus)
- Green lanternshark (Etmopterus virens)
- Rasptooth dogfish (Miroscyllium sheikoi)
- Viper dogfish (Trigonognathus kabeyai)

=== Chimaeras ===
There are 23 Chimaera species assessed as least concern.

==== Chimaerids ====
- Whitefin chimaera (Chimaera argiloba)
- Bahamas ghost shark (Chimaera bahamaensis)
- Cuban chimaera (Chimaera cubana)
- Southern chimaera (Chimaera fulva)
- Carpenter's chimaera (Chimaera lignaria)
- Longspine chimaera (Chimaera macrospina)
- Cape chimaera (Chimaera notafricana)
- Shortspine chimaera (Chimaera obscura)
- Leopard chimaera (Chimaera panthera)
- Small-eyed rabbitfish (Hydrolagus affinis)
- African chimaera (Hydrolagus africanus)
- Gulf chimaera (Hydrolagus alberti)
- Whitespot ghostshark (Hydrolagus alphus)
- Pale ghost shark (Hydrolagus bemisi)
- Spotted ratfish (Hydrolagus colliei)
- Black ghostshark (Hydrolagus homonycteris)
- Bight ghostshark (Hydrolagus lemures)
- Portuguese chimaera (Hydrolagus lusitanicus)
- Bigeye chimaera (Hydrolagus macrophthalmus)
- Marbled ghostshark (Hydrolagus marmoratus)
- Galapagos ghostshark (Hydrolagus mccoskeri)
- Eastern Pacific ghostshark (Hydrolagus melanophasma)
- Large-eyed rabbitfish (Hydrolagus mirabilis)
- Dark ghostshark (Hydrolagus novaezealandiae)
- Pale chimaera (Hydrolagus pallidus)
- Purple chimaera (Hydrolagus purpurescens)
- Pointy-nosed blue chimaera (Hydrolagus trolli)

==== Callorhinchids ====
- American elephantfish (Callorhinchus callorynchus)
- Cape elephantfish (Callorhinchus capensis)
- Australian ghostshark (Callorhinchus milii)

==== Rhinochimaerids ====
- Smallspine spookfish (Harriotta haeckeli)
- Narrownose chimaera (Harriotta raleighana)
- Arabian sicklefin chimaera (Neoharriotta pumila)
- Paddlenose chimaera (Rhinochimaera africana)
- Broadnose chimaera (Rhinochimaera atlantica)
- Pacific spookfish (Rhinochimaera pacifica)

=== Other cartilaginous fish species ===
- Frilled shark (Chlamydoselachus anguineus)
- Horn shark (Heterodontus francisci)
- Crested bullhead shark (Heterodontus galeatus)
- Japanese bullhead shark (Heterodontus japonicus)
- Mexican hornshark (Heterodontus mexicanus)
- Port Jackson shark (Heterodontus portusjacksoni)
- Galapagos bullhead shark (Heterodontus quoyi)
- Zebra bullhead shark (Heterodontus zebra)
- Salmon shark (Lamna ditropis)
- Bigeye sand tiger shark (Odontaspis noronhai)
- Megamouth shark (Megachasma pelagios)
- Goblin shark (Mitsukurina owstoni)
- Sixgill sawshark (Pliotrema warreni)
- Longnose sawshark (Pristiophorus cirratus)
- Tropical sawshark (Pristiophorus delicatus)
- Japanese sawshark (Pristiophorus japonicus)
- Shortnose sawshark (Pristiophorus nudipinnis)
- Bahamas sawshark (Pristiophorus schroederi)
- Crocodile shark (Pseudocarcharias kamoharai)
- Australian angelshark (Squatina australis)
- Western angelshark (Squatina pseudocellata)
- Ornate angelshark (Squatina tergocellata)

== Lampreys ==
- Caspian lamprey (Caspiomyzon wagneri)
- Pit-klamath brook lamprey (Entosphenus lethophagus)
- Carpathian brook lamprey (Eudontomyzon danfordi)
- Ukrainian brook lamprey (Eudontomyzon mariae)
- Vladykov's lamprey (Eudontomyzon vladykovi)
- Ohio lamprey (Ichthyomyzon bdellium)
- Chestnut lamprey (Ichthyomyzon castaneus)
- Northern brook lamprey (Ichthyomyzon fossor)
- Southern brook lamprey (Ichthyomyzon gagei)
- Mountain brook lamprey (Ichthyomyzon greeleyi)
- Silver lamprey (Ichthyomyzon unicuspis)
- Least brook lamprey (Lampetra aepyptera)
- Western river lamprey (Lampetra ayresii)
- Western brook lamprey (Lampetra richardsoni)
- American brook lamprey (Lethenteron appendix)
- Arctic lamprey (Lethenteron camtschaticum)
- Far Eastern brook lamprey (Lethenteron reissneri)
- Sea lamprey (Petromyzon marinus)

== Ray-finned fishes ==
There are 8759 species, 34 subspecies, and one subpopulation of ray-finned fish assessed as least concern.

=== Salmoniformes ===
Species

- Coregonus albula
- Coregonus alpinus
- Cisco (Coregonus artedi)
- Arctic cisco (Coregonus autumnalis)
- Coregonus fatioi
- Coregonus ladogae
- Coregonus lutokka
- Coregonus macrophthalmus
- Coregonus maxillaris
- Coregonus megalops
- Muksun (Coregonus muksun)
- Broad whitefish (Coregonus nasus)
- Coregonus nilssoni
- Coregonus nobilis
- Coregonus palaea
- Coregonus pallasii
- Peled (Coregonus peled)
- Humpback whitefish (Coregonus pidschian)
- Least cisco (Coregonus sardinella)
- Coregonus suidteri
- Coregonus wartmanni
- Coregonus zuerichensis
- Coregonus zugensis
- Sockeye salmon (Oncorhynchus nerka)
- Black Sea salmon (Salmo labrax)
- Salmo macedonicus
- Salmo marmoratus
- Atlantic salmon (Salmo salar)
- Brown trout (Salmo trutta)
- Arctic char (Salvelinus alpinus)
- Boganida char (Salvelinus boganidae)
- Salvelinus lepechini
- Salvelinus murta
- Salvelinus thingvallensis
- Salvelinus umbla
- Nelma (Stenodus nelma)
- Arctic grayling (Thymallus arcticus)
- Grayling (Thymallus thymallus)

Subpopulations

- Sockeye salmon (Oncorhynchus nerka) (41 subpopulations)

=== Silversides ===
There are 47 silverside species assessed as least concern.

==== Atherinidae ====
- Big-scale sand smelt (Atherina boyeri)
- Sand smelt (Atherina presbyter)
- Hardhead silverside (Atherinomorus stipes)
- Bearded silverside (Atherion elymus)
- Bulolo rainbowfish (Chilatherina bulolo)
- Kailola's hardyhead (Craterocephalus kailolae)
- Prince Regent hardyhead (Craterocephalus lentiginosus)
- Magela hardyhead (Craterocephalus marianae)
- Reef silverside (Hypoatherina harringtonensis)
- Short-snout hardyhead (Kestratherina brevirostris)
- Vily (Teramulus kieneri)

==== Melanotaeniidae ====
- Axelrod's rainbowfish (Chilatherina axelrodi)
- Spotted rainbowfish (Glossolepis maculosus)
- Rosy rainbowfish (Glossolepis multisquamata)
- Yakati rainbowfish (Melanotaenia angfa)
- Waigeo rainbowfish (Melanotaenia catherinae)
- Exquisite rainbowfish (Melanotaenia exquisita)
- Strickland rainbowfish (Melanotaenia iris)
- Mayland's rainbowfish (Melanotaenia maylandi)
- Misool rainbowfish (Melanotaenia misoolensis)
- Pima River rainbowfish (Melanotaenia pimaensis)
- Dwarf rainbowfish (Melanotaenia praecox)
- Van Heurn's rainbowfish (Melanotaenia vanheurni)

==== Neotropical silversides ====
- Moon silverside (Atherinella argentea)
- Beach silverside (Atherinella blackburni)
- Robust silverside (Atherinella brasiliensis)
- Blackfin silverside (Atherinella crystallina)
- Longfin silverside (Atherinella eriarcha)
- Guatemala silverside (Atherinella guatemalensis)
- Miller's silverside (Atherinella milleri)
- Pitcher silverside(Atherinella nepenthe)
- Atherinella nocturna
- Thickscale silverside (Atherinella pachylepis)
- Panama silverside (Atherinella panamensis)
- Bright silverside (Atherinella serrivomer)
- Star silverside (Atherinella starksi)
- Topsmelt silverside (Atherinops affinis)
- Jack silverside (Atherinopsis californiensis)
- Basilichthys semotilus
- Brook silverside (Labidesthes sicculus)
- Blackside silverside (Melanorhinus cyanellus)
- Querimana silverside (Melanorhinus microps)
- Landia silverside (Membras gilberti)
- Rough silverside (Membras martinica)
- Menidia audens
- Inland silverside (Menidia beryllina)
- Atlantic silverside (Menidia menidia)
- Menidia peninsulae
- Odontesthes incisa
- Chilean silverside (Odontesthes regia)

==== Other silverside species ====
- Neostethus bicornis
- Smith's priapium fish (Phenacostethus smithi)

=== Toothcarps ===
There are 206 species and two subspecies of toothcarp assessed as least concern.

==== Aphanids ====
- Almiri killifish (Aphanius almiriensis)
- Scaleless killifish (Aphanius asquamatus)
- Dislisazancik baligi (Aphanius chantrei)
- Mediterranean killifish (Aphanius desioi)
- Arabian toothcarp (Aphanius dispar)
- Mediterranean killifish (Aphanius fasciatus)
- Iridescent toothcarp (Aphanius mento)
- Sakarya toothcarp (Aphanius villwocki)

==== Goodeids ====
- Green goodea (Goodea atripinnis)
- Lennon's ilyodon (Ilyodon lennoni)

==== Pupfish species ====
- Yucatan pupfish (Cyprinodon artifrons)
- Bolson pupfish (Cyprinodon atrorus)
- Cuatro Cienegas pupfish (Cyprinodon bifasciatus)
- Cachorrito del aguanaval (Cyprinodon nazas)
- Red River pupfish (Cyprinodon rubrofluviatilis)
- Sheepshead pupfish (Cyprinodon variegatus)
- Goldspotted killifish (Floridichthys carpio)
- Ocellated killifish (Floridichthys polyommus)

==== Aplocheilids ====
- Green panchax (Aplocheilus blockii)
- Striped panchax (Aplocheilus lineatus)
- Blue panchax (Aplocheilus panchax)
- Pachypanchax omalonota

==== Rivulids ====
- Anablepsoides christinae
- Anablepsoides iridescens
- Anablepsoides lungi
- Anablepsoides ophiomimus
- Anablepsoides rubrolineatus
- Aphyolebias rubrocaudatus
- Cynodonichthys magdalenae
- Cynodonichthys wassmanni
- Mangrove rivulus (Kryptolebias marmoratus)
- Melanorivulus apiamici
- Moema ortegai
- Brown rivulus (Rivulus cylindraceus)
- Trigonectes rogoaguae

==== Nothobranchiids ====
Species

- Aphyosemion ahli
- Lyretail panchax (Aphyosemion australe)
- Bates' killi (Aphyosemion batesii)
- Two-stripped aphyosemion (Aphyosemion bitaeniatum)
- Aphyosemion buytaerti
- Aphyosemion callipteron
- Banner lyretail (Aphyosemion calliurum)
- Cameroon killi (Aphyosemion cameronense)
- Aphyosemion castaneum
- Celia's aphysemion (Aphyosemion celiae)
- Christy's lyretail (Aphyosemion christyi)
- Lemon-finned killi (Aphyosemion citrineipinnis)
- Redspot panchax (Aphyosemion cognatum)
- Gabon jewelfish (Aphyosemion cyanostictum)
- Red barred killi (Aphyosemion elberti)
- Elegant killi (Aphyosemion elegans)
- Escherich's killi (Aphyosemion escherichi)
- False jewel killi (Aphyosemion exigoideum)
- Jewel killi (Aphyosemion exiguum)
- Aphyosemion ferranti
- Aphyosemion georgiae
- Hannelore's killi (Aphyosemion hanneloreae)
- Herzog's killi (Aphyosemion herzogi)
- Hofmann's killi (Aphyosemion hofmanni)
- Aphyosemion joergenscheeli
- Aphyosemion labarrei
- Aphyosemion lamberti
- Aphyosemion loennbergii
- Aphyosemion lujae
- Aphyosemion maculatum
- Aphyosemion mimbon
- Aphyosemion ocellatum
- Aphyosemion polli
- Aphyosemion punctatum
- Aphyosemion raddai
- Aphyosemion riggenbachi
- Aphyosemion schioetzi
- Aphyosemion splendopleure
- Aphyosemion striatum
- Guinean killifish (Archiaphyosemion guineense)
- Callopanchax occidentalis
- Clown killi (Epiplatys annulatus)
- Epiplatys ansorgii
- Epiplatys barmoiensis
- Epiplatys bifasciatus
- Epiplatys chevalieri
- Redchin panchax (Epiplatys dageti)
- Dubois' panchax (Epiplatys duboisi)
- Epiplatys esekanus
- Epiplatys fasciolatus
- Epiplatys grahami
- Epiplatys huberi
- Epiplatys infrafasciatus
- Epiplatys maeseni
- Epiplatys mesogramma
- Epiplatys neumanni
- Epiplatys olbrechtsi
- Epiplatys phoeniceps
- Epiplatys sangmelinensis
- Six-barred epiplatys (Epiplatys sexfasciatus)
- Epiplatys singa
- Epiplatys spilargyreius
- Epiplatys togolensis
- Starhead killi (Fenerbahce formosus)
- Foerschichthys flavipinnis
- Fundulopanchax kamdemi
- Fundulopanchax puerzli
- Blue gularis (Fundulopanchax sjostedti)
- Nothobranchius brieni
- Nothobranchius eggersi
- Turquoise killifish (Nothobranchius furzeri)
- Redtail notho (Nothobranchius guentheri)
- Nothobranchius janpapi
- Nothobranchius jubbi
- Caprivi killifish (Nothobranchius kafuensis)
- Kirk's killifish (Nothobranchius kirki)
- Blackspotted nothobranch (Nothobranchius melanospilus)
- Small scaled nothobranch (Nothobranchius microlepis)
- Nothobranchius neumanni
- Spotted killifish (Nothobranchius orthonotus)
- Nothobranchius palmqvisti
- Blue notho (Nothobranchius patrizii)
- Rainbow kilifish (Nothobranchius rachovii)
- Red Victoria nothobranch (Nothobranchius robustus)
- Striped nothobranch (Nothobranchius taeniopygus)
- Togo killifish (Nothobranchius thierryi)
- Uganda nothobranch (Nothobranchius ugandensis)
- Gérys killi (Scriptaphyosemion geryi)
- Scriptaphyosemion guignardi

Subspecies

- Aphyosemion cameronense halleri
- Dusky panchax (Epiplatys chevalieri nigricans)

==== Poeciliids ====
- Aplocheilichthys antinorii
- Brichard's lampeye (Aplocheilichthys brichardi)
- Bukoba lampeye (Aplocheilichthys bukobanus)
- Central East African lampeye (Aplocheilichthys centralis)
- Lake Rukwa lampeye (Aplocheilichthys fuelleborni)
- Meshscaled topminnow (Aplocheilichthys hutereaui)
- Aplocheilichthys jeanneli
- Johnston's topminnow (Aplocheilichthys johnstoni)
- Striped topminnow (Aplocheilichthys katangae)
- Aplocheilichthys kingii
- Kongoro lampeye (Aplocheilichthys kongoranensis)
- Big tailed lampeye (Aplocheilichthys macrurus)
- Spotted lampeye (Aplocheilichthys maculatus)
- Aplocheilichthys mediolateralis
- Natal topminnow (Aplocheilichthys myaposae)
- Aplocheilichthys pumilus
- Lake Rudolf lampeye (Aplocheilichthys rudolfianus)
- Banded lampeye (Aplocheilichthys spilauchen)
- Bitschumbi lampeye (Aplocheilichthys vitschumbaensis)
- Mosquitofish (Gambusia affinis)
- Largespring gambusia (Gambusia geiseri)
- Eastern mosquitofish (Gambusia holbrooki)
- Mangrove gambusia (Gambusia rhizophorae)
- Tex-Mex gambusia (Gambusia speciosa)
- Gulf gambusia (Gambusia vittata)
- Least killifish (Heterandria formosa)
- Blue lampeye (Hylopanchax stictopleuron)
- Hypsopanchax jobaerti
- Southern deepbody (Hypsopanchax jubbi)
- Ruwenzori lampeye (Hypsopanchax modestus)
- Zaire lampeye (Hypsopanchax platysternus)
- Zebra lampeye (Hypsopanchax zebra)
- Laciris pelagicus
- Lualaba lampeye (Lacustricola lualabaensis)
- Saisi lampeye (Lacustricola matthesi)
- Moero lampeye (Lacustricola moeruensis)
- Tanganyika killifish (Lamprichthys tanganicanus)
- Cameroon lampeye (Micropanchax camerunensis)
- Nile jewel cichlid (Micropanchax loati)
- Scheel's lampeye (Micropanchax scheeli)
- Nga lampeye (Plataplochilus ngaensis)
- Amazon molly (Poecilia formosa)
- Poecilia koperi
- Sailfin molly (Poecilia latipinna)
- Mangrove molly (Poecilia orri)
- Blackstripe livebearer (Poeciliopsis prolifica)
- Barred livebearer (Poeciliopsis turrubarensis)
- Emerald green lampeye (Poropanchax luxophthalmus)
- Norman's lampeye (Poropanchax normani)
- Poropanchax rancureli
- Poropanchax stigmatopygus
- Isthmian priapella (Priapella intermedia)
- Priapichthys chocoensis
- Bluegreen lampeye (Procatopus aberrans)
- Procatopus cabindae
- Loeme lampeye (Procatopus loemensis)
- Large finned lampeye (Procatopus nototaenia)
- Variable lampeye (Procatopus similis)
- Pseudopoecilia fria
- Rhexipanchax schioetzi

==== Fundulids ====
- Lowland topminnow (Fundulus blairae)
- Northern studfish (Fundulus catenatus)
- Golden topminnow (Fundulus chrysotus)
- Banded topminnow (Fundulus cingulatus)
- Marsh killifish (Fundulus confluentus)
- Banded killifish (Fundulus diaphanus)
- Starhead topminnow (Fundulus dispar)
- Russetfin topminnow (Fundulus escambiae)
- Gulf killifish (Fundulus grandis)
- Mummichog (Fundulus heteroclitus)
- Northern plains killifish (Fundulus kansae)
- Baja California killifish (Fundulus lima)
- Lined topminnow (Fundulus lineolatus)
- Spotfin killifish (Fundulus luciae)
- Striped killifish (Fundulus majalis)
- Blackstripe topminnow (Fundulus notatus)
- Fundulus nottii
- Blackspotted topminnow (Fundulus olivaceus)
- Bayou killifish (Fundulus pulvereus)
- Speckled killifish (Fundulus rathbuni)
- Redface topminnow (Fundulus rubrifrons)
- Plains topminnow (Fundulus sciadicus)
- Seminole killifish (Fundulus seminolis)
- Longnose killifish (Fundulus similis)
- Southern studfish (Fundulus stellifer)
- Diamond killifish (Fundulus xenica)
- Plains killifish (Fundulus zebrinus)
- Pygmy killifish (Leptolucania ommata)
- Bluefin killifish (Lucania goodei)
- Rainwater killifish (Lucania parva)

=== Cypriniformes ===
Cypriniformes includes carps, minnows, loaches and relatives. There are 1231 species and three subspecies in the order Cypriniformes assessed as least concern.

==== Hillstream loaches ====
- Aborichthys elongatus
- Mottled loach (Acanthocobitis botia)
- Acanthocobitis rubidipinnis
- Acanthocobitis zonalternans
- Annamia normani
- Balitora annamitica
- Burmese stone loach (Balitora burmanica)
- Balitora eddsi
- Balitora kwangsiensis
- Balitora lancangjiangensis
- Balitora longibarbata
- Barbatula altayensis
- Stone loach (Barbatula barbatula)
- Barbatula quignardi
- Barbatula sturanyi
- Barbatula zetensis
- Fire-eyed loach (Barbucca diabolica)
- Beaufortia cyclica
- Beaufortia pingi
- Beaufortia polylepis
- Western ghats loach (Bhavania australis)
- Formosania tinkhami
- Gastromyzon lepidogaster
- Hemimyzon macroptera
- Hemimyzon papilio
- Homaloptera leonardi
- Homaloptera manipurensis
- Homaloptera menoni
- Silent Valley loach (Homaloptera pillaii)
- Homaloptera rupicola
- Homaloptera smithi
- Homaloptera yunnanensis
- Black lizard loach (Homaloptera zollingeri)
- Indoreonectes evezardi
- Lepturichthys fimbriata
- Devi's loach (Mesonoemacheilus remadevii)
- Micronemacheilus pulcher
- Micronemacheilus taeniatus
- Nemacheilus anguilla
- Nemacheilus arenicolus
- Nemacheilus cleopatra
- Nemacheilus denisoni
- Gunther's loach (Nemacheilus guentheri)
- Nemacheilus longistriatus
- Nemacheilus monilis
- Nemacheilus mooreh
- Nemacheilus nilgiriensis
- Nemacheilus pallidus
- Nemachilichthys rueppelli (Nemacheilus rueppelli)
- Dotted loach (Nemacheilus semiarmatus)
- Zodiac loach (Nemacheilus triangularis)
- Neonoemacheilus labeosus
- Angora loach (Oxynoemacheilus angorae)
- Two spot loach (Oxynoemacheilus argyrogramma)
- Kura sportive loach (Oxynoemacheilus bergianus)
- Kura loach (Oxynoemacheilus brandtii)
- Oxynoemacheilus bureschi
- Banded Kura loach (Oxynoemacheilus cyri)
- Ceyhan sportive loach (Oxynoemacheilus evreni)
- Tigris loach (Oxynoemacheilus frenatus)
- Melid loach (Oxynoemacheilus kaynaki)
- Paphlagonian loach (Oxynoemacheilus kosswigi)
- Lebanese loach (Oxynoemacheilus leontinae)
- Pamphylian loach (Oxynoemacheilus mediterraneus)
- Oxynoemacheilus merga
- Levantine loach (Oxynoemacheilus namiri)
- Kizilirmak sportive loach (Oxynoemacheilus samanticus)
- Oxynoemacheilus theophilii
- Physoschistura pseudobrunneana
- Protomyzon pachychilus
- Pseudogastromyzon fangi
- Pseudogastromyzon myersi
- Schistura athos
- Creek loach (Schistura beavani)
- Schistura bucculenta
- Schistura carbonaria
- Schistura cataracta
- Schistura caudofurca
- Schistura clatrata
- Schistura corica
- Schistura daubentoni
- Schistura dayi
- Schistura desmotes
- Schistura dorsizona
- Schistura fusinotata
- Schistura geisleri
- Schistura hingi
- Schistura imitator
- Schistura isostigma
- Schistura kengtungensis
- Schistura kongphengi
- Schistura magnifluvis
- Schistura mahnerti
- Schistura malaisei
- Schistura melarancia
- Schistura multifasciata
- Schistura namboensis
- Schistura nicholsi
- Schistura nomi
- Schistura obeini
- Schistura pervagata
- Schistura poculi
- Schistura porthos
- Schistura procera
- Schistura reidi
- Schistura robertsi
- Schistura rupecula
- Schistura savona
- Schistura scaturigina
- Schistura sexcauda
- Schistura sikmaiensis
- Schistura sombooni
- Schistura subfusca
- Schistura tirapensis
- Schistura udomritthiruji
- Schistura vinciguerrae
- Sewellia speciosa
- Sinogastromyzon sichangensis
- Sinogastromyzon szechuanensis
- Sinogastromyzon wui
- Triplophysa dalaica
- Triplophysa intermedia
- Triplophysa microps
- Triplophysa moquensis
- Triplophysa obtusirostra
- Triplophysa orientalis
- Triplophysa stenura
- Triplophysa stewarti
- Triplophysa tibetana
- Triplophysa turpanensis
- Triplophysa xichangensis
- Tuberoschistura baenzigeri
- Tuberoschistura cambodgiensis
- Zagroz dwarf loach (Turcinoemacheilus kosswigi)
- Vanmanenia pingchowensis
- Vietnamese multi banded zebra loach (Yunnanilus cruciatus)
- Yunnanilus pachycephalus

==== True loaches ====
- Horseface loach (Acantopsis choirorhynchos)
- Horse-faced loach (Acantopsis dialuzona)
- Aperioptus delphax
- Aperioptus gracilentus
- Aperioptus gracilis
- Aperioptus hapalias
- Aperioptus molobrion
- Yoyo loach (Botia almorhae)
- Botia dario
- Botia histrionica
- Canthophrys gongota
- Cobitis bilineata
- Euphrates spined loach (Cobitis elazigensis)
- Balkan loach (Cobitis elongata)
- Cobitis elongatoides
- Aegean spined loach (Cobitis fahireae)
- Cobitis kurui
- Spiny loach (Cobitis laoensis)
- Cobitis melanoleuca
- Cobitis ohridana
- Cobitis pontica
- Colchic spined loach (Cobitis satunini)
- Galatian spined loach (Cobitis simplicispina)
- Cobitis sinensis
- Struma spined loach (Cobitis strumicae)
- Spined loach (Cobitis taenia)
- Don spined loach (Cobitis tanaitica)
- Cobitis vardarensis
- Lepidocephalichthys annandalei
- Lepidocephalichthys berdmorei
- Lepidocephalichthys coromandelensis
- Lepidocephalichthys furcatus
- Lepidocephalichthys goalparensis
- Lepidocephalichthys guntea
- Lepidocephalichthys hasselti
- Loktak loach (Lepidocephalichthys irrorata)
- Lepidocephalichthys manipurensis
- Lepidocephalichthys micropogon
- Peppered loach (Lepidocephalus guntea)
- Lepidocephalus thermalis
- Leptobotia guilinensis
- Leptobotia pellegrini
- Pond loach (Misgurnus anguillicaudatus)
- Weatherfish (Misgurnus fossilis)
- Neoeucirrhichthys maydelli
- Pangio cuneovirgata
- Pangio filinaris
- Indian coolie-loach (Pangio goaensis)
- Pangio myersi
- Pangio pangia
- Pangio semicincta
- Parabotia fasciata
- Parabotia maculosa
- Golden spined loach (Sabanejewia aurata)
- Sabanejewia balcanica
- Sabanejewia baltica
- Sabanejewia bulgarica
- Sabanejewia caucasica
- Sabanejewia kubanica
- Italian loach (Sabanejewia larvata)
- Banded tiger loach (Syncrossus helodes)
- Yasuhikotakia caudipunctata
- Sun loach (Yasuhikotakia eos)
- Red-finned loach (Yasuhikotakia lecontei)
- Blue botia (Yasuhikotakia modesta)
- Skunk loach (Yasuhikotakia morleti)

==== Cyprinids ====
Species

- Common bream (Abramis brama)
- Mesopotamian bream (Acanthobrama marmid)
- Caucasian bream (Acanthobrama microlepis)
- Acapoeta tanganicae
- Kinesisk bitterling (Acheilognathus barbatulus)
- Acheilognathus melanogaster
- Acheilognathus taenianalis
- Ruivaco (Achondrostoma oligolepis)
- Chiselmouth (Acrocheilus alutaceus)
- Acrossocheilus beijiangensis
- Acrossocheilus hemispinus
- Acrossocheilus parallens
- Acrossocheilus yunnanensis
- Longfin dace (Agosia chrysogaster)
- Albulichthys albuloides
- South Caspian sprilin (Alburnoides eichwaldii)
- Transcaucasian sprilin (Alburnoides fasciatus)
- Dagestan spirlin (Alburnoides gmelini)
- Kuban spirlin (Alburnoides kubanicus)
- Manyas sprilin (Alburnoides manyasensis)
- Russian spirlin (Alburnoides rossicus)
- Common bleak (Alburnus alburnus)
- Alburnus arborella
- Black spotted bleak (Alburnus caeruleus)
- Danube bleak (Alburnus chalcoides)
- Georgian shemaya (Alburnus derjugini)
- Sakarya bleak (Alburnus escherichii)
- Kura bleak (Alburnus filippii)
- Hazer Shah kuli (Alburnus heckeli)
- Alburnus hohenackeri
- Alburnus istanbulensis
- İskenderun shah kuli (Alburnus kotschyi)
- Azov shemaya (Alburnus leobergi)
- Alburnus mento
- Neretva bleak (Alburnus neretvae)
- Alburnus scoranza
- Shah kuli (Alburnus sellal)
- Alburnus thessalicus
- Amblypharyngodon atkinsonii
- Amblypharyngodon chulabhornae
- Silver carplet (Amblypharyngodon melettinus)
- Indian carplet (Amblypharyngodon microlepis)
- Amblypharyngodon mola
- Amblyrhynchichthys micracanthus
- Chinese bleak (Aphyocypris chinensis)
- Arabian shabout (Arabibarbus arabicus)
- Aspidoparia jaya
- Asp (Aspius aspius)
- Atrilinea roulei
- Blue bream (Ballerus ballerus)
- White-eye bream (Ballerus sapa)
- Ariza labeo (Bangana ariza)
- Kalabans (Bangana dero)
- Bangana devdevi
- Bangana diplostoma
- Sucker barb (Barbichthys laevis)
- Barbodes aurotaeniatus
- Spotted barb (Barbodes binotatus)
- Carnatic carp (Barbodes carnaticus)
- Spanner barb (Barbodes lateristriga)
- Barbodes rhombeus
- Gold barb (Barbodes semifasciolatus)
- Red tailed tinfoil (Barbonymus altus)
- Java barb (Barbonymus gonionotus)
- Tinfoil barb (Barbonymus schwanenfeldii)
- Barbus ablabes
- Hamilton's barb (Barbus afrohamiltoni)
- Spottail barb (Barbus afrovernayi)
- Ripon barbel (Barbus altianalis)
- Barbus amanpoae
- Barbus anema
- Broadstriped barb (Barbus annectens)
- Chubbyhead barb (Barbus anoplus)
- Barbus ansorgii
- East African red-finned barb (Barbus apleurogramma)
- Barbus arcislongae
- Rosefin barb (Barbus argenteus)
- Barbus aspilus
- Barbus atakorensis
- Dash-dot barb (Barbus atkinsoni)
- Barbus atromaculatus
- Barbus balcanicus
- Common barbel (Barbus barbus)
- Barbus bernardi (Barbus barnardi)
- Barotse barb (Barbus barotseensis)
- Barbus baudoni
- Barbus bergi
- Hyphen barb (Barbus bifrenatus)
- Barbus brazzai
- Shorthead barb (Barbus breviceps)
- Barbus brevidorsalis
- Barbus brichardi
- Barbus bynni
- Barbus callensis
- Clipper barb (Barbus callipterus)
- African redfinned barb (Barbus camptacanthus)
- Barbus candens
- Barbus carens
- Barbus carpathicus
- Barbus chicapaensis
- Barbus chiumbeensis
- Barbus chlorotaenia
- Barbus ciscaucasicus
- Barbus crocodilensis
- Barbus cyclolepis
- Barbus diamouanganai
- Topstripe barb (Barbus dorsolineatus)
- Barbus ensis
- Sakarya barbel (Barbus escherichii)
- Barbus evansi
- African banded barb (Barbus fasciolatus)
- Barbus fasolt
- Barbus fritschii
- Barbus guirali
- Redtail barb (Barbus gurneyi)
- Sickle barb (Barbus haasianus)
- Spotscale barb (Barbus holotaenia)
- Namaquab barb (Barbus hospes)
- Butterfly barb (Barbus hulstaerti)
- Barbus humeralis
- Barbus hypsolepis
- Inconspicuous barb (Barbus innocens)
- Barbus intermedius
- Jackson's barb (Barbus jacksoni)
- Jae barb (Barbus jae)
- Barbus janssensi
- Barbus johnstonii
- Barbus kamaia
- Barbus kamolondoensis
- Redspot barb (Barbus kerstenii)
- Gillbar barb (Barbus kessleri)
- Barbus kubanicus
- Barbus labiosa
- Lizard barbel (Barbus lacerta)
- Barbus leonensis
- Barbus lepineyi
- Line-spotted barb (Barbus lineomaculatus)
- Barbus litamba
- Barbus luapulae
- Luika barb (Barbus luikae)
- Barbus lukusiensis
- Barbus luluae
- Barbus macinensis
- Blackstripe barb (Barbus macrops)
- Broadband bard (Barbus macrotaenia)
- Bunjako barb (Barbus magdalenae)
- Barbus magniatlantis
- Yellow barb (Barbus manicensis)
- Barbus marmoratus
- Barbus martorelli
- Barbus massaensis
- Barbus matthesi
- Papermouth (Barbus mattozi)
- Barbus mawambiensis
- Ewaso Nyiro barb (Barbus mimus)
- Zigzag barb (Barbus miolepis)
- Barbus moulouyensis
- Copperstripe barb (Barbus multilineatus)
- Barbus musumbi
- Sidespot barb (Barbus neefi)
- Barbus neglectus
- Neumayer's barb (Barbus neumayeri)
- Barbus nigeriensis
- Barbus nounensis
- Nyanza barb (Barbus nyanzae)
- Barbus oligogrammus
- Marmara barbel (Barbus oligolepis)
- Olivegreen ufipa barb (Barbus olivaceus)
- Pangani barb (Barbus oxyrhynchus)
- Barbus pallaryi
- Goldie barb (Barbus pallidus)
- Straightfin barb (Barbus paludinosus)
- Barbus parablabes
- Barbus parajae
- Pellegrin's barb (Barbus pellegrini)
- Barbus peloponnesius
- Barbus pergamonensis
- Barbus perince
- Romanian barbel (Barbus petenyi)
- Italian barbel (Barbus plebejus)
- Barbus pobeguini
- Dashtail barb (Barbus poechii)
- Briána (Barbus prespensis)
- Barbus prionacanthus
- Barbus punctitaeniatus
- Redeye barb (Barbus radiatus)
- Southern papermouth (Barbus rapax)
- Western Balkan barbel (Barbus rebeli)
- Barbus rubrostigma
- Barbus sacratus
- Barbus setivimensis
- Barbus somereni
- Barbus stanleyi
- Barbus stappersii
- Midspot barb (Barbus stigmatopygus)
- Barbus strumicae
- Barbus sublineatus
- Barbus taeniopleura
- Barbus tanapelagius
- Thamalakane barb (Barbus thamalakanensis)
- East coast barb (Barbus toppini)
- Barbus trachypterus
- Threespot barb (Barbus trimaculatus)
- Barbus trinotatus
- Barbus trispilomimus
- Barbus trispilopleura
- Barbus trispilos
- Barbus tropidolepis
- Lake Turkana barb (Barbus turkanae)
- Slender barb (Barbus unitaeniatus)
- Barbus urostigma
- Barbus usambarae
- Bowstripe barb (Barbus viviparus)
- Vistula barbel (Barbus waleckii)
- Barbus wurtzi
- Nzoia barb (Barbus yongei)
- Zanzibar barb (Barbus zanzibaricus)
- Barilius bakeri
- Barilius barila
- Barna baril (Barilius barna)
- Barilius bendelisis
- Barilius gatensis
- Mesopotamian barilius (Barilius mesopotamicus)
- Barilius shacra
- Barilius tileo
- Barilius vagra
- Blicca bjoerkna
- Dwarf rasbora (Boraras maculatus)
- Three-spotted dwarf minnow (Boraras micros)
- Morar (Cabdio morar)
- Central stoneroller (Campostoma anomalum)
- Largescale stoneroller (Campostoma oligolepis)
- Mexican stoneroller (Campostoma ornatum)
- Bluefin stoneroller (Campostoma pauciradii)
- Highland stoneroller (Campostoma spadiceum)
- Fourbarbel scraper (Capoeta baliki)
- Colchic scraper (Capoeta banarescui)
- Namak scraper (Capoeta buhsei)
- Taurus scraper (Capoeta caelestis)
- Caucasian scraper (Capoeta capoeta)
- Levantine scraper (Capoeta damascina)
- Ceyhan scraper (Capoeta erhani)
- Nipple-lip scraper (Capoeta sieboldii)
- Western fourbarbel scraper (Capoeta tinca)
- Longspine scraper (Capoeta trutta)
- Tigirs scraper (Capoeta umbla)
- Mesopotamian himri (Carasobarbus luteus)
- Carassioides acuminatus
- Carassius auratus
- Crucian carp (Carassius carassius)
- Chagunius chagunio
- Chagunius nicholsi
- Humpback (Chanodichthys dabryi)
- Predatory carp (Chanodichthys erythropterus)
- Mongolian redfin (Chanodichthys mongolicus)
- Silver hatchet chela (Chela cachius)
- Turkana sardine (Chelaethiops bibie)
- Chelaethiops congicus
- Chelaethiops elongatus
- Chelaethiops minutus
- Black sea nase (Chondrostoma angorense)
- Colchic nase (Chondrostoma colchicum)
- Kura nase (Chondrostoma cyri)
- Kuban's nase (Chondrostoma kubanicum)
- Common nase (Chondrostoma nasus)
- Terek nase (Chondrostoma oxyrhynchum)
- Mesopotamian nase (Chondrostoma regium)
- Volga undermouth (Chondrostoma variabile)
- Northern redbelly dace (Chrosomus eos)
- Southern redbelly dace (Chrosomus erythrogaster)
- Finescale dace (Chrosomus neogaeus)
- Mountain redbelly dace (Chrosomus oreas)
- Deccan white carp (Cirrhinus fulungee)
- Cirrhinus mrigala
- Reba carp (Cirrhinus reba)
- Redside dace (Clinostomus elongatus)
- Rosyside dace (Clinostomus funduloides)
- Congo barb (Clypeobarbus congicus)
- Clypeobarbus pleuropholis
- Upjaw barb (Coptostomabarbus wittei)
- Cosmochilus harmandi
- Lake chub (Couesius plumbeus)
- Crossocheilus atrilimes
- Burmese latia (Crossocheilus burmanicus)
- Gangetic latia (Crossocheilus latius)
- Siamese algae eater (Crossocheilus oblongus)
- Crossocheilus reticulatus
- Culter recurviceps
- Beardless barb (Cyclocheilichthys apogon)
- Cyclocheilichthys armatus
- Cyclocheilichthys enoplos
- Mekong giant barb (Cyclocheilichthys furcatus)
- Cyclocheilichthys heteronema
- Cyclocheilichthys lagleri
- Cyclocheilichthys repasson
- Satinfin shiner (Cyprinella analostana)
- Ocmulgee shiner (Cyprinella callisema)
- Alabama shiner (Cyprinella callistia)
- Bluntface shiner (Cyprinella camura)
- Greenfin shiner (Cyprinella chloristia)
- Whitetail shiner (Cyprinella galactura)
- Tallapoosa shiner (Cyprinella gibbsi)
- Thicklip chub (Cyprinella labrosa)
- Bannerfin shiner (Cyprinella leedsi)
- Red shiner (Cyprinella lutrensis)
- Whitefin shiner (Cyprinella nivea)
- Fieryblack shiner (Cyprinella pyrrhomelas)
- Spotfin shiner (Cyprinella spiloptera)
- Tricolor shiner (Cyprinella trichroistia)
- Blacktail shiner (Cyprinella venusta)
- Steelcolor shiner (Cyprinella whipplei)
- Santee chub (Cyprinella zanema)
- Hadramaut lotak (Cyprinion acinaces)
- Smallmouth lotak (Cyprinion kais)
- Largemouth lotak (Cyprinion macrostomum)
- Arabian lotak (Cyprinion mhalensis)
- Indus lotak (Cyprinion watsoni)
- Cyprinus rubrofuscus
- Pearl danio (Danio albolineatus)
- Glowlight danio (Danio choprai)
- Danio dangila
- Blue danio (Danio kerri)
- Zebrafish (Danio rerio)
- Rose danio (Danio roseus)
- Danionella translucida
- Filament barb (Dawkinsia filamentosa)
- Giant danio (Devario aequipinnatus)
- Bengal danio (Devario devario)
- Devario fangfangae
- Devario gibber
- Devario laoensis
- Devario leptos
- Malabar danio (Devario malabaricus)
- Queen danio (Devario regina)
- Roundnose minnow (Dionda episcopa)
- Guadalupe roundnose minnow (Dionda nigrotaeniata)
- Nueces roundnose minnow (Dionda serena)
- Discherodontus ashmeadi
- Discherodontus schroederi
- Discogobio tetrabarbatus
- Discogobio yunnanensis
- Distoechodon tumirostris
- Lake sardine (Engraulicypris sardella)
- Rainbow shark (Epalzeorhynchos frenatum)
- Longjaw minnow (Ericymba amplamala)
- Silverjaw minnow (Ericymba buccata)
- Streamline chub (Erimystax dissimilis)
- Ozark chub (Erimystax harryi)
- Blotched chub (Erimystax insignis)
- Gravel chub (Erimystax x-punctatus)
- Burmese flying barb (Esomus ahli)
- Esomus altus
- Esomus barbatus
- Esomus caudiocellatus
- Esomus danrica
- Striped flying barb (Esomus metallicus)
- Esomus thermoicos
- Tonguetied minnow (Exoglossum laurae)
- Cutlip minnow (Exoglossum maxillingua)
- Garra aethiopica
- Annandale garra (Garra annandalei)
- Oman garra (Garra barreimiae)
- Garra blanfordii
- Garra bourreti
- Cambodian logsucker (Garra cambodgiensis)
- Garra congoensis
- Barbless disc-barb (Garra cryptonemus)
- Garra dembecha
- Cameroon logsucker (Garra dembeensis)
- Garra fasciacauda
- Garra fuliginosa
- Garra geba
- Gotyla (Garra gotyla)
- Garra ignestii
- Kemp garra (Garra kempi)
- Lamta garra (Garra lamta)
- Garra lissorhynchus
- Garra makiensis
- Cauvery garra (Garra mcclellandi)
- Mullya garra (Garra mullya)
- Naga garra (Garra naganensis)
- Garra nasuta
- Garra notata
- Garra orientalis
- Garra ornata
- Doctor fish (Garra rufa)
- Aden garra (Garra sahilia)
- Nilgiri garra (Garra stenorhynchus)
- Garra theunensis
- Arabian garra (Garra tibanica)
- Small-mouth garra (Garra variabilis)
- Garra waterloti
- Gibelion catla
- Utah chub (Gila atraria)
- Blue chub (Gila coerulea)
- Rio Grande chub (Gila pandora)
- Gnathopogon nicholsi
- Gobio alverniae
- Don gudgeon (Gobio brevicirris)
- Gobio bulgaricus
- Carpathian gudgeon (Gobio carpathicus)
- Colchic gudgeon (Gobio caucasicus)
- Gudgeon (Gobio gobio)
- Gobio holurus
- Gobio kubanicus
- Iberian gudgeon (Gobio lozanoi)
- Gobio obtusirostris
- Gobio occitaniae
- Sakarya gudgeon (Gobio sakaryaensis)
- Ukrainian gudgeon (Gobio sarmaticus)
- Gobio volgensis
- Gymnocypris waddellii
- Gymnostomus caudimaculatus
- Gymnostomus lineatus
- Gymnostomus lobatus
- Gymnostomus ornatipinnis
- Gymnostomus siamensis
- Melon barb (Haludaria fasciata)
- Haludaria kannikattiensis
- Hampala dispar
- Hampala barb (Hampala macrolepidota)
- Hemibarbus longirostris
- Hemibarbus umbrifer
- Sharpbelly (Hemiculter leucisculus)
- Hemiculterella sauvagei
- Asi golden barb (Hemigrammocapoeta caudomaculata)
- Red stripe barb (Hemigrammocapoeta culiciphaga)
- Mesopotamian garra (Hemigrammocapoeta elegans)
- California roach (Hesperoleucus symmetricus)
- Green carplet (Horadandia atukorali)
- Huigobio chenhsienensis
- Brassy minnow (Hybognathus hankinsoni)
- Cypress minnow (Hybognathus hayi)
- Mississippi silvery minnow (Hybognathus nuchalis)
- Plains minnow (Hybognathus placitus)
- Eastern silvery minnow (Hybognathus regius)
- Bigeye chub (Hybopsis amblops)
- Pallid shiner (Hybopsis amnis)
- Highback chub (Hybopsis hypsinotus)
- Lined chub (Hybopsis lineapunctata)
- Rosyface chub (Hybopsis rubrifrons)
- Clear chub (Hybopsis winchelli)
- Hypselobarbus jerdoni
- Hypselobarbus kurali
- Goldfin tinfoil barb (Hypsibarbus malcolmi)
- Hypsibarbus myitkyinae
- Hypsibarbus salweenensis
- Hypsibarbus vernayi
- Hypsibarbus wetmorei
- Rednose labeo (Labeo altivelis)
- Angra labeo (Labeo angra)
- Labeo annectens
- Cunene labeo (Labeo ansorgii)
- Labeo barbatus
- Minor carp (Labeo bata)
- Labeo batesii
- Boga labeo (Labeo boga)
- Boggut labeo (Labeo boggut)
- Orangefin labeo (Labeo calbasu)
- Labeo camerunensis
- Orange River mudfish (Labeo capensis)
- Labeo chariensis
- Black sharkminnow (Labeo chrysophekadion)
- Purple labeo (Labeo congoro)
- Labeo coubie
- Labeo cyclopinnis
- Harlequin sharkminnow (Labeo cyclorhynchus)
- Redeye labeo (Labeo cylindricus)
- Labeo degeni
- Labeo dhonti
- Malabar labeo (Labeo dussumieri)
- Labeo dyocheilus
- Labeo falcipinnis
- Fringed-lipped peninsula carp (Labeo fimbriatus)
- Labeo forskalii
- Labeo fulakariensis
- Kuria labeo (Labeo gonius)
- Labeo greenii
- Gregori's labeo (Labeo gregorii)
- Labeo kawrus
- Labeo kibimbi
- Labeo kirkii
- Pigmouth carp (Labeo kontius)
- Labeo lineatus
- Labeo longipinnis
- Labeo lualabaensis
- Red-spot mudsucker (Labeo lukulae)
- Upper Zambezi labeo (Labeo lunatus)
- Labeo macrostoma
- Murree labeo (Labeo microphthalmus)
- Leaden labeo (Labeo molybdinus)
- Labeo nasus
- Nile carp (Labeo niloticus)
- Labeo nunensis
- Labeo parvus
- Bombay labeo (Labeo porcellus)
- Labeo quadribarbis
- Labeo rocadasi
- Rohu (Labeo rohita)
- Labeo rosae
- Labeo roseopunctatus
- Tugela labeo (Labeo rubromaculatus)
- Silver labeo (Labeo ruddi)
- Labeo sanagaensis
- Labeo senegalensis
- Labeo simpsoni
- Moggel (Labeo umbratus)
- Ningu (Labeo victorianus)
- Sicklefin labeo (Labeo weeksii)
- Smallmouth yellowfish (Labeobarbus aeneus)
- Drakensberg minnow (Labeobarbus aspius)
- Labeobarbus batesii
- Labeobarbus brevispinis
- Labeobarbus cardozoi
- Labeobarbus caudovittatus
- Zambezi yellowfish (Labeobarbus codringtonii)
- Labeobarbus compiniei
- Labeobarbus habereri
- Labeobarbus intermedius
- Labeobarbus malacanthus
- Largescale yellowfish (Labeobarbus marequensis)
- Labeobarbus megastoma
- Labeobarbus micronema
- Scaly yellowfish (Labeobarbus natalensis)
- Labeobarbus nedgia
- Smallscale yellowfish (Labeobarbus polylepis)
- Labeobarbus progenys
- Labeobarbus truttiformis
- Labeobarbus tsanensis
- Labeobarbus versluysii
- Labiobarbus leptocheila
- Labiobarbus siamensis
- Dadio (Laubuca dadiburjori)
- Laubuca laubuca
- Hitch (Lavinia exilicauda)
- Leptocypris lujae
- Leptocypris modestus
- Nile minnow (Leptocypris niloticus)
- Leptocypris weeksii
- Leptocypris weynsii
- Mountain dace (Leucalburnus satunini)
- Moderlieschen (Leucaspius delineatus)
- Bearn beaked dace (Leuciscus bearnensis)
- Leuciscus burdigalensis
- Leuciscus chuanchicus
- Leuciscus danilewskii
- Ide (Leuciscus idus)
- Common dace (Leuciscus leuciscus)
- Leuciscus oxyrrhis
- Mesopotamian asp (Leuciscus vorax)
- Lobocheilos melanotaenia
- Lobocheilos rhabdoura
- Albanian barbel (Luciobarbus albanicus)
- Luciobarbus bocagei
- Luciobarbus graellsii
- Lydian barbel (Luciobarbus lydianus)
- Mursa (Luciobarbus mursa)
- Levantine barbel (Luciobarbus pectoralis)
- Andalusian barbel (Luciobarbus sclateri)
- Shark minnow (Luciosoma bleekeri)
- White shiner (Luxilus albeolus)
- Cardinal shiner (Luxilus cardinalis)
- Crescent shiner (Luxilus cerasinus)
- Striped shiner (Luxilus chrysocephalus)
- Warpaint shiner (Luxilus coccogenis)
- Common shiner (Luxilus cornutus)
- Duskystripe shiner (Luxilus pilsbryi)
- Bleeding shiner (Luxilus zonatus)
- Bandfin shiner (Luxilus zonistius)
- Blueside shiner (Lythrurus ardens)
- Blacktip shiner (Lythrurus atrapiculus)
- Pretty shiner (Lythrurus bellus)
- Scarlet shiner (Lythrurus fasciolaris)
- Ribbon shiner (Lythrurus fumeus)
- Mountain shiner (Lythrurus lirus)
- Pinewoods shiner (Lythrurus matutinus)
- Cherryfin shiner (Lythrurus roseipinnis)
- Ouachita Mountain shiner (Lythrurus snelsoni)
- Redfin shiner (Lythrurus umbratilis)
- Speckled chub (Macrhybopsis aestivalis)
- Sturgeon chub (Macrhybopsis gelida)
- Shoal chub (Macrhybopsis hyostoma)
- Burrhead chub (Macrhybopsis marconis)
- Sicklefin chub (Macrhybopsis meeki)
- Silver chub (Macrhybopsis storeriana)
- Allegheny pearl dace (Margariscus margarita)
- Northern pearl dace (Margariscus nachtriebi)
- Wuchang bream (Megalobrama amblycephala)
- Bengala barb (Megarasbora elanga)
- River sardine (Mesobola brevianalis)
- Malagarasi sardine (Mesobola spinifer)
- Taiwan lesser-bream (Metzia formosae)
- Metzia lineata
- Microdevario gatesi
- Microdevario kubotai
- Microdevario nanus
- Microphysogobio chinssuensis
- Microphysogobio fukiensis
- Microphysogobio kachekensis
- Microphysogobio kiatingensis
- Microphysogobio tafangensis
- Kinneret bream (Mirogrex terraesanctae)
- Peamouth (Mylocheilus caurinus)
- Mylopharodon conocephalus
- Mystacoleucus argenteus
- Mystacoleucus atridorsalis
- Mystacoleucus chilopterus
- Mystacoleucus ectypus
- Mystacoleucus greenwayi
- Mystacoleucus marginatus
- Athi sardine (Neobola fluviatilis)
- Neobola moeruensis
- Neobola stellae
- Neolissochilus paucisquamatus
- Neolissochilus soroides
- Neolissochilus stracheyi
- Neolissochilus vittatus
- Redspot chub (Nocomis asper)
- Hornyhead chub (Nocomis biguttatus)
- Redtail chub (Nocomis effusus)
- Bluehead chub (Nocomis leptocephalus)
- River chub (Nocomis micropogon)
- Bigmouth chub (Nocomis platyrhynchus)
- Bull chub (Nocomis raneyi)
- Golden shiner (Notemigonus crysoleucas)
- Whitemouth shiner (Notropis alborus)
- Highfin shiner (Notropis altipinnis)
- Texas shiner (Notropis amabilis)
- Orangefin shiner (Notropis ammophilus)
- Comely shiner (Notropis amoenus)
- Pugnose shiner (Notropis anogenus)
- Popeye shiner (Notropis ariommus)
- Burrhead shiner (Notropis asperifrons)
- Emerald shiner (Notropis atherinoides)
- Blackspot shiner (Notropis atrocaudalis)
- Rough shiner (Notropis baileyi)
- Red River shiner (Notropis bairdi)
- Bridle shiner (Notropis bifrenatus)
- River shiner (Notropis blennius)
- Bigeye shiner (Notropis boops)
- Ghost shiner (Notropis buchanani)
- Silverside shiner (Notropis candidus)
- Ironcolor shiner (Notropis chalybaeus)
- Redlip shiner (Notropis chiliticus)
- Greenhead shiner (Notropis chlorocephalus)
- Rainbow shiner (Notropis chrosomus)
- Dusky shiner (Notropis cummingsae)
- Bigmouth shiner (Notropis dorsalis)
- Fluvial shiner (Notropis edwardraneyi)
- Wedgespot shiner (Notropis greenei)
- Redeye chub (Notropis harperi)
- Blackchin shiner (Notropis heterodon)
- Blacknose shiner (Notropis heterolepis)
- Spottail shiner (Notropis hudsonius)
- Rio Grande shiner (Notropis jemezanus)
- Tennessee shiner (Notropis leuciodus)
- Longnose shiner (Notropis longirostris)
- Yellowfin shiner (Notropis lutipinnis)
- Taillight shiner (Notropis maculatus)
- Highland shiner (Notropis micropteryx)
- Ozark minnow (Notropis nubilus)
- Carmine shiner (Notropis percobromus)
- Coastal shiner (Notropis petersoni)
- Silver shiner (Notropis photogenis)
- Chub shiner (Notropis potteri)
- Swallowtail shiner (Notropis procne)
- Yazoo shiner (Notropis rafinesquei)
- Rosyface shiner (Notropis rubellus)
- Saffron shiner (Notropis rubricroceus)
- Bedrock shiner (Notropis rupestris)
- Sabine shiner (Notropis sabinae)
- New River shiner (Notropis scabriceps)
- Sandbar shiner (Notropis scepticus)
- Silverband shiner (Notropis shumardi)
- Mirror shiner (Notropis spectrunculus)
- Silverstripe shiner (Notropis stilbius)
- Sand shiner (Notropis stramineus)
- Telescope shiner (Notropis telescopus)
- Weed shiner (Notropis texanus)
- Topeka shiner (Notropis topeka)
- Skygazer shiner (Notropis uranoscopus)
- Mimic shiner (Notropis volucellus)
- Channel shiner (Notropis wickliffi)
- Coosa shiner (Notropis xaenocephalus)
- Ochetobius elongatus
- Onychostoma fusiforme
- Onychostoma meridionale
- Opsaridium loveridgii
- Southern barred minnow (Opsaridium peringueyi)
- Dwarf sanjika (Opsaridium tweddleorum)
- Opsaridium ubangiense
- Barred minnow (Opsaridium zambezense)
- Opsariichthys bidens
- Opsarius barnoides
- Opsarius bernatziki
- Opsarius koratensis
- Opsarius ornatus
- Opsarius pulchellus
- Pugnose minnow (Opsopoeodus emiliae)
- Oregon chub (Oregonichthys crameri)
- Oreichthys cosuatis
- Sacramento blackfish (Orthodon microlepidotus)
- Malabar osteobrama (Osteobrama bakeri)
- Osteobrama cotio
- Osteobrama cunma
- Osteobrama feae
- Nilgiri osteobrama (Osteobrama neilli)
- Bheema osteobrama (Osteobrama vigorsii)
- Kantaka barb (Osteochilichthys brevidorsalis)
- Osteochilichthys thomassi
- Osteochilus enneaporos
- Dusky face carp (Osteochilus lini)
- Osteochilus melanopleura
- Bonylip barb (preferred over 'Pla rong mai tub') (Osteochilus microcephalus)
- Nash barb (Osteochilus nashii)
- Osteochilus salsburyi
- Osteochilus spilurus
- Hard-lipped barb (Osteochilus vittatus)
- Waandersii's hard-lipped barb (Osteochilus waandersii)
- Oxygaster anomalura
- Albanian roach (Pachychilon pictum)
- Parachela hypophthalmus
- Parachela maculicauda
- Parachela oxygastroides
- Parachela siamensis
- Parachela williaminae
- Parachondrostoma miegii
- Paralaubuca barroni
- Paralaubuca harmandi
- Paralaubuca riveroi
- Paralaubuca typus
- Khandalla minnow (Parapsilorhynchus tentaculatus)
- Parasikukia maculata
- Cá lá giang (Parazacco fasciatus)
- Dáska (Pelasgus stymphalicus)
- Ziege (Pelecus cultratus)
- Rosy barb (Pethia conchonius)
- Pethia didi
- Pethia erythromycter
- Golden barb (Pethia gelius)
- Pethia guganio
- Pethia meingangbii
- Pethia narayani
- Spottedsail barb (Pethia phutunio)
- Dotted sawfin barb (Pethia punctata)
- Pethia stoliczkanus
- Pethia thelys
- Ticto barb (Pethia ticto)
- Dnieper chub (Petroleuciscus borysthenicus)
- Smyrna chub (Petroleuciscus smyrnaeus)
- Riffle minnow (Phenacobius catostomus)
- Fatlips minnow (Phenacobius crassilabrum)
- Suckermouth minnow (Phenacobius mirabilis)
- Kanawha minnow (Phenacobius teretulus)
- Stargazing minnow (Phenacobius uranops)
- Phoxinus bigerri
- Phoxinus colchicus
- Phoxinus lumaireul
- Common minnow (Phoxinus phoxinus)
- Phoxinus septimaniae
- Bluntnose minnow (Pimephales notatus)
- Fathead minnow (Pimephales promelas)
- Slim minnow (Pimephales tenellus)
- Bullhead minnow (Pimephales vigilax)
- Placocheilus caudofasciatus
- Smallscale yellowfin (Plagiognathops microlepis)
- Flathead chub (Platygobio gracilis)
- Platysmacheilus exiguus
- Sacramento splittail (Pogonichthys macrolepidotus)
- Poropuntius bantamensis
- Poropuntius burtoni
- Poropuntius carinatus
- Poropuntius faucis
- Poropuntius genyognathus
- Poropuntius laoensis
- Poropuntius normani
- Prolabeops melanhypopterus
- South European nase (Protochondrostoma genei)
- Iberian nase (Pseudochondrostoma polylepis)
- Pseudogobio vaillanti
- Pseudogyrinocheilus prochilus
- Pseudohemiculter hainanensis
- Pseudolaubuca engraulis
- Pseudolaubuca sinensis
- Tuz Lake spring minnow (Pseudophoxinus battalgili)
- Levantine minnow (Pseudophoxinus libani)
- Levantine spring minnow (Pseudophoxinus zeregi)
- Pseudorasbora elongata
- Stone moroko (Pseudorasbora parva)
- Broadstripe shiner (Pteronotropis euryzonus)
- Apalachee shiner (Pteronotropis grandipinnis)
- Sailfin shiner (Pteronotropis hypselopterus)
- Metallic shiner (Pteronotropis metallicus)
- Flagfin shiner (Pteronotropis signipinnis)
- Lowland shiner (Pteronotropis stonei)
- Ptychobarbus dipogon
- Sacramento pikeminnow (Ptychocheilus grandis)
- Northern pikeminnow (Ptychocheilus oregonensis)
- Umpqua pikeminnow (Ptychocheilus umpquae)
- Puntigrus partipentazona
- Puntioplites falcifer
- Puntioplites proctozystron
- Puntioplites waandersi
- Red side barb (Puntius bimaculatus)
- Puntius brevis
- Swamp barb (Puntius chola)
- Puntius dorsalis
- Parrah barb (Puntius parrah)
- Puntius pugio
- Khavli barb (Puntius sahyadriensis)
- Pool barb (Puntius sophore)
- Onespot barb (Puntius terio)
- Greenstripe barb (Puntius vittatus)
- Raiamas batesii
- Trout barb (Raiamas bola)
- Raiamas buchholzi
- Coppernose barb (Raiamas christyi)
- Burmese trout (Raiamas guttatus)
- Lake Rukwa minnow (Raiamas moorii)
- Raiamas salmolucius
- Senegal minnow (Raiamas senegalensis)
- Raiamas steindachneri
- Rasbora amplistriga
- Rasbora atridorsalis
- Pale rasbora (Rasbora aurotaenia)
- Blackline rasbora (Rasbora borapetensis)
- Greater scissortail (Rasbora caudimaculata)
- Cauvery rasbora (Rasbora caverii)
- Slender rasbora (Rasbora daniconius)
- Twospot rasbora (Rasbora elegans)
- Rasbora labiosa
- Redstripe rasbora (Rasbora pauciperforata)
- Largescaled rasbora (Rasbora paucisqualis)
- Sidestripe rasbora (Rasbora paviana)
- Gangetic scissortail rasbora (Rasbora rasbora)
- Rasbora rubrodorsalis
- Dwarf scissortail rasbora (Rasbora spilocerca)
- Chinese rasbora (Rasbora steineri)
- Yellowtail rasbora (Rasbora tornieri)
- Scissortail rasbora (Rasbora trilineata)
- Rasbora vulgaris
- Silver cyprinid (Rastrineobola argentea)
- Blacknose dace (Rhinichthys atratulus)
- Longnose dace (Rhinichthys cataractae)
- Umpqua dace (Rhinichthys evermanni)
- Leopard dace (Rhinichthys falcatus)
- Western blacknose dace (Rhinichthys obtusus)
- Speckled dace (Rhinichthys osculus)
- Umatilla dace (Rhinichthys umatilla)
- European bitterling (Rhodeus amarus)
- Georgian bitterling (Rhodeus colchicus)
- Rhodeus fangi
- Light's bitterling (Rhodeus lighti)
- Rhodeus meridionalis
- Rhodeus rheinardti
- Amur bitterling (Rhodeus sericeus)
- Rhodeus sinensis
- Rhodeus spinalis
- Chekanovskii's minnow (Rhynchocypris czekanowskii)
- Swamp minnow (Rhynchocypris percnurus)
- Redside shiner (Richardsonius balteatus)
- Lahontan redside (Richardsonius egregius)
- Vatani rohtee (Rohtee ogilbii)
- White-finned gudgeon (Romanogobio albipinnatus)
- Northern whitefin gudgeon (Romanogobio belingi)
- Romanogobio ciscaucasicus
- Romanogobio elimeius
- Kessler's gudgeon (Romanogobio kesslerii)
- South Caucasian gudgeon (Romanogobio macropterus)
- Romanogobio parvus
- Romanogobio pentatrichus
- Don whitefin gudgeon (Romanogobio tanaiticus)
- Danube gudgeon (Romanogobio uranoscopus)
- Danube whitefin gudgeon (Romanogobio vladykovi)
- Rutilus aula
- Rutilus basak
- Vobla (Rutilus caspicus)
- Black sea roach (Rutilus frisii)
- Rutilus heckelii
- Rutilus karamani
- Rutilus ohridanus
- Pigo (Rutilus pigus)
- Common roach (Rutilus rutilus)
- Cactus roach (Rutilus virgo)
- Silver razorbelly minnow (Salmophasia acinaces)
- Large razorbelly minnow (Salmophasia bacaila)
- Bloch razorbelly minnow (Salmophasia balookee)
- Boopis razorbelly minnow (Salmophasia boopis)
- Novacula razor belly minnow (Salmophasia novacula)
- Finescale razorbelly minnow (Salmophasia phulo)
- Sardinella razorbelly minnow (Salmophasia sardinella)
- Salmophasia sladoni
- Mahanadi razorbelly minnow (Salmophasia untrahi)
- Sarcocheilichthys parvus
- Sarcocheilichthys sinensis
- Scaphesthes macrolepis
- Scaphiodonichthys acanthopterus
- Scaphiodonichthys burmanicus
- Scaphognathops stejnegeri
- Common rudd (Scardinius erythrophthalmus)
- Scardinius hesperidicus
- Skadar rudd (Scardinius knezevici)
- Scardinius plotizza
- Gorgak (Schizocypris altidorsalis)
- Schizothorax griseus
- Schizothorax heterochilus
- Schizothorax lissolabiatus
- Nepalese snowtrout (Schizothorax macrophthalmus)
- Schizothorax oconnori
- Transcaspian marinka (Schizothorax pelzami)
- Dinnawah snowtrout (Schizothorax progastus)
- Schizothorax waltoni
- Securicula gora
- Dusky labiate-barbel (Semilabeo obscurus)
- Creek chub (Semotilus atromaculatus)
- Fallfish (Semotilus corporalis)
- Sandhills chub (Semotilus lumbee)
- Dixie chub (Semotilus thoreauianus)
- Sikukia stejnegeri
- Sinibrama affinis
- Sinibrama macrops
- Tui chub (Siphateles bicolor)
- Spinibarbus denticulatus
- Squalidus atromaculatus
- Squalidus wolterstorffi
- Trasimeno chub (Squalius albus)
- Anatolian pike chub (Squalius anatolicus)
- Squalius aphipsi
- Tuzla chub (Squalius aristotelis)
- Mesopotamian chub (Squalius berak)
- Squalius carolitertii
- European chub (Squalius cephalus)
- Marmara chub (Squalius cii)
- Aegean chub (Squalius fellowesii)
- Squalius laietanus
- Mesopotamian pike chub (Squalius lepidus)
- Squalius orpheus
- Squalius pamvoticus
- Squalius peloponnensis
- Squalius platyceps
- Squalius prespensis
- Sakarya chub (Squalius pursakensis)
- Squalius squalus
- Transcaucasian chub (Squalius turcicus)
- Squalius vardarensis
- Systomus jacobusboehlkei
- Olive barb (Systomus sarana)
- Telestes montenigrinus
- Telestes muticellus
- Telestes pleurobipunctatus
- Souffia (Telestes souffia)
- Anchovy rasbora (Thryssocypris tonlesapensis)
- Tiny scale barb (Thynnichthys thynnoides)
- Tench (Tinca tinca)
- Toxabramis houdemeri
- Lambchop rasbora (Trigonostigma espei)
- Harlequin rasbora (Trigonostigma heteromorpha)
- Tropidophoxinellus hellenicus
- Varicorhinus altipinnis
- Varicorhinus axelrodi
- Varicorhinus beso
- Varicorhinus ensifer
- Varicorhinus fimbriatus
- Varicorhinus macrolepidotus
- Varicorhinus mariae
- Pungwe chiselmouth (Varicorhinus pungweensis)
- Varicorhinus sandersi
- Varicorhinus steindachneri
- Varicorhinus tornieri
- Varicorhinus werneri
- Macedonian vimba (Vimba melanops)
- Menderes vimba (Vimba mirabilis)
- Zarte (Vimba vimba)
- Xenocypris macrolepis
- Yaoshan carp (Yaoshanicus arcus)

Subspecies

- Niger barb (Barbus bynni occidentalis)
- Barbus bynni waldroni
- Systomus sarana subnasutus

==== Psilorhynchids ====
- Balitora minnow (Psilorhynchus balitora)
- Rainbow minnow (Psilorhynchus gracilis)
- Homaloptera minnow (Psilorhynchus homaloptera)
- Psilorhynchus nepalensis
- Stone carp (Psilorhynchus pseudecheneis)
- River stone carp (Psilorhynchus sucatio)

==== Suckers ====
- River carpsucker (Carpiodes carpio)
- Quillback (Carpiodes cyprinus)
- Highfin carpsucker (Carpiodes velifer)
- Utah sucker (Catostomus ardens)
- Yaqui sucker (Catostomus bernardini)
- Longnose sucker (Catostomus catostomus)
- Desert sucker (Catostomus clarkii)
- Bridgelip sucker (Catostomus columbianus)
- White sucker (Catostomus commersonii)
- Bluehead sucker (Catostomus discobolus)
- Owens sucker (Catostomus fumeiventris)
- Sonora sucker (Catostomus insignis)
- Flannelmouth sucker (Catostomus latipinnis)
- Largescale sucker (Catostomus macrocheilus)
- Sacramento sucker (Catostomus occidentalis)
- Mountain sucker (Catostomus platyrhynchus)
- Klamath smallscale sucker (Catostomus rimiculus)
- Tahoe sucker (Catostomus tahoensis)
- Blue sucker (Cycleptus elongatus)
- Southeastern blue sucker (Cycleptus meridionalis)
- Western creek chubsucker (Erimyzon claviformis)
- Creek chubsucker (Erimyzon oblongus)
- Lake chubsucker (Erimyzon sucetta)
- Sharpfin chubsucker (Erimyzon tenuis)
- Alabama hogsucker (Hypentelium etowanum)
- Northern hogsucker (Hypentelium nigricans)
- Roanoke hog sucker (Hypentelium roanokense)
- Smallmouth buffalo (Ictiobus bubalus)
- Bigmouth buffalo (Ictiobus cyprinellus)
- Black buffalo (Ictiobus niger)
- Spotted sucker (Minytrema melanops)
- Silver redhorse (Moxostoma anisurum)
- Bigeye jumprock (Moxostoma ariommum)
- Smallmouth redhorse (Moxostoma breviceps)
- River redhorse (Moxostoma carinatum)
- Blacktip jumprock (Moxostoma cervinum)
- Notchlip redhorse (Moxostoma collapsum)
- Gray redhorse (Moxostoma congestum)
- Black redhorse (Moxostoma duquesnei)
- Golden redhorse (Moxostoma erythrurum)
- Greater jumprock (Moxostoma lachneri)
- Shorthead redhorse (Moxostoma macrolepidotum)
- V-lip redhorse (Moxostoma pappillosum)
- Pealip redhorse (Moxostoma pisolabrum)
- Blacktail redhorse (Moxostoma poecilurum)
- Striped jumprock (Moxostoma rupiscartes)
- Greater redhorse (Moxostoma valenciennesi)
- Torrent sucker (Thoburnia rhothoeca)

==== Gyrinocheilids ====
- Honey sucker (Gyrinocheilus aymonieri)
- Spotted algae eater (Gyrinocheilus pennocki)

==== Vaillantellids ====
- Vaillantella euepiptera
- Vaillantella maassi

=== Gasterosteiformes ===
Includes sticklebacks and relatives.

- Fourspine stickleback (Apeltes quadracus)
- Tubenose (Aulichthys japonicus)
- Brook stickleback (Culaea inconstans)
- Three-spined stickleback (Gasterosteus aculeatus)
- Gasterosteus gymnurus
- Gasterosteus islandicus
- Blackspotted stickleback (Gasterosteus wheatlandi)
- Indostomus paradoxus
- Pungitius laevis
- Ukrainian stickleback (Pungitius platygaster)
- Ninespine stickleback (Pungitius pungitius)
- Sea stickleback (Spinachia spinachia)

=== Osmeriformes ===
Osmeriformes includes freshwater smelts and allies. There are 90 species in the order Osmeriformes assessed as least concern.

==== Galaxiids ====
- Climbing galaxias (Galaxias brevipinnis)
- Banded kokopu (Galaxias fasciatus)
- Common galaxias (Galaxias maculatus)
- Alpine galaxias (Galaxias paucispondylus)
- Common river galaxias (Galaxias vulgaris)
- Chatham mudfish (Neochanna rekohua)

==== Smelts ====
- Pond smelt (Hypomesus olidus)
- Osmerus dentex
- European smelt (Osmerus eperlanus)
- Rainbow smelt (Osmerus mordax)
- Longfin smelt (Spirinchus thaleichthys)
- Eulachon (Thaleichthys pacificus)

==== Alepocephalids ====
- Agassiz' smooth-head (Alepocephalus agassizii)
- Small scaled brown slickhead (Alepocephalus australis)
- Owston's slickhead (Alepocephalus owstoni)
- Smalleye smooth-head (Alepocephalus productus)
- Risso's smooth-head (Alepocephalus rostratus)
- Asquamiceps caeruleus
- Asquamiceps hjorti
- Bajacalifornia calcarata
- Bigeye smooth-head (Bajacalifornia megalops)
- Black warrior (Bathylaco nigricans)
- Fangtooth smooth-head (Bathyprion danae)
- Koefoed's smooth-head (Bathytroctes macrolepis)
- Michael Sars smooth-head (Bathytroctes michaelsarsi)
- Smallscale smooth-head (Bathytroctes microlepis)
- Bathytroctes squamosus
- Long-fin smooth-head (Conocara macropterum)
- Murray's smooth-head (Conocara murrayi)
- Salmon smooth-head (Conocara salmoneum)
- Toothless smooth-head (Einara edentula)
- Loosescale smooth-head (Einara macrolepis)
- Krefft's smooth-head (Herwigia kreffti)
- Grenadier smooth-head (Leptoderma macrops)
- Narcetes erimelas
- Blackhead salmon (Narcetes stomias)
- Starry smooth-head (Photostylus pycnopterus)
- Abyssal smooth-head (Rinoctes nasutus)
- Softskin smooth-head (Rouleina attrita)
- Madeiran smooth-head (Rouleina maderensis)
- Antillean slickhead (Talismania antillarum)
- Talismania bifurcata
- Talismania homoptera
- Talismania longifilis
- Threadfin smooth-head (Talismania mekistonema)
- Bluntsnout smooth-head (Xenodermichthys copei)

==== Argentinidae ====
- Alice Argentina (Argentina aliceae)
- North-pacific argentine (Argentina sialis)
- Striated argentine (Argentina striata)
- Smalltoothed argentine (Glossanodon leioglossus)
- Glossanodon polli
- Pygmy argentine (Glossanodon pygmaeus)

==== Platytroctids ====
- Palebelly searsid (Barbantus curvifrons)
- Bighead searsid (Holtbyrnia anomala)
- Holtbyrnia cyanocephala
- Holtbyrnia innesi
- Bigeye searsid (Holtbyrnia macrops)
- Palegold searsid (Maulisia argipalla)
- Maul's searsid (Maulisia mauli)
- Smallscale searsid (Maulisia microlepis)
- Dark searsid (Mentodus facilis)
- Longbilled searsid (Mentodus longirostris)
- Midridged searsid (Mentodus mesalirus)
- Largepore tubeshoulder (Mentodus perforatus)
- Beaked searsid (Mentodus rostratus)
- Multipore searsid (Normichthys operosus)
- Legless searsid (Platytroctes apus)
- Shining tubeshoulder (Sagamichthys abei)
- Schnakenbeck's searsid (Sagamichthys schnakenbecki)
- Koefoed's searsid (Searsia koefoedi)

==== Deep-sea smelts ====
- Grey's deepsea smelt (Bathylagichthys greyae)
- Bathylagichthys problematicus
- Silver big-eye smelt (Bathylagoides argyrogaster)
- Longsnout blacksmelt (Dolicholagus longirostris)
- Bigscale deepsea smelt (Melanolagus bericoides)
- Stout blacksmelt (Pseudobathylagus milleri)

==== Barreleyes ====
- Dolichopteroides binocularis
- Brownsnout spookfish (Dolichopteryx longipes)
- Mirrorbelly (Opisthoproctus grimaldii)
- Opisthoproctus soleatus
- Glasshead barreleye (Rhynchohyalus natalensis)
- Winteria telescopa

==== Microstomatids ====
- Slender argentine (Microstoma microstoma)
- Nansenia atlantica
- Nansenia tenera
- Xenophthalmichthys danae

==== Other Osmeriformes species ====
- Agassiz's smooth-head (Leptochilichthys agassizii)
- Short-snout icefish (Neosalanx tangkahkeii)
- New Zealand smelt (Retropinna retropinna)
- Stokell's smelt (Stokellia anisodon)

=== Percopsiformes ===
Trout-perch and its allies

- Pirate perch (Aphredoderus sayanus)
- Swampfish (Chologaster cornuta)
- Spring cavefish (Forbesichthys agassizii)
- Trout-perch (Percopsis omiscomaycus)
- Sand roller (Percopsis transmontana)

=== Catfishes ===
There are 707 catfish species assessed as least concern.

==== Ictalurids ====
- Snail bullhead (Ameiurus brunneus)
- Ictalurus catus (Ameiurus catus)
- Black bullhead (Ameiurus melas)
- Yellow bullhead (Ameiurus natalis)
- Brown bullhead (Ameiurus nebulosus)
- Flat bullhead (Ameiurus platycephalus)
- Spotted bullhead (Ameiurus serracanthus)
- Blue catfish (Ictalurus furcatus)
- Channel catfish (Ictalurus punctatus)
- Ozark madtom (Noturus albater)
- Elegant madtom (Noturus elegans)
- Mountain madtom (Noturus eleutherus)
- Slender madtom (Noturus exilis)
- Checkered madtom (Noturus flavater)
- Stonecat (Noturus flavus)
- Black madtom (Noturus funebris)
- Tadpole madtom (Noturus gyrinus)
- Least madtom (Noturus hildebrandi)
- Margined madtom (Noturus insignis)
- Speckled madtom (Noturus leptacanthus)
- Eastern Ozark madtom (Noturus maydeni)
- Brindled madtom (Noturus miurus)
- Freckled madtom (Noturus nocturnus)
- Brown madtom (Noturus phaeus)
- Flathead catfish (Pylodictis olivaris)

==== Pangasiidae ====
- Basa fish (Pangasius bocourti)
- Pangasius conchophilus
- Spot pangasius (Pangasius larnaudii)
- Pangasius macronema
- Mekong catfish (Pangasius mekongensis)
- Pangasius nasutus
- Pangasius pangasius
- Pangasius polyuranodon
- Pseudolais pleurotaenia

==== Heptapterids ====
- Acentronichthys leptos
- Brachyrhamdia imitator
- Cetopsorhamdia boquillae
- Cetopsorhamdia nasus
- Chasmocranus rosae
- Imparfinis usmai
- Myoglanis potaroensis
- Pimelodella conquetaensis
- Pimelodella cristata
- Pimelodella elongata
- Pimelodella eutaenia
- Pimelodella grisea
- Pimelodella modestus
- Pimelodella pappenheimi
- Pimelodella reyesi

==== Astroblepids ====
- Astroblepus chapmani
- Astroblepus cirratus
- Astroblepus cyclopus
- Astroblepus grixalvii
- Astroblepus guentheri
- Astroblepus homodon
- Astroblepus jurubidae
- Astroblepus longifilis
- Astroblepus micrescens
- Astroblepus retropinnus
- Astroblepus trifasciatus
- Astroblepus unifasciatus

==== Sisorids ====
- Exostoma labiatum
- Gagata cenia
- Gagata dolichonema
- Gagata gagata
- Gagata melanopterus
- Gagata sexualis
- Glyptosternon maculatum
- Glyptothorax alaknandi
- Glyptothorax annandalei
- Glyptothorax botius
- Glyptothorax burmanicus
- Glyptothorax callopterus
- Glyptothorax cavia
- Glyptothorax chindwinica
- Glyptothorax dorsalis
- Glyptothorax fokiensis
- Glyptothorax garhwali
- Glyptothorax granulus
- Glyptothorax horai
- Glyptothorax indicus
- Glyptothorax lampris
- Glyptothorax laosensis
- Glyptothorax lonah
- Glyptothorax macromaculatus
- Glyptothorax ngapang
- Glyptothorax pectinopterus
- Glyptothorax stolickae
- Glyptothorax telchitta
- Three-lined catfish (Glyptothorax trilineatus)
- Glyptothorax ventrolineatus
- Gogangra viridescens
- Nangra assamensis
- Kosi nangra (Nangra nangra)
- Oreoglanis hypsiurus
- Oreoglanis infulatus
- Oreoglanis macropterus
- Parachiloglanis hodgarti
- Pareuchiloglanis longicauda
- Pareuchiloglanis poilanei
- Pseudecheneis serracula
- Pseudecheneis sulcata
- Sisor rabdophorus

==== Silurids ====
- Belodontichthys truncatus
- Hemisilurus mekongensis
- Kryptopterus bicirrhis
- Kryptopterus cryptopterus
- Kryptopterus geminus
- Kryptopterus macrocephalus
- Kryptopterus micronema
- Goan catfish (Ompok malabaricus)
- Ompok urbaini
- Phalacronotus apogon
- Phalacronotus bleekeri
- Pterocryptis anomala
- Burmese silurus (Pterocryptis berdmorei)
- Pterocryptis cochinchinensis
- Silurichthys schneideri
- Amur catfish (Silurus asotus)
- Wels catfish (Silurus glanis)
- Silurus meridionalis
- Mesopotamian catfish (Silurus triostegus)

==== Trichomycterids ====
- Copionodon pecten
- Eremophilus mutisii
- Glanapteryx niobium
- Malacoglanis gelatinosus
- Paravandellia phaneronema
- Plectrochilus wieneri
- Pseudostegophilus haemomyzon
- Trichomycterus aguarague
- Trichomycterus banneaui
- Trichomycterus caliensis
- Trichomycterus chaberti
- Trichomycterus chapmani
- Trichomycterus fassli
- Trichomycterus gorgona
- Trichomycterus latistriatus
- Trichomycterus longibarbatus
- Trichomycterus maracaiboensis
- Trichomycterus megantoni
- Trichomycterus nigromaculatus
- Trichomycterus retropinnis
- Trichomycterus sandovali
- Trichomycterus santanderensis
- Trichomycterus sketi
- Trichomycterus spilosoma
- Trichomycterus stawiarski
- Trichomycterus stellatus
- Trichomycterus taenia
- Trichomycterus uisae

==== Loach catfishes ====
- Amphilius atesuensis
- Amphilius brevis
- Amphilius cryptobullatus
- Marbled mountain catfish (Amphilius jacksonii)
- Broadtail mountain catfish (Amphilius laticaudatus)
- Amphilius longirostris
- Natal mountain catfish (Amphilius natalensis)
- Mountain barbel (Amphilius platychir)
- Amphilius pulcher
- Amphilius rheophilus
- Common mountain catfish (Amphilius uranoscopus)
- Amphilius zairensis
- Andersonia leptura
- Belonoglanis tenuis
- Congoglanis alula
- Doumea angolensis
- Doumea sanaga
- Doumea typica
- Leptoglanis xenognathus
- Paramphilius baudoni
- Phractura brevicauda
- Phractura clauseni
- Phractura lindica
- Phractura longicauda
- Phractura scaphyrhynchura
- Phractura tenuicauda
- Tetracamphilius notatus
- Trachyglanis ineac
- Zaireichthys brevis
- Zaireichthys heterurus
- Sand catlet (Zaireichthys rotundiceps)

==== Claroteids ====
- Auchenoglanis biscutatus
- Giraffe catfish (Auchenoglanis occidentalis)
- Bathybagrus tetranema
- Chrysichthys ansorgii
- Golden Nile catfish (Chrysichthys auratus)
- Chrysichthys bocagii
- Kibonde (Chrysichthys brachynema)
- Chrysichthys brevibarbis
- Kokuni (Chrysichthys cranchii)
- Chrysichthys delhezi
- Chrysichthys duttoni
- Kukumai (Chrysichthys grandis)
- Chrysichthys graueri
- Chrysichthys habereri
- Chrysichthys johnelsi
- Chrysichthys laticeps
- Chrysichthys longibarbis
- Aluminum catfish (Chrysichthys longipinnis)
- Chrysichthys mabusi
- Chrysichthys maurus
- Bagrid catfish (Chrysichthys nigrodigitatus)
- Chrysichthys ogooensis
- Chrysichthys okae
- Ornate bagrid (Chrysichthys ornatus)
- Chrysichthys platycephalus
- Chrysichthys punctatus
- Shovelnose catfish (Chrysichthys sharpii)
- Chrysichthys sianenna
- Chrysichthys stappersii
- Chrysichthys thonneri
- Chrysichthys thysi
- Chrysichthys wagenaari
- Spiny catfish (Clarotes laticeps)
- Gephyroglanis congicus
- Lophiobagrus aquilus
- Lophiobagrus brevispinis
- African bullhead (Lophiobagrus cyclurus)
- Notoglanidium boutchangai
- Flatnose catfish (Notoglanidium macrostoma)
- Parauchenoglanis altipinnis
- Parauchenoglanis balayi
- Zambezi grunter (Parauchenoglanis ngamensis)
- Parauchenoglanis punctatus
- Phyllonemus filinemus
- Spatula-barbeled catfish (Phyllonemus typus)

==== Airbreathing catfishes ====
- Bathyclarias atribranchus
- Bathyclarias eurydon
- Bathyclarias filicibarbis
- Bathyclarias foveolatus
- Bathyclarias longibarbis
- Bathyclarias loweae
- Bathyclarias nyasensis
- Bathyclarias rotundifrons
- Bathyclarias worthingtoni
- Channallabes alvarezi
- Eel catfish (Channallabes apus)
- Clariallabes centralis
- Clariallabes heterocephalus
- Clariallabes laticeps
- Clariallabes longicauda
- Clariallabes melas
- Clariallabes platyprosopos
- Clariallabes uelensis
- Clariallabes variabilis
- Clarias agboyiensis
- Clarias albopunctatus
- Alluaud's catfish (Clarias alluaudi)
- Clarias angolensis
- Clarias anguillaris
- Walking catfish (Clarias batrachus)
- Clarias buettikoferi
- Clarias buthupogon
- Clarias camerunensis
- Clarias dhonti
- Clarias dumerilii
- Clarias ebriensis
- Hong Kong catfish (Clarias fuscus)
- Clarias gabonensis
- African catfish (Clarias gariepinus)
- Clarias hilli
- Clarias jaensis
- Smooth-head catfish (Clarias liocephalus)
- Clarias longior
- Clarias macromystax
- Clarias meladerma
- Blunt-toothed African catfish (Clarias ngamensis)
- Slender walking catfish (Clarias nieuhofii)
- Clarias nigromarmoratus
- Clarias pachynema
- Clarias platycephalus
- Clarias salae
- Clarias stappersii
- Snake catfish (Clarias theodorae)
- Werner's catfish (Clarias werneri)
- Dolichallabes microphthalmus
- Gymnallabes typus
- Eel-like fattyfin catfish (Heterobranchus bidorsalis)
- Heterobranchus isopterus
- Vundu (Heterobranchus longifilis)
- Platyallabes tihoni
- Tanganikallabes mortiauxi

==== Loricariids ====
- Ancistrus bufonius
- Ancistrus caucanus
- Bushymouth catfish (Ancistrus dolichopterus)
- Ancistrus malacops
- Ancistrus megalostomus
- Ancistrus montanus
- Ancistrus occloi
- Ancistrus piriformis
- Ancistrus sericeus
- Ancistrus spinosus
- Ancistrus tamboensis
- Apistoloricaria condei
- Chaetostoma aequinoctiale
- Chaetostoma brevilabiatum
- Chaetostoma leucomelas
- Chaetostoma lineopunctatum
- Chaetostoma marginatum
- Chaetostoma niveum
- Chaetostoma patiae
- Chaetostoma taczanowskii
- Chaetostoma thomsoni
- Cordylancistrus daguae
- Corymbophanes kaiei
- Crossoloricaria bahuaja
- Crossoloricaria rhami
- Crossoloricaria venezuelae
- Whiptail catfish (Dasyloricaria filamentosa)
- Dolichancistrus carnegiei
- Dolichancistrus pediculatus
- Epactionotus gracilis
- Etsaputu relictum
- Eurycheilichthys limulus
- Farlowella knerii
- Harttia longipinna
- Hemipsilichthys papillatus
- Hypostomus ericius
- Hypostomus fonchii
- Hypostomus hemiurus
- Hypostomus holostictus
- Hypostomus luteus
- Hypostomus macrops
- Hypostomus myersi
- Hypostomus unae
- Hypostomus varimaculosus
- Lamontichthys stibaros
- Lasiancistrus heteracanthus
- Lasiancistrus schomburgkii
- Lithoxus bovallii
- Loricariichthys edentatus
- Loricariichthys hauxwelli
- Loricariichthys ucayalensis
- Otocinclus huaorani
- Otocinclus macrospilus
- Otothyris rostrata
- Oxyropsis wrightiana
- Panaqolus albomaculatus
- Panaqolus changae
- Panaque (Panaqolus dentex)
- Panaqolus gnomus
- Panaqolus nocturnus
- Parotocinclus haroldoi
- Parotocinclus longirostris
- Peckoltia furcata
- Peckoltia pankimpuju
- Pseudohemiodon apithanos
- Pseudohemiodon lamina
- Pterygoplichthys scrophus
- Pterygoplichthys undecimalis
- Rineloricaria beni
- Rineloricaria jubata
- Rineloricaria morrowi
- Rineloricaria thrissoceps
- Rineloricaria wolfei
- Spatuloricaria evansii
- Spatuloricaria gymnogaster
- Spatuloricaria puganensis
- Squaliforma tenuicauda
- Sturisoma guentheri
- Sturisoma nigrirostrum
- Sturisoma tenuirostre
- Sturisomatichthys leightoni

==== Mochokids ====
- Acanthocleithron chapini
- Atopochilus christyi
- Atopochilus savorgnani
- Pennant-tailed suckermouth (Chiloglanis anoterus)
- Chiloglanis batesii
- Chiloglanis cameronensis
- Chiloglanis congicus
- Pangani suckermouth (Chiloglanis deckenii)
- Phongolo suckermouth (Chiloglanis emarginatus)
- Okavango suckermouth (Chiloglanis fasciatus)
- Chiloglanis lukugae
- Chiloglanis microps
- Chiloglanis occidentalis
- Sawfin suckermouth (Chiloglanis paratus)
- Chiloglanis pojeri
- Shortspine suckermouth (Chiloglanis pretoriae)
- Chiloglanis sanagaensis
- Chiloglanis sardinhai
- Lowveld suckermouth (Chiloglanis swierstrai)
- Three-lobed suckermouth (Chiloglanis trilobatus)
- Chiloglanis voltae
- Euchilichthys astatodon
- Euchilichthys dybowskii
- Euchilichthys guentheri
- Euchilichthys royauxi
- Microsynodontis christyi
- Mochokiella paynei
- Mochokus brevis
- Mochokus niloticus
- Synodontis acanthomias
- Fischer's Victoria squeaker (Synodontis afrofischeri)
- Bigspotted squeaker (Synodontis alberti)
- Synodontis albolineatus
- Angel squeaker (Synodontis angelicus)
- Synodontis annectens
- Synodontis ansorgii
- Synodontis aterrimus
- Synodontis bastiani
- Nile catfish (Synodontis batensoda)
- Synodontis batesii
- Synodontis budgetti
- Synodontis caudalis
- Synodontis centralis
- Synodontis clarias
- Synodontis congicus
- Bugeye squeaker (Synodontis contractus)
- Synodontis courteti
- Clown squeaker (Synodontis decorus)
- Synodontis depauwi
- Synodontis dhonti
- Featherfin squeaker (Synodontis eupterus)
- Synodontis filamentosus
- Orangestriped squeaker (Synodontis flavitaeniatus)
- Sudan squeaker (Synodontis frontosus)
- Fuelleborn's squeaker (Synodontis fuelleborni)
- Synodontis geledensis
- Synodontis gobroni
- Synodontis granulosus
- Synodontis greshoffi
- Synodontis haugi
- Synodontis katangae
- Leopard squeaker (Synodontis leopardinus)
- Synodontis longirostris
- Largespot squeaker (Synodontis macrostigma)
- Largemouth squeaker (Synodontis macrostoma)
- Synodontis matthesi
- Synodontis membranaceus
- Synodontis multipunctatus
- Cloudy squeaker (Synodontis nebulosus)
- Synodontis nigrita
- Blotched upside-down catfish (Synodontis nigriventris)
- Blackspotted squeaker (Synodontis nigromaculatus)
- Malawi squeaker (Synodontis njassae)
- Onespot squeaker (Synodontis notatus)
- Synodontis nummifer
- Synodontis obesus
- Synodontis ocellifer
- Synodontis omias
- Synodontis ornatipinnis
- Synodontis ornatissimus
- Cuckoo catfish (Synodontis petricola)
- Congo squeaker (Synodontis pleurops)
- Synodontis polli
- Synodontis polyodon
- Synodontis polystigma
- Synodontis punctifer
- Synodontis resupinatus
- Ricardo's squeaker (Synodontis ricardoae)
- Synodontis rufigiensis
- Lake Rukwa squeaker (Synodontis rukwaensis)
- Wahrindi (Synodontis schall)
- Synodontis schoutedeni
- Synodontis serratus
- Synodontis smiti
- Synodontis soloni
- Synodontis sorex
- Synodontis steindachneri
- Synodontis tanganyicae
- Synodontis tessmanni
- Bubblebarb squeaker (Synodontis thamalakanensis)
- Synodontis thysi
- Synodontis unicolor
- Finetooth squeaker (Synodontis vanderwaali)
- Synodontis velifer
- Synodontis vermiculatus
- Synodontis violaceus
- Synodontis waterloti
- Upper Zambezi squeaker (Synodontis woosnami)
- Brown squeaker (Synodontis zambezensis)

==== Electric catfish species ====
- Malapterurus beninensis
- African electric catfish (Malapterurus electricus)
- Malapterurus melanochir
- Smallmouth electric catfish (Malapterurus microstoma)
- Malapterurus minjiriya
- Malapterurus oguensis
- Electric catfish (Malapterurus shirensis)
- Paradoxoglanis caudivittatus
- Paradoxoglanis parvus

==== Ariids ====
- Kukwari sea catfish (Amphiarius phrygiatus)
- Hardhead catfish (Ariopsis felis)
- Widehead sea catfish (Ariopsis guatemalensis)
- Tete sea catfish (Ariopsis seemanni)
- Arius acutirostris
- Threadfin sea catfish (Arius arius)
- Berney's catfish (Arius berneyi)
- Madagascar sea catfish (Arius madagascariensis)
- Coco sea catfish (Bagre bagre)
- Gafftopsail catfish (Bagre marinus)
- Chilhuil sea catfish (Bagre panamensis)
- Long-barbeled sea catfish (Bagre pinnimaculatus)
- Smoothmouth sea catfish (Carlarius heudelotii)
- Guinean sea catfish (Carlarius parkii)
- Yellow sea catfish (Cathorops arenatus)
- Big-bellied sea catfish (Cathorops dasycephalus)
- Higuchi's sea catfish (Cathorops higuchii)
- Gloomy sea catfish (Cathorops hypophthalmus)
- Box sea catfish (Cathorops multiradiatus)
- Cochlefelis burmanicus
- Peruvian sea catfish (Galeichthys peruvianus)
- Guri sea catfish (Genidens genidens)
- Broad-snouted catfish (Neoarius latirostris)
- Chomba sea-catfish (Notarius biffi)
- Thomas sea catfish (Notarius grandicassis)
- Sculptured sea catfish (Notarius kessleri)
- Thick-lip sea-catfish (Notarius planiceps)
- Bressou sea catfish (Notarius quadriscutis)
- Softhead sea catfish (Notarius rugispinis)
- Chilisea catfish (Notarius troschelii)
- Cominate sea catfish (Occidentarius platypogon)
- Blacktip sea catfish (Plicofollis dussumieri)
- Flatmouth catfish (Plicofollis platystomus)
- Couma sea catfish (Sciades couma)
- Brown sea catfish (Sciades dowii)
- Pemecou sea catfish (Sciades herzbergii)

==== Bagrids ====
- False black lancer (Bagrichthys obscurus)
- Bayad (Bagrus bajad)
- Sudan catfish (Bagrus docmak)
- Kampango (Bagrus meridionalis)
- Bagrus orientalis
- Bagrus ubangensis
- Batasio batasio
- Batasio fasciolatus
- Batasio fluviatilis
- Batasio tengana
- Chandramara chandramara
- Hemibagrus macropterus
- Krishna mystus (Hemibagrus maydelli)
- Hemibagrus menoda
- Hemibagrus microphthalmus
- Hemibagrus nemurus
- Hemibagrus peguensis
- Hemibagrus pluriradiatus
- Hemibagrus spilopterus
- Blacktail catfish (Hemibagrus wyckii)
- Asian red tailed catfish (Hemibagrus wyckioides)
- Mystus albolineatus
- Mystus armatus
- Mystus atrifasciatus
- Mystus bleekeri
- Mystus carcio
- Mystus castaneus
- Mystus cavasius
- Mystus dibrugarensis
- Mystus falcarius
- Mystus gulio
- Mystus keletius
- Mystus leucophasis
- Wynaad mystus (Mystus montanus)
- Mystus multiradiatus
- Mystus mysticetus
- Malabar mystus (Mystus oculatus)
- Zugzug catfish (Mystus pelusius)
- Mystus pulcher
- Mystus rufescens
- Mystus seengtee
- Mystus singaringan
- Mystus tengara
- Mystus vittatus
- Mystus wolffii
- Nanobagrus fuscus
- Pelteobagrus argentivittatus
- Braznikov's catfish (Pelteobagrus brashnikowi)
- Pseudobagrus ondon
- Pseudomystus leiacanthus
- Bumble bee catfish (Pseudomystus siamensis)
- Pseudomystus stenomus
- Mahanadi rita (Rita chrysea)
- Gogra rita (Rita gogra)
- Deccan rita (Rita kuturnee)
- Rita rita
- Salween rita (Rita sacerdotum)
- Sperata acicularis
- Long-whiskered catfish (Sperata aor)
- Sperata aorella
- Sperata seenghala
- Tachysurus adiposalis
- Tachysurus fulvidraco
- Tachysurus intermedius

==== Schilbeids ====
- Clupisoma garua
- Clupisoma montana
- Clupisoma prateri
- Clupisoma sinensis
- Eutropiichthys britzi
- Eutropiichthys burmannicus
- Eutropiichthys murius
- Eutropiichthys vacha
- Laides longibarbis
- Neotropius acutirostris
- Neotropius atherinoides
- Parailia congica
- Parailia occidentalis
- Glass schilbid (Parailia pellucida)
- Parailia spiniserrata
- Pareutropius buffei
- Pareutropius debauwi
- Pareutropius longifilis
- Pareutropius mandevillei
- Proeutropiichthys macropthalmos
- Indian taakree (Proeutropiichthys taakree)
- Golden barbel (Schilbe banguelensis)
- Schilbe bocagii
- Female belly up (Schilbe brevianalis)
- Schilbe congensis
- Schilbe djemeri
- Schilbe grenfelli
- Silver butter catfish (Schilbe intermedius)
- Schilbe laticeps
- Schilbe mandibularis
- Shoulderspot catfish (Schilbe marmoratus)
- Schilbe micropogon
- Schilbe moebiusii
- Schilbe multitaeniatus
- African butter catfish (Schilbe mystus)
- Schilbe tumbanus
- Egyptian butter catfish (Schilbe uranoscopus)
- Yangambi butterbarbel (Schilbe yangambianus)
- Silond catfish (Silonia silondia)
- Siluranodon auritus

==== Callichthyids ====
- Aspidoras maculosus
- Hognosed brochis (Brochis multiradiatus)
- Blacktop corydoras (Corydoras acutus)
- Adolfo's catfish (Corydoras adolfoi)
- Corydoras amphibelus
- Corydoras cervinus
- Corydoras copei
- Corydoras coppenamensis
- Corydoras coriatae
- Corydoras ehrhardti
- Corydoras fowleri
- Corydoras geryi
- Corydoras gracilis
- Corydoras lamberti
- False spotted catfish (Corydoras leucomelas)
- Loretoensi (Corydoras loretoensis)
- Bandit corydoras (Corydoras melini)
- Corydoras napoensis
- Corydoras ortegai
- Pastaza corydoras (Corydoras pastazensis)
- Corydoras stenocephalus
- Sychr's catfish (Corydoras sychri)
- Corydoras virginiae
- Weitzmani (Corydoras weitzmani)
- Corydoras zygatus
- Hoplosternum magdalenae
- Lepthoplosternum altamazonicum
- Lepthoplosternum beni

==== Doradids ====
- Amblydoras monitor
- Amblydoras nauticus
- Anadoras grypus
- Centrochir crocodili
- Ossancora fimbriata
- Rhinodoras boehlkei

==== Driftwood catfishes ====
- Auchenipterichthys coracoideus
- Auchenipterus britskii
- Auchenipterus nuchalis
- Centromochlus reticulatus
- Gelanoglanis stroudi
- Liosomadoras morrowi
- Jaguar catfish (Liosomadoras oncinus)
- Tatia aulopygia
- Trachelyichthys exilis
- Trachelyopterus albicrux
- Trachelyopterus fisheri
- Trachelyopterus insignis

==== Erethistids ====
- Erethistes pusillus
- Hara hara
- Hara horai
- Hara jerdoni
- Hara minuscula
- Pseudolaguvia kapuri
- Pseudolaguvia ribeiroi
- Pseudolaguvia shawi

==== Pseudopimelodids ====
- Batrochoglanis transmontanus
- Cephalosilurus fowleri
- Cruciglanis pacifici
- Microglanis zonatus
- Pseudopimelodus schultzi

==== Other catfish species ====
- Akysis hendricksoni
- Akysis prashadi
- Amblyceps apangi
- Amblyceps foratum
- Amblyceps laticeps
- Amblyceps mangois
- Ancharius fuscus
- Rock-catfish (Austroglanis sclateri)
- Gilded catfish (Brachyplatystoma rousseauxii)
- Guitarrita (Bunocephalus coracoideus)
- Banjo catfish (Bunocephalus knerii)
- Cetopsis amphiloxa
- Cetopsis montana
- Cetopsis othonops
- Cetopsis pearsoni
- Angler catfish (Chaca bankanensis)
- Chaca chaca
- Cranoglanis henrici
- Stinging catfish (Heteropneustes fossilis)
- Air-sac catfish (Heteropneustes kemratensis)
- Megalonema xanthum
- Olyra kempi
- Olyra longicaudata
- Singapore little warty catfish (Parakysis longirostris)
- Parapimelodus valenciennis
- Phreatobius cisternarum
- Pimelodus coprophagus
- Pseudobagarius similis
- Xyliphius magdalenae

=== Gonorynchiformes ===
Includes milkfish, beaked salmon and allies.

- Cromeria nilotica
- Beaked salmon (Gonorynchus gonorynchus)
- Angola Kneria (Kneria angolensis)
- Airbreathing shellear (Kneria auriculata)
- Kneria katangae
- Cunene Kneria (Kneria maydelli)
- Kneria paucisquamata
- Northern Kneria (Kneria polli)
- Kneria rukwaensis
- Kneria stappersii
- Kneria wittei
- Parakneria abbreviata
- Parakneria cameronensis
- Gorongoza Kneria (Parakneria mossambica)
- Parakneria spekii
- Hingemouth (Phractolaemus ansorgii)

=== Batrachoidiformes ===
- Bocon toadfish (Amphichthys cryptocentrus)
- Aphos porosus
- Large-eye toadfish (Batrachoides gilberti)
- Batrachoides liberiensis
- Cotuero toadfish (Batrachoides manglae)
- Pacific toadfish (Batrachoides pacifici)
- Pacuma toadfish (Batrachoides surinamensis)
- Multipored toadfish (Batrachoides waltersi)
- Dow's toadfish (Daector dowi)
- Lusitanian toadfish (Halobatrachus didactylus)
- Gulf toadfish (Opsanus beta)
- Bicolor toadfish (Opsanus dichrostomus)
- Leopard toadfish (Opsanus pardus)
- Scarecrow toadfish (Opsanus phobetron)
- Oyster toadfish (Opsanus tau)
- Perulibatrachus elminensis
- Perulibatrachus rossignoli
- Darkedge midshipman (Porichthys analis)
- Saddle midshipman (Porichthys ephippiatus)
- Greene's midshipman (Porichthys greenei)
- Daisy midshipman (Porichthys margaritatus)
- Mimetic midshipman (Porichthys mimeticus)
- Porichthys myriaster
- Plainfin midshipman (Porichthys notatus)
- Few-rayed toadfish (Porichthys pauciradiatus)
- Atlantic midshipman (Porichthys plectrodon)
- Bearded toadfish (Sanopus barbatus)
- Cano toadfish (Thalassophryne maculosa)
- Big-eyed toadfish (Thalassophryne megalops)
- Copper Joe toadfish (Thalassophryne nattereri)

=== Perciformes ===
There are 3878 species and 18 subspecies in the order Perciformes assessed as least concern.

=== Beloniformes ===
There are 74 species and seven subspecies in the order Beloniformes assessed as least concern.

==== Ricefishes ====
- Spotted ricefish (Oryzias carnaticus)
- Indian ricefish (Oryzias dancena)
- Mekong ricefish (Oryzias mekongensis)
- Oryzias melastigma
- Dwarf medaka (Oryzias minutillus)
- Miniature Indian ricefish (Oryzias setnai)
- Chinese rice fish (Oryzias sinensis)

==== Halfbeaks ====
- Hardhead halfbeak (Chriodorus atherinoides)
- Dermogenys burmanica
- Dermogenys siamensis
- Flying halfbeak (Euleptorhamphus velox)
- Balao halfbeak (Hemiramphus balao)
- Bermuda halfbeak (Hemiramphus bermudensis)
- Ballyhoo (Hemiramphus brasiliensis)
- Jumping halfbeak (Hemiramphus saltator)
- Forest halfbeak (Hemirhamphodon pogonognathus)
- Collette's halfbeak (Hyporhamphus collettei)
- Choelo halfbeak (Hyporhamphus gilli)
- Congaturi halfbeak (Hyporhamphus limbatus)
- American halfbeak (Hyporhamphus meeki)
- Pacific silverstripe halfbeak (Hyporhamphus naos)
- African halfbeak (Hyporhamphus picarti)
- Central American halfbeak (Hyporhamphus roberti)
- Skipper halfbeak (Hyporhamphus snyderi)
- Atlantic silverstripe halfbeak (Hyporhamphus unifasciatus)
- False halfbeak (Oxyporhamphus similis)
- Feathered river-garfish (Zenarchopterus dispar)
- Zenarchopterus gilli
- Robert's river garfish (Zenarchopterus robertsi)

==== Needlefishes ====
Species

- Flat needlefish (Ablennes hians)
- Garfish (Belone belone)
- Keeltail needlefish (Platybelone argalus)
- Californian needlefish (Strongylura exilis)
- Silver gar (Strongylura marina)
- Redfin needlefish (Strongylura notata)
- Shoulderspot needlefish (Strongylura scapularis)
- Strongylura senegalensis
- Timucu (Strongylura timucu)
- Agujon needlefish (Tylosurus acus)
- Houndfish (Tylosurus crocodilus)
- Pacific agujon (Tylosurus pacificus)
- Xenentodon cancila
- Indochinese needlefish (Xenentodon canciloides)

Subspecies

- Baja California keeltail needlefish (Platybelone argalus pterura)
- Tylosurus acus acus
- Tylosurus acus imperialis
- Tylosurus acus rafale
- Tylosurus crocodilus crocodilus
- Mexican needlefish (Tylosurus crocodilus fodiator)

==== Flying fish ====
Species

- Margined flyingfish (Cheilopogon cyanopterus)
- Backspot flying fish (Cheilopogon dorsomacula)
- Bandwing flyingfish (Cheilopogon exsiliens)
- Spotfin flyingfish (Cheilopogon furcatus)
- Blotchwing flyingfish (Cheilopogon heterurus)
- Atlantic flyingfish (Cheilopogon melanurus)
- Guinean flyingfish (Cheilopogon milleri)
- Blacksail flyingfish (Cheilopogon nigricans)
- Butterfly flyingfish (Cheilopogon papilio)
- Bennett's flyingfish (Cheilopogon pinnatibarbatus)
- Easter Island flyingfish (Cheilopogon rapanouiensis)
- Whitetip flyingfish (Cheilopogon xenopterus)
- Ornamented flying fish (Cypselurus callopterus)
- Clearwing flyingfish (Cypselurus comatus)
- Oceanic two-wing flyingfish (Exocoetus obtusirostris)
- Tropical two-wing flyingfish (Exocoetus volitans)
- Fodiator acutus
- Fodiator rostratus
- Hirundichthys affinis
- Banded flyingfish (Hirundichthys marginatus)
- Subtropical flyingfish (Hirundichthys rondeletii)
- Mirrorwing flyingfish (Hirundichthys speculiger)
- Hirundichthys volador
- Atlantic sailfin flyingfish (Parexocoetus hillianus)
- Bluntnosed flyingfish (Prognichthys gibbifrons)
- Gyre flyingfish (Prognichthys glaphyrae)
- Western bluntnose flyingfish (Prognichthys occidentalis)
- Sailor flyingfish (Prognichthys sealei)
- Tringa flyingfish (Prognichthys tringa)

Subspecies

- California flying fish (Cheilopogon pinnatibarbatus californicus)

==== Scomberesocids ====
- Atlantic saury (Scomberesox saurus)
- Dwarf Atlantic saury (Scomberesox simulans)

==== Snakeheads ====
- Northern snakehead (Channa argus)
- Small snakehead (Channa asiatica)
- Forest snakehead (Channa lucius)
- Blotched snakehead (Channa maculata)
- Black snakehead (Channa melasoma)
- Giant snakehead (Channa micropeltes)
- Spotted snakehead (Channa punctata)
- Striped snakehead (Channa striata)

=== Synbranchiformes ===
There are 52 species in the order Synbranchiformes assessed as least concern.

==== Swamp eels ====
- Asian swamp eel (Monopterus albus)
- Gangetic mudeel (Monopterus cuchia)
- Bengal mudeel (Ophisternon bengalense)

==== Mastacembelids ====
- Macrognathus aral
- Macrognathus circumcinctus
- Macrognathus dorsiocellatus
- Macrognathus guentheri
- Macrognathus maculatus
- Macrognathus morehensis
- Macrognathus pancalus
- Macrognathus semiocellatus
- Spotfin spiny eel (Macrognathus siamensis)
- Tapir spiny eel (Macrognathus tapirus)
- Macrognathus zebrinus
- Mastacembelus alboguttatus
- Mastacembelus albomaculatus
- Tire track eel (Mastacembelus armatus)
- Mastacembelus brachyrhinus
- Blind spiny eel (Mastacembelus brichardi)
- Mastacembelus congicus
- Mastacembelus cryptacanthus
- Mastacembelus cunningtoni
- Mastacembelus dayi
- Mastacembelus ellipsifer
- Fire eel (Mastacembelus erythrotaenia)
- Flower spiny eel (Mastacembelus favus)
- Mastacembelus flavidus
- East African spiny eel (Mastacembelus frenatus)
- Mastacembelus greshoffi
- Mastacembelus liberiensis
- Mesopotamian spiny eel (Mastacembelus mastacembelus)
- Mastacembelus micropectus
- Mastacembelus moeruensis
- Mastacembelus moorii
- Mastacembelus niger
- Mastacembelus nigromarginatus
- Mastacembelus ophidium
- Mastacembelus paucispinis
- Mastacembelus plagiostomus
- Mastacembelus platysoma
- Mastacembelus praensis
- Mastacembelus robertsi
- Mastacembelus sanagali
- Mastacembelus seiteri
- Malawi spinyeel (Mastacembelus shiranus)
- Mastacembelus stappersii
- Mastacembelus tanganicae
- Mastacembelus tinwini
- Mastacembelus traversi
- Ocellated spiny eel (Mastacembelus vanderwaali)
- Zebra spinyeel (Mastacembelus zebratus)
- Sinobdella sinensis

=== Gymnotiformes ===
- Apteronotus eschmeyeri
- Apteronotus magdalenensis
- Apteronotus mariae
- Distocyclus conirostris
- Electric eel (Electrophorus electricus)
- Gymnotus chaviro
- Gymnotus esmeraldas
- Gymnotus jonasi
- Hypopygus ortegai
- Platyurosternarchus macrostomus
- Barred knifefish (Steatogenys elegans)
- Sternarchorhynchus hagedornae
- Sternarchorhynchus montanus
- Sternarchorhynchus mormyrus
- Sternarchorhynchus stewarti
- Sternarchorhynchus taphorni
- Blue-green knifefish (Sternopygus aequilabiatus)

=== Osteoglossiformes ===
There are 127 species in the order Osteoglossiformes assessed as least concern.

==== Mormyrids ====
- Boulengeromyrus knoepffleri
- Brevimyrus niger
- Brienomyrus brachyistius
- Brienomyrus longianalis
- Campylomormyrus alces
- Campylomormyrus christyi
- Campylomormyrus curvirostris
- Campylomormyrus elephas
- Campylomormyrus mirus
- Campylomormyrus numenius
- Campylomormyrus phantasticus
- Campylomormyrus rhynchophorus
- Wormjawed mormyrid (Campylomormyrus tamandua)
- Campylomormyrus tshokwe
- Zambezi parrotfish (Cyphomyrus discorhynchus)
- Cyphomyrus macrops
- Cyphomyrus psittacus
- Cyphomyrus wilverthi
- Genyomyrus donnyi
- Gnathonemus echidnorhynchus
- Longnose stonebasher (Gnathonemus longibarbis)
- Peters' elephantnose fish (Gnathonemus petersii)
- Slender stonebasher (Hippopotamyrus ansorgii)
- Hippopotamyrus castor
- Graham's stonebasher (Hippopotamyrus grahami)
- Hippopotamyrus pappenheimi
- Hippopotamyrus paugyi
- Hippopotamyrus pictus
- Hippopotamyrus szaboi
- Hyperopisus bebe
- Isichthys henryi
- Ivindomyrus marchei
- Marcusenius altisambesi
- Marcusenius angolensis
- Thisk-lipped fish (Marcusenius cyprinoides)
- Marcusenius friteli
- Marcusenius fuscus
- Marcusenius ghesquierei
- Marcusenius greshoffii
- Marcusenius kutuensis
- Marcusenius leopoldianus
- Livingstone's bulldog (Marcusenius livingstonii)
- Bulldog-fish (Marcusenius macrolepidotus)
- Marcusenius mento
- Monteiri's bulldog (Marcusenius monteiri)
- Marcusenius moorii
- Marcusenius schilthuisiae
- Marcusenius senegalensis
- Marcusenius stanleyanus
- Marcusenius thomasi
- Marcusenius ussheri
- Cornish jack (Mormyrops anguilloides)
- Mormyrops attenuatus
- Mormyrops boulengeri
- Mormyrops breviceps
- Mormyrops curtus
- Mormyrops engystoma
- Mormyrops furcidens
- Mormyrops lineolatus
- Mormyrops mariae
- Mormyrops masuianus
- Mormyrops nigricans
- Mormyrops sirenoides
- Mormyrops zanclirostris
- Mormyrus caschive
- Mormyrus hasselquistii
- Bottlenose (Mormyrus kannume)
- Western bottlenose (Mormyrus lacerda)
- Eastern bottlenose mormyrid (Mormyrus longirostris)
- Mormyrus macrocephalus
- Mormyrus macrophthalmus
- Mormyrus ovis
- Mormyrus tapirus
- Athi elephant-snout fish (Mormyrus tenuirostris)
- Myomyrus macrodon
- Myomyrus macrops
- Paramormyrops curvifrons
- Paramormyrops sphekodes
- Paramormyrops tavernei
- Petrocephalus ansorgii
- Petrocephalus balayi
- Petrocephalus binotatus
- Petrocephalus christyi
- Petrocephalus grandoculis
- Petrocephalus microphthalmus
- Petrocephalus pallidomaculatus
- Petrocephalus pellegrini
- Petrocephalus sauvagii
- Petrocephalus schoutedeni
- Petrocephalus simus
- Petrocephalus soudanensis
- Petrocephalus sullivani
- Petrocephalus tenuicauda
- Southern churchill (Petrocephalus wesselsi)
- Pollimyrus adspersus
- Pollimyrus brevis
- Dwarf stonebasher (Pollimyrus castelnaui)
- Pollimyrus marianne
- Dark stonebasher (Pollimyrus nigricans)
- Pollimyrus nigripinnis
- Pollimyrus petherici
- Pollimyrus petricolus
- Pollimyrus plagiostoma
- Pollimyrus pulverulentus
- Pollimyrus schreyeni
- Pollimyrus tumifrons
- Stomatorhinus corneti
- Stomatorhinus fuliginosus
- Stomatorhinus humilior
- Stomatorhinus kununguensis
- Stomatorhinus patrizii
- Stomatorhinus polli
- Stomatorhinus polylepis
- Stomatorhinus puncticulatus
- Stomatorhinus walkeri

==== Notopterids ====
- Giant featherback (Chitala lopis)
- Clown featherback (Chitala ornata)
- Bronze featherback (Notopterus notopterus)
- Feather back (Papyrocranus afer)
- Papyrocranus congoensis
- African brown knifefish (Xenomystus nigri)

==== Other Osteoglossiformes species ====
- Aba (Gymnarchus niloticus)
- African arowana (Heterotis niloticus)
- Goldeye (Hiodon alosoides)
- Mooneye (Hiodon tergisus)
- Black arowana (Osteoglossum ferreirai)
- Freshwater butterflyfish (Pantodon buchholzi)

=== Gobiesociformes ===
- Flarenostril clingfish (Acyrtops amplicirrus)
- Emerald clingfish (Acyrtops beryllinus)
- Papillate clingfish (Acyrtus artius)
- Orange-spotted clingfish (Acyrtus lanthanum)
- Red clingfish (Acyrtus rubiginosus)
- Apletodon bacescui
- Apletodon incognitus
- Chubby clingfish (Apletodon pellegrini)
- Apletodon wirtzi
- Elegant clingfish (Arcos decoris)
- Rockwall clingfish (Arcos erythrops)
- Padded clingfish (Arcos nudus)
- Rock clingfish (Arcos rhodospilus)
- High-forehead clingfish (Derilissus altifrons)
- Two-spotted clingfish (Diplecogaster bimaculata)
- Diplecogaster ctenocrypta
- Panamic clingfish (Gobiesox adustus)
- Lappetlip clingfish (Gobiesox barbatulus)
- Dotted clingfish (Gobiesox daedaleus)
- Bahama skilletfish (Gobiesox lucayanus)
- Blackfinned clingfish (Gobiesox nigripinnis)
- Bearded clingfish (Gobiesox papillifer)
- Gobiesox pinniger
- Stippled clingfish (Gobiesox punctulatus)
- Smoothlip clingfish (Gobiesox schultzi)
- Skilletfish (Gobiesox strumosus)
- Blunt-snouted clingfish (Gouania willdenowi)
- Lecanogaster chrysea
- Shore clingfish (Lepadogaster lepadogaster)
- Lepadogaster purpurea
- Opeatogenys gracilis
- Northern fraildisc clingfish (Pherallodiscus funebris)
- Guadalupe clingfish (Rimicola sila)
- Sicyases hildebrandi
- Tomicodon australis
- Cortez clingfish (Tomicodon boehlkei)
- Broadhead clingfish (Tomicodon briggsi)
- Smallsucker clingfish (Tomicodon chilensis)
- Cryptic clingfish (Tomicodon cryptus)
- Rosy clingfish (Tomicodon eos)
- Barred clingfish (Tomicodon fasciatus)
- Sonora clingfish (Tomicodon humeralis)
- Smooth-suckered clingfish (Tomicodon leurodiscus)
- Blackstripe clingfish (Tomicodon myersi)
- Peter's clingfish (Tomicodon petersii)
- Reitz's clingfish (Tomicodon reitzae)
- Antillean clingfish (Tomicodon rhabdotus)
- Surge clingfish (Tomicodon rupestris)
- Zebra clingfish (Tomicodon zebra)

=== Characiformes ===
There are 354 species in the order Characiformes assessed as least concern.

==== Bryconids ====
- Brycon amazonicus
- Brycon dentex
- Brycon henni
- Brycon meeki
- Brycon oligolepis
- Brycon polylepis
- Brycon rubricauda
- Brycon sinuensis
- Brycon stolzmanni

==== Curimatids ====
- Curimata incompta
- Curimata vittata
- Cyphocharax derhami
- Cyphocharax pantostictos
- Cyphocharax voga
- Pseudocurimata lineopunctata
- Steindachnerina amazonica
- Steindachnerina binotata

==== Alestids ====
- Alestes ansorgii
- Alestes baremoze
- Nile robber (Alestes dentex)
- Alestes liebrechtsii
- Torpedo robber (Alestes macrophthalmus)
- Alestes stuhlmannii
- Alestopetersius bifasciatus
- Alestopetersius brichardi
- Yellow-tailed African tetra (Alestopetersius caudalis)
- Alestopetersius compressus
- Alestopetersius hilgendorfi
- Alestopetersius leopoldianus
- Alestopetersius tumbensis
- Bathyaethiops breuseghemi
- African moon tetra (Bathyaethiops caudomaculatus)
- Bathyaethiops greeni
- Victoria robber (Brachyalestes jacksonii)
- Brachyalestes peringueyi
- Brachypetersius cadwaladeri
- Brachypetersius gabonensis
- Brachypetersius huloti
- Brachypetersius pseudonummifer
- Redfin robber (Brycinus affinis)
- Brycinus bimaculatus
- Large-toothed Lake Turkana robber (Brycinus ferox)
- Brycinus fwaensis
- Pinkfin alestes (Brycinus grandisquamis)
- Spot-tail robber (Brycinus imberi)
- Brycinus intermedius
- Brycinus kingsleyae
- Striped robber (Brycinus lateralis)
- Brycinus leuciscus
- African longfin (Brycinus longipinnis)
- Large scaled robber (Brycinus macrolepidotus)
- Dwarf Lake Turkana robber (Brycinus minutus)
- Nurse tetra (Brycinus nurse)
- Brycinus opisthotaenia
- Brycinus poptae
- Brycinus rhodopleura
- Sadler's robber (Brycinus sadleri)
- Brycinus taeniurus
- Brycinus tholloni
- Bryconaethiops boulengeri
- Bryconaethiops macrops
- Bryconaethiops microstoma
- Bryconaethiops quinquesquamae
- Barnard's robber (Hemigrammopetersius barnardi)
- Hydrocynus brevis
- Elongate tigerfish (Hydrocynus forskahlii)
- Giant tigerfish (Hydrocynus goliath)
- Hydrocynus tanzaniae
- Ndweshi (Hydrocynus vittatus)
- Sharptooth tetra (Micralestes acutidens)
- Micralestes argyrotaenia
- Micralestes congicus
- Micralestes fodori
- Micralestes humilis
- Micralestes lualabae
- Micralestes occidentalis
- Micralestes pabrensis
- Micralestes sardina
- Micralestes stormsi
- Nannopetersius lamberti
- Petersius conserialis
- Phenacogrammus altus
- Phenacogrammus ansorgii
- Phenacogrammus aurantiacus
- Phenacogrammus deheyni
- Congo tetra (Phenacogrammus interruptus)
- Phenacogrammus major
- Phenacogrammus polli
- Phenacogrammus urotaenia
- Rhabdalestes brevidorsalis
- Okavango robber (Rhabdalestes maunensis)
- Rhabdalestes rhodesiensis
- Rhabdalestes septentrionalis
- Pangani robber (Rhabdalestes tangensis)
- Tricuspidalestes caeruleus

==== Lebiasinids ====
- Blackband copella (Copella nigrofasciata)
- Lebiasina astrigata
- Lebiasina chucuriensis
- Lebiasina colombia
- Lebiasina elongata
- Lebiasina floridablancaensis
- Lebiasina multimaculata
- Lebiasina ortegai
- Pyrrhulina eleanorae
- Copeina (Pyrrhulina spilota)

==== Distichodontids ====
- Belonophago hutsebouti
- Belonophago tinanti
- Congocharax olbrechtsi
- Silver distichodus (Distichodus affinis)
- Distichodus altus
- Distichodus antonii
- Distichodus atroventralis
- Distichodus brevipinnis
- Dwarf distichodus (Distichodus decemmaculatus)
- Grass-eaters (Distichodus engycephalus)
- Many barred distichodus (Distichodus fasciolatus)
- Distichodus hypostomatus
- Distichodus kolleri
- Longsnout distichodus (Distichodus lusosso)
- Spotted citharinid (Distichodus maculatus)
- Nkupe (Distichodus mossambicus)
- Nile distichodus (Distichodus niloticus)
- Distichodus noboli
- Distichodus notospilus
- Distichodus rostratus
- Distichodus rufigiensis
- Distichodus schenga
- Six-banded distichodus (Distichodus sexfasciatus)
- Eugnathichthys eetveldii
- Eugnathichthys macroterolepis
- Hemigrammocharax angolensis
- Dwarf citharine (Hemigrammocharax machadoi)
- Hemigrammocharax minutus
- Hemigrammocharax monardi
- Multibar citharine (Hemigrammocharax multifasciatus)
- Hemigrammocharax ocellicauda
- Hemigrammocharax uniocellatus
- Hemigrammocharax wittei
- Hemistichodus lootensi
- Hemistichodus mesmaekersi
- Hemistichodus vaillanti
- Ichthyborus monodi
- Ichthyborus ornatus
- Mesoborus crocodilus
- Microstomatichthyoborus bashforddeani
- Microstomatichthyoborus katangae
- Oneline tetra (Nannaethiops unitaeniatus)
- Nannocharax ansorgii
- Nannocharax brevis
- Nannocharax elongatus
- Nannocharax fasciatus
- Nannocharax gracilis
- Nannocharax intermedius
- Nannocharax lineomaculatus
- Nannocharax luapulae
- Broad-barred citharine (Nannocharax macropterus)
- Nannocharax maculicauda
- Nannocharax niloticus
- Nannocharax occidentalis
- Nannocharax parvus
- Nannocharax procatopus
- Nannocharax schoutedeni
- Nannocharax taenia
- Neolebias ansorgii
- Neolebias gossei
- Neolebias trewavasae
- Threeline tetra (Neolebias trilineatus)
- Neolebias unifasciatus
- Paradistichodus dimidiatus
- Phago boulengeri
- Phago intermedius
- African pike-characin (Phago loricatus)
- Xenocharax crassus

==== Characids ====
- Acestrocephalus boehlkei
- Argopleura chocoensis
- Argopleura diquensis
- Argopleura magdalenensis
- Astyanacinus multidens
- Astyanax atratoensis
- Astyanax caucanus
- Astyanax filiferus
- Astyanax guaporensis
- Mexican tetra (Astyanax mexicanus)
- Astyanax microlepis
- Astyanax orthodus
- Attonitus ephimeros
- Attonitus irisae
- Brachychalcinus nummus
- Bryconacidnus ellisi
- Bryconacidnus paipayensis
- Bryconamericus alfredae
- Bryconamericus andresoi
- Bryconamericus bolivianus
- Bryconamericus caucanus
- Bryconamericus dahli
- Bryconamericus deuterodonoides
- Bryconamericus diaphanus
- Bryconamericus emperador
- Bryconamericus galvisi
- Bryconamericus grosvenori
- Bryconamericus guaytarae
- Bryconamericus huilae
- Bryconamericus osgoodi
- Bryconamericus pachacuti
- Bryconamericus pectinatus
- Bryconamericus phoenicopterus
- Bryconamericus plutarcoi
- Bryconamericus zamorensis
- Ceratobranchia binghami
- Ceratobranchia delotaenia
- Ceratobranchia obtusirostris
- Charax macrolepis
- Charax tectifer
- Cheirodon ortegai
- Chrysobrycon hesperus
- Chrysobrycon myersi
- Creagrutus amoenus
- Creagrutus brevipinnis
- Creagrutus britskii
- Creagrutus caucanus
- Creagrutus changae
- Creagrutus flavescens
- Creagrutus gephyrus
- Creagrutus gracilis
- Creagrutus guanes
- Creagrutus holmi
- Creagrutus kunturus
- Creagrutus magdalenae
- Creagrutus manu
- Creagrutus maracaiboensis
- Creagrutus muelleri
- Creagrutus ortegai
- Creagrutus ouranonastes
- Creagrutus paralacus
- Creagrutus pearsoni
- Creagrutus peruanus
- Creagrutus pila
- Creagrutus ungulus
- Deuterodon singularis
- Tetra (Diapoma terofali)
- Gephyrocharax chocoensis
- Gephyrocharax major
- Gephyrocharax melanocheir
- Grundulus bogotensis
- Hemibrycon beni
- Hemibrycon boquiae
- Hemibrycon colombianus
- Hemibrycon dentatus
- Hemibrycon helleri
- Hemibrycon huambonicus
- Hemibrycon mikrostiktos
- Hemibrycon orcesi
- Hemibrycon palomae
- Hemibrycon polyodon
- Hemibrycon rafaelense
- Jumping anchovy (Hemibrycon tridens)
- Costello tetra (Hemigrammus hyanuary)
- Hemigrammus luelingi
- Black wedge tetra (Hemigrammus pulcher)
- Ornate tetra (Hyphessobrycon bentosi)
- Hyphessobrycon frankei
- Hyphessobrycon gracilior
- Hyphessobrycon loretoensis
- Black phantom tetra (Hyphessobrycon megalopterus)
- Hyphessobrycon ocasoensis
- Hyphessobrycon oritoensis
- Hyphessobrycon pando
- Hyphessobrycon peruvianus
- Hyphessobrycon proteus
- Lemon tetra (Hyphessobrycon pulchripinnis)
- Hyphessobrycon robustulus
- Hyphessobrycon taguae
- Hyphessobrycon tenuis
- Tortuguero tetra (Hyphessobrycon tortuguerae)
- Jupiaba poranga
- Knodus gamma
- Knodus hypopterus
- Knodus megalops
- Knodus pasco
- Lobodeuterodon euspilurus
- Microgenys minuta
- Microschemobrycon elongatus
- Moenkhausia atahualpiana
- Moenkhausia georgiae
- Moenkhausia ovalis
- Moenkhausia simulata
- Monotocheirodon pearsoni
- Odontostilbe dierythrura
- Odontostilbe ecuadorensis
- Odontostilbe microcephala
- Oligosarcus bolivianus
- Oligosarcus longirostris
- Othonocheirodus eigenmanni
- Phenacogaster beni
- Priocharax pygmaeus
- Pseudochalceus lineatus
- Rhoadsia minor
- Roeboides affinis
- Roeboides bonariensis
- Roeboides occidentalis
- Saccoderma hastata
- Saccoderma robusta
- Scopaeocharax atopodus
- Scopaeocharax rhinodus
- Tyttobrycon dorsimaculatus
- Tyttobrycon spinosus
- Tyttocharax tambopatensis
- Xenurobrycon heterodon
- Xenurobrycon polyancistrus

==== Citharinids ====
- Citharidium ansorgii
- Citharinus congicus
- Citharinus gibbosus
- Citharinus latus
- Citharinus macrolepis

==== Anostomids ====
- Abramites eques
- Anostomus anostomus
- Anostomus longus
- Anostomus ternetzi
- Laemolyta fasciata
- Leporinus crassilabris
- Leporinus granti
- Leporinus niceforoi
- Leporinus nijsseni
- Leporinus obtusidens
- Leporinus pearsoni
- Striped leporinus (Leporinus striatus)
- Leporinus wolfei
- Leporinus y-ophorus
- Rhytiodus lauzannei
- Schizodon rostratus

==== Crenuchids ====
- Characidium bolivianum
- Characidium brevirostre
- Characidium caucanum
- Characidium lanei
- Characidium phoxocephalum
- Characidium pteroides
- Characidium purpuratum
- Characidium schubarti
- Geryichthys sterbai
- Melanocharacidium rex
- Microcharacidium geryi

==== Other Characiformes species ====
- Acestrorhynchus maculipinna
- Bivibranchia simulata
- Boulengerella xyrekes
- Bryconops colaroja
- Bryconops gracilis
- Bryconops imitator
- Gilbertolus alatus
- Gilbertolus atratoensis
- Hemiodus amazonum
- Kafue pike (Hepsetus odoe)
- Parodon caliensis
- Parodon magdalenensis
- Piabucus caudomaculatus
- Silver prochilodus (Semaprochilodus taeniurus)
- Serrasalmus odyssei
- Sharp-snouted piranha (Serrasalmus sanchezi)
- Triportheus magdalenae
- Triportheus rotundatus

=== Syngnathiformes ===
Syngnathiformes includes the pipefishes and seahorses. There are 102 species and one subspecies in the order Syngnathiformes assessed as least concern.

==== Syngnathids ====
Species

- West Atlantic pygmy pipehorse (Acentronura dendritica)
- Shortpouch pygmy pipehorse (Acentronura tentaculata)
- Fringed pipefish (Anarchopterus criniger)
- Insular pipefish (Anarchopterus tectus)
- Naked pipefish (Bhanotia nuda)
- Pink pipefish (Bryx analicarens)
- American pugnose pipefish (Bryx dunckeri)
- Ocellated pipefish (Bryx randalli)
- Short-bodied pipefish (Choeroichthys brachysoma)
- Brown-banded pipefish (Corythoichthys amplexus)
- Benedetto's pipefish (Corythoichthys benedetto)
- Messmate pipefish (Corythoichthys haematopterus)
- White-nose pipefish (Cosmocampus albirostris)
- Snubnose pipefish (Cosmocampus arctus)
- American crested pipefish (Cosmocampus brachycephalus)
- Short-fin pipefish (Cosmocampus elucens)
- American dwarf pipefish (Cosmocampus hildebrandi)
- Lord Howe pipefish (Cosmocampus howensis)
- Investigator pipefish (Cosmocampus investigatoris)
- Maxweber's pipefish (Cosmocampus maxweberi)
- Doryichthys boaja
- Pygmy pipefish (Doryichthys contiguus)
- Doryichthys deokhatoides
- Doryichthys martensii
- Bluestripe pipefish (Doryrhamphus excisus)
- Janss' pipefish (Doryrhamphus janssi)
- Enneacampus ansorgii
- Enneacampus kaupi
- Snake pipefish (Entelurus aequoreus)
- Tiger pipefish (Filicampus tigris)
- Booth's pipefish (Halicampus boothae)
- Brock's pipefish (Halicampus brocki)
- Nose-ridge pipefish (Halicampus dunckeri)
- Edmondson's pipefish (Halicampus edmondsoni)
- Gray's pipefish (Halicampus grayi)
- Reticulated freshwater pipefish (Hippichthys heptagonus)
- Beady pipefish (Hippichthys penicillus)
- Bellybarred pipefish (Hippichthys spicifer)
- Hippocampus planifrons
- Shiho's seahorse (Hippocampus sindonis)
- Briggs' pipefish (Histiogamphelus briggsii)
- Macleay's crested pipefish (Histiogamphelus cristatus)
- Ichthyocampus carce
- Trawl pipefish (Kimblaeus bassensis)
- Thread pipefish (Kyonemichthys rumengani)
- Australian smooth pipefish (Lissocampus caudalis)
- Prophet's pipefish (Lissocampus fatiloquus)
- Shortsnout pipefish (Lissocampus filum)
- Sawtooth pipefish (Maroubra perserrata)
- Harlequin pipefish (Micrognathus crinitus)
- Short-tailed pipefish (Microphis brachyurus)
- Crocodile-tooth pipefish (Microphis cuncalus)
- Microphis dunckeri
- Barhead pipefish (Microphis leiaspis)
- Manado pipefish (Microphis manadensis)
- Red pipefish (Microphis mento)
- Ragged-tail pipefish (Microphis retzii)
- Worm pipefish (Nerophis lumbriciformis)
- Straightnose pipefish (Nerophis ophidion)
- Finless pipefish (Penetopteryx nanus)
- Rock pipefish (Phoxocampus belcheri)
- Obscure pipefish (Phoxocampus diacanthus)
- Trunk-barred pipefish (Phoxocampus tetrophthalmus)
- Pseudophallus elcapitanensis
- Yellowbelly pipefish (Pseudophallus starksii)
- Pug-nosed pipefish (Pugnaso curtirostris)
- Mushroom-coral pipefish (Siokunichthys nigrolineatus)
- Black-striped pipefish (Syngnathus abaster)
- Greater pipefish (Syngnathus acus)
- Barred pipefish (Syngnathus auliscus)
- Kelp pipefish (Syngnathus californiensis)
- Caribbean pipefish (Syngnathus caribbaeus)
- Barcheek pipefish (Syngnathus exilis)
- Dusky pipefish (Syngnathus floridae)
- Southern pipefish (Syngnathus folletti)
- Northern pipefish (Syngnathus fuscus)
- Guadalupe pipefish (Syngnathus insulae)
- Bay pipefish (Syngnathus leptorhynchus)
- Sargassum pipefish (Syngnathus pelagicus)
- Lesser pipefish (Syngnathus rostellatus)
- Pacific seaweed pipefish (Syngnathus schlegeli)
- Gulf pipefish (Syngnathus scovelli)
- Bull pipefish (Syngnathus springeri)
- Broadnosed pipefish (Syngnathus typhle)
- Trachyrhamphus bicoarctatus
- Long-head pipefish (Trachyrhamphus longirostris)
- Mother-of-pearl pipefish (Vanacampus margaritifer)
- Port Phillip pipefish (Vanacampus phillipi)
- Australian long-nosed pipefish (Vanacampus poecilolaemus)

Subspecies

- Black-sided pipefish (Doryrhamphus excisus excisus)

==== Centriscids ====
- Banded bellowsfish (Centriscops humerosus)
- Grooved razorfish (Centriscus scutatus)
- Longspine snipefish (Macroramphosus scolopax)
- Notopogon armatus
- Orange bellowsfish (Notopogon fernandezianus)
- Crested bellowsfish (Notopogon lilliei)
- Longsnout bellowfish (Notopogon macrosolen)
- Longspine bellowsfish (Notopogon xenosoma)

==== Aulostomids ====
- Chinese trumpetfish (Aulostomus chinensis)
- Trumpetfish (Aulostomus maculatus)
- Atlantic trumpetfish (Aulostomus strigosus)

==== Cornetfishes ====
- Deepwater cornetfish (Fistularia corneta)
- Red cornetfish (Fistularia petimba)
- Blue-spotted cornetfish (Fistularia tabacaria)

==== Sea moths ====
- Little dragonfish (Eurypegasus draconis)
- Hawaiian sea-moth fish (Eurypegasus papilio)
- Sculptured dragonfish (Pegasus lancifer)

=== Clupeiformes ===
There are 143 species and one subspecies in the order Clupeiformes assessed as least concern.

==== Clupeids ====
Species

- Alosa agone
- Allis shad (Alosa alosa)
- Alosa caspia
- Skipjack shad (Alosa chrysochloris)
- Twait shad (Alosa fallax)
- Alosa kessleri
- Alosa maeotica
- Hickory shad (Alosa mediocris)
- Alewife (Alosa pseudoharengus)
- American shad (Alosa sapidissima)
- Alosa tanaica
- Thai gizzard shad (Anodontostoma thailandiae)
- Finescale menhaden (Brevoortia gunteri)
- Gulf menhaden (Brevoortia patronus)
- Yellowfin menhaden (Brevoortia smithi)
- Atlantic menhaden (Brevoortia tyrannus)
- Atlantic herring (Clupea harengus)
- Thai river sprat (Clupeichthys aesarnensis)
- Sumatran river sprat (Clupeichthys goniognathus)
- Perak river sprat (Clupeichthys perakensis)
- Borneo river sprat (Clupeoides borneensis)
- Caspian tyulka (Clupeonella caspia)
- Black Sea sprat (Clupeonella cultriventris)
- Freshwater tyulka (Clupeonella tscharchalensis)
- Corica soborna
- Day's round herring (Dayella malabarica)
- American gizzard shad (Dorosoma cepedianum)
- Threadfin shad (Dorosoma petenense)
- Bonga (Ethmalosa fimbriata)
- West Atlantic round herring (Etrumeus sadina)
- Whitehead's round herring (Etrumeus whiteheadi)
- Estuarine round herring (Gilchristella aestuaria)
- Gonialosa manmina
- Burmese river gizzard shad (Gonialosa modesta)
- Gudusia chapra
- Gudusia variegata
- False herring (Harengula clupeola)
- Redear herring (Harengula humeralis)
- Scaled sardine (Harengula jaguana)
- Pacific flatiron herring (Harengula thrissina)
- Dwarf round herring (Jenkinsia lamprotaenia)
- Little-eye round herring (Jenkinsia majua)
- Florida round herring (Jenkinsia stolifera)
- Roundbelly pellonuline (Laeviscutella dekimpei)
- Graceful piquitinga (Lile gracilis)
- Blackstripe herring (Lile nigrofasciata)
- Atlantic piquitinga (Lile piquitinga)
- Pacific piquitinga (Lile stolifera)
- Lake Tanganyika sardine (Limnothrissa miodon)
- Royal sprat (Microthrissa royauxi)
- Microthrissa whiteheadi
- Minyclupeoides dentibranchialus
- Lake Tumba dwarf sprat (Nannothrissa parva)
- Galathea gizzard shad (Nematalosa galatheae)
- Bloch's gizzard shad (Nematalosa nasus)
- Ansorge's fangtooth pellonuline (Odaxothrissa ansorgii)
- Losera fangtooth pellonuline (Odaxothrissa losera)
- Nigerian fangtooth pellonuline (Odaxothrissa mento)
- Slender thread herring (Opisthonema bulleri)
- Deep-bodied Pacific thread herring (Opisthonema libertate)
- Middling thread herring (Opisthonema medirastre)
- Atlantic thread herring (Opisthonema oglinum)
- Smalltoothed pellonula (Pellonula leonensis)
- Bigtoothed pellonula (Pellonula vorax)
- Yellowfin herring (Pliosteostoma lutipinnis)
- Central Zaire pellonuline (Poecilothrissa centralis)
- Bigscale pellonuline (Poecilothrissa congica)
- Sharpnosed sawtooth pellonuline (Potamothrissa acutirostris)
- Bluntnosed sawtooth pellonuline (Potamothrissa obtusirostris)
- Uruguay river sprat (Ramnogaster melanostoma)
- European pilchard (Sardina pilchardus)
- White sardinella (Sardinella albella)
- Round sardinella (Sardinella aurita)
- Fiji sardinella (Sardinella fijiense)
- Indian oil sardine (Sardinella longiceps)
- Sauvagella madagascariensis
- West African pygmy herring (Sierrathrissa leonensis)
- Silver-stripe round herring (Spratelloides gracilis)
- Lake Tanganyika sprat (Stolothrissa tanganicae)
- Ilish (Tenualosa ilisha)

Subspecies

- Peruvian Pacific sardine (Sardinops sagax sagax)

==== Pristigasterids ====
- Dogtooth herring (Chirocentrodon bleekerianus)
- Ilisha africana
- Amazon ilisha (Ilisha amazonica)
- Ilisha compressa
- Hatchet herring (Ilisha fuerthii)
- Ilisha novacula
- Tropical longfin herring (Neoopisthopterus tropicus)
- Caribbean longfin herring (Odontognathus compressus)
- Guiana longfin herring (Odontognathus mucronatus)
- Panama longfin herring (Odontognathus panamensis)
- Dove's longfin herring (Opisthopterus dovii)
- Equatorial longfin herring (Opisthopterus equatorialis)
- Bigeyed longfin herring (Opisthopterus macrops)
- American coastal pellona (Pellona harroweri)
- Raconda (Raconda russeliana)

==== Anchovies ====
- Regan's anchovy (Anchoa argentivittata)
- Key anchovy (Anchoa cayorum)
- Narrow-striped anchovy (Anchoa colonensis)
- Cuban anchovy (Anchoa cubana)
- Short anchovy (Anchoa curta)
- Slough anchovy (Anchoa delicatissima)
- Eigenmann's anchovy (Anchoa eigenmannia)
- Thin anchovy (Anchoa exigua)
- Longfinger anchovy (Anchoa filifera)
- Heller's anchovy (Anchoa helleri)
- Broad-striped anchovy (Anchoa hepsetus)
- Gulf of California slender anchovy (Anchoa ischana)
- Big-eye anchovy (Anchoa lamprotaenia)
- Bright anchovy (Anchoa lucida)
- Shortfinger anchovy (Anchoa lyolepis)
- Common anchovy (Anchoa mitchilli)
- False Panama anchovy (Anchoa mundeola)
- Northern gulf anchovy (Anchoa mundeoloides)
- Longnose anchovy (Anchoa nasus)
- Panama anchovy (Anchoa panamensis)
- Little anchovy (Anchoa parva)
- Scofield's anchovy (Anchoa scofieldi)
- Spicule anchovy (Anchoa spinifer)
- Starks's anchovy (Anchoa starksi)
- Walker's anchovy (Anchoa walkeri)
- Zabaleta anchovy (Anchovia clupeoides)
- Bigscale anchovy (Anchovia macrolepidota)
- Snubnose anchovy (Anchoviella brevirostris)
- Cayenne anchovy (Anchoviella cayennensis)
- Elongate anchovy (Anchoviella elongata)
- Broadband anchovy (Anchoviella lepidentostole)
- Flat anchovy (Anchoviella perfasciata)
- Atlantic anchoveta (Cetengraulis edentulus)
- Pacific anchoveta (Cetengraulis mysticetus)
- Grey's granadier anchovy (Coilia grayii)
- Lindman's grenadier anchovy (Coilia lindmani)
- Neglected grenadier anchovy (Coilia neglecta)
- European anchovy (Engraulis encrasicolus)
- Silver anchovy (Engraulis eurystole)
- Californian anchovy (Engraulis mordax)
- Peruvian anchoveta (Engraulis ringens)
- Atlantic sabertooth anchovy (Lycengraulis grossidens)
- Pacific sabretooth anchovy (Lycengraulis poeyi)
- Sabretoothed thryssa (Lycothrissa crocodilus)
- Setipinna phasa
- Moustached thryssa (Thryssa mystax)

==== Sundasalangids ====
- Mekong noodlefish (Sundasalanx mekongensis)
- Dwarf noodlefish (Sundasalanx praecox)

=== Scorpaeniformes ===
There are 175 species in the order Scorpaeniformes assessed as least concern.

==== Cottids ====
- Alcichthys elongatus
- Galathea sculpin (Antipodocottus galatheae)
- Blackfin hookear sculpin (Artediellichthys nigripinnis)
- Mosshead sculpin (Clinocottus globiceps)
- Coastrange sculpin (Cottus aleuticus)
- Prickly sculpin (Cottus asper)
- Cottus aturi
- Black sculpin (Cottus baileyi)
- Mottled sculpin (Cottus bairdii)
- Paiute sculpin (Cottus beldingii)
- Malheur sculpin (Cottus bendirei)
- Blue Ridge sculpin (Cottus caeruleomentum)
- Banded sculpin (Cottus carolinae)
- Chattahoochee sculpin (Cottus chattahoochee)
- Slimy sculpin (Cottus cognatus)
- Shorthead sculpin (Cottus confusus)
- Cottus duranii
- Potomac sculpin (Cottus girardi)
- European bullhead (Cottus gobio)
- Riffle sculpin (Cottus gulosus)
- Cottus hispaniolensis
- Columbia sculpin (Cottus hubbsi)
- Ozark sculpin (Cottus hypselurus)
- Knobfin sculpin (Cottus immaculatus)
- Kanawha sculpin (Cottus kanawhae)
- Marbled sculpin (Cottus klamathensis)
- Cottus koshewnikowi
- Cottus metae
- Baltic sculpin (Cottus microstomus)
- Cottus perifretum
- Reticulate sculpin (Cottus perplexus)
- Pit sculpin (Cottus pitensis)
- Alpine bullhead (Cottus poecilopus)
- Cottus rhenanus
- Torrent sculpin (Cottus rhotheus)
- Spoonhead sculpin (Cottus ricei)
- Tallapoosa sculpin (Cottus tallapoosae)
- Bull sculpin (Enophrys taurina)
- Threadfin sculpin (Icelinus filamentosus)
- Pacific staghorn sculpin (Leptocottus armatus)
- Butterfly sculpin (Melletes papilio)
- Norway bullhead (Micrenophrys lilljeborgii)
- Deepwater sculpin (Myoxocephalus thompsonii)
- Ricuzenius nudithorax
- Longspined bullhead (Taurulus bubalis)
- Scissortail sculpin (Triglops forficatus)
- Fourhorn sculpin (Triglopsis quadricornis)

==== Scorpaenids ====
- Sharpcheek scorpionfish (Idiastion kyphos)
- Spotwing scorpionfish (Neomerinthe beanorum)
- Spinycheek scorpionfish (Neomerinthe hemingwayi)
- Round scorpionfish (Neomerinthe rotunda)
- Ghanean scorpionfish (Pontinus accraensis)
- Longsnout scorpionfish (Pontinus castor)
- Mottled scorpionfish (Pontinus clemensi)
- Pontinus furcirhinus
- Speckled deepwater scorpionfish (Pontinus leda)
- Longspine scorpionfish (Pontinus longispinis)
- Large-headed scorpionfish (Pontinus macrocephalus)
- Spinythroat scorpionfish (Pontinus nematophthalmus)
- Deepwater jack (Pontinus nigropunctatus)
- Highfin scorpionfish (Pontinus rathbuni)
- Speckled scorpionfish (Pontinus sierra)
- Stalkeye scorpionfish (Pontinus strigatus)
- Spotback scorpionfish (Pontinus vaughani)
- Luna lion fish (Pterois lunulata)
- Peruvian scorpionfish (Scorpaena afuerae)
- Longfin scorpionfish (Scorpaena agassizii)
- Coral scorpionfish (Scorpaena albifimbria)
- Angola scorpionfish (Scorpaena angolensis)
- Goosehead scorpionfish (Scorpaena bergii)
- Shortfin scorpionfish (Scorpaena brachyptera)
- Barbfish (Scorpaena brasiliensis)
- Smooth-head scorpionfish (Scorpaena calcarata)
- Hunchback scorpionfish (Scorpaena dispar)
- Dwarf scorpionfish (Scorpaena elachys)
- Slender rockfish (Scorpaena elongata)
- Plumed scorpionfish (Scorpaena grandicornis)
- Scorpaena hatizyoensis
- Player scorpionfish (Scorpaena histrio)
- Mushroom scorpionfish (Scorpaena inermis)
- Smooth-cheek scorpionfish (Scorpaena isthmensis)
- Senegalese rockfish (Scorpaena laevis)
- Cadenat's rockfish (Scorpaena loppei)
- Madeira rockfish (Scorpaena maderensis)
- Pacific spotted scorpionfish (Scorpaena mystes)
- Norman's scorpionfish (Scorpaena normani)
- Small red scorpionfish (Scorpaena notata)
- Spotted scorpionfish (Scorpaena plumieri)
- Black scorpionfish (Scorpaena porcus)
- Reddish scorpionfish (Scorpaena russula)
- Large-scaled scorpion fish (Scorpaena scrofa)
- Sonora scorpionfish (Scorpaena sonorae)
- Spotted fin scorpionfish (Scorpaena stephanica)
- Reef scorpionfish (Scorpaenodes caribbaeus)
- Hairy scorpionfish (Scorpaenodes hirsutus)
- Insular scorpionfish (Scorpaenodes insularis)
- Scorpaenodes quadrispinosus
- Deepreef scorpionfish (Scorpaenodes tredecimspinosus)
- Rainbow scorpionfish (Scorpaenodes xyris)
- Scorpaenopsis altirostris
- Scorpaenopsis ramaraoi

==== Triglids ====
- Shortfin searobin (Bellator brachychir)
- Streamer searobin (Bellator egretta)
- Bellator farrago
- Nakedbelly searobin (Bellator gymnostethus)
- Chevron searobin (Bellator loxias)
- Horned searobin (Bellator militaris)
- Caribbean searobin (Bellator ribeiroi)
- Splitnose searobin (Bellator xenisma)
- Red gurnard (Chelidonichthys cuculus)
- Gabon gurnard (Chelidonichthys gabonensis)
- Bluefin gurnard (Chelidonichthys kumu)
- African gurnard (Chelidonichthys lastoviza)
- Tub gurnard (Chelidonichthys lucerna)
- Longfin gurnard (Chelidonichthys obscurus)
- Scalebreast gurnard (Lepidotrigla cadmani)
- Carol's gurnard (Lepidotrigla carolae)
- Spiny gurnard (Lepidotrigla dieuzeidei)
- Devil searobin (Lepidotrigla kishinouyi)
- Oman gurnard (Lepidotrigla omanensis)
- Spiny searobin (Prionotus alatus)
- Whitesnout searobin (Prionotus albirostris)
- Bean's searobin (Prionotus beanii)
- Twobeak searobin (Prionotus birostratus)
- Northern searobin (Prionotus carolinus)
- Striped searobin (Prionotus evolans)
- Bristly searobin (Prionotus horrens)
- Bigeye searobin (Prionotus longispinosus)
- Gulf of Mexico barred searobin (Prionotus martis)
- Bandtail searobin (Prionotus ophryas)
- Mexican searobin (Prionotus paralatus)
- Bluewing searobin (Prionotus punctatus)
- Bluespotted searobin (Prionotus roseus)
- Blackwing searobin (Prionotus rubio)
- Common searobin (Prionotus ruscarius)
- Leopard searobin (Prionotus scitulus)
- Shortwing searobin (Prionotus stearnsi)
- Lumptail searobin (Prionotus stephanophrys)
- Bighead searobin (Prionotus tribulus)
- Blackspotted gurnard (Pterygotrigla hemisticta)
- Piper gurnard (Trigla lyra)
- Streaked gurnard (Trigloporus lastoviza)

==== Other Scorpaeniformes species ====
- Hooknose (Agonus cataphractus)
- Careproctus albescens
- Spotted flathead (Cociella punctata)
- Velvetfish (Cocotropus roseus)
- Smooth horsefish (Congiopodus torvus)
- Pallid sculpin (Cottunculus thomsonii)
- Flathead helmet gurnard (Dactyloptena gilberti)
- Flying gurnard (Dactylopterus volitans)
- Ebinania costaecanariae
- Midwater scorpionfish (Ectreposebastes imus)
- Spotted velvetfish (Erisphex pottii)
- Blackbelly rosefish (Helicolenus dactylopterus)
- Chinese ghoul (Inimicus caledonicus)
- Longhead flatfish (Leviprora inops)
- Common seasnail (Liparis liparis)
- Montagu's seasnail (Liparis montagui)
- Obliquebanded stingfish (Minous dempsterae)
- Whitetail goblinfish (Minous quincarinatus)
- Ocosia possi
- Paracentropogon vespa
- Percis matsuii
- African armoured searobin (Peristedion cataphractum)
- Slender searobin (Peristedion gracile)
- Armored searobin (Peristedion miniatum)
- Dwarf thornyhead (Plectrogenium nanum)
- Psychrolutes inermis
- Cortez rockfish (Sebastes cortezi)
- Deepwater redfish (Sebastes mentella)
- Deepwater scorpionfish (Setarches guentheri)
- Guinea flathead (Solitas gruveli)
- Bearded roguefish (Tetraroge barbata)
- Tetraroge niger
- Atlantic thornyhead (Trachyscorpia cristulata)
- Spiny horsefish (Zanclorhynchus spinifer)

=== Esociformes ===
- Alaska blackfish (Dallia pectoralis)
- American pickerel (Esox americanus)
- Northern pike (Esox lucius)
- Muskellunge (Esox masquinongy)
- Chain pickerel (Esox niger)
- Olympic mudminnow (Novumbra hubbsi)
- Central mudminnow (Umbra limi)
- Eastern mudminnow (Umbra pygmaea)

=== Ophidiiformes ===
There are 123 species in the order Ophidiiformes assessed as least concern.

==== Brotulas ====
- Shore brotula (Alionematichthys minyomma)
- Longarm brotula (Calamopteryx goslinei)
- Calamopteryx jeb
- Teacher brotula (Calamopteryx robinsorum)
- Cataetyx alleni
- Cataetyx bruuni
- Cataetyx laticeps
- Lesser orange brotula (Dermatopsoides talboti)
- Diancistrus novaeguineae
- Grammonus ater
- Dusky brotula (Grammonus claudei)
- Purple brotula (Grammonus diagrammus)
- Grammonus longhursti
- Humpback brotula (Grammonus robustus)
- Gold brotula (Gunterichthys longipenis)
- Boehlke's coralbrotula (Ogilbia boehlkei)
- Walker's brotula (Ogilbia boydwalkeri)
- Key brotula (Ogilbia cayorum)
- Large-pored brotula (Ogilbia davidsmithi)
- Deroy's cuskeel (Ogilbia deroyi)
- Ghost brotula (Ogilbia jeffwilliamsi)
- Jewett's brotula (Ogilbia jewettae)
- Black-edged brotula (Ogilbia nigromarginata)
- Naked brotula (Ogilbia nudiceps)
- Brown brotula (Ogilbia robertsoni)
- Sabaj's coralbrotula (Ogilbia sabaji)
- Sedora's brotula (Ogilbia sedorae)
- Shy brotula (Ogilbia suarezae)
- Tyler's coralbrotula (Ogilbia tyleri)
- Gulf cuskeel (Ogilbia ventralis)
- Kakuk's coralbrotula (Ogilbichthys kakuki)
- Longfinned coralbrotula (Ogilbichthys longimanus)
- Small-eyed coralbrotula (Ogilbichthys microphthalmus)
- Shaggy cusk (Porocephalichthys dasyrhynchus)
- Black brotula (Stygnobrotula latebricola)

==== Ophidiidae ====
- Abyssobrotula galatheae
- Bony-eared assfish (Acanthonus armatus)
- Apagesoma delosommatus
- Barathrites iris
- Abyssal assfish (Bassozetus compressus)
- Bassozetus levistomatus
- Bassozetus normalis
- Bassozetus robustus
- Bassozetus taenia
- Benthocometes robustus
- Bearded brotula (Brotula barbata)
- Fore-spotted brotula (Brotula ordwayi)
- Spotted cusk-eel (Chilara taylori)
- Dicrolene hubrechti
- Dicrolene introniger
- Slender brotula (Dicrolene multifilis)
- Dicrolene nigra
- Holcomycteronus profundissimus
- Holcomycteronus squamosus
- Lamprogrammus brunswigi
- Lamprogrammus exutus
- Lamprogrammus niger
- Lepophidium aporrhox
- Shortbeard cusk-eel (Lepophidium brevibarbe)
- Brazilian cusk-eel (Lepophidium collettei)
- Whitespot cusk-eel (Lepophidium crossotum)
- Blackear cusk-eel (Lepophidium cultratum)
- Blackthroat cusk-eel (Lepophidium entomelan)
- Pepperfin cusk-eel (Lepophidium gilmorei)
- Mottled cusk-eel (Lepophidium jeannae)
- Marbled cusk-eel (Lepophidium marmoratum)
- Finescale cusk-eel (Lepophidium microlepis)
- Specklefin cusk eel (Lepophidium negropinna)
- Leopard cusk eel (Lepophidium pardale)
- Upsilon cusk-eel (Lepophidium pheromystax)
- Fawn cusk-eel (Lepophidium profundorum)
- Prowspine cusk eel (Lepophidium prorates)
- Lepophidium robustum
- Barred cusk-eel (Lepophidium staurophor)
- Blotchfin cusk eel (Lepophidium stigmatistium)
- Fringed cusk-eel (Lepophidium wileyi)
- Sooty cusk-eel (Lepophidium zophochir)
- Luciobrotula corethromycter
- Luciobrotula nolfi
- Monomitopus agassizii
- Monomitopus metriostoma
- Neobythites bimaculatus
- Twospot brotula (Neobythites gilli)
- Stripefin brotula (Neobythites marginatus)
- Neobythites monocellatus
- Ocellated brotula (Neobythites multiocellatus)
- Thread brotula (Neobythites stelliferoides)
- Ophidion antipholus
- Shorthead cusk-eel (Ophidion dromio)
- Spotfin cusk-eel (Ophidion galeoides)
- Blotched cusk-eel (Ophidion grayi)
- Guianan cusk-eel (Ophidion guianense)
- Band cusk-eel (Ophidion holbrookii)
- Mimic cusk-eel (Ophidion imitator)
- Rainbow cusk eel (Ophidion iris)
- Crested cusk-eel (Ophidion josephi)
- Harelip cusk-eel (Ophidion lagochila)
- Striped cusk-eel (Ophidion marginatum)
- Letter opener (Ophidion nocomis)
- Basketweave cusk-eel (Ophidion scrippsae)
- Mooneye cusk-eel (Ophidion selenops)
- Ghost cusk-eel (Otophidium chickcharney)
- Sleeper cusk-eel (Otophidium dormitator)
- Bighead cusk eel (Otophidium indefatigabile)
- Polka-dot cusk-eel (Otophidium omostigma)
- Dusky cusk (Parophidion schmidti)
- Penopus microphthalmus
- Velvetnose brotula (Petrotyx hopkinsi)
- Redfin brotula (Petrotyx sanguineus)
- Slender cuskeel (Porogadus miles)
- Pycnocraspedum squamipinne
- Selachophidium guentheri
- Pudgy cuskeel (Spectrunculus grandis)
- Thalassobathia pelagica

==== Aphyonids ====
- Gelatinous blindfish (Aphyonus gelatinosus)

==== Pearlfishes ====
- Carapus acus
- Carapus bermudensis
- Echiodon dawsoni
- Echiodon dentatus
- Nocturnal pearlfish (Echiodon exsilium)
- Pyramodon lindas
- Snyderidia canina

==== Parabrotulids ====
- Parabrotula plagiophthalma

=== Tetraodontiformes ===
There are 208 species and two subspecies in the order Tetraodontiformes assessed as least concern.

==== Molids ====
- Sharptail mola (Masturus lanceolatus)
- Slender sunfish (Ranzania laevis)

==== Triggerfishes ====
- Finescale triggerfish (Balistes polylepis)
- Balistes rotundatus
- Rough triggerfish (Canthidermis maculata)
- Ocean tally (Canthidermis sufflamen)
- Black triggerfish (Melichthys niger)
- Stone triggerfish (Pseudobalistes naufragium)
- Lagoon triggerfish (Rhinecanthus aculeatus)
- Assasi triggerfish (Rhinecanthus assasi)
- Halfmoon picassofish (Rhinecanthus lunula)
- Reef triggerfish (Rhinecanthus rectangulus)
- Blackbelly triggerfish (Rhinecanthus verrucosus)
- Masked triggerfish (Sufflamen fraenatum)
- Orangeside triggerfish (Sufflamen verres)
- Redtail triggerfish (Xanthichthys mento)
- Sargassum triggerfish (Xanthichthys ringens)

==== Tetraodontids ====
- Evileye blaasop (Amblyrhynchotes honckenii)
- Blue-spotted puffer (Arothron caeruleopunctatus)
- Masked puffer (Arothron diadematus)
- Starry toado (Arothron firmamentum)
- White-spotted puffer (Arothron hispidus)
- Immaculate puffer (Arothron immaculatus)
- Narrow-lined puffer (Arothron manilensis)
- Map puffer (Arothron mappa)
- Guineafowl puffer (Arothron meleagris)
- Blackspotted puffer (Arothron nigropunctatus)
- Reticulated pufferfish (Arothron reticularis)
- Stellate puffer (Arothron stellatus)
- Bronze puffer (Auriglobus modestus)
- Greenbottle pufferfish (Auriglobus nefastus)
- Spider-eye puffer (Canthigaster amboinensis)
- Canthigaster axiologus
- Bennett's sharpnose puffer (Canthigaster bennetti)
- Clown toado (Canthigaster callisterna)
- Macaronesian sharpnose-puffer (Canthigaster capistrata)
- Compressed toby (Canthigaster compressa)
- Crowned puffer (Canthigaster coronata)
- Canthigaster cyanospilota
- Lantern toby (Canthigaster epilampra)
- Southern Atlantic sharpnose-puffer (Canthigaster figueiredoi)
- Canthigaster inframacula
- Hawaiian whitespotted toby (Canthigaster jactator)
- Goldface toby (Canthigaster jamestyleri)
- Honeycomb toby (Canthigaster janthinoptera)
- Leopard sharpnose puffer (Canthigaster leoparda)
- Canthigaster margaritata
- Natal toby (Canthigaster natalensis)
- Shy toby (Canthigaster ocellicincta)
- Papuan toby (Canthigaster papua)
- Canthigaster petersii
- Spotted sharpnosed puffer (Canthigaster punctatissima)
- Pygmy toby (Canthigaster pygmaea)
- Brown-lined puffer (Canthigaster rivulata)
- Caribbean sharpnose-puffer (Canthigaster rostrata)
- Bicolored toby (Canthigaster smithae)
- Spotted sharpnose (Canthigaster solandri)
- West African sharpnose-puffer (Canthigaster supramacula)
- Tyler's toby (Canthigaster tyleri)
- Valentinni's sharpnose puffer (Canthigaster valentini)
- Carinotetraodon lorteti
- Bluespotted blaasop (Chelonodon laticeps)
- Milkspotted puffer (Chelonodon patoca)
- Banded puffer (Colomesus psittacus)
- Contusus brevicaudus
- Prickly toadfish (Contusus richei)
- Prickly puffer (Ephippion guttifer)
- Manystriped blowfish (Feroxodon multistriatus)
- Guentheridia formosa
- Javichthys kailolae
- Diamondback puffer (Lagocephalus guentheri)
- Smooth blaasop (Lagocephalus inermis)
- Smooth puffer (Lagocephalus laevigatus)
- Oceanic puffer (Lagocephalus lagocephalus)
- Lunartail puffer (Lagocephalus lunaris)
- Silver-cheeked toadfish (Lagocephalus sceleratus)
- Half-smooth golden pufferfish (Lagocephalus spadiceus)
- Lagocephalus suezensis
- Marilyna darwinii
- Marilyna pleurosticta
- Hairy puffer (Monotrete baileyi)
- Monotrete brevirostris
- Cambodian puffer (Monotrete cambodgiensis)
- Monotrete cochinchinensis
- Monotrete leiurus
- Monotrete ocellaris
- Monotrete suvattii
- Chameleon puffer (Monotrete turgidus)
- Ringed toadfish (Omegophora armilla)
- Bluespotted toadfish (Omegophora cyanopunctata)
- Rippled blaasop (Pelagocephalus marki)
- Orange-barred pufferfish (Polyspina piosae)
- Halstead's toadfish (Reicheltia halsteadi)
- Narrow-headed puffer (Sphoeroides angusticeps)
- Bullseye puffer (Sphoeroides annulatus)
- Marbled puffer (Sphoeroides dorsalis)
- Green puffer (Sphoeroides greeleyi)
- Slick puffer (Sphoeroides kendalli)
- Naked puffer (Sphoeroides lispus)
- Longnose puffer (Sphoeroides lobatus)
- Northern puffer (Sphoeroides maculatus)
- Guinean puffer (Sphoeroides marmoratus)
- Southern puffer (Sphoeroides nephelus)
- Blunthead puffer (Sphoeroides pachygaster)
- Least puffer (Sphoeroides parvus)
- Sphoeroides rosenblatti
- Peruvian puffer (Sphoeroides sechurae)
- Bandtail puffer (Sphoeroides spengleri)
- Checkered puffer (Sphoeroides testudineus)
- Pygmy puffer (Sphoeroides trichocephalus)
- Bearded puffer (Sphoeroides tyleri)
- Speckled puffer (Sphoeroides yergeri)
- Takifugu alboplumbeus
- Takifugu bimaculatus
- Takifugu chrysops
- Takifugu coronoidus
- Brown puffer (Takifugu exascurus)
- Grass puffer (Takifugu niphobles)
- Lattice blaasop (Takifugu oblongus)
- Takifugu obscurus
- Takifugu orbimaculatus
- Panther puffer (Takifugu pardalis)
- Finepatterned puffer (Takifugu poecilonotus)
- Takifugu porphyreus
- Takifugu reticularis
- Takifugu snyderi
- Takifugu stictonotus
- Yellowfin puffer (Takifugu xanthopterus)
- Smooth toadfish (Tetractenos glaber)
- Common toadfish (Tetractenos hamiltoni)
- Tetraodon abei
- Tetraodon biocellatus
- Tetraodon cutcutia
- Green pufferfish (Tetraodon fluviatilis)
- Fahaka pufferfish (Tetraodon lineatus)
- Mbu pufferfish (Tetraodon mbu)
- Congo pufferfish (Tetraodon miurus)
- Torquigener altipinnis
- Anderson's toadfish (Torquigener andersonae)
- Yellow-stripe toadfish (Torquigener brevipinnis)
- Yellowspotted puffer (Torquigener flavimaculosus)
- Floral puffer (Torquigener florealis)
- Torquigener gloerfelti
- Dwarf blowfish (Torquigener hypselogeneion)
- Multi-spotted toadfish (Torquigener pallimaculatus)
- Yellow-eyed toadfish (Torquigener parcuspinus)
- Torquigener paxtoni
- Spineless toadfish (Torquigener perlevis)
- Weeping toado (Torquigener pleurogramma)
- Brush-tail toadfish (Torquigener squamicauda)
- Torquigener tuberculiferus
- Torquigener vicinus
- Whitley's toadfish (Torquigener whitleyi)
- Spiny blaasop (Tylerius spinosissimus)

==== Filefish species ====
- Radial leatherjacket (Acreichthys radiatus)
- Bristletail filefish (Acreichthys tomentosus)
- Dotterel filefish (Aluterus heudelotii)
- Unicorn leatherjacket (Aluterus monoceros)
- Orange filefish (Aluterus schoepfii)
- Scribbled leatherjacket filefish (Aluterus scriptus)
- Broom filefish (Amanses scopas)
- Bearded leatherjacket (Anacanthus barbatus)
- Arotrolepis filicauda
- Southern pygmy leatherjacket (Brachaluteres jacksonianus)
- Taylor's inflator filefish (Brachaluteres taylori)
- Yelloweye leatherjacket (Cantherhines dumerilii)
- Spectacled filefish (Cantherhines fronticinctus)
- Cantherhines macrocerus
- Honeycomb filefish (Cantherhines pardalis)
- Cantherhines pullus
- Sandwich Isle file (Cantherhines sandwichiensis)
- Shy filefish (Cantherhines verecundus)
- Cantheschenia longipinnis
- Horse-shoe leatherjacket (Meuschenia hippocrepis)
- Fan-bellied leatherjacket (Monacanthus chinensis)
- Fringed filefish (Monacanthus ciliatus)
- Slender filefish (Monacanthus tuckeri)
- Blacksaddle filefish (Paraluteres prionurus)
- Gulf filefish (Paramonacanthus arabicus)
- White-blotched filefish (Paramonacanthus choirocephalus)
- Hairfinned leatherjacket (Paramonacanthus japonicus)
- Paramonacanthus lowei
- Yelloweye filefish (Pervagor alternans)
- Orangetail filefish (Pervagor aspricaudus)
- Blackbar filefish (Pervagor janthinosoma)
- Redtail filefish (Pervagor melanocephalus)
- Blacklined filefish (Pervagor nigrolineatus)
- Fantail filefish (Pervagor spilosoma)
- Rhinoceros leatherjacket (Pseudalutarius nasicornis)
- Minute leatherjacket (Rudarius minutus)
- Planehead filefish (Stephanolepis hispidus)
- Pygmy filefish (Stephanolepis setifer)
- Modest filefish (Thamnaconus modestoides)
- Tessellated leatherjacket (Thamnaconus tessellatus)

==== Ostraciids ====
- Acanthostracion guineensis
- Honeycomb cowfish (Acanthostracion polygonius)
- Scrawled cowfish (Acanthostracion quadricornis)
- Spotted trunkfish (Lactophrys bicaudalis)
- Buffalo trunkfish (Lactophrys trigonus)
- Smooth trunkfish (Lactophrys triqueter)
- Humpback turretfish (Tetrosomus gibbosus)

==== Porcupinefish ====
Species

- Bridled burrfish (Chilomycterus antennatus)
- Web burrfish (Chilomycterus antillarum)
- Spotfin burrfish (Chilomycterus reticulatus)
- Striped burrfish (Chilomycterus schoepfii)
- Chilomycterus spinosus
- Pelagic porcupinefish (Diodon eydouxii)
- Long-spine porcupinefish (Diodon holocanthus)
- Spot-fin porcupinefish (Diodon hystrix)

Subspecies

- Guinean burrfish (Chilomycterus spinosus mauretanicus)
- Brown burrfish (Chilomycterus spinosus spinosus)

==== Aracanids ====
- Chubby basketfish (Anoplocapros inermis)

==== Spikefishes ====
- Johnsonina eriomma
- Jambeau spikefish (Parahollardia lineata)
- Banded spikefish (Paratriacanthodes herrei)

=== Gadiformes ===
There are 91 species in the order Gadiformes assessed as least concern.

==== Gadids ====
- Golden cutlet (Merlangius merlangus)
- Atlantic tomcod (Microgadus tomcod)
- Pollack (Pollachius pollachius)
- Tadpole fish (Raniceps raninus)
- Capelin (Trisopterus capelanus)
- Norway pout (Trisopterus esmarkii)

==== Merlucciids ====
- Offshore hake (Merluccius albidus)
- Panama hake (Merluccius angustimanus)
- Shallow-water cape hake (Merluccius capensis)
- European hake (Merluccius merluccius)
- Merluccius polli
- North Pacific hake (Merluccius productus)

==== Grenadiers species ====
- Bathygadus favosus
- Bathygadus macrops
- Vaillant grenedier (Bathygadus melanobranchus)
- Cetonurus globiceps
- Hollowsnout grenadier (Coelorinchus caelorhincus)
- Coelorinchus geronimo
- Coelorinchus labiatus
- Coelorinchus mediterraneus
- Upturned snout rattail (Coelorinchus mycterismus)
- Swordsnout grenadier (Coelorinchus occa)
- Coelorinchus polli
- Coelorinchus quincunciatus
- Coelorinchus thompsoni
- Humboldt grenadier (Coryphaenoides ariommus)
- Abyssal grenadier (Coryphaenoides armatus)
- Günther's grenadier (Coryphaenoides guentheri)
- Ghostly grenadier (Coryphaenoides leptolepis)
- Coryphaenoides marshalli
- Mediterranean grenadier (Coryphaenoides mediterraneus)
- Largenose grenadier (Coryphaenoides nasutus)
- Coryphaenoides paramarshalli
- Deepwater grenadier (Coryphaenoides profundicolus)
- Rudis rattail (Coryphaenoides rudis)
- Longrayed whiptail (Coryphaenoides subserrulatus)
- Thickbeard grenadier (Coryphaenoides zaniophorus)
- Doublethread grenadier (Gadomus arcuatus)
- Threadfin grenadier (Gadomus longifilis)
- Glasshead grenadier (Hymenocephalus italicus)
- Bulbous rattail (Kuronezumia bubonis)
- Macrouroides inflaticeps
- Softhead grenadier (Malacocephalus laevis)
- American straptail grenadier (Malacocephalus occidentalis)
- Slendertail grenadier (Mataeocephalus tenuicauda)
- Mesobius berryi
- Common Atlantic grenadier (Nezumia aequalis)
- Nezumia africana
- Nezumia duodecim
- Nezumia micronychodon
- Nezumia milleri
- Roughtip grenadier (Nezumia sclerorhynchus)
- Roundhead grenadier (Odontomacrurus murrayi)
- Sphagemacrurus hirundo
- Tadpole whiptail (Squalogadus modificatus)
- Trachonurus robinsi
- Roughsnout grenadier (Trachyrincus scabrus)

==== Morids ====
- Blue antimora (Antimora rostrata)
- Eretmophorus kleinenbergi
- Beardless codling (Gadella imberbis)
- Gadella (Gadella maraldi)
- Laemonema laureysi
- Laemonema rhodochir
- Laemonema yarrellii
- Guenther's codling (Lepidion guentheri)
- Mediterranean codling (Lepidion lepidion)
- Common mora (Mora moro)
- Physiculus cyanostrophus
- Black codling (Physiculus dalwigki)
- Metallic codling (Physiculus fulvus)
- Physiculus karrerae
- Physiculus huloti
- Charcoal mora (Physiculus nematopus)
- Physiculus roseus
- Peruvian mora (Physiculus talarae)

==== Codlets ====
- Antenna codlet (Bregmaceros atlanticus)
- Codlet (Bregmaceros bathymaster)
- Striped codlet (Bregmaceros cantori)
- Stellate codlet (Bregmaceros houdei)
- Bregmaceros nectabanus

==== Lotids ====
- Fivebeard rockling (Ciliata mustela)
- Northern rockling (Ciliata septentrionalis)
- Fourbeard rockling (Enchelyopus cimbrius)
- Bigeye rockling (Gaidropsarus macrophthalmus)
- Three-bearded rockling (Gaidropsarus vulgaris)
- Burbot (Lota lota)
- Spanish ling (Molva macrophthalma)

==== Melanonids ====
- Arrowtail (Melanonus zugmayeri)

==== Phycids ====
- Forkbeard (Phycis phycis)
- Carolina hake (Urophycis earllii)
- Southern codling (Urophycis floridana)
- Spotted codling (Urophycis regia)

=== Mullets ===
- Mountain mullet (Agonostomus monticola)
- Fairy mullet (Agonostomus telfairii)
- Yellow-eye mullet (Aldrichetta forsteri)
- Snouted mullet (Chaenomugil proboscideus)
- Cape Verde mullet (Chelon bispinosus)
- Thicklip grey mullet (Chelon labrosus)
- Largescale mullet (Chelon macrolepis)
- Otomebora mullet (Chelon melinopterus)
- Fringelip mullet (Crenimugil crenilabis)
- Half fringelip mullet (Crenimugil heterocheilos)
- Squaretail mullet (Ellochelon vaigiensis)
- Abu mullet (Liza abu)
- Golden grey mullet (Liza aurata)
- Thinlip mullet (Liza ramada)
- Leaping mullet (Liza saliens)
- Banana mullet (Mugil bananensis)
- Leaping African mullet (Mugil capurrii)
- Flathead grey mullet (Mugil cephalus)
- White mullet (Mugil curema)
- Hospe mullet (Mugil hospes)
- Parassi mullet (Mugil incilis)
- Mugil rubrioculus
- Liseta mullet (Mugil setosus)
- Mugil trichodon
- Freshwater mullet (Myxus capensis)
- Corsula (Rhinomugil corsula)
- Yellowtail mullet (Sicamugil cascasia)
- Orange-eye mullet (Xenomugil thoburni)

=== Bichirs ===
- Guinean bichir (Polypterus ansorgii)
- Nile bichir (Polypterus bichir)
- Congo bichir (Polypterus congicus)
- Barred bichir (Polypterus delhezi)
- Saddled bichir (Polypterus endlicherii)
- Polypterus mokelembembe
- Ornate bichir (Polypterus ornatipinnis)
- Short-finned bichir (Polypterus palmas)
- Poll's bichir (Polypterus polli)
- West African birchir (Polypterus retropinnis)
- Senegal bichir (Polypterus senegalus)
- Mottled bichir (Polypterus weeksii)

=== Eels ===
There are 229 eel species assessed as least concern.

==== Chlopsids ====
- Seagrass eel (Chilorhinus suensonii)
- Stripesnout false moray (Chlopsis apterus)
- Bicolored false moray (Chlopsis bicolor)
- Chlopsis olokun
- Shortfin false moray (Kaupichthys brachychirus)
- Plain false moray (Kaupichthys hyoproroides)
- Collared eel (Kaupichthys nuchalis)
- Catherine's false moray (Robinsia catherinae)

==== Ophichthids ====
- Key worm eel (Ahlia egmontis)
- Fangtooth snake-eel (Aplatophis chauliodus)
- Stripe eel (Aprognathodon platyventris)
- Slender finless eel (Apterichtus anguiformis)
- Academy eel (Apterichtus ansp)
- European finless eel (Apterichtus caecus)
- Finless eel (Apterichtus equatorialis)
- Western Atlantic finless eel (Apterichtus kendalli)
- Apterichtus monodi
- Sooty eel (Bascanichthys bascanium)
- Sooty sand-eel (Bascanichthys bascanoides)
- Bascanichthys ceciliae
- Round sand-eel (Bascanichthys cylindricus)
- Panama sand-eel (Bascanichthys panamensis)
- Bascanichthys paulensis
- Whip eel (Bascanichthys scuticaris)
- Brachysomophis atlanticus
- Twostripe snake eel (Callechelys bilinearis)
- Callechelys bitaeniata
- Spotted ridgefin eel (Callechelys eristigma)
- Shorttail snake eel (Callechelys guineensis)
- Callechelys leucoptera
- Blotched snake eel (Callechelys muraena)
- Slantlip eel (Caralophia loxochila)
- Dalophis boulengeri
- Dalophis cephalopeltis
- Painted eel (Echelus myrus)
- Echelus pachyrhynchus
- Pacific spoon-nose eel (Echiophis brunneus)
- Spotted spoon-nose eel (Echiophis intertinctus)
- Stippled spoon-nose eel (Echiophis punctifer)
- Indifferent eel (Ethadophis akkistikos)
- Horsehair eel (Gordiichthys irretitus)
- String eel (Gordiichthys leibyi)
- Rope eel (Gordiichthys randalli)
- Mustachioed snake eel (Herpetoichthys fossatus)
- Surf eel (Ichthyapus ophioneus)
- Smiling snake-eel (Ichthyapus selachops)
- Oriental worm-eel (Lamnostoma orientalis)
- Ocellated sand-eel (Lamnostoma polyophthalma)
- Sailfin snake-eel (Letharchus rosenblatti)
- American sailfin eel (Letharchus velifer)
- Longfin spotted snake-eel (Myrichthys aspetocheiros)
- Sharptail eel (Myrichthys breviceps)
- Goldspotted eel (Myrichthys ocellatus)
- Clarion snake eel (Myrichthys pantostigmius)
- Leopard eel (Myrichthys pardalis)
- Spotted snake-eel (Myrichthys tigrinus)
- Longfin worm eel (Myrophis anterodorsalis)
- Broadnose worm eel (Myrophis platyrhynchus)
- Leaden worm eel (Myrophis plumbeus)
- Speckled worm eel (Myrophis punctatus)
- Pacific worm eel (Myrophis vafer)
- Mystriophis crosnieri
- African spoon-nose eel (Mystriophis rostellatus)
- Highfin snake eel (Ophichthus altipennis)
- Dusky snake eel (Ophichthus cylindroideus)
- Death-banded snake-eel (Ophichthus frontalis)
- Shrimp eel (Ophichthus gomesii)
- Faintsaddled snake eel (Ophichthus hyposagmatus)
- Slender snake eel (Ophichthus longipenis)
- Longarmed snake eel (Ophichthus mecopterus)
- Blackpored eel (Ophichthus melanoporus)
- Black-pored snake-eel (Ophichthus melope)
- Hollandse slangaal (Ophichthus ophis)
- Ophichthus pullus
- Palespotted eel (Ophichthus puncticeps)
- Punctuated snake-eel (Ophichthus remiger)
- King snake eel (Ophichthus rex)
- Rufus snake-eel (Ophichthus rufus)
- Wrinkled snake-eel (Ophichthus rugifer)
- Antillian snake eel (Ophichthus spinicauda)
- Pacific snake-eel (Ophichthus triserialis)
- Yellow snake-eel (Ophichthus zophochir)
- Serpent eel (Ophisurus serpens)
- Sailfin eel (Paraletharchus pacificus)
- Short-maned sand eel (Phaenomonas longissima)
- Elastic eel (Phaenomonas pinnata)
- Rice-paddy eel (Pisodonophis boro)
- Saddled snake eel (Pisodonophis semicinctus)
- Atlantic worm eel (Pseudomyrophis atlanticus)
- Pseudomyrophis frio
- Diminutive worm eel (Pseudomyrophis fugesae)
- Smallfin worm-eel (Pseudomyrophis micropinna)
- Pseudomyrophis nimius
- Blackspotted snake eel (Quassiremus ascensionis)
- Smallfish snake-eel (Quassiremus nothochir)
- Short-tailed viper-eel (Scytalichthys miurus)
- Angry worm eel (Skythrenchelys zabra)
- Xestochilus nebulosus

==== Congrids ====
- Acromycter perturbator
- Longtrunk conger (Ariosoma anale)
- Bandtooth conger (Ariosoma balearicum)
- Gilbert's garden eel (Ariosoma gilberti)
- Slope conger (Ariosoma prorigerum)
- Ariosoma selenops
- Bathycongrus bertini
- Neighbor conger (Bathycongrus vicinalis)
- Large-toothed conger (Bathyuroconger vicinus)
- Shortsnout conger (Chiloconger dentatus)
- European conger (Conger conger)
- Grey conger (Conger esculentus)
- American conger (Conger oceanicus)
- Manytooth conger (Conger triporiceps)
- Southern conger (Conger verreauxi)
- Longeye conger (Gnathophis bracheatopos)
- Hardtail conger (Gnathophis cinctus)
- Whitespotted garden eel (Gorgasia maculata)
- Dotted garden eel (Gorgasia punctata)
- Giraffe-spotted garden eel (Heteroconger camelopardalis)
- Pale green eel (Heteroconger digueti)
- Galapagos garden eel (Heteroconger klausewitzi)
- Brown garden eel (Heteroconger longissimus)
- Yellow garden eel (Heteroconger luteolus)
- Mimic garden eel (Heteroconger pellegrini)
- Japonoconger africanus
- Californian conger (Paraconger californiensis)
- Margintail conger (Paraconger caudilimbatus)
- Guinean conger (Paraconger notialis)
- Shorttail conger (Paraconger similis)
- Purplemouthed conger (Pseudophichthys splendens)
- Yellow conger (Rhynchoconger flavus)
- Whiptail conger (Rhynchoconger gracilior)
- Guppy's conger eel (Rhynchoconger guppyi)
- Bignose conger (Rhynchoconger nitens)
- Threadtail conger (Uroconger syringinus)
- Bristletooth conger (Xenomystax congroides)

==== Moray eels ====
- Hardtail moray (Anarchias galapagensis)
- Anarchias longicauda
- Pygmy moray (Anarchias similis)
- Broadbanded moray (Channomuraena vittata)
- Chain moray (Echidna catenata)
- Freckled moray (Echidna nocturna)
- Pebbletooth moray (Echidna peli)
- Fangtooth moray (Enchelycore anatina)
- Caribbean chestnut moray (Enchelycore carychroa)
- Mottled conger moray (Enchelycore nigricans)
- Slenderjaw moray (Enchelycore octaviana)
- White-margined moray (Enchelycore schismatorhynchus)
- Dark moray eel (Gymnothorax afer)
- Wrinkled moray (Gymnothorax angusticeps)
- Panamic green moray eel (Gymnothorax castaneus)
- Speckled moray eel (Gymnothorax dovii)
- Spotted-tail moray eel (Gymnothorax equatorialis)
- Green moray (Gymnothorax funebris)
- Lichen moray eel (Gymnothorax hubbsi)
- Blacktail moray eel (Gymnothorax kolpos)
- Sharktooth moray eel (Gymnothorax maderensis)
- Spotjaw moray eel (Gymnothorax mareei)
- Goldentail moray eel (Gymnothorax miliaris)
- Spotted moray (Gymnothorax moringa)
- Blackedge moray eel (Gymnothorax nigromarginatus)
- Caribbean ocellated moray eel (Gymnothorax ocellatus)
- Panamic moray eel (Gymnothorax panamensis)
- Small-spotted moray (Gymnothorax phalarus)
- Polygon moray (Gymnothorax polygonius)
- Freshwater moray (Gymnothorax polyuranodon)
- Low fin moray (Gymnothorax porphyreus)
- Ocellated moray (Gymnothorax saxicola)
- Brown moray eel (Gymnothorax unicolor)
- White-edged moray eel (Gymnothorax verrilli)
- Purplemouth moray eel (Gymnothorax vicinus)
- Redface eel (Monopenchelys acuta)
- Argus moray (Muraena argus)
- Muraena augusti
- Hourglass moray (Muraena clepsydra)
- Mediterranean moray (Muraena helena)
- Jewel moray (Muraena lentiginosa)
- Muraena melanotis
- Whitespot moray (Muraena pavonina)
- Reticulate moray (Muraena retifera)
- Muraena robusta
- Ribbon eel (Rhinomuraena quaesita)
- Brown snake moray eel (Uropterygius fuscoguttatus)
- Uropterygius macularius
- Crafty moray (Uropterygius versutus)
- Uropterygius wheeleri

==== Cutthroat eels ====
- Shortbelly eel (Dysomma anguillare)
- Pignosed arrowtooth eel (Dysomma brevirostre)
- Haptenchelys texis
- Muddy arrowtooth eel (Ilyophis brunneus)
- Snubnosed eel (Simenchelys parasitica)
- Grey cutthroat eel (Synaphobranchus affinis)
- Kaup's arrowtooth eel (Synaphobranchus kaupii)
- Synaphobranchus oregoni

==== Nettastomatids ====
- Facciolella karreri
- Blacktail pike-conger (Hoplunnis diomediana)
- Freckled pike-conger (Hoplunnis macrura)
- Slender duckbill eel (Hoplunnis punctata)
- Duckbill eel (Hoplunnis schmidti)
- Spotted pike-conger (Hoplunnis tenuis)
- Blackfin sorcerer (Nettastoma melanurum)
- Pygmy pikeconger (Nettenchelys pygmaea)
- Longface eel (Saurenchelys cognita)
- Blacktail buckbill eel (Saurenchelys fierasfer)
- Saurenchelys meteori
- Whipsnout sorcerer (Venefica proboscidea)
- Venefica tentaculata

==== Heterenchelyids ====
- Slender mud eel (Panturichthys isognathus)
- Slender shortfaced eel (Panturichthys longus)
- Mauritanian shortface eel (Panturichthys mauritanicus)
- Pacific mud eel (Pythonichthys asodes)
- Caribbean mud eel (Pythonichthys sanguineus)

==== Other eel species ====
- Giant mottled eel (Anguilla marmorata)
- African longfin eel (Anguilla mossambica)
- Avocet snipe eel (Avocettina infans)
- Coloconger cadenati
- Congriscus maldivensis
- Guinean pike conger (Cynoponticus ferox)
- Guayana pike-conger (Cynoponticus savanna)
- Bobtail eel (Cyema atrum)
- Narrownecked oceanic eel (Derichthys serpentinus)
- Pelican eel (Eurypharynx pelecanoides)
- Spaghetti eel (Moringua edwardsi)
- Orange eel (Myroconger nigrodentatus)
- Boxer snipe eel (Nemichthys curvirostris)
- Slender snipe eel (Nemichthys scolopaceus)
- Ridged eel (Neoconger mucronatus)
- Smalleye spaghetti-eel (Neoconger vermiformis)
- Dana duckbill eel (Nessorhamphus danae)
- Duckbill oceanic eel (Nessorhamphus ingolfianus)
- Taillight gulper (Saccopharynx ampullaceus)
- Saccopharynx lavenbergi
- Saccopharynx ramosus
- Saccopharynx thalassa
- Bean's sawtooth eel (Serrivomer beanii)
- Short-tooth sawpalate (Serrivomer lanceolatoides)
- Black serrivomerid eel (Stemonidium hypomelas)

=== Flatfishes ===
There are 167 flatfish species assessed as least concern.

==== Pleuronectids ====
- Petrale sole (Eopsetta jordani)
- Common dab (Limanda limanda)
- Arctic flounder (Liopsetta glacialis)
- Slender sole (Lyopsetta exilis)
- Peppered flounder (Paralichthodes algoensis)
- Southern lemon sole (Pelotretis flavilatus)
- European flounder (Platichthys flesus)
- Starry flounder (Platichthys stellatus)
- European plaice (Pleuronectes platessa)
- Diamond turbot (Pleuronichthys guttulatus)
- Ocellated turbot (Pleuronichthys ocellatus)
- Spotted turbot (Pleuronichthys ritteri)
- Hornyhead turbot (Pleuronichthys verticalis)
- New Zealand flounder (Rhombosolea plebeia)

==== Soleids ====
- Achiroides melanorhijnchus
- Bathysolea polli
- Deepwater sole (Bathysolea profundicola)
- Mekong blind sole (Brachirus elongatus)
- Harmand's sole (Brachirus harmandi)
- Pan sole (Brachirus pan)
- Brachirus panoides
- Brachirus siamensis
- Solenette (Buglossidium luteum)
- Dagetichthys lakdoensis
- Wedge sole (Dicologlossa cuneata)
- Dicologlossa hexophthalma
- Thickback sole (Microchirus variegatus)
- Banded sole (Microchirus wittei)
- Whiskered sole (Monochirus hispidus)
- Sand sole (Pegusa lascaris)
- Egyptian sole (Solea aegyptiaca)

==== Tonguefishes ====
- River tonguesole (Cynoglossus feldmanni)
- Smallscale tonguesole (Cynoglossus microlepis)
- Cynoglossus trigrammus
- Coral reef tonguefish (Symphurus arawak)
- Inkspot tonguefish (Symphurus atramentatus)
- California tonguefish (Symphurus atricaudus)
- Chocolate tonguefish (Symphurus callopterus)
- Caribbean tonguefish (Symphurus caribbeanus)
- Chabanaud's tonguefish (Symphurus chabanaudi)
- Offshore tonguefish (Symphurus civitatium)
- Spottedfin tonguefish (Symphurus diomedeanus)
- Elongate tonguefish (Symphurus elongatus)
- Banded tongue-fish (Symphurus fasciolaris)
- Dwarf tonguefish (Symphurus gorgonae)
- Symphurus insularis
- Lee's tonguefish (Symphurus leei)
- Elongate tonguesole (Symphurus ligulatus)
- Symphurus melanurus
- Blackstripe tonguefish (Symphurus melasmatotheca)
- Largescale tonguefish (Symphurus minor)
- Tonguesole (Symphurus nigrescens)
- Norman's tonguesole (Symphurus normani)
- Caribbean smalleyed tonguefish (Symphurus oculellus)
- Spotfin tonguefish (Symphurus oligomerus)
- Ocellated tonguefish (Symphurus ommaspilus)
- Pygmy tonguefish (Symphurus parvus)
- Longtail tonguefish (Symphurus pelicanus)
- Deepwater tonguefish (Symphurus piger)
- Blackcheek tonguefish (Symphurus plagiusa)
- Duskycheek tonguefish (Symphurus plagusia)
- Halfstriped tonguefish (Symphurus prolatinaris)
- Northern tonguefish (Symphurus pusillus)
- Patchtail tonguefish (Symphurus rhytisma)
- Tessellated tonguefish (Symphurus tessellatus)
- Dark cheek tongue (Symphurus undecimplerus)
- Spottail tonguefish (Symphurus urospilus)
- Vanmelle's tonguefish (Symphurus vanmelleae)
- Mottled tonguefish (Symphurus varius)
- William's tonguefish (Symphurus williamsi)

==== Paralichthyids ====
- Cyclope flounder (Ancylopsetta cycloidea)
- Three-spot flounder (Ancylopsetta dendritica)
- Three-eye flounder (Ancylopsetta dilecta)
- Ocellated flounder (Ancylopsetta ommata)
- Veracruz whiff (Citharichthys abbotti)
- Gulf stream flounder (Citharichthys arctifrons)
- Sand whiff (Citharichthys arenaceus)
- Horned whiff (Citharichthys cornutus)
- Doublespot whiff (Citharichthys dinoceros)
- Gulf sanddab (Citharichthys fragilis)
- Bigmouth sanddab (Citharichthys gilberti)
- Anglefin whiff (Citharichthys gymnorhinus)
- Spotted whiff (Citharichthys macrops)
- Five-rayed sanddab (Citharichthys mariajorisae)
- Citharichthys minutus
- Small sanddab (Citharichthys platophrys)
- Bay whiff (Citharichthys spilopterus)
- Smooth flounder (Citharichthys stampflii)
- Citharichthys valdezi
- Mexican flounder (Cyclopsetta chittendeni)
- Spotfin flounder (Cyclopsetta fimbriata)
- God's flounder (Cyclopsetta panamensis)
- Toothed flounder (Cyclopsetta querna)
- Cortez flounder (Etropus ciadi)
- Fringed flounder (Etropus crossotus)
- Shelf flounder (Etropus cyclosquamus)
- Sole flounder (Etropus ectenes)
- Peruvian flounder (Etropus peruvianus)
- Gray flounder (Etropus rimosus)
- Shrimp flounder (Gastropsetta frontalis)
- Hippoglossina bollmani
- Bigeye flounder (Hippoglossina macrops)
- Bigmouth sole (Hippoglossina stomata)
- Foureye flounder (Hippoglossina tetrophthalma)
- Fine flounder (Paralichthys adspersus)
- Gulf flounder (Paralichthys albigutta)
- California halibut (Paralichthys californicus)
- Summer flounder (Paralichthys dentatus)
- Paralichthys oblongus
- Broad flounder (Paralichthys squamilentus)
- Papillose flounder (Syacium guineensis)
- Shoal flounder (Syacium gunteri)
- Beach flounder (Syacium latifrons)
- Longfin flounder (Syacium longidorsale)
- Channel flounder (Syacium micrurum)
- Oval flounder (Syacium ovale)
- Dusky flounder (Syacium papillosum)
- Fantail flounder (Xystreurys liolepis)

==== American soles ====
- Drab sole (Achirus achirus)
- Plainfin sole (Achirus declivis)
- Brown sole (Achirus klunzingeri)
- Lined sole (Achirus lineatus)
- Mazatlan sole (Achirus mazatlanus)
- Network sole (Achirus scutum)
- Longtail sole (Apionichthys dumerili)
- Apionichthys nattereri
- North American naked sole (Gymnachirus melas)
- Naked sole (Gymnachirus nudus)
- Gulf of Mexico fringed sole (Gymnachirus texae)
- Fringed sole (Trinectes fimbriatus)
- Trinectes fluviatilis
- Spottedfin sole (Trinectes fonsecensis)
- Scrawled sole (Trinectes inscriptus)
- Hogchoker (Trinectes maculatus)
- Smalleye sole (Trinectes microphthalmus)
- Slipper sole (Trinectes paulistanus)
- Yellow-tail sole (Trinectes xanthurus)

==== Bothids ====
- Cape scaldfish (Arnoglossus capensis)
- Imperial scaldfish (Arnoglossus imperialis)
- Mediterranean scaldfish (Arnoglossus laterna)
- Rüppell's scaldback (Arnoglossus rueppelii)
- Pacific leopard flounder (Bothus leopardinus)
- Plate fish (Bothus lunatus)
- Bothus maculiferus
- Peacock flounder (Bothus mancus)
- Bothus mellissi
- Eyed flounder (Bothus ocellatus)
- Wide-eyed flounder (Bothus podas)
- Twospot flounder (Bothus robinsi)
- Pelican flounder (Chascanopsetta lugubris)
- Speckled-tail flounder (Engyophrys sanctilaurentii)
- American spiny flounder (Engyophrys senta)
- Günther's flounder (Laeops guentheri)
- Acapulco flounder (Monolene dubiosa)
- Pacific deepwater flounder (Monolene maculipinna)
- Slim flounder (Monolene megalepis)
- Martens' moonflounder (Monolene mertensi)
- Smallmouth moonflounder (Monolene microstoma)
- Deepwater flounder (Monolene sessilicauda)
- Striped-fin flounder (Perissias taeniopterus)
- Caribbean flounder (Trichopsetta caribbaea)
- Spot-fin sash flounder (Trichopsetta melasma)
- Furrowed sash flounder (Trichopsetta orbisulcus)
- Sash flounder (Trichopsetta ventralis)

==== Citharids ====
- Yellow-dappled flounder (Brachypleura novaezeelandiae)
- Atlantic spotted flounder (Citharus linguatula)

==== Scophthalmids ====
- Norwegian topknot (Phrynorhombus norvegicus)

=== Anglerfishes ===
There are 87 anglerfish species assessed as least concern.

==== Goosefish species ====
- Pacific goosefish (Lophiodes caulinaris)
- Reticulated goosefish (Lophiodes reticulatus)
- Threadfin angler (Lophiodes spilurus)
- Blackfin goosefish (Lophius gastrophysus)
- Angler (Lophius piscatorius)

==== Frogfishes ====
- Tail-jet frogfish (Antennarius analis)
- Longlure frogfish (Antennarius multiocellatus)
- Antennarius pardalis
- Antennarius pauciradiatus
- Striated frogfish (Antennarius striatus)
- Island frogfish (Antennatus bermudensis)
- Spotfin frogfish (Antennatus nummifer)
- Bloody frogfish (Antennatus sanguineus)
- Bandtail frogfish (Antennatus strigatus)
- Roughbar frogfish (Fowlerichthys avalonis)
- Ocellated frogfish (Fowlerichthys ocellatus)
- Singlespot frogfish (Fowlerichthys radiosus)
- Senegalese frogfish (Fowlerichthys senegalensis)
- Sargassum fish (Histrio histrio)

==== Oneirodids ====
- Chaenophryne draco
- Longhead dreamer (Chaenophryne longiceps)
- Chaenophryne ramifera
- Dolopichthys allector
- Dolopichthys danae
- Dolopichthys dinema
- Dolopichthys longicornis
- Whalehead dreamer (Lophodolos acanthognathus)
- Lophodolos indicus
- Microlophichthys microlophus
- Pacific dreamer (Oneirodes acanthias)
- Oneirodes carlsbergi
- Bulbous dreamer (Oneirodes eschrichtii)
- Oneirodes macrosteus
- Oneirodes schmidti
- Oneirodes theodoritissieri
- Pentherichthys atratus
- Phyllorhinichthys balushkini
- Phyllorhinichthys micractis
- Prickly dreamer (Spiniphryne gladisfenae)

==== Ogcocephalids ====
- Atlantic batfish (Dibranchus atlanticus)
- Dibranchus tremendus
- Pancake batfish (Halieutichthys aculeatus)
- Two-spine batfish (Halieutichthys bispinosus)
- Louisiana pancake batfish (Halieutichthys intermedius)
- Longnose batfish (Ogcocephalus corniger)
- Polka-dot batfish (Ogcocephalus cubifrons)
- Red-lipped batfish (Ogcocephalus darwini)
- Slantbrown batfish (Ogcocephalus declivirostris)
- Shortnose batfish (Ogcocephalus nasutus)
- Marked batfish (Ogcocephalus notatus)
- Ogcocephalus pantostictus
- Roughback batfish (Ogcocephalus parvus)
- Cocos batfish (Ogcocephalus porrectus)
- Dwarf batfish (Ogcocephalus pumilus)
- Palefin batfish (Ogcocephalus rostellum)
- Rounded batfish (Zalieutes elater)
- Tricorn batfish (Zalieutes mcgintyi)

==== Whipnose anglers ====
- Elsman's whipnose (Gigantactis elsmani)
- Gigantactis gibbsi
- Gigantactis golovani
- Gigantactis herwigi
- Gigantactis ios
- Gigantactis longicirra

==== Leftvents ====
- Haplophryne mollis
- Deepsea anglerfish (Linophryne arborifera)
- Linophryne lucifer
- Linophryne pennibarbata
- Photocorynus spiniceps

==== Other anglerfish species ====
- Bufoceratias wedli
- Fanfin angler (Caulophryne jordani)
- Caulophryne polynema
- Horned lantern fish (Centrophryne spinulosa)
- Krøyer's deep sea angler fish (Ceratias holboelli)
- Stargazing seadevil (Ceratias uranoscopus)
- Chaunax flammeus
- Pink frogmouth (Chaunax pictus)
- Chaunax suttkusi
- Triplewart seadevil (Cryptopsaras couesii)
- Diceratias pileatus
- Himantolophus cornifer
- Himantolophus crinitus
- Atlantic footballfish (Himantolophus groenlandicus)
- Himantolophus paucifilosus
- Lasiognathus saccostoma
- Humpback anglerfish (Melanocetus johnsonii)
- Melanocetus murrayi
- Toothed seadevil (Neoceratias spinifer)

=== Beryciformes ===
There are 71 species in the order Beryciformes assessed as least concern.

==== Holocentrids ====
- Spinycheek soldierfish (Corniger spinosus)
- Holocentrus adscensionis
- Longspine squirrelfish (Holocentrus rufus)
- Shadowfin soldierfish (Myripristis adusta)
- Brick soldierfish (Myripristis amaena)
- Blotcheye soldierfish (Myripristis berndti)
- Splendid soldierfish (Myripristis botche)
- Golden-finned squirrelfish (Myripristis chryseres)
- Earle's soldierfish (Myripristis earlei)
- Large-scale soldierfish (Myripristis hexagona)
- Blackbar soldierfish (Myripristis jacobus)
- Shoulderbar soldierfish (Myripristis kuntee)
- Panamic soldierfish (Myripristis leiognathus)
- Pinecone soldierfish (Myripristis murdjan)
- Scarlet soldier (Myripristis pralinia)
- Myripristis randalli
- Seychelles soldierfish (Myripristis seychellensis)
- Little soldierfish (Myripristis trachyacron)
- Lattice soldierfish (Myripristis violacea)
- Whitetip soldierfish (Myripristis vittata)
- Whitespot soldierfish (Myripristis woodsi)
- Smooth squirrelfish (Neoniphon argenteus)
- Gold-lined squirrelfish (Neoniphon aurolineatus)
- Neoniphon marianus
- Mouth-fin squirrelfish (Neoniphon opercularis)
- Sammara squirrelfish (Neoniphon sammara)
- Straighthead soldierfish (Ostichthys archiepiscopus)
- Japanese soldierfish (Ostichthys japonicus)
- Kai soldierfish (Ostichthys kaianus)
- Ostichthys sandix
- Bigeye soldierfish (Ostichthys trachypoma)
- Shy soldierfish (Plectrypops lima)
- Goggle-eyed squirrelfish (Plectrypops retrospinis)
- Spinyface soldierfish (Pristilepis oligolepis)
- Sargocentron bullisi
- Silverspot squirrelfish (Sargocentron caudimaculatum)
- Horned squirrelfish (Sargocentron cornutum)
- Reef squirrelfish (Sargocentron coruscum)
- Crown squirrelfish (Sargocentron diadema)
- Cryptic squirrelfish (Sargocentron dorsomaculatum)
- Sargocentron ensifer
- Sargocentron hastatum
- Sargocentron hormion
- Dwarf squirrelfish (Sargocentron iota)
- Samurai squirrelfish (Sargocentron ittodai)
- Sargocentron lepros
- Blackblotch squirrelfish (Sargocentron melanospilos)
- Smallmouth squirrelfish (Sargocentron microstoma)
- Saddle squirrelfish (Sargocentron poco)
- Dark-striped squirrelfish (Sargocentron praslin)
- Speckled squirrelfish (Sargocentron punctatissimum)
- Scarlet-tailed squirrel-fish (Sargocentron rubrum)
- Sabre squirrelfish (Sargocentron spiniferum)
- North Pacific squirrelfish (Sargocentron spinosissimum)
- Tinsel squirrelfish (Sargocentron suborbitalis)
- Blue lined squirrelfish (Sargocentron tiere)
- Pink squirrelfish (Sargocentron tiereoides)
- Blackbarred squirrelfish (Sargocentron vexillarium)
- Violet squirrelfish (Sargocentron violaceum)
- Hawaiian squirrelfish (Sargocentron xantherythrum)

==== Other Beryciformes species ====
- Common fangtooth (Anoplogaster cornuta)
- Alfonsino (Beryx decadactylus)
- Splendid alfonsino (Beryx splendens)
- Parin's spinyfin (Diretmichthys parini)
- Longwing spinyfin (Diretmoides pauciradiatus)
- Silver spinyfin (Diretmus argenteus)
- Big roughy (Gephyroberyx darwinii)
- Black roughy (Hoplostethus cadenati)
- Silver roughy (Hoplostethus mediterraneus)
- Atlantic flashlightfish (Kryptophanaron alfredi)
- Paratrachichthys fernandezianus

=== Stephanoberyciformes ===
- Pricklefish (Acanthochaenus luetkenii)
- Melamphaes eulepis
- Melamphaes leprus
- Melamphaes simus
- Melamphaes spinifer
- Crested bigscale (Poromitra crassiceps)
- Scopeloberyx opisthopterus
- Ragged bigscale (Scopelogadus mizolepis)

=== Aulopiformes ===
There are 81 species in the order Aulopiformes assessed as least concern.

==== Notosudids ====
- Ahliesaurus berryi
- Paperbones (Luciosudis normani)
- Scopelosaurus argenteus
- Scopelosaurus gibbsi
- Scopelosaurus herwigi
- Blackfin waryfish (Scopelosaurus lepidus)
- Scopelosaurus meadi
- Scopelosaurus smithii

==== Barracudinas ====
- Spotted barracudina (Arctozenus risso)
- Dolichosudis fuliginosa
- Lestidiops affinis
- Lestidiops cadenati
- Lestidiops distans
- Pacific barracudina (Lestidiops jayakari)
- Slender barracudina (Lestidiops ringens)
- Lestidiops similis
- Lestidiops sphyrenoides
- Atlantic barracudina (Lestidium atlanticum)
- Lestrolepis intermedia
- Macroparalepis affinis
- Macroparalepis brevis
- Duckbill barracudina (Magnisudis atlantica)
- Paralepis elongata
- Paralepis speciosa
- Stemonosudis gracilis
- Stemonosudis intermedia
- Stemonosudis siliquiventer
- Fierce pike smelt (Sudis atrox)
- Uncisudis quadrimaculata

==== Ipnopids ====
- Bathymicrops regis
- Attenuated spider fish (Bathypterois atricolor)
- Bathypterois dubius
- Tripodfish (Bathypterois grallator)
- Abyssal spiderfish (Bathypterois longipes)
- Bathypterois mediterraneus
- Blackfin spiderfish (Bathypterois phenax)
- Bathypterois quadrifilis
- Bathypterois viridensis
- Marion's spiderfish (Bathytyphlops marionae)
- Bathytyphlops sewelli
- Grideye fish (Ipnops agassizii)

==== Pearleyes ====
- Zugmayer's pearleye (Benthalbella infans)
- Hubb's pearleye (Rosenblattichthys hubbsi)
- Scopelarchoides danae
- Blackbelly pearleye (Scopelarchus analis)
- Staring pearleye (Scopelarchus guentheri)
- Bigfin pearleye (Scopelarchus michaelsarsi)

==== Synodontids ====
- Brazilian lizardfish (Saurida brasiliensis)
- Smallscale lizardfish (Saurida caribbaea)
- Shortjaw lizardfish (Saurida normani)
- Suspicious lizardfish (Saurida suspicio)
- Sharpnose lizardfish (Synodus bondi)
- Inotted lizardfish (Synodus evermanni)
- Inshore lizardfish (Synodus foetens)
- Sand diver (Synodus intermedius)
- Sauro lizardfish (Synodus lacertinus)
- California lizardfish (Synodus lucioceps)
- Largespot lizardfish (Synodus macrostigmus)
- Offshore lizardfish (Synodus poeyi)
- Atlantic lizardfish (Synodus saurus)
- Shorthead lizardfish (Synodus scituliceps)
- Sechura lizardfish (Synodus sechurae)
- Diamond lizardfish (Synodus synodus)
- Trachinocephalus myops

==== Other Aulopiformes species ====
- Alepisaurus brevirostris
- Long-snouted lancetfish (Alepisaurus ferox)
- Daggertooth (Anotopterus pharao)
- Guinean flagfin (Aulopus cadenati)
- Mediterranean flagfin (Aulopus filamentosus)
- Deepsea lizardfish (Bathysaurus ferox)
- Highfin lizardfish (Bathysaurus mollis)
- Agassiz's thread-sail fish (Chlorophthalmus agassizi)
- Coccorella atlantica
- Balbo sabretooth (Evermannella balbo)
- Indian sabertooth (Evermannella melanoderma)
- Gigantura chuni
- Indian telescopefish (Gigantura indica)
- Odontostomops normalops
- Hammerjaw (Omosudis lowii)
- Parasudis fraserbrunneri
- Longnose greeneye (Parasudis truculenta)

=== Notacanthiformes ===
- Allied halosaur (Aldrovandia affinis)
- Aldrovandia gracilis
- Aldrovandia oleosa
- Hawaiian halosaurid fish (Aldrovandia phalacra)
- Aldrovandia rostrata
- Abyssal halosaur (Halosauropsis macrochir)
- Halosaurus attenuatus
- Halosaurus guentheri
- Halosaurus johnsonianus
- Oven's halosaur (Halosaurus ovenii)
- Snub-nosed spiny eel (Notacanthus chemnitzii)
- Longnose tapirfish (Polyacanthonotus challengeri)
- Polyacanthonotus merretti

=== Zeiformes ===
- Allocyttus guineensis
- Warty oreo (Allocyttus verrucosus)
- Rosy dory (Cyttopsis rosea)
- New Zealand dory (Cyttus novaezealandiae)
- Thorny tinselfish (Grammicolepis brachiusculus)
- Spotted tinselfish (Xenolepidichthys dalgleishi)
- Zenion hololepis
- Silvery John dory (Zenopsis conchifer)
- Cape dory (Zeus capensis)

=== Stomiiformes ===
There are 141 species in the order Stomiiformes assessed as least concern.

==== Sternoptychids ====
- Argyripnus atlanticus
- Lovely hatchetfish (Argyropelecus aculeatus)
- Deepsea hatchetfish (Argyropelecus affinis)
- Giant hatchetfish (Argyropelecus gigas)
- Half-naked hatchetfish (Argyropelecus hemigymnus)
- Argyropelecus sladeni
- Maurolicus amethystinopunctatus
- Maurolicus breviculus
- Maurolicus walvisensis
- Atlantic pearlside (Maurolicus weitzmani)
- Slope hatchetfish (Polyipnus clarus)
- Polyipnus elongatus
- Polyipnus polli
- Diaphanous hatchet fish (Sternoptyx diaphana)
- Sternoptyx obscura
- Highlight hatchetfish (Sternoptyx pseudobscura)
- False oblique hatchetfish (Sternoptyx pseudodiaphana)
- Constellationfish (Valenciennellus tripunctulatus)

==== Stomiids ====
- Aristostomias lunifer
- Aristostomias polydactylus
- Aristostomias tittmanni
- Aristostomias xenostoma
- Astronesthes atlanticus
- Astronesthes caulophorus
- Astronesthes decoratus
- Astronesthes haplophos
- Astronesthes indicus
- Astronesthes indopacificus
- Astronesthes karsteni
- Astronesthes leucopogon
- Astronesthes macropogon
- Astronesthes micropogon
- Astronesthes niger
- Astronesthes nigroides
- Richardson's snaggletooth (Astronesthes richardsoni)
- Bathophilus brevis
- Bathophilus digitatus
- Bathophilus longipinnis
- Bathophilus metallicus
- Bathophilus nigerrimus
- Bathophilus pawneei
- Bathophilus schizochirus
- Bathophilus vaillanti
- Borostomias antarcticus
- Borostomias elucens
- Sickle snaggletooth (Borostomias mononema)
- Dana viperfish (Chauliodus danae)
- Chauliodus minimus
- Chauliodus schmidti
- Sloane's viperfish (Chauliodus sloani)
- Threadfin dragonfish (Echiostoma barbatum)
- Eustomias aequatorialis
- Eustomias albibulbus
- Eustomias arborifer
- Eustomias bibulbosus
- Eustomias bigelowi
- Eustomias enbarbatus
- Eustomias fissibarbis
- Eustomias furcifer
- Eustomias intermedius
- Eustomias kreffti
- Eustomias lanceolatus
- Eustomias longibarba
- Yellowstem dragonfish (Eustomias macrurus)
- Eustomias melanonema
- Eustomias melanostigma
- Eustomias monodactylus
- Eustomias obscurus
- Eustomias posti
- Eustomias satterleei
- Eustomias simplex
- Eustomias spherulifer
- Eustomias triramis
- Eustomias vulgaris
- Longbarb dragonfish (Flagellostomias boureei)
- Grammatostomias dentatus
- Grammatostomias flagellibarba
- Heterophotus ophistoma
- Idiacanthus atlanticus
- Ribbon sawtail fish (Idiacanthus fasciola)
- Leptostomias bermudensis
- Leptostomias gladiator
- Leptostomias gracilis
- Leptostomias longibarba
- Stoplight loosejaw (Malacosteus niger)
- Melanostomias bartonbeani
- Melanostomias biseriatus
- Melanostomias melanops
- Melanostomias paucilaternatus
- Melanostomias spilorhynchus
- Melanostomias tentaculatus
- Valdivia black dragon fish (Melanostomias valdiviae)
- Cape snaggletooth (Neonesthes capensis)
- Neonesthes microcephalus
- Odontostomias masticopogon
- Odontostomias micropogon
- Pachystomias microdon
- Photonectes braueri
- Photonectes caerulescens
- Photonectes margarita
- Photonectes mirabilis
- Photonectes parvimanus
- Photonectes phyllopogon
- Photostomias atrox
- Photostomias goodyeari
- Photostomias guernei
- Slender snaggletooth (Rhadinesthes decimus)
- Stomias affinis
- Boa dragonfish (Stomias boa)
- Stomias brevibarbatus
- Stomias lampropeltis
- Longbarb scaly dragonfish (Stomias longibarbatus)
- Thysanactis dentex
- Threelights dragonfish (Trigonolampa miriceps)

==== Gonostomatids ====
- Longray fangjaw (Bonapartia pedaliota)
- Bent-tooth bristlemouth (Cyclothone acclinidens)
- Pale bristlemouth (Cyclothone alba)
- Bent-tooth lightfish (Cyclothone braueri)
- Cyclothone livida
- Veiled anglemouth (Cyclothone microdon)
- Cyclothone obscura
- Bicolored bristlemouth (Cyclothone pallida)
- Shadow bristlemouth (Cyclothone parapallida)
- Slender bristlemouth (Cyclothone pseudopallida)
- Cyclothone pygmaea
- Pacific portholefish (Diplophos taenia)
- Gonostoma atlanticum
- Gonostoma denudatum
- Elongated bristlemouth fish (Gonostoma elongatum)
- Deepsea lightfish (Sigmops bathyphilus)
- Triplophos hemingi

==== Phosichthyids ====
- Bulldog lightfish (Ichthyococcus irregularis)
- Ovate lightfish (Ichthyococcus ovatus)
- Ichthyococcus polli
- Silver lightfish (Phosichthys argenteus)
- Stareye lightfish (Pollichthys mauli)
- Polymetme thaeocoryla
- Slender lightfish (Vinciguerria attenuata)
- Oceanic lightfish (Vinciguerria nimbaria)
- Power's deep-water bristle-mouth fish (Vinciguerria poweriae)
- Yarrella blackfordi

=== Cetomimiformes ===
- Velvet whalefish (Barbourisia rufa)
- Cetomimus teevani
- Savage's birdsnouted whalefish (Rhamphocetichthys savagei)
- Rondeletia bicolor
- Redmouth whalefish (Rondeletia loricata)

=== Myctophiformes ===
There are 98 species in the order Myctophiformes assessed as least concern.

==== Lanternfishes ====
- Glacier lantern fish (Benthosema glaciale)
- Skinnycheek lanternfish (Benthosema pterotum)
- Benthosema suborbitale
- Bolinichthys distofax
- Smoothcheek lanternfish (Bolinichthys indicus)
- Spurcheek lanternfish (Bolinichthys photothorax)
- Stubby lanternfish (Bolinichthys supralateralis)
- Centrobranchus nigroocellatus
- Madeira lantern fish (Ceratoscopelus maderensis)
- Warming's lantern fish (Ceratoscopelus warmingii)
- Andersen's lanternfish (Diaphus anderseni)
- Bertelsen's lanternfish (Diaphus bertelseni)
- Diaphus brachycephalus
- Crown lanternfish (Diaphus diadematus)
- Headlight fish (Diaphus effulgens)
- Diaphus fragilis
- Garman's lanternfish (Diaphus garmani)
- Small lantern fish (Diaphus holti)
- Diaphus hudsoni
- Diaphus lucidus
- Lutkens lanternfish (Diaphus luetkeni)
- Diaphus meadi
- Spothead lantern fish (Diaphus metopoclampus)
- Soft lanternfish (Diaphus mollis)
- Diaphus ostenfeldi
- Diaphus perspicillatus
- Problematic lanternfish (Diaphus problematicus)
- White-spotted lantern fish (Diaphus rafinesquii)
- Diaphus splendidus
- Diaphus termophilus
- Vanhoffen's lanternfish (Diaphus vanhoeffeni)
- Longfin lanternfish (Diogenichthys atlanticus)
- Electric lantern fish (Electrona risso)
- Gonichthys cocco
- Benoit's lanternfish (Hygophum benoiti)
- Bermuda lantern fish (Hygophum hygomii)
- Hygophum macrochir
- Firefly lanternfish (Hygophum proximum)
- Hygophum reinhardtii
- Hygophum taaningi
- Krefftichthys anderssoni
- Lampadena chavesi
- Lampadena luminosa
- Jordans lanternfish (Lampadena pontifex)
- Mirror lanternfish (Lampadena speculigera)
- Hector's lanternfish (Lampanyctodes hectoris)
- Lampanyctus alatus
- Southern lanternfish (Lampanyctus australis)
- Jewel lanternfish (Lampanyctus crocodilus)
- Lampanyctus festivus
- Diamondcheek lanternfish (Lampanyctus intricarius)
- Brokenline lanternfish (Lampanyctus jordani)
- Rakery beaconlamp (Lampanyctus macdonaldi)
- Noble lanternfish (Lampanyctus nobilis)
- Dotback lanternfish (Lampanyctus photonotus)
- Pygmy lanternfish (Lampanyctus pusillus)
- Lampanyctus tenuiformis
- Nacreous lanternfish (Lampanyctus vadulus)
- Lampichthys procerus
- Lepidophanes gaussi
- Lepidophanes guentheri
- Dofleini's lantern fish (Lobianchia dofleini)
- Gemellar's lanternfish (Lobianchia gemellarii)
- Barebelly lanternfish (Loweina interrupta)
- Rare lanternfish (Loweina rara)
- Myctophum affine
- Myctophum asperum
- Nightlight lanternfish (Myctophum lychnobium)
- Myctophum nitidulum
- Myctophum obtusirostre
- Myctophum phengodes
- Myctophum punctatum
- Myctophum selenops
- Spinose lanternfish (Myctophum spinosum)
- Dusky lanternfish (Nannobrachium atrum)
- Nannobrachium cuprarium
- Gibbs lanternfish (Nannobrachium gibbsi)
- Nannobrachium isaacsi
- Nannobrachium lineatum
- Wisner's lanternfish (Nannobrachium wisneri)
- Topside lampfish (Notolychnus valdiviae)
- Notoscopelus bolini
- Notoscopelus caudispinosus
- Notoscopelus elongatus
- Patchwork lampfish (Notoscopelus resplendens)
- Protomyctophum luciferum
- Scopelopsis multipunctatus
- Symbolophorus barnardi
- Symbolophorus boops
- Krefft's lanternfish (Symbolophorus kreffti)
- Rufous lanternfish (Symbolophorus rufinus)
- Large-scale lantern fish (Symbolophorus veranyi)
- Deepwater lanternfish (Taaningichthys bathyphilus)
- Taaningichthys minimus
- Taaningichthys paurolychnus

==== Neoscopelids ====
- Largescaled neoscopelid (Neoscopelus macrolepidotus)
- Sombre blackchin (Scopelengys tristis)
- Solivomer arenidens

=== Lampriformes ===
- Polka-dot ribbonfish (Desmodema polystictum)
- Unicorn crestfish (Eumecichthys fiski)
- Opah (Lampris guttatus)
- Crested oarfish (Lophotus lacepede)
- Tapertail (Radiicephalus elongatus)
- Giant oarfish (Regalecus glesne)
- Russell's oarfish (Regalecus russeli)
- Mediterranean dealfish (Trachipterus trachypterus)
- Scalloped ribbonfish (Zu cristatus)
- Scalloped dealfish (Zu elongatus)

=== Stylephoriformes ===
- Tube-eye (Stylephorus chordatus)

=== Other ray-finned fish species ===
- Eastern Pacific bonefish (Albula esuncula)
- Bowfin (Amia calva)
- Pacific jellynose fish (Ateleopus japonicus)
- Alligator gar (Atractosteus spatula)
- Tropical gar (Atractosteus tropicus)
- West African ladyfish (Elops lacerta)
- Elops machnata
- Northern ladyfish (Elops saurus)
- Jellynose (Guentherus altivela)
- Loppe's tadpole fish (Ijimaia loppei)
- Spotted gar (Lepisosteus oculatus)
- Longnose gar (Lepisosteus osseus)
- Shortnose gar (Lepisosteus platostomus)
- Florida gar (Lepisosteus platyrhincus)
- Stout beardfish (Polymixia nobilis)

== Hagfishes ==
- Eptatretus alastairi
- Eptatretus caribbeaus
- Eptatretus carlhubbsi
- New Zealand hagfish (Eptatretus cirrhatus)
- Guadalupe hagfish (Eptatretus fritzi)
- Eptatretus gomoni
- Eptatretus grouseri
- Sixgill hagfish (Eptatretus hexatrema)
- Eptatretus indrambaryai
- Eptatretus laurahubbsae
- Eptatretus mccoskeri
- Eptatretus mendozai
- Eptatretus menezesi
- Eptatretus multidens
- Eptatretus okinoseanus
- Fivegill hagfish (Eptatretus profundus)
- Cortez hagfish (Eptatretus sinus)
- Strickrott's hagfish (Eptatretus strickrotti)
- Eptatretus wisneri
- Patagonian hagfish (Myxine affinis)
- Southern hagfish (Myxine australis)
- Cape hagfish (Myxine capensis)
- Whiteface hagfish (Myxine circifrons)
- Fernholm’s hagfish (Myxine fernholmi)
- Atlantic hagfish (Myxine glutinosa)
- Myxine hubbsi
- White-headed hagfish (Myxine ios)
- Jespersen's hagfish (Myxine jespersenae)
- Myxine mccoskeri
- Caribbean hagfish (Myxine mcmillanae)
- Myxine robinsorum
- Paramyxine sheni
- Gulf hagfish (Paramyxine springeri)
- Paramyxine wisneri
- Paramyxine yangi

== See also ==
- Lists of IUCN Red List least concern species
- List of near threatened fishes
- List of vulnerable fishes
- List of endangered fishes
- List of critically endangered fishes
- List of recently extinct fishes
- List of data deficient fishes
- Sustainable seafood advisory lists and certification
