= Phyllonemus filinemus =

Conservation status
- Least Concern (IUCN 3.1)

Scientific classification
- Kingdom: Animalia
- Phylum: Chordata
- Class: Actinopterygii
- Order: Siluriformes
- Family: Claroteidae
- Genus: Phyllonemus
- Species: P. filinemus

Binomial name
- Phyllonemus filinemus Worthington & Ricardo, 1937

Species of fish

Phyllonemus filinemus is a species of claroteid catfish endemic to Lake Tanganyika on the border of the Democratic Republic of the Congo, Tanzania, Burundi and Zambia. It grows to a length of 8.7 cm (3.4 inches) TL.
