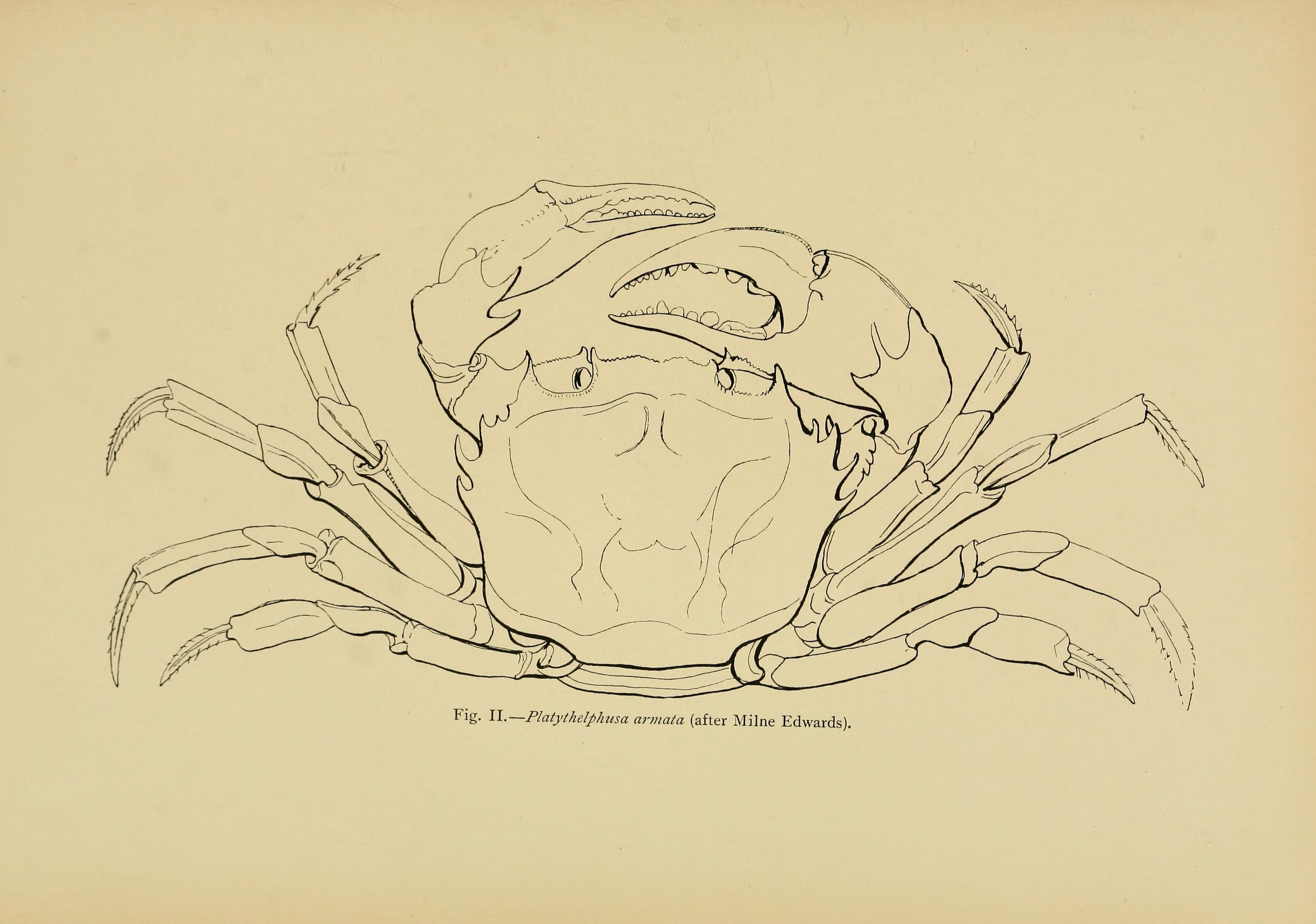
- Platythelphusa armata

Scientific classification
- Kingdom: Animalia
- Phylum: Arthropoda
- Clade: Pancrustacea
- Class: Malacostraca
- Order: Decapoda
- Suborder: Pleocyemata
- Infraorder: Brachyura
- Family: Potamonautidae
- Subfamily: Potamonautinae
- Genus: Platythelphusa; A. Milne-Edwards, 1887

Type species
- Platythelphusa armata A. Milne-Edwards, 1887

Species
- Platythelphusa armata A. Milne-Edwards, 1887; Platythelphusa conculcata (Cunnington, 1907); Platythelphusa denticulata Capart, 1952; Platythelphusa echinata (Capart, 1952); Platythelphusa immaculata Marijnissen, Schram, Cumberlidge & Michel, 2004; Platythelphusa maculata (Cunnington, 1899); Platythelphusa polita (Capart, 1952); Platythelphusa praelongata Marijnissen, Schram, Cumberlidge & Michel, 2004; Platythelphusa tuberculata (Capart, 1952)

= Platythelphusa =

Genus of crabs

Platythelphusa is a genus of freshwater crabs endemic to Lake Tanganyika. It has been placed in a number of families, including a monotypic family, Platythelphusidae, as well as Potamidae and its current position in the Potamonautidae, and has also been treated as a subgenus of Potamonautes. It forms a monophyletic group, possibly nested within the genus Potamonautes, which would therefore be paraphyletic. The genus is the only evolutionary radiation of crabs to have occurred in a freshwater lake, and it occurred recently, probably since the Pliocene. This parallels the better known radiation of cichlid fishes in Lake Tanganyika. Only one other species of freshwater crab is found in Lake Tanganyika, Potamonautes platynotus.

== Taxonomic history ==
The first freshwater crab to be described from Lake Tanganyika, by Alphonse Milne-Edwards in 1887, was considered so distinct from the other crabs known up to that time that it was placed in a new genus, as Platythelphusa armata. Twelve years later, a second species was described by W. A. Cunnington, leader of the third Tanganyika Expedition, and was also placed in a separate genus, as Limnothelphusa maculata. The same author later described a third species, Platythelphusa conculata, and eventually realised that all three belonged to the same genus, reducing Limnothelphusa to a taxonomic synonym.

In 1952, Capart did not recognise the species P. conculcata, but added four new species, P. denticulata, P. echinata, P. polita and P. tuberculata. Since that time, P. conculcata has been restored, and two new species have been described, P. immaculata and P. praelongata.

== Distribution ==
All nine species live in relatively shallow waters around the edge of Lake Tanganyika. While four countries border Lake Tanganyika (Burundi, Democratic Republic of the Congo, Tanzania and Zambia), only two species have been found in all four countries, P. armata and P. conculcata. One species, P. polita, has been found in all except Zambia; two (P. echinata and P. tuberculata) have been found in Burundi and Tanzania; one has been found in Tanzania and Zambia (P. maculata); one is only known from Zambia (P. praelongata) and two have only been seen in Tanzania (P. denticulata and P. immaculata). However, many of the species are poorly known, and their true distributions may be wider than is currently known.

== Species ==
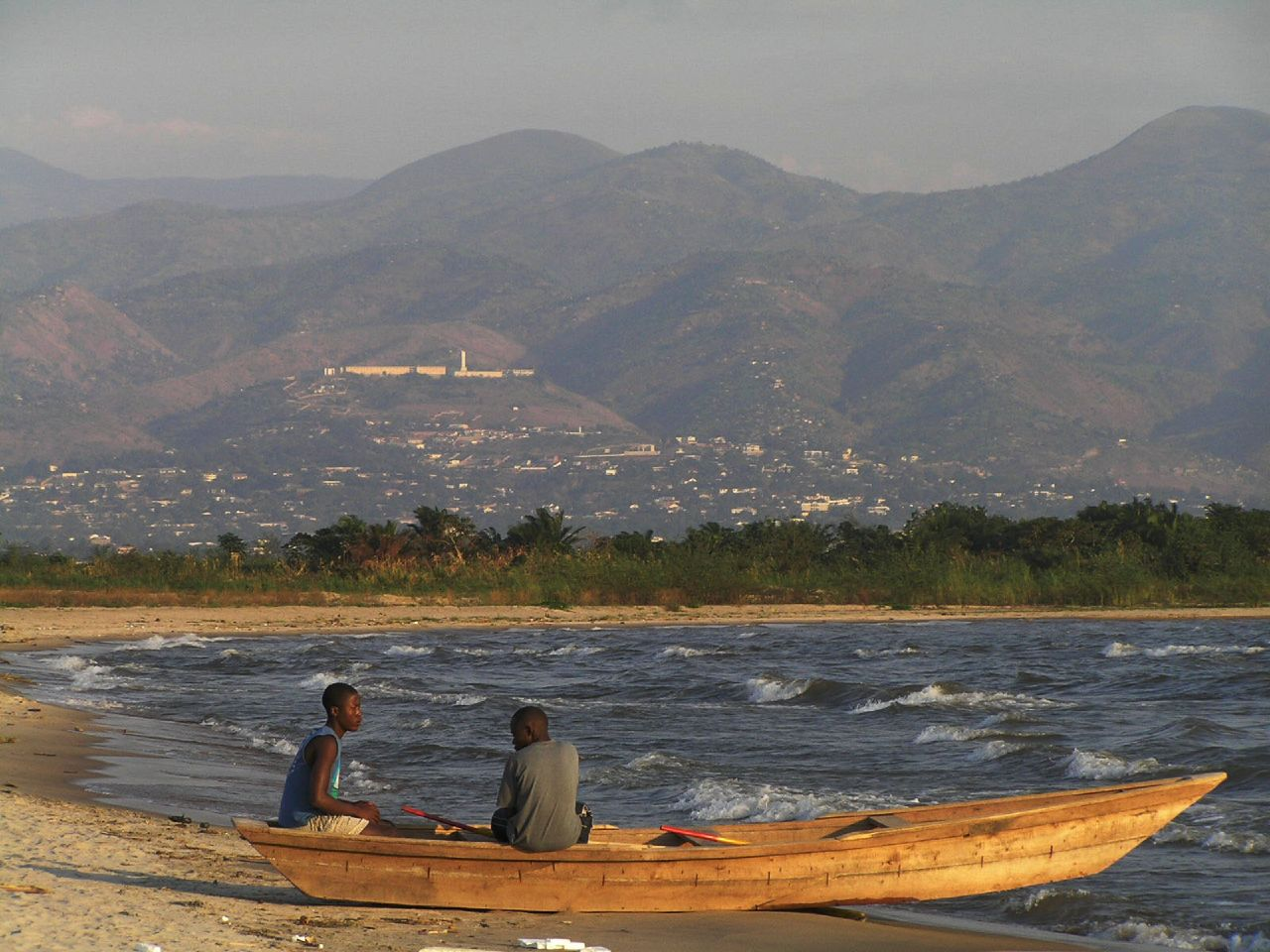
Fishermen on Lake Tanganyika

=== Platythelphusa armata ===
As the largest species in the genus (up to 6 cm or 2.4 in in carapace width), Platythelphusa armata, the armored platythelphusa, is subject to small-scale fishery. Adults live at depths of 5–30 metres (16–98 ft), while juveniles live at depths of 1–10 metres (3.3–32.8 ft), and often inhabit discarded Neothauma tanganyicense shells. The species is listed as Least Concern by the IUCN.

=== Platythelphusa conculcata ===
Platythelphusa conculcata is found at depths of 20–60 metres (66–197 ft), and is listed as Least Concern by the IUCN.

=== Platythelphusa denticulata ===
Platythelphusa denticulata is known from few sites, all in Tanzania. Though it may have a low population, there is no evidence of a decline and it is listed as Least Concern by the IUCN.

=== Platythelphusa echinata ===
Platythelphusa echinata is found at depths of 5–30 metres (16–98 ft) on the Tanzanian and Burundian shores of Lake Tanganyika. It lives where the substrate is rocky or sandy, and occasionally uses old Neothauma shells.

=== Platythelphusa immaculata ===
Platythelphusa immaculata is known from only 25 specimens, but is listed as Least Concern, because there are no apparent threats to its survival.

=== Platythelphusa maculata ===
Platythelphusa maculata, the maculated platythelphusa, lives on sand and rocks, and occasionally in Neothauma shells, at depths of 1–60 metres (3.3–196.9 ft), and is listed as Least Concern.

=== Platythelphusa polita ===
Platythelphusa polita lives on sand and rocks, and occasionally in Neothauma shells, at depths of 5–60 metres (16–197 ft), and is listed as Least Concern.

=== Platythelphusa praelongata ===
Platythelphusa praelongata lives at the greatest depth of any Platythelphusa species, the single known specimen having been collected at 40–80 metres (130–260 ft), around Mbita Island, and is listed as Data Deficient.

=== Platythelphusa tuberculata ===
Platythelphusa tuberculata, the wart platythelphusa, has longer legs than the other species, and lives at the northern end of Lake Tanganyika, on muddy substrates. It has been found in the stomachs of fish including Chrysichthys brachynema and Bathybagrus stappersii (formerly Chrysichthys stappersii).
