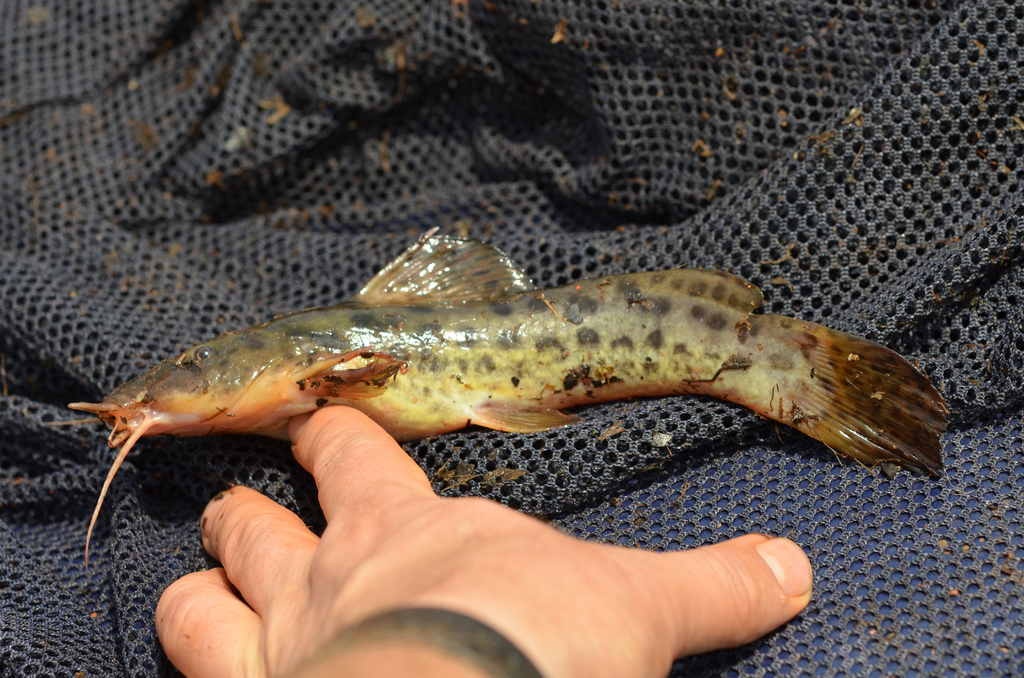

Conservation status
- Least Concern (IUCN 3.1)

Scientific classification
- Kingdom: Animalia
- Phylum: Chordata
- Class: Actinopterygii
- Order: Siluriformes
- Family: Auchenoglanididae
- Genus: Notoglanidium
- Species: N. macrostoma

Binomial name
- Notoglanidium macrostoma (Pellegrin, 1909)

Synonyms
- Auchenoglanis macrostoma Pellegrin, 1909; Anaspidoglanis macrostoma (Pellegrin, 1909); Anaspidoglanis macrostomus (Pellegrin, 1909); Parauchenoglanis macrostoma (Pellegrin, 1909); Parauchenoglanis ansorgii Boulenger, 1912

= Notoglanidium macrostoma =

Species of fish

Notoglanidium macrostoma, also called the flatnose catfish and dwarf giraffe catfish is a species of claroteid catfish found in rivers in Angola, Cameroon, the Democratic Republic of the Congo, the Republic of the Congo and Gabon. It is active during twilight and at night and its diet consists of small fishes, crustaceans and insect larvae. It grows to a length of 24.0 cm (9.4 inches) TL.
