= Notoglanidium depierrei =

Conservation status
- Data Deficient (IUCN 3.1)

Scientific classification
- Kingdom: Animalia
- Phylum: Chordata
- Class: Actinopterygii
- Order: Siluriformes
- Family: Auchenoglanididae
- Genus: Notoglanidium
- Species: N. depierrei

Binomial name
- Notoglanidium depierrei (Daget, 1979)

Synonyms
- Platyglanis depierrei ^{Daget, 1979}

Species of fish

Notoglanidium depierrei is a species of catfish (order Siluriformes) family Claroteidae. This species is endemic to Cameroon where it is known only from its type locality of the Sanaga River Basin. It reaches a length of about 17.2 centimetres (6.8 in) SL. It was formerly considered to be the sole member of the monotypic genus Platyglanis but this has now been synonymised with Notoglanidium.
