= Notoglanidium boutchangai =

Conservation status
- Least Concern (IUCN 3.1)

Scientific classification
- Kingdom: Animalia
- Phylum: Chordata
- Class: Actinopterygii
- Order: Siluriformes
- Family: Auchenoglanididae
- Genus: Notoglanidium
- Species: N. boutchangai

Binomial name
- Notoglanidium boutchangai (Thys van den Audenaerde, 1965)

Synonyms
- Parauchenoglanis boutchangai Thys van den Audenaerde, 1965; Anaspidoglanis boutchangai (Thys van den Audenaerde, 1965)

Species of fish

Notoglanidium boutchangai is a species of catfish in the family Claroteid.

== Location ==
Notoglanidium boutchangai can be found in the Ogooué River basin of Gabon and the Kouilou River basin in the Republic of the Congo.

== Size ==
It reaches a length of 22.5 cm (8.9 in) TL.

== Information ==
Notoglanidium boutchangai is considered to be of least concern to becoming an endangered species. The main threats that negatively affect this species by decreasing its population in their habitat include deforestation for timber, gold mining, and the construction of dams. Even though there are threats, none of them are decreasing the population in a dramatic way. There are no conservation measures being done to help conserve the species. The common name of Notoglanidium boutchangai in French is Bambonga.

== Habitat ==
Notoglanidium boutchangai is recorded to live in a freshwater environment. They can be located in a tropical environment. This species populates in rivers.

== Characteristics ==
Notoglanidium boutchangai is known to have a wide and flat head along with a rounded snout. The eyes are located on the backside of the head. The main color of this species is usually a reddish-brown color.
