= Chrysichthys platycephalus =

Bathybagrus platycephalus

Conservation status
- Least Concern (IUCN 3.1)

Scientific classification
- Kingdom: Animalia
- Phylum: Chordata
- Class: Actinopterygii
- Division: Teleostei
- Order: Siluriformes
- Family: Claroteidae
- Genus: Chrysichthys
- Species: C. platycephalus

Binomial name
- Chrysichthys platycephalus Worthington & Ricardo, 1937

Synonyms
- Bathybagrus platycephalus (Worthington & Ricardo, 1937)

Species of fish

Chrysichthys platycephalus is a species of claroteid catfish endemic to Lake Tanganyika on the border of Burundi, the Democratic Republic of the Congo, Tanzania, and Zambia. It grows to a length of 22 centimetres (8.7 in) in total length. It is fished locally, especially in Burundi.

== Taxonomy ==
Chrysichthys platycephalus was first described by Edgar Barton Worthington and Kate Bertram in 1937. It is classified in the Claroteidae family in the order Siluriformes (the catfishes). It has also been referred to by Bathybagrus platycephalus.

== Distribution ==
This species is endemic (native to only a single location) to East Africa's Lake Tanganyika, on the border of Burundi, the Democratic Republic of the Congo, Tanzania, and Zambia.

== Ecology ==
Chrysichthys platycephalus is a demersal fish that lives at depths of 20–110 metres (70–360 ft). It grows to a maximum of 22 cm (8.7 in) in total length. It occurs in the littoral zone and prefers rocky substrates. It is assessed as a least concern species by the IUCN Red List, which notes that while the species faces localized pressure from fisheries and siltation, the concerns are not present throughout all of Lake Tanganyika. Agricultural and forestry runoff represents an additional threat. Studies to determine an estimated population size have not been conducted. It is most notably fished in Burundi; annual catches are variable, ranging between one ton and 12 tons of fish taken per year between 2011 and 2018, peaking in 2015 and ebbing in 2012, 2013, and 2016.
