= Notoglanidium akiri =

Conservation status
- Endangered (IUCN 3.1)

Scientific classification
- Kingdom: Animalia
- Phylum: Chordata
- Class: Actinopterygii
- Order: Siluriformes
- Family: Auchenoglanididae
- Genus: Notoglanidium
- Species: N. akiri

Binomial name
- Notoglanidium akiri (Risch, 1987)

Synonyms
- Auchenoglanis akiri Risch, 1987; Anaspidoglanis akiri (Risch, 1987); Parauchenoglanis akiri (Risch, 1987)

Species of fish

Notoglanidium akiri is a species of claroteid catfish endemic to Nigeria where it occurs in the Niger Delta and the New Calabar and Bonny Rivers. It reaches a length of 10.7 cm (4.2 inches) SL.
