= African bullhead =

Conservation status
- Least Concern (IUCN 3.1)

Scientific classification
- Kingdom: Animalia
- Phylum: Chordata
- Class: Actinopterygii
- Order: Siluriformes
- Family: Claroteidae
- Genus: Lophiobagrus
- Species: L. cyclurus

Binomial name
- Lophiobagrus cyclurus (Worthington & Ricardo, 1937)

Synonyms
- Chrysichthys cyclurus Worthington & Ricardo, 1937; Lophiobagrus lestradei Poll, 1942

Species of fish

The African bullhead (Lophiobagrus cyclurus) is a species of claroteid catfish endemic to Lake Tanganyika at the border of Burundi, the Democratic Republic of the Congo, Tanzania, and Zambia. This species grows to a length of 8.0 centimetres (3.1 in) TL.

This species is nocturnal in habit, hiding amongst rocks during daylight hours. The diet consists of small crustaceans, beetle larvae and chironomid larvae. The mucus secreted by this species is toxic to other fishes.
