= Phyllonemus brichardi =

Scientific classification
- Kingdom: Animalia
- Phylum: Chordata
- Class: Actinopterygii
- Order: Siluriformes
- Family: Claroteidae
- Genus: Phyllonemus
- Species: P. brichardi

Binomial name
- Phyllonemus brichardi Risch, 1987

Species of fish

Phyllonemus brichardi also known as kapondo or the spatula-barbeled catfish, is a species of claroteid catfish endemic to Lake Tanganyika. It is only known from the type locality, which is the eastern shore of the Ubwari Peninsula on the Congo side of Lake Tanganyika.

== Etymology ==
The fish is named in honor of aquarium-fish exporter Pierre Brichard (1921-1990), who collected the type specimen.

== Habitat ==
It lives under large boulders in shallow water.

== Diet ==
It primarily feeds on small invertebrates and fish.

== Description ==
This species reaches a length of 7.8 cm (3.1 in) TL. It has a distinctive appearance, with large eyes, leaf-like tips on its maxillary barbels, and a long adipose fin.

== Reproduction ==
It is also one of the few catfishes that practice mouthbrooding, meaning both parents carry the eggs or young in their mouths for protection.
