= Bathyclarias longibarbis =

Conservation status
- Least Concern (IUCN 3.1)

Scientific classification
- Kingdom: Animalia
- Phylum: Chordata
- Class: Actinopterygii
- Division: Teleostei
- Order: Siluriformes
- Family: Clariidae
- Genus: Bathyclarias
- Species: B. longibarbis

Binomial name
- Bathyclarias longibarbis (Worthington, 1933)

Synonyms
- Clarias longibarbis

Species of fish

Bathyclarias longibarbis is a species of airbreathing catfish endemic to Lake Malawi, in the countries of Malawi, Mozambique and Tanzania. This species grows to a length of 76 cm (30 in) TL. This species is commercially caught for human consumption.
