= Lophiobagrus brevispinis =

Conservation status
- Least Concern (IUCN 3.1)

Scientific classification
- Kingdom: Animalia
- Phylum: Chordata
- Class: Actinopterygii
- Order: Siluriformes
- Family: Claroteidae
- Genus: Lophiobagrus
- Species: L. brevispinis

Binomial name
- Lophiobagrus brevispinis R. M. Bailey & D. J. Stewart, 1984

Species of fish

Lophiobagrus brevispinis is a species of claroteid catfish endemic to Lake Tanganyika at the border of Burundi, the Democratic Republic of the Congo, Tanzania, and Zambia. This species grows to a length of 5.1 cm (2.0 inches) TL.
