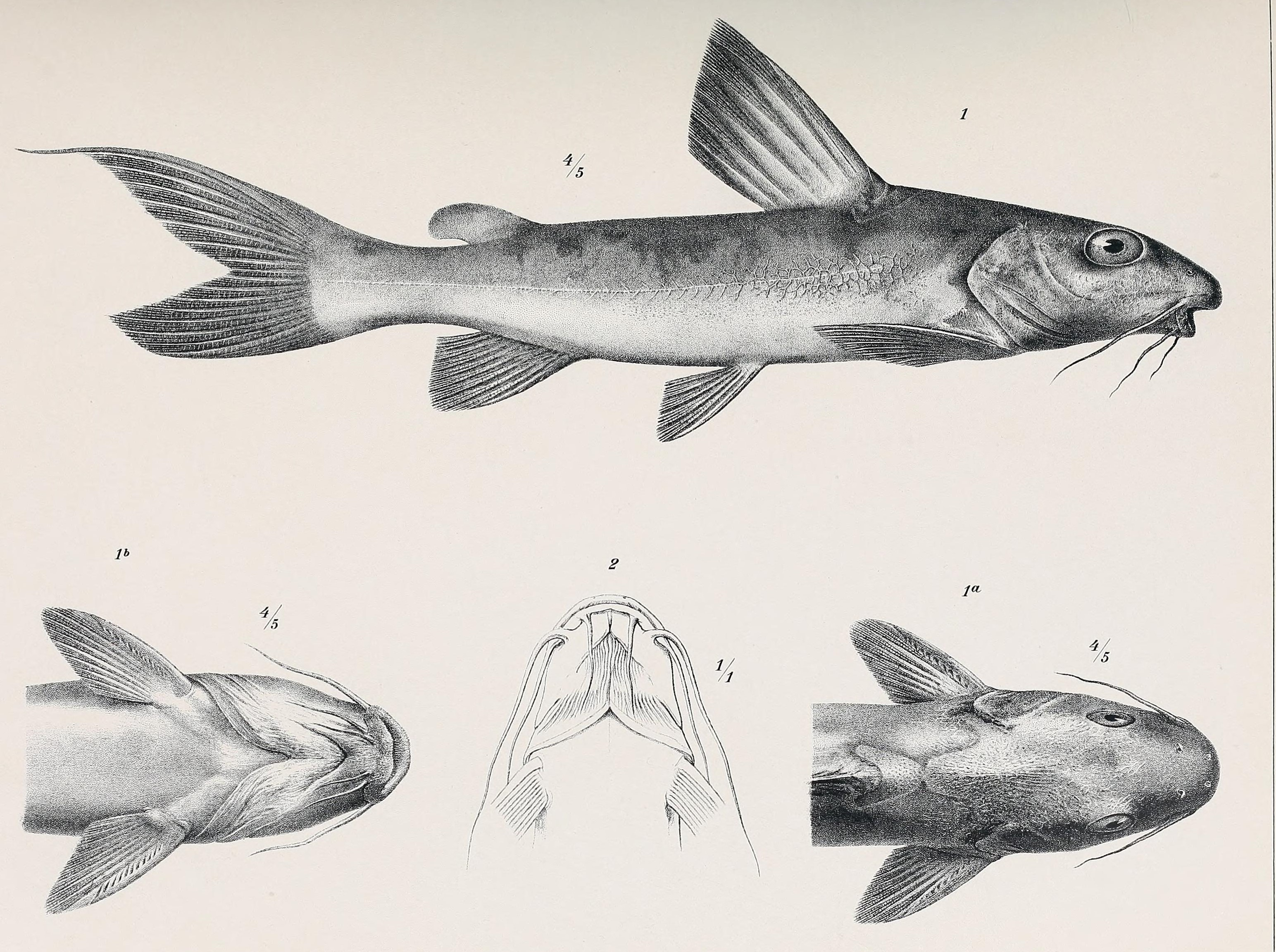
- An illustration of Gephyroglanis habereri

Conservation status
- Data Deficient (IUCN 3.1)

Scientific classification
- Kingdom: Animalia
- Phylum: Chordata
- Class: Actinopterygii
- Order: Siluriformes
- Family: Claroteidae
- Genus: Gephyroglanis
- Species: G. habereri

Binomial name
- Gephyroglanis habereri Steindachner, 1912

= Gephyroglanis habereri =

Species of fish

Gephyroglanis habereri is a species of claroteid catfish endemic to Cameroon where it is only known from the Dja River. This species grows to a length of 20.2 cm (8.0 in) SL.
