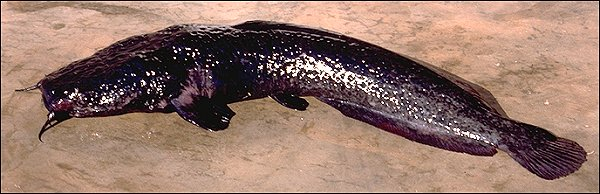
- Bathyclarias foveolatus

Scientific classification
- Domain: Eukaryota
- Kingdom: Animalia
- Phylum: Chordata
- Class: Actinopterygii
- Order: Siluriformes
- Family: Clariidae
- Genus: Bathyclarias; P. B. N. Jackson, 1959

Type species
- Clarias longibarbis Worthington, 1933

Species
- See text.

= Bathyclarias =

Genus of fishes

Bathyclarias is a genus of airbreathing catfish endemic to Lake Malawi in Africa. Several are components of local commercial fisheries.

== Species ==
There are currently contains eight recognized species:

- Bathyclarias atribranchus (Greenwood, 1961)
- Bathyclarias eurydon P. B. N. Jackson, 1959
- Bathyclarias filicibarbis P. B. N. Jackson, 1959
- Bathyclarias foveolatus (P. B. N. Jackson, 1955)
- Bathyclarias longibarbis (Worthington, 1933)
- Bathyclarias nyasensis (Worthington, 1933)
- Bathyclarias rotundifrons P. B. N. Jackson, 1959
- Bathyclarias worthingtoni P. B. N. Jackson, 1959
