= Broadband barb =

Conservation status
- Least Concern (IUCN 3.1)

Scientific classification
- Domain: Eukaryota
- Kingdom: Animalia
- Phylum: Chordata
- Class: Actinopterygii
- Order: Cypriniformes
- Family: Cyprinidae
- Subfamily: Smiliogastrinae
- Genus: Enteromius
- Species: E. macrotaenia

Binomial name
- Enteromius macrotaenia (Worthington, 1933)

Synonyms
- Barbus macrotaenia Worthington, 1933

Species of fish

The broadband barb (Enteromius macrotaenia) is a species of cyprinid fish in the genus Enteromius. It is found in Lake Malawi and the lower Zambezi, Pungwe River and Buzi River. The broadband barb is exploited for human consumption and for the aquarium trade.
