= Chrysichthys sianenna =

Conservation status
- Least Concern (IUCN 3.1)

Scientific classification
- Kingdom: Animalia
- Phylum: Chordata
- Class: Actinopterygii
- Division: Teleostei
- Order: Siluriformes
- Family: Claroteidae
- Genus: Chrysichthys
- Species: C. sianenna

Binomial name
- Chrysichthys sianenna Boulenger, 1906

Synonyms
- Bathybagrus sianenna (Boulenger, 1906)

Species of fish

Chrysichthys sianenna is a species of claroteid catfish endemic to Lake Tanganyika on the border of Burundi, the Democratic Republic of the Congo, Tanzania, and Zambia. Its natural habitats are rivers and freshwater lakes. It grows to a length of 23 cm (9.1 in) SL and is a component of local subsistence fisheries.
