= Lophiobagrus =

Scientific classification
- Domain: Eukaryota
- Kingdom: Animalia
- Phylum: Chordata
- Class: Actinopterygii
- Order: Siluriformes
- Family: Claroteidae
- Subfamily: Claroteinae
- Genus: Lophiobagrus; Poll, 1942

Type species
- Lophiobagrus lestradei Poll, 1942

Species
- See text.

Genus of fishes

Lophiobagrus is a genus of catfish in the family Claroteidae. They are endemic to Lake Tanganyika in Africa.

== Species ==
There are currently four recognized species in this genus:

- Lophiobagrus aquilus R. M. Bailey & D. J. Stewart, 1984
- Lophiobagrus asperispinis R. M. Bailey & D. J. Stewart, 1984
- Lophiobagrus brevispinis R. M. Bailey & D. J. Stewart, 1984
- Lophiobagrus cyclurus (Worthington & Ricardo, 1937) – African bullhead
