= Spatula-barbeled catfish =

Conservation status
- Least Concern (IUCN 3.1)

Scientific classification
- Kingdom: Animalia
- Phylum: Chordata
- Class: Actinopterygii
- Order: Siluriformes
- Family: Claroteidae
- Genus: Phyllonemus
- Species: P. typus

Binomial name
- Phyllonemus typus Boulenger, 1906

Species of fish

The spatula-barbeled catfish (Phyllonemus typus) is a species of claroteid catfish endemic to Lake Tanganyika on the border of the Democratic Republic of the Congo, Tanzania, Burundi and Zambia. It grows to a length of 8.8 cm (3.5 inches) TL.
