= Gephyroglanis congicus =

Conservation status
- Least Concern (IUCN 3.1)

Scientific classification
- Kingdom: Animalia
- Phylum: Chordata
- Class: Actinopterygii
- Order: Siluriformes
- Family: Claroteidae
- Genus: Gephyroglanis
- Species: G. congicus

Binomial name
- Gephyroglanis congicus Boulenger, 1899

Species of fish

Gephyroglanis congicus is a species of claroteid catfish endemic to the Democratic Republic of the Congo where it is found in the Congo River system. This species grows to a length of 43 cm (17 in) SL.
