= Amarginops platus =

Conservation status
- Data Deficient (IUCN 3.1)

Scientific classification
- Kingdom: Animalia
- Phylum: Chordata
- Class: Actinopterygii
- Order: Siluriformes
- Family: Claroteidae
- Genus: Amarginops; Nichols & Griscom, 1917
- Species: A. platus

Binomial name
- Amarginops platus Nichols & Griscom, 1917

Species of fish

Amarginops platus is a species of claroteid catfish endemic to the Democratic Republic of the Congo where it is only found around Kisangani. It lives in river rapids and grows to a length of 17.0 cm (6.7 in) SL.
