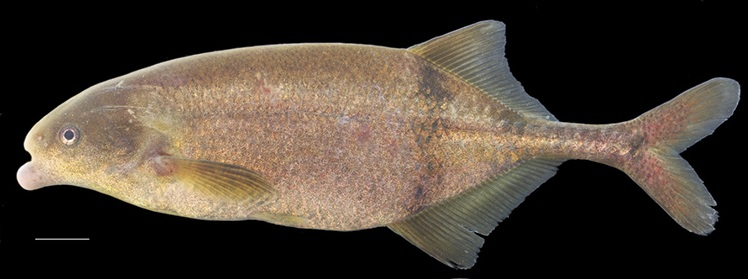
- Marcusenius moorii

Scientific classification
- Kingdom: Animalia
- Phylum: Chordata
- Class: Actinopterygii
- Order: Osteoglossiformes
- Family: Mormyridae
- Genus: Marcusenius; T. N. Gill, 1862

Type species
- Mormyrus anguilloides Linnaeus, 1758

= Marcusenius =

Genus of ray-finned fishes

Marcusenius is a genus of the elephantfish group native to Africa. Its members are highly diverse in size, with the smallest species reaching less than 15 cm (6 in) and the largest more than 1 m (3.3 ft).

The genus is named after Johann Marcusen.

== Species ==
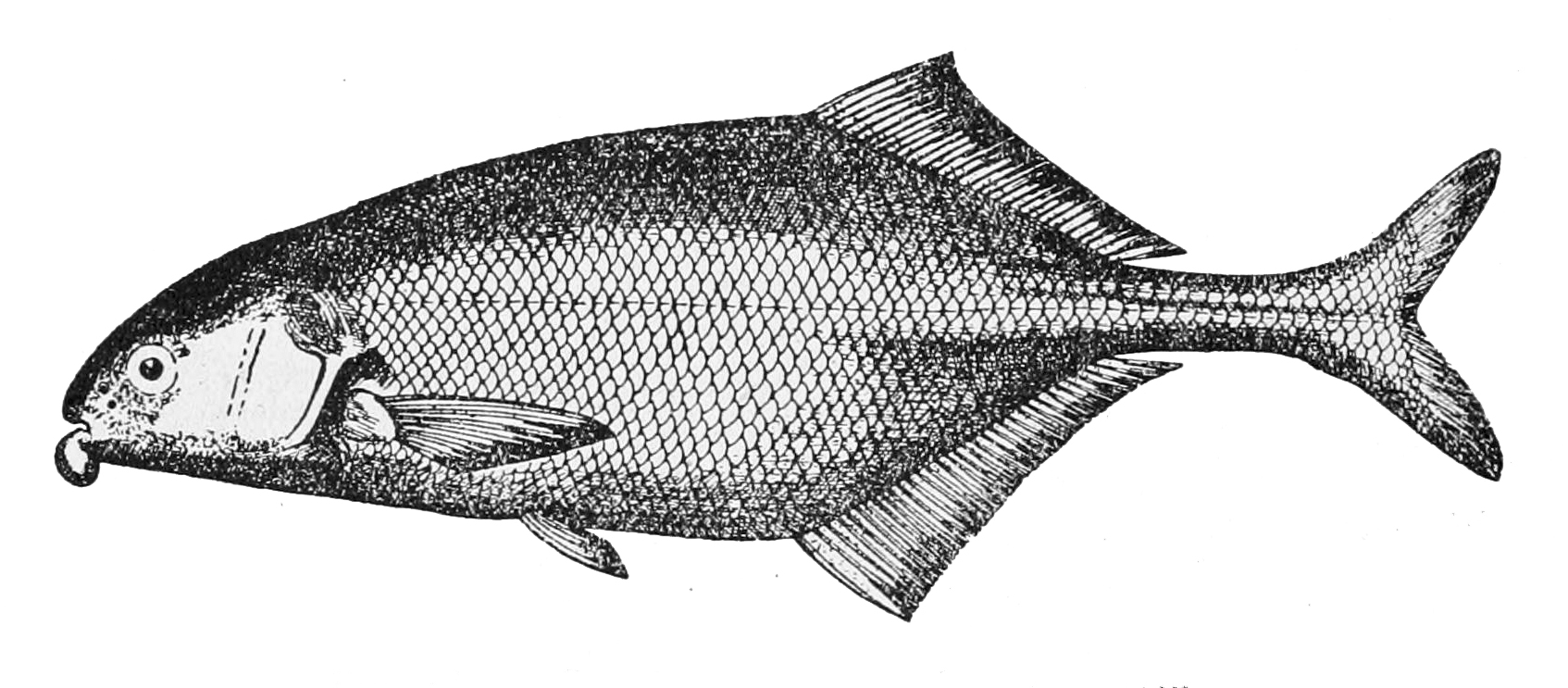
Marcusenius furcidens

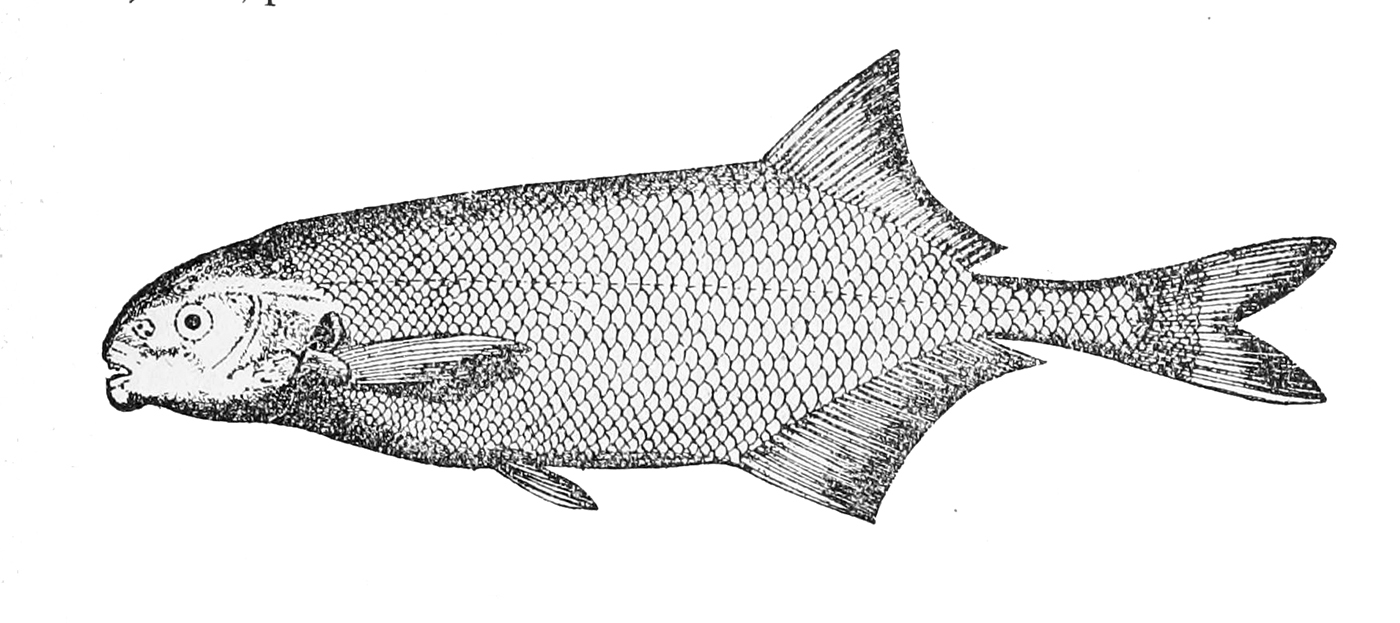
Marcusenius ussheri

There are currently 45 recognized species in this genus:

- Marcusenius abadii (Boulenger, 1901) (Djebba mormyrid)
- Marcusenius altisambesi B. J. Kramer, P. H. Skelton, van der Bank & Wink, 2007 (bulldog)
- Marcusenius angolensis (Boulenger, 1905) (Quanza mormyrid)
- Marcusenius annamariae (Parenzan, 1939) (Annamaria mormyrid)
- Marcusenius bentleyi (Boulenger, 1897) (Bentley's mormyrid)
- Marcusenius caudisquamatus Maake, Gon & E. R. Swartz, 2014 (Mhlatuze mormyrid)
- Marcusenius cuangoanus (Poll, 1967) (Zovo mormyrid)
- Marcusenius cyprinoides (Linnaeus, 1758) (thicklipped trunkfish)
- Marcusenius deboensis (Daget, 1954) (Debo mormyrid)
- Marcusenius desertus B. J. Kramer, van der Bank & Wunk, 2016 (Cunene elephantfish)
- Marcusenius devosi B. J. Kramer, P. H. Skelton, van der Bank & Wink, 2007 (Wenje mormyrid)
- Marcusenius dundoensis (Poll 1967) (Dundo mormyrid)
- Marcusenius elegans Fricke & B. J. Kramer, 2022
- Marcusenius friteli (Pellegrin, 1904) (Alima mormyrid)
- Marcusenius furcidens (Pellegrin, 1920) (Ivory Coast mormyrid)
- Marcusenius fuscus (Pellegrin, 1901)
- Marcusenius ghesquierei (Poll, 1945) (Busira mormyrid)
- Marcusenius greshoffii (Schilthuis, 1891) (Greshoff's mormyrid)
- Marcusenius intermedius Pellegrin, 1924 (Kasai mormyrid)
- Marcusenius johncygnar Boulenger, 1902 (Molas mormyrid)
- Marcusenius kainjii D. S. C. Lewis 1974 (Lowa elephantfish)
- Marcusenius kaninginii Kisekelwa Boden, Snoeks & Vreven 2016
- Marcusenius krameri Maake, Gon & E. R. Swartz, 2014 (Kramer's mormyrid)
- Marcusenius kutuensis (Boulenger, 1899) (Kutu Island mormyrid)
- Marcusenius lambouri (Pellegrin, 1904)
- Marcusenius leopoldianus (Boulenger, 1899) (Ibali Island mormyrid)
- Marcusenius livingstonii (Boulenger, 1899) (Livingston's bulldog)
- Marcusenius lucombesi Maake, Gon & E. R. Swartz, 2014 (Lucombe mormyrid)
- Marcusenius macrolepidotus (W. K. H. Peters, 1852) (Bulldog)
- Marcusenius macrophthalmus (Pellegrin, 1924) (Tshikapa mormyrid)
- Marcusenius mento (Boulenger, 1890)
- Marcusenius meronai Bigorne & Paugy 1990 (Sierra Leone mormyrid)
- Marcusenius monteiri (Günther 1873) (Monteiri's bulldog)
- Marcusenius moorii (Günther, 1867) (Talagouga mormyrid)
- Marcusenius multisquamatus B. J. Kramer & Wink, 2013 (Epupa Falls mormyrid)
- Marcusenius ntemensis (Pellegrin, 1927) (Ntem mormyrid)
- Marcusenius pongolensis (Fowler, 1934) (Southern bulldog)
- Marcusenius sanagaensis Boden, Teugels & C. D. Hopkins, 1997 (Cameroon mormyrid)
- Marcusenius schilthuisiae (Boulenger, 1899) (Kutu mormyrid)
- Marcusenius senegalensis (Steindachner, 1870) (Trunkfish; Senegalese mormyrid)
- Marcusenius stanleyanus (Boulenger, 1897) (Boyoma mormyrid)
- Marcusenius thomasi (Boulenger, 1916) (Sherbo mormyrid)
- Marcusenius ussheri (Günther, 1867) (Bossumprah mormyrid)
- Marcusenius victoriae (Worthington 1929) (Victoria stonebasher)
- Marcusenius wamuinii Decru, Sullivan & Vreven, 2019
