= Salmontail catfish =

Salmontail catfish is a name used for:

- Kibonde, Chrysichthys brachynema
- Arius graeffei, Arius leptaspis, and other catfish of Arius
