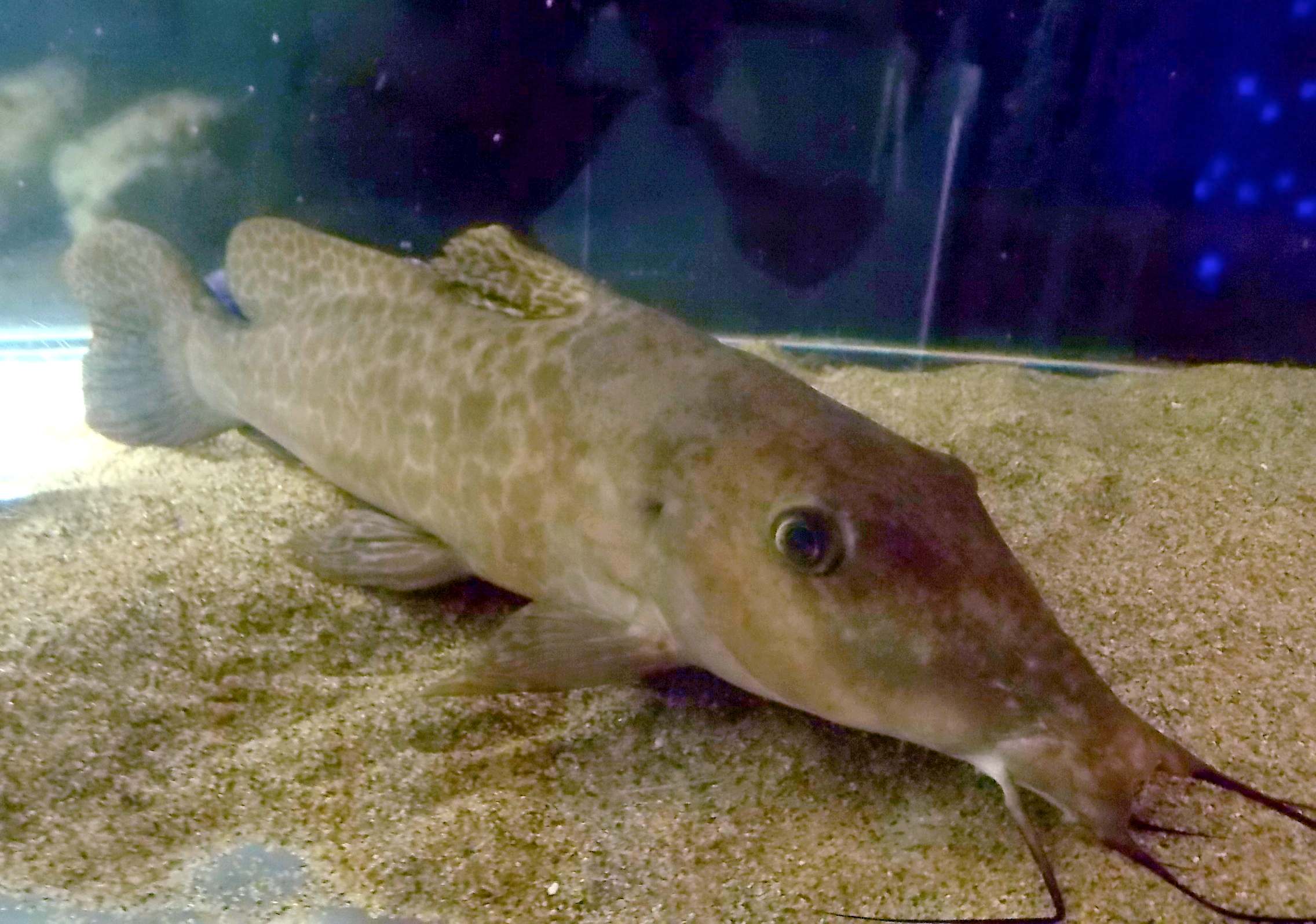
- Auchenoglanis occidentalis

Scientific classification
- Domain: Eukaryota
- Kingdom: Animalia
- Phylum: Chordata
- Class: Actinopterygii
- Order: Siluriformes
- Family: Claroteidae
- Subfamily: Auchenoglanidinae
- Genus: Auchenoglanis; Günther, 1865

Type species
- Pimelodus biscutatus É. Geoffroy St. Hilaire, 1809

= Auchenoglanis =

Auchenoglanis Temporal range: Upper Miocene - Recent

Genus of fishes

Auchenoglanis is a genus of relatively large, up to 70 cm (2.3 ft) SL, claroteid catfishes native to various freshwater habitats in Africa.

Auchenoglanis is a primitive member of the subfamily Auchenoglanidinae (also includes Notoglanidium and Parauchenoglanis) and represents a stem group.

Species of this genus occur predominantly in the Nilo-Sudan region and Western Africa, but also in the Congo River, Lakes Albert and Tanganyika.

Auchenoglanis species mainly feed on insect aquatic larvae and eventually on small mollusks, alevin, and swimming insects. These feeding habits should also enable them to stand a relatively wide range of ecological conditions.

== Living species ==
Following a taxonomic review in 1991, only two living species (marked with a star* in the list) were recognized in this genus. This is followed by FishBase and Catalog of Fishes. However, review in 2010 suggested that there are six additional species, which would bring the total to eight. Genetic studies indicate that additional, currently unrecognized species exist.

- Auchenoglanis acuticeps Pappenheim, 1914
- Auchenoglanis biscutatus* (É. Geoffroy Saint-Hilaire, 1809)
- Auchenoglanis occidentalis* (Valenciennes, 1840) (Bubu)
- Auchenoglanis sacchii (Vinciguerra, 1898)
- Auchenoglanis senegali Retzer, 2010
- Auchenoglanis tanganicanus Boulenger, 1906
- Auchenoglanis tchadiensis Pellegrin, 1909
- Auchenoglanis wittei Giltay, 1930

== Fossil species ==
Auchenoglanis is rare in the fossil record compared to other African catfishes. Auchenoglanis includes an extinct species, Auchenoglanis soye from Western Chad. A few other fossils are also attributed to Auchenoglanis with no specific species described.
