= Lophiobagrus aquilus =

Conservation status
- Least Concern (IUCN 3.1)

Scientific classification
- Kingdom: Animalia
- Phylum: Chordata
- Class: Actinopterygii
- Order: Siluriformes
- Family: Claroteidae
- Genus: Lophiobagrus
- Species: L. aquilus

Binomial name
- Lophiobagrus aquilus R. M. Bailey & D. J. Stewart, 1984

Species of fish

Lophiobagrus aquilus is a species of claroteid catfish endemic to Lake Tanganyika at the border of Burundi, the Democratic Republic of the Congo, Tanzania, and Zambia. This species grows to a length of 8.0 cm (3.1 inches) TL.

This species is nocturnal in habits, hiding amongst rocks during daylight hours. Eggs and young are mouth-brooded by the male.
