= Phyllonemus =

Scientific classification
- Domain: Eukaryota
- Kingdom: Animalia
- Phylum: Chordata
- Class: Actinopterygii
- Order: Siluriformes
- Family: Claroteidae
- Subfamily: Claroteinae
- Genus: Phyllonemus; Boulenger, 1906

Type species
- Phyllonemus typus Boulenger, 1906

Species
- See text.

Genus of fishes

Phyllonemus is a genus of claroteid catfish native to Africa where it is only found in Lake Tanganyika.

== Species ==
This genus currently contains three recognized species:

- Phyllonemus brichardi Risch, 1987
- Phyllonemus filinemus Worthington & Ricardo, 1937
- Phyllonemus typus Boulenger, 1906 (Spatula-barbeled catfish)
