= Gephyroglanis gymnorhynchus =

Conservation status
- Data Deficient (IUCN 3.1)

Scientific classification
- Kingdom: Animalia
- Phylum: Chordata
- Class: Actinopterygii
- Order: Siluriformes
- Family: Claroteidae
- Genus: Gephyroglanis
- Species: G. gymnorhynchus

Binomial name
- Gephyroglanis gymnorhynchus Pappenheim in Pappenheim & Boulenger, 1914

Species of fish

Gephyroglanis gymnorhynchus is a species of claroteid catfish endemic to the Democratic Republic of the Congo where it is found in the Aruwimi River. This species grows to a length of 14.6 cm (5.7 in) SL.
