= Victoria stonebasher =

Conservation status
- Least Concern (IUCN 3.1)

Scientific classification
- Kingdom: Animalia
- Phylum: Chordata
- Class: Actinopterygii
- Order: Osteoglossiformes
- Family: Mormyridae
- Genus: Marcusenius
- Species: M. victoriae

Binomial name
- Marcusenius victoriae (Worthington, 1929)

Species of ray-finned fish

The Victoria stonebasher (Marcusenius victoriae) is a species of ray-finned fish in the family Mormyridae. It is found in Kenya, Rwanda, Tanzania, and Uganda. Its natural habitats are rivers, swamps, freshwater lakes, freshwater marshes, and inland deltas. It is threatened by habitat loss.

== Etymology ==
The fish is named after Lake Victoria, where it is found.
