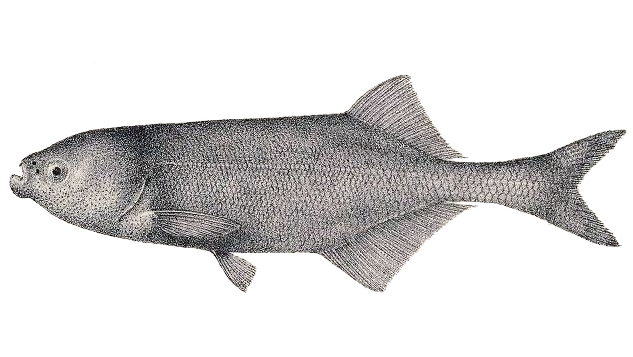

Conservation status
- Least Concern (IUCN 3.1)

Scientific classification
- Kingdom: Animalia
- Phylum: Chordata
- Class: Actinopterygii
- Order: Osteoglossiformes
- Family: Mormyridae
- Genus: Marcusenius
- Species: M. macrolepidotus

Binomial name
- Marcusenius macrolepidotus (Peters, 1852)

= Marcusenius macrolepidotus =

Species of fish

Marcusenius macrolepidotus, commonly known as the bulldog, is a bony-tongued freshwater elephantfish from the genus Marcusenius and the family Mormyridae. They are typically found in rivers and lakes in South-Eastern Africa. The species was named after its distinctive feature of a mental lobe on its lower jaw that protrudes beyond the upper jaw, a characteristic similar to that of the bulldog dog breed. The Mormyridae family contains weakly electric fish, all of which have an electric discharge organ located near the tail. This electric discharge organ can be used for object/prey detection, exhibiting aggressive behaviors, and intraspecies communication. M. marcusenius typically appear in groups of fish called shoals, and are most active at night. Overnight, they spend time feeding on insects, algae, and fish. The species was discovered in 1852 by German naturalist Wilhelm Peters, who originally named the fish Morymus macrolepidotus. Since its discovery, the fish has been subject to multiple changes in scientific name, geographic distribution, and common names due to limited scientific research on the Marcusenius genus. However, after thorough comparison of allopatric populations of bulldogs in Africa, it has been determined that the original bulldogs are a separate four taxa based on genetics, morphology, and electric organ discharges.

== Species description ==
Bulldogs are uniquely identified by a mental lobe on their lower jaw that protrudes beyond the upper jaw. The mean standard length from the tip of the snout to the fork in the caudal is 8.3 cm, with the maximum length being 16.9 cm and the minimum being 5.1 cm. Mouths are terminal, on the same level as the eye. The body is compressed and fusiform. The dorsal fin is located further posterior than the typical standard distance, and has a number of 20 rays. The anal fin is located opposite and slightly more anterior than the dorsal fin, and has around 26 rays. The caudal fin is forked into two rounded lobes. The scales are cycloid and larger than other typical Morymidae. There are five conical-shaped teeth located on the premaxilla, and six conical-shaped teeth on the lower jaw.

The color of the bulldog varies from dark silver on the back to a fair color on the belly. Dark grey splotches are present on the entire body, with the exception of being on the head and belly. An overall gold-olive or purple shimmer can be observed on their whole body as well, but it depends on the lighting and varies from fish to fish. Sexual dimorphism is limited, with adult males having a kink at the base of the anal fin, which is a feature absent in juveniles and females.

Until recently, fish such as M. altisambesi in the Upper Zambezi River, M. pongolensis, and M. devosi were believed to be M. macrolepidotus, but have since been distinguished as distinct species due to more extensive DNA analysis and differentiation of physical attributes. Bulldogs can be distinguished in comparison to M. altisambesi by their number of scales on their caudal peduncle, with bulldogs having a median of 16 scales while M. altembesi have a median of 12 scales. Compared to M. devosi, they have a smaller number of scales in linear series along the lateral line row (SLS), with a median of 55.5 for M. macrolepidotus versus a median of 62.5 for M. devosi, and there is also a shorter caudal peduncle length (18.8% of standard body length vs. 20.2%). When compared to M. pongolensis, they have a smaller SLS (55.5 vs. 73), a smaller median of caudal peduncle scales (16 vs. 18.5), and a greater body depth (26.5% vs. 24.7% of standard body length).

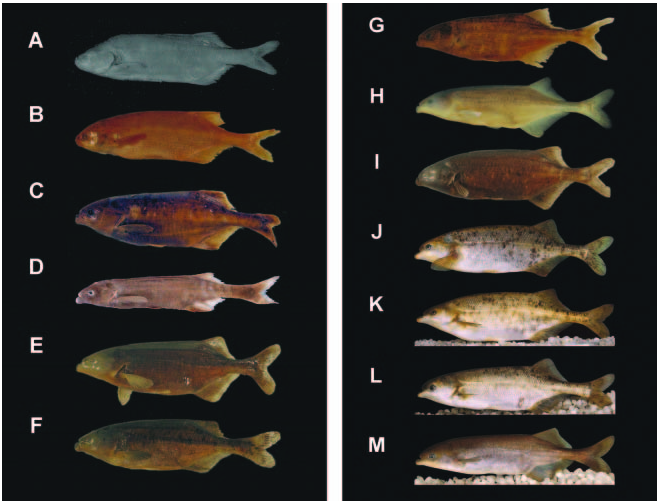
All species and forms of the Marcusenius macrolepidotus species complex, A, E, F, I and L show what is currently considered Marcusenius macrolepidotus.

Most fish in the Mormyridae family have an electric organ located in the caudal peduncle. This electric organ is known to emit electric-organ discharges (EODs) in short bursts, usually around 1 ms. EOD waveforms are species-specific, which means that the waveforms essentially create a radio channel between individuals of the same species for the main purpose of communication. It is known that as the body size of male individuals increases, so does the duration of the EOD pulse. A signal of a just turned sexually mature male can reach up to 83 cm in distance despite being just recently sexually mature (standard body length of 12.6 cm). This signal also gets up to 150 cm in large males (standard body length of 27.5 cm).

== Systematics and taxonomy ==
The scientific name for bulldogs is Marcusenius macrolepidotus. Marcusenius was coined after Latvian ichthyologist Dr Johann Andreas Marcusen. Macrolepidotus is a Latin-based name, meaning "large-scaled": Macro (long or large) and lepidotus (scaley).

== Distribution ==
Bulldogs are a species that mainly inhabit Southeastern Africa. They are migratory fish, which prefer to inhabit muddy-bottomed and heavily vegetated inland freshwater ecosystems, primarily rivers, lakes, and floodplains. Up until recently, the Bulldog was believed to be a single widespread species, with the idea that they were within many other countries, such as the Democratic Republic of Congo, Botswana, South Africa, and more. However, after recent gene analysis of multiple supposed Bulldog populations, it was found that M. macrolepidotus mainly inhabits the Middle to Lower Zambezi River from the Victoria Falls area in Zimbabwe and Zambia, through to Tete, Mozambique, a much smaller range than originally believed. They have also been found in the Licuare River, and have been recorded to migrate in shoals up Zambezi River tributaries such as the Shire River, which receives drainage from Lake Malawi, and the Buzi and Muele Rivers in Mozambique, especially during flood season. There have been no recordings of introductions to non-native habitats, and populations are relatively stable in their distribution throughout these places.

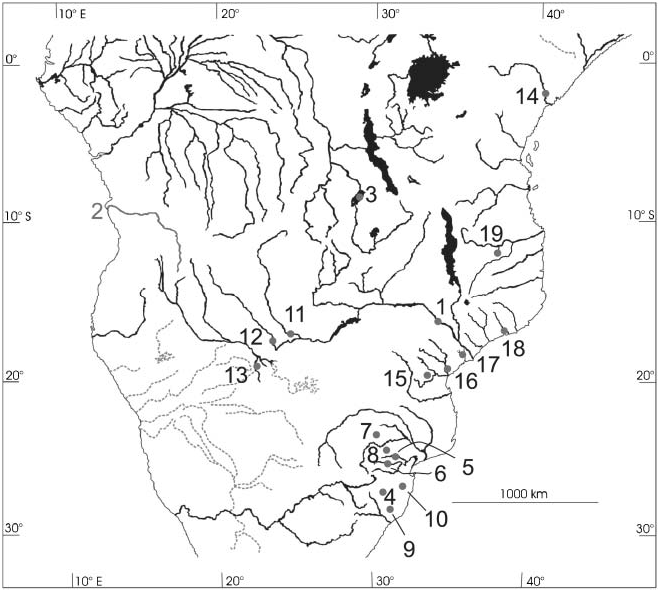
Partial map of southern Africa showing the sampling localities for Marcusenius sp. (1) Tete on the Lower Zambezi, (15) Buzi River System; (16) Pungwe River; (17) Lower Zambezi, delta region; (18) Mulela River; (19) Rovuma River System, all sampling locations where bulldogs were found.

== Life history ==
Bulldogs are electroreceptive and can use the distortions in their own electric fields to detect nearby objects as well as other electric fish species. They typically have higher activity at night, meaning that this electroreceptive feature allows for activity during times and within areas that are typically low-visibility. A study was conducted to observe the possibility of intrasexual competition between males based on variable EOD pulse lengths. It was found that there is a positive correlation between body size and EOD pulse length. When a playback of a longer pulse was initiated, there was a higher attack rate from male fish. This is due to the longer pulse representing a territorial threat of a larger, fit male, invoking an increased aggressive response. It was discovered that the African Sharptooth Catfish, Clarias gariepinus, can detect the EODs of bulldogs through electroreception, and due to the longer emission duration in adult males, their main prey consists of adult male bulldogs in their geographic area.

Limited information is known about the reproductive strategies of bulldogs; however, it is known that spawning occurs after upstream migration to flooded sites during rainy seasons, and that the highest fecundity occurs after a dry season but immediately before a rainy season. Neither females nor males exhibit any parental care for their offspring, and females will scatter eggs by rapid tail flips while they actively leave the spawning site. In one study that performed captive breeding, spawning began 20 minutes after the introduction of a male and female individual, with around 300–500 eggs being released. Hatching of eggs occurred 3–4 days after spawning. As the standard length of M. macrolepidotus larvae increased, EOD amplitude increased as well, gradually changing into an adult EOD waveform. Once individuals had an adult EOD waveform, they were around 30 mm and 60 days old.

Bulldog diets are based on water depth. As the water level increases, their feeding strategy is that of a generalist predator, feeding on mainly insects, fish, and some seeds. At low water levels, their feeding strategy shifts to a specialized grazing, feeding on almost exclusively algae, and sometimes fish. When floods occur that cause high water levels, bulldogs will take advantage of the large amount of available resources. However, when the floodplains dry out, they will back-migrate to lower water levels to feed on algae and use the "concentration" effect to feed on fish as well.

== Conservation status ==
According to the IUCN Red List of Threatened Species, M. macrolepidotus is of the Least Concern status. Due to the limited amount of studies done on this fish, little is known about its population dynamics, leading to restricted information on how threatened they truly may be. Like most freshwater fish, river and lake pollution is a large threat to fish health, with common effects including immunosuppression, damage to gills, and reduced metabolism, along with some instances of disease. It is likely that these threats do affect bulldogs, but further research into how said pollution specifically affects bulldogs is needed to confirm these findings. There are currently no conservation efforts for M. macrolepidotus, and no known invasive species threats to this particular species.
