= Bathyclarias nyasensis =

Conservation status
- Least Concern (IUCN 3.1)

Scientific classification
- Kingdom: Animalia
- Phylum: Chordata
- Class: Actinopterygii
- Order: Siluriformes
- Family: Clariidae
- Genus: Bathyclarias
- Species: B. nyasensis

Binomial name
- Bathyclarias nyasensis (Worthington, 1933)

Synonyms
- Bathyclarias ilesi Jackson, 1959; Bathyclarias jacksoni (Greenwood, 1961); Bathyclarias loweae Jackson, 1959

Species of fish

Bathyclarias nyasensis is a species of airbreathing catfish endemic to Lake Malawi, in the countries of Malawi, Mozambique and Tanzania. This species grows to a length of 100 cm (39.4 in) SL. This species is commercially caught for human consumption.
