= Kukumai =

Conservation status
- Least Concern (IUCN 3.1)

Scientific classification
- Kingdom: Animalia
- Phylum: Chordata
- Class: Actinopterygii
- Order: Siluriformes
- Family: Claroteidae
- Genus: Chrysichthys
- Species: C. grandis

Binomial name
- Chrysichthys grandis Boulenger, 1917

Synonyms
- Bathybagrus grandis (Boulenger, 1917)

Species of fish

The kukumai (Chrysichthys grandis) is a species of claroteid catfish endemic to Lake Tanganyika along the border of Burundi, the Democratic Republic of the Congo, Tanzania, and Zambia. It reaches a length of 63 cm (25 in) TL and is a minor component of local commercial fisheries.
