= Chrysichthys graueri =

Conservation status
- Least Concern (IUCN 3.1)

Scientific classification
- Kingdom: Animalia
- Phylum: Chordata
- Class: Actinopterygii
- Division: Teleostei
- Order: Siluriformes
- Family: Claroteidae
- Genus: Chrysichthys
- Species: C. graueri

Binomial name
- Chrysichthys graueri Steindachner, 1911

Synonyms
- Bathybagrus graueri (Steindachner, 1911)

Species of fish

Chrysichthys graueri is a species of claroteid catfish endemic to Lake Tanganyika on the border of Burundi, the Democratic Republic of the Congo, Tanzania, and Zambia. It grows to a length of 36.0 cm (14 in) TL and is a component of local commercial fisheries.
