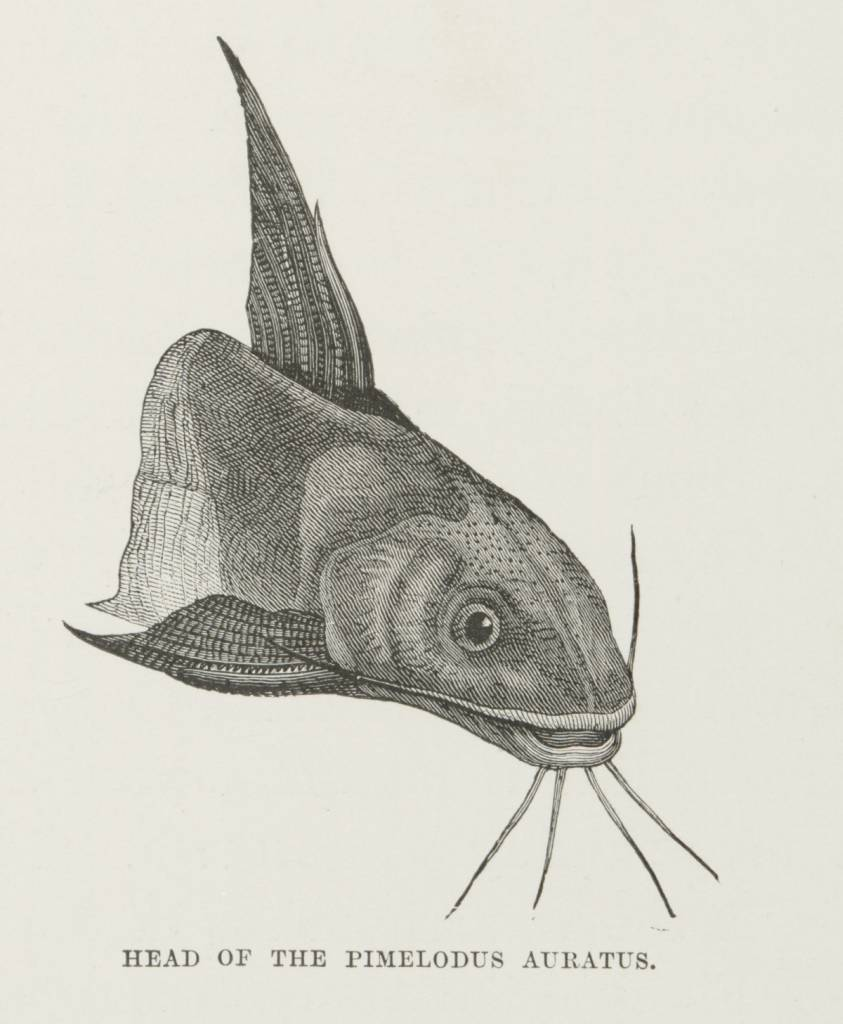

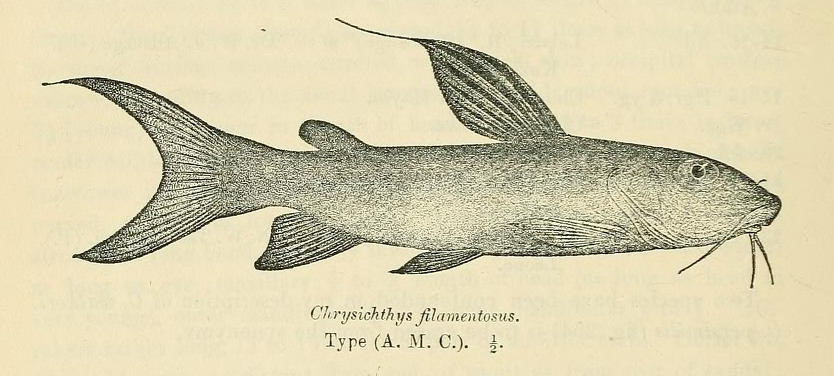
- Chrysichthys auratus

Scientific classification
- Kingdom: Animalia
- Phylum: Chordata
- Class: Actinopterygii
- Division: Teleostei
- Order: Siluriformes
- Family: Claroteidae
- Genus: Chrysichthys
- Species: C. auratus

Binomial name
- Chrysichthys auratus (É. Geoffroy Saint-Hilaire, 1809)

Synonyms
- Pimelodus auratus Geoffroy Saint-Hilaire, 1809; Bagrus auratus (Geoffroy Saint-Hilaire, 1809); Chrysichthys auratus auratus (Geoffroy Saint-Hilaire, 1809); Porcus auratus (Geoffroy Saint-Hilaire, 1809); Chysichthys auratus (Geoffroy Saint-Hilaire, 1809); Bagrus capito Valenciennes, 1840; Chrysichthys macrops Günther, 1864; Chrysichthys kingsleyae Günther, 1899; Chrysichthys persimilis Günther, 1899; Amarginops persimilis (Günther, 1899); Gephyroglanis tilhoi Pellegrin, 1909; Chrysichthys auratus tilhoi (Pellegrin, 1909); Chrysichthys filamentosus Boulenger, 1912; Chrysichthys longifilis Pfaff, 1933; Chrysichthys auratus longifilis Pfaff, 1933; Chrysichthys longifelis Pfaff, 1933

= Chrysichthys auratus =

Species of fish

The golden Nile catfish (Chrysichthys auratus) is a species of fish belonging to the family Claroteidae.

The species is found in Africa.

The fish is widespread and is known from most of the West African hydrographic basins, except in the coastal areas between Gambia and Liberia, where it is replaced by Chrysichthys maurus. It is also present from southern Liberia to Cabinda in Angola, and widespread throughout Lower Guinea. It is also reported from the Chad and Nile.

== Size ==
The fish can get as large as 84 cm (33 in)
