= Haplochromis bartoni =

Conservation status
- Data Deficient (IUCN 3.1)

Scientific classification
- Kingdom: Animalia
- Phylum: Chordata
- Class: Actinopterygii
- Order: Cichliformes
- Family: Cichlidae
- Genus: Haplochromis
- Species: H. bartoni

Binomial name
- Haplochromis bartoni Greenwood, 1962

Synonyms
- Prognathochromis bartoni (Greenwood, 1962)

Species of fish

Haplochromis bartoni was a species of cichlid endemic to Lake Victoria. This species can reach a length of 19.5 centimetres (7.7 in) SL. It has not been recorded in recent surveys but as the whole of Lake Victoria has not been surveyed for this species the IUCN classify it as Data Deficient. This species was said by Greenwood to bear some resemblance to Haplochromis worthingtoni so he named this species after E. Barton Worthington (1905-2001) as well.
