= Eaglesomia =

Eaglesomia Temporal range: ?Lutetian

Scientific classification
- Kingdom: Animalia
- Phylum: Chordata
- Class: Actinopterygii
- Division: Teleostei
- Order: Siluriformes
- Family: Claroteidae
- Genus: †Eaglesomia; White, 1934
- Species: †E. eaglesomei

Binomial name
- †Eaglesomia eaglesomei (White, 1926)

Synonyms
- Chrysichthys eaglesomei White, 1926

Extinct species of fish

Eaglesomia is an extinct genus of freshwater catfish, most likely of the family Claroteidae, that inhabited western Africa during the Eocene. It contains a single species, E. eaglesomei, known from the presumably Lutetian-aged marine Oshosun and Ameki Formations of Nigeria.

Initially placed in the modern genus Chrysichthys, a 1934 reanalysis found it to be more similar to the Egyptian fossil catfish Socnopaea, and it was thus reclassified into its own genus within the Claroteidae. However, a 2010 study found it to lack several characteristics of the Claroteidae, and thus not be a claroteid. In contrast, a 2021 study retained it in the Claroteidae based on its distinctive skull ornamentation, which more closely resembled that of claroteids than any other catfish family.
