= Marcusenius abadii =

Conservation status
- Least Concern (IUCN 3.1)

Scientific classification
- Kingdom: Animalia
- Phylum: Chordata
- Class: Actinopterygii
- Order: Osteoglossiformes
- Family: Mormyridae
- Genus: Marcusenius
- Species: M. abadii

Binomial name
- Marcusenius abadii Boulenger, 1901

Species of fish

Marcusenius abadii is a species of electric fish of the family Mormyridae found in the Niger, Benue and Volta rivers. It is native to Burkina Faso, Ghana, Niger and Togo; it can reach a size of approximately 400 mm (16 in).

Regarding its conservation status, according to the IUCN, this species can be classified as "Least concern (LC)".
