= Pardiglanis tarabinii =

Conservation status
- Data Deficient (IUCN 3.1)

Scientific classification
- Kingdom: Animalia
- Phylum: Chordata
- Class: Actinopterygii
- Order: Siluriformes
- Family: Claroteidae
- Subfamily: Claroteinae
- Genus: Pardiglanis; Poll, Lanza & Romoli Sassi, 1972
- Species: P. tarabinii

Binomial name
- Pardiglanis tarabinii Poll, Lanza & Romoli Sassi, 1972

Synonyms
- Clarotes tarabinii (Poll, Lanza & Romoli Sassi, 1972)

Species of fish

Pardiglanis tarabinii, the Somalian giant catfish, is a species of claroteid catfish native to Kenya and Somalia.

This species has uncertain taxonomic status. It has been placed by itself in the genus Pardiglanis. However, some sources have considered this genus to be a junior synonym of Clarotes.

It lives in mud at bottom of rivers. It occurs in the Juba River, probably in the Shebelle River in Somalia and the Lower Tana River, and possibly in the Northern Ewaso Ng'iro in Kenya. Its natural habitat is rivers.

It can reach a length of 75 cm (29.5 inches) SL, but is not of any importance in local fisheries.
