= Bathyclarias worthingtoni =

Conservation status
- Least Concern (IUCN 3.1)

Scientific classification
- Kingdom: Animalia
- Phylum: Chordata
- Class: Actinopterygii
- Order: Siluriformes
- Family: Clariidae
- Genus: Bathyclarias
- Species: B. worthingtoni

Binomial name
- Bathyclarias worthingtoni P. B. N. Jackson, 1959

Synonyms
- Bathyclarias gigas Jackson, 1959; Dinotopterus gigas Jackson, 1959; Dinotopterus worthingtoni Jackson, 1959

Species of fish

Bathyclarias worthingtoni is a species of airbreathing catfish endemic to Lake Malawi, in the countries of Malawi, Mozambique and Tanzania. This species grows to a length of 80 cm (31.5 in) SL. This species is commercially caught for human consumption.
