= Marcusenius cuangoanus =

Conservation status
- Vulnerable (IUCN 3.1)

Scientific classification
- Kingdom: Animalia
- Phylum: Chordata
- Class: Actinopterygii
- Order: Osteoglossiformes
- Family: Mormyridae
- Genus: Marcusenius
- Species: M. cuangoanus

Binomial name
- Marcusenius cuangoanus Poll, 1967

Species of fish

Marcusenius cuangoanus is a species of electric fish in the family Mormyridae that is native to Angola; its range is limited to a specific area of the Kwango River, belonging to the Congo River; it can reach a size of approximately 114 mm (4.5 in).

Regarding its conservation status, according to the IUCN, this species can be classified in the "Vulnerable (VU)" category, mainly due to the accumulation of sediments from mining operations in the Kwango River.
