= Gephyroglanis =

Scientific classification
- Domain: Eukaryota
- Kingdom: Animalia
- Phylum: Chordata
- Class: Actinopterygii
- Order: Siluriformes
- Family: Claroteidae
- Subfamily: Claroteinae
- Genus: Gephyroglanis; Boulenger, 1899

Type species
- Gephyroglanis congicus Boulenger, 1899

Genus of fishes

Gephyroglanis is a genus of claroteid catfishes native to Africa.

== Species ==
There are currently three recognized species in this genus:

- Gephyroglanis congicus Boulenger, 1899
- Gephyroglanis gymnorhynchus Pappenheim, 1914
- Gephyroglanis habereri Steindachner, 1912
