= Bathybagrus tetranema =

Conservation status
- Near Threatened (IUCN 3.1)

Scientific classification
- Kingdom: Animalia
- Phylum: Chordata
- Class: Actinopterygii
- Division: Teleostei
- Order: Siluriformes
- Family: Claroteidae
- Genus: Bathybagrus; R. M. Bailey & D. J. Stewart, 1984
- Species: B. tetranema

Binomial name
- Bathybagrus tetranema Bailey & Stewart, 1984

Species of fish

Bathybagrus tetranema is a species of claroteid catfish endemic to Lake Tanganyika where it is found in the waters within the borders of Zambia, DR Congo and Burundi. It grows to a length of 17.0 cm (6.7 in) SL. It is the only species within Bathybagrus.
