= Bathyclarias filicibarbis =

Conservation status
- Least Concern (IUCN 3.1)

Scientific classification
- Kingdom: Animalia
- Phylum: Chordata
- Class: Actinopterygii
- Order: Siluriformes
- Family: Clariidae
- Genus: Bathyclarias
- Species: B. filicibarbis

Binomial name
- Bathyclarias filicibarbis P. B. N. Jackson, 1959

Species of fish

Bathyclarias filicibarbis is a species of airbreathing catfish endemic to Lake Malawi, in the countries of Malawi, Mozambique and Tanzania. This species grows to a length of 79.2 cm (31.2 in) TL. This species can be found in the aquarium trade.
