= Marcusenius livingstonii =

Conservation status
- Least Concern (IUCN 3.1)

Scientific classification
- Kingdom: Animalia
- Phylum: Chordata
- Class: Actinopterygii
- Order: Osteoglossiformes
- Family: Mormyridae
- Genus: Marcusenius
- Species: M. livingstonii

Binomial name
- Marcusenius livingstonii (Boulenger,1898)

Species of ray-finned fish

Livingston's bulldog (Marcusenius livingstonii) is a species of ray-finned fish in the family Mormyridae. It is found in Malawi, Mozambique, and Tanzania. Its natural habitats are rivers, intermittent rivers, and freshwater lakes. It is threatened by habitat loss.

== Etymology ==
The fish is named in honor of the brother of explorer David Livingstone, Charles Livingstone (1821-1873), who collected the type specimen.
