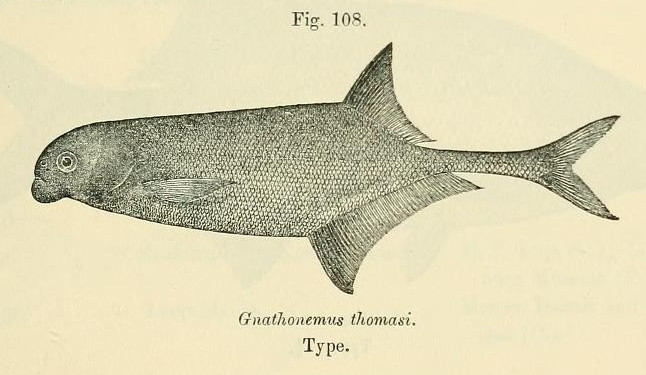

Conservation status
- Least Concern (IUCN 3.1)

Scientific classification
- Kingdom: Animalia
- Phylum: Chordata
- Class: Actinopterygii
- Order: Osteoglossiformes
- Family: Mormyridae
- Genus: Marcusenius
- Species: M. thomasi

Binomial name
- Marcusenius thomasi (Boulenger,1916)

Synonyms
- Gnathonemus thomasi Boulenger, 1916

= Marcusenius thomasi =

Species of ray-finned fish

Sherbo mormyrid (Marcusenius thomasi) is a species of ray-finned fish in the family Mormyridae. It is found in Guinea, Guinea-Bissau, Liberia, and Sierre Leone. Its natural habitats are rivers, intermittent rivers, and freshwater lakes. It is threatened by Mining and deforestation.

== Etymology ==
The fish is named in honor of anthropologist Northcote W. Thomas (1868-1936), who collected the type specimen.
