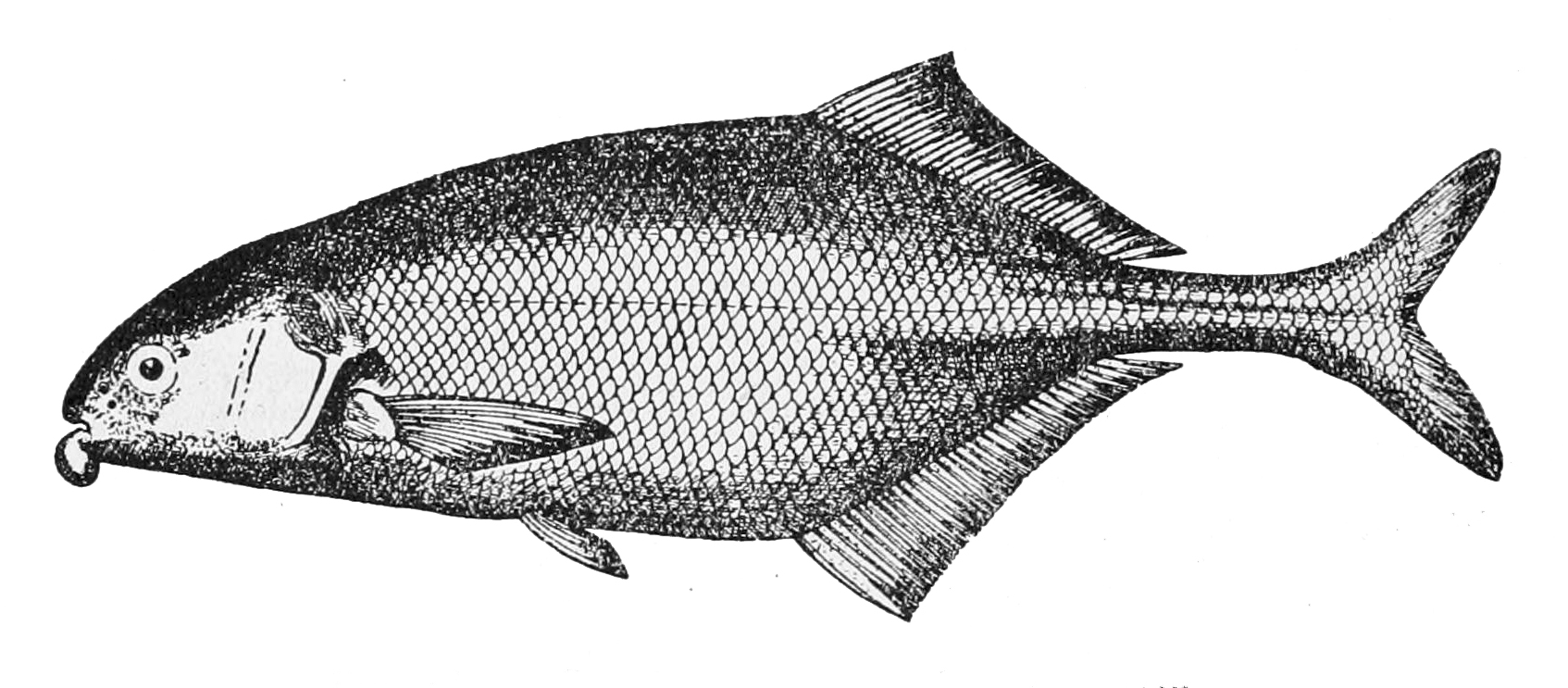

Conservation status
- Least Concern (IUCN 3.1)

Scientific classification
- Kingdom: Animalia
- Phylum: Chordata
- Class: Actinopterygii
- Order: Osteoglossiformes
- Family: Mormyridae
- Genus: Marcusenius
- Species: M. furcidens

Binomial name
- Marcusenius furcidens (Pellegrin, 1920)

Synonyms
- Gnathonemus furcidens Pellegrin, 1920

= Marcusenius furcidens =

Species of fish

Ivory Coast mormyrid (Marcusenius furcidens) is a species of electric fish in the family Mormyridae, found in the Como, Bandama, Sassandra, Bia and Tano rivers. It is native to the Ivory Coast and Ghana; it can reach a size of approximately 286 mm (11.3 in).

Regarding its conservation status, according to the IUCN, this species was previously classified as "Near Threatened (NT)", but this was reduced to "Least Concern (LC)" in 2020.
