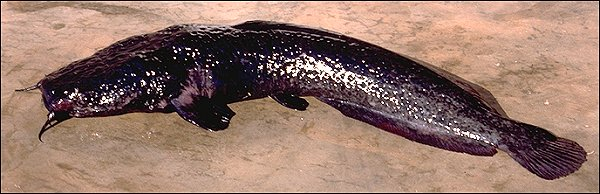

Conservation status
- Least Concern (IUCN 3.1)

Scientific classification
- Kingdom: Animalia
- Phylum: Chordata
- Class: Actinopterygii
- Order: Siluriformes
- Family: Clariidae
- Genus: Bathyclarias
- Species: B. foveolatus

Binomial name
- Bathyclarias foveolatus (P. B. N. Jackson, 1955)

= Bathyclarias foveolatus =

Species of fish

Bathyclarias foveolatus is a species of airbreathing catfish endemic to Lake Malawi, in the countries of Malawi, Mozambique and Tanzania. This species grows to a length of 75 cm (29.5 in) SL.
