= Chrysichthys depressus =

Scientific classification
- Kingdom: Animalia
- Phylum: Chordata
- Class: Actinopterygii
- Order: Siluriformes
- Family: Claroteidae
- Genus: Chrysichthys
- Species: C. depressus

Binomial name
- Chrysichthys depressus (Nichols & Griscom, 1917)

Synonyms
- Gnathobagrus depressus Nichols & Griscom, 1917; Amarginops depressus (Nichols & Griscom, 1917)

Species of fish

Chrysichthys depressus is a species of catfish endemic to the Democratic Republic of the Congo where it is only found near Boma. It was formerly known as Gnathobagrus depressus.

== Distribution ==
The fish is found in Africa and is only known from the type locality at Boma (lower Congo River basin), in the Democratic Republic of the Congo

== Size ==
This species reaches a length of 19.5 cm (7.7 in).
