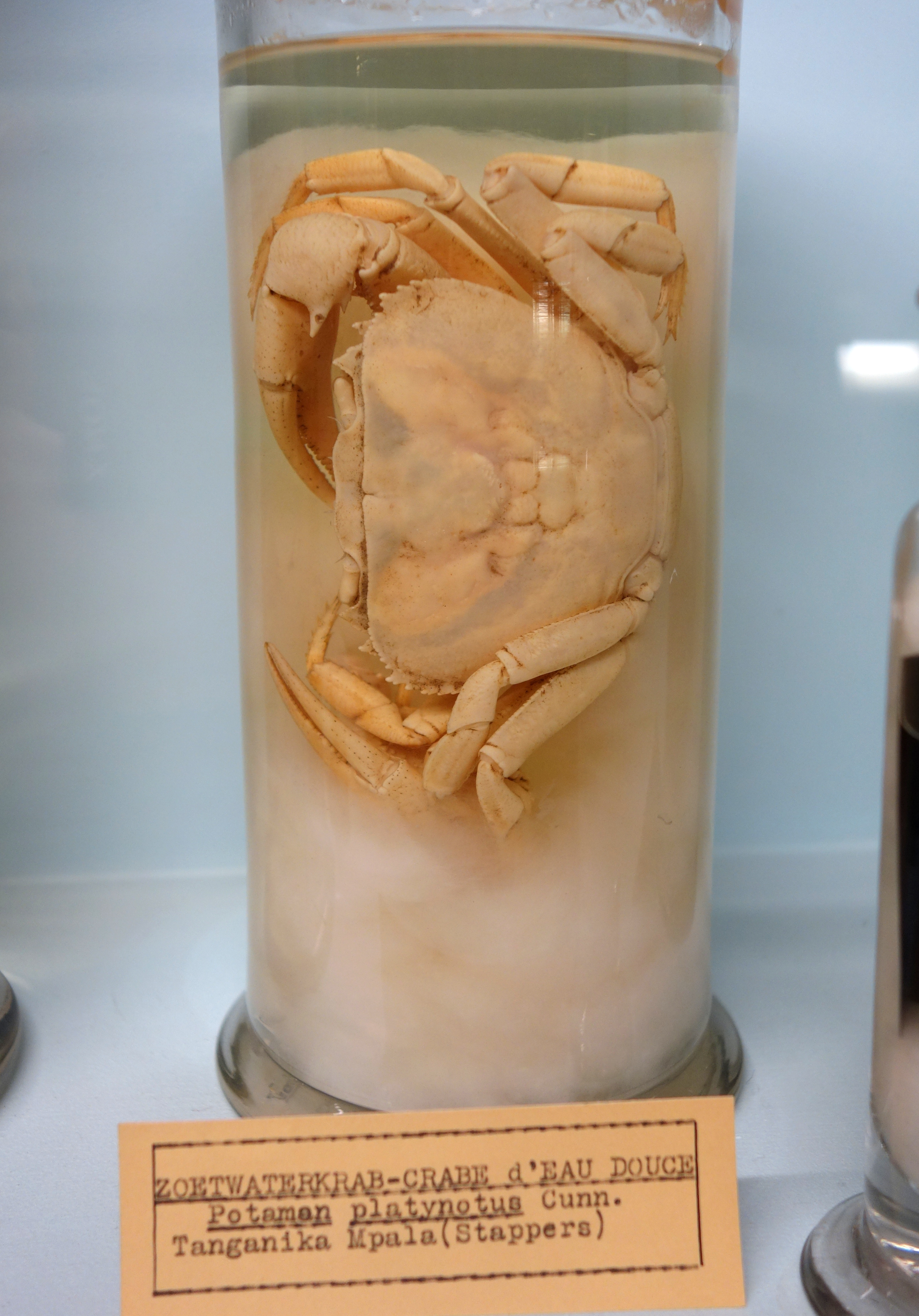

Conservation status
- Least Concern (IUCN 3.1)

Scientific classification
- Kingdom: Animalia
- Phylum: Arthropoda
- Class: Malacostraca
- Order: Decapoda
- Suborder: Pleocyemata
- Infraorder: Brachyura
- Family: Potamonautidae
- Genus: Arcopotamonautes
- Species: A. platynotus

Binomial name
- Arcopotamonautes platynotus Cunnington, 1907

= Arcopotamonautes platynotus =

Species of crab

Arcopotamonautes platynotus is a species of freshwater crab which is endemic to Lake Tanganyika, where it is the only freshwater crab outside the genus Platythelphusa. Although primarily aquatic, A. platynotus is sometimes seen out of water, and can survive for many hours without water.
