= Nigerium =

Nigerium Temporal range: Late Paleocene to Early Eocene

Scientific classification
- Kingdom: Animalia
- Phylum: Chordata
- Class: Actinopterygii
- Division: Teleostei
- Order: Siluriformes
- Family: Claroteidae
- Genus: †Nigerium; White, 1934

Species
- †N. wurnoense White, 1934; †N. tamaguelense Longbottom, 2010

Extinct species of fish

Nigerium is an extinct genus of catfish known from the early Paleogene of northern Africa. It is the earliest known member of the family Claroteidae, which is still widespread in freshwater habitats of tropical Africa. Its presence also supports the Claroteidae being the earliest occurring catfishes in Africa.

It contains two known species:

- †N. wurnoense White, 1934 (type species) - Late Paleocene of Sokoto, Nigeria (Dange Formation)
- †N. tamaguelense Longbottom, 2010 - Early Eocene of Mali (Tamaguélelt Formation of the Trans-Saharan Seaway)

In addition, a former third species "N." gadense White, 1934 is known from the same Late Paleocene deposits as N. wurnoense. However, White only tentatively assigned this species to Nigerium, and an analysis by Murray & Holmes (2021) supported it belonging to a different genus than the other two species.

Remains of Nigerium are found only in marine deposits, despite this family only occurring in freshwater in the modern day. Although White (1934) suggested that these remains may have been washed out to sea from freshwater environments, more recent studies suggest that many modern freshwater catfish families may have had extinct marine representatives, suggesting that Nigerium may have been at least partly marine.
