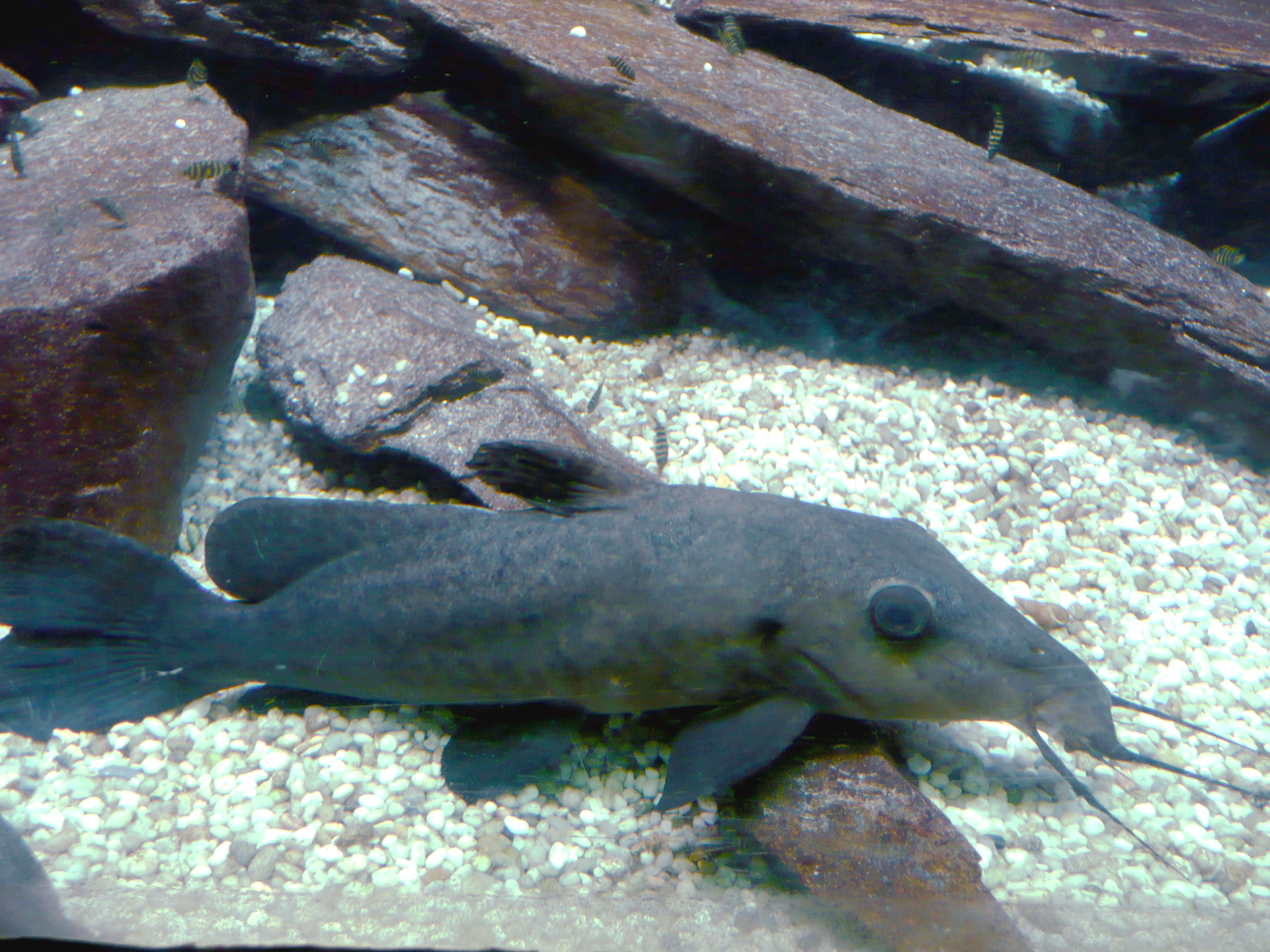

Conservation status
- Least Concern (IUCN 3.1)

Scientific classification
- Kingdom: Animalia
- Phylum: Chordata
- Class: Actinopterygii
- Order: Siluriformes
- Family: Auchenoglanididae
- Genus: Auchenoglanis
- Species: A. occidentalis

Binomial name
- Auchenoglanis occidentalis (Valenciennes, 1840)

Synonyms
- Auchenoglanis scutatus, Schmitz, 1912; Auchenoglanis vittatus, Mokelo, 1978; Pimelodus occidentalis, Valenciennes, 1840; Auchenaspis occidentalis, (Valenciennes, 1840); Auchenoglanis biscutatus occidentalis, (Valenciennes, 1840); Auchenoglanis occidentalis occidentalis, (Valenciennes, 1840); Auchenoglannis occidentalis, (Valenciennes, 1840); Oxyglanis sacchii, Vinciguerra, 1898; Auchenoglanis occidentalis tanganicanus, Boulenger, 1906; Auchenoglanis occidentalis tchadiensis, Pellegrin, 1909; Auchenoglanis occidentalis tchadensis, Pellegrin, 1909; Auchenoglanis tchadensis, Pellegrin, 1909; Auchenoglanis acuticeps, Pappenheim, 1914; Auchenoglanis wittei, Giltay, 1930; Auchenoglanis occidentalis tanganyikanus, Jayaram, 1966

= Giraffe catfish =

Species of fish

The giraffe catfish (Auchenoglanis occidentalis), or bubu, is a species of catfish found in Africa. It eats plants off the floor of lakes and streams. The diet of giraffe catfish is very dependent upon their environment. They keep an omnivorous diet but mainly eat insects present in the waters.

== Distribution and habitat ==
The giraffe catfish is found throughout Africa in lakes and rivers, partially due to introduction and establishment in other areas. It is found in many important lakes and rivers such as the Nile and Lake Chad. Its distribution includes bodies of water from East Africa to West Africa. It generally lives in shallow waters with muddy bottoms.

== Anatomy and appearance ==
This fish has a maximum size that sources say is between 2 and 3 feet.

The giraffe-like pattern will fade with age to a two-tone mottled brown. Various subspecies have been described for this fish, indicating some geographical color variation.

== Reproduction ==
Eggs are scattered in a nest and guarded by the male. Dinotopterus cunningtoni takes advantage of the care and allows the male giraffe catfish to care for its eggs and young, an example of interspecific brood care.

== Relationship to humans ==
The giraffe catfish is occasionally imported for the aquarium trade. Because of its large eventual size and its fast rate of growth, it is inappropriate for smaller aquaria. This fish will readily accept a variety of foods and is tolerant of a wide variety of water conditions. They will scavenge the aquarium looking for food, which could cause the uprooting of plants.

This fish is also an important food fish in Africa.
