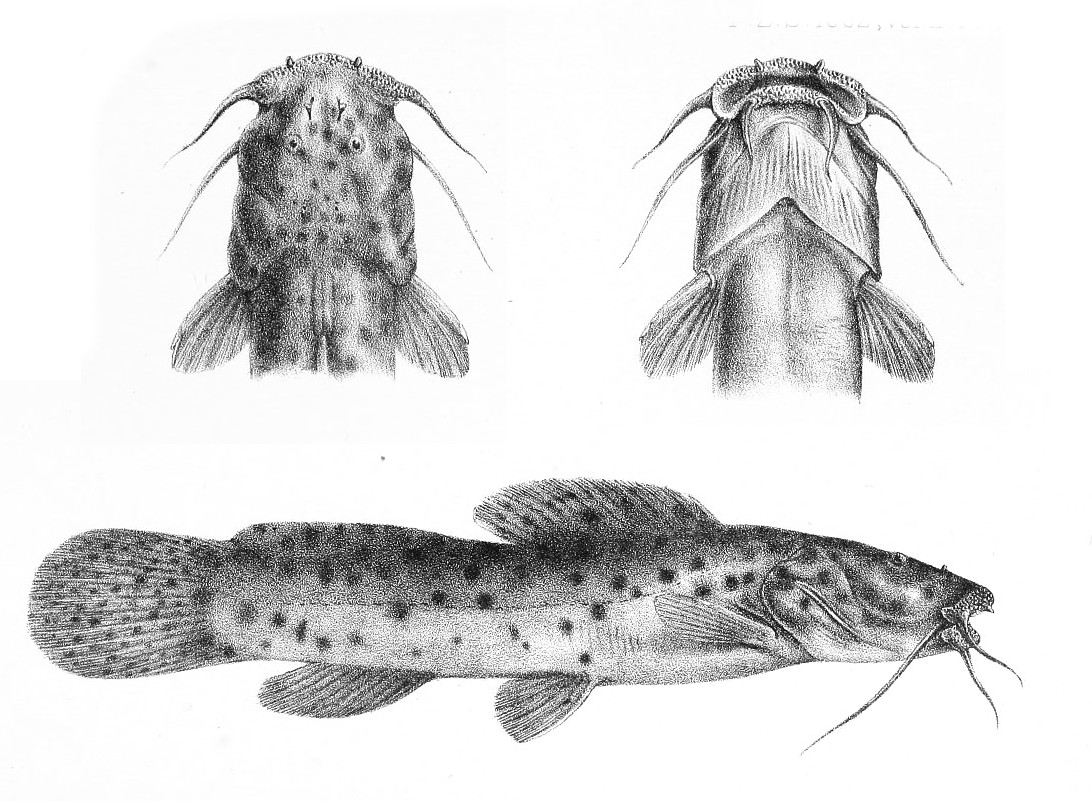
- N. walkeri

Scientific classification
- Kingdom: Animalia
- Phylum: Chordata
- Class: Actinopterygii
- Order: Siluriformes
- Family: Auchenoglanididae
- Genus: Notoglanidium; Günther, 1903

Type species
- Notoglanidium walkeri Günther, 1903

= Notoglanidium =

Genus of fishes

Notoglanidium is a genus of claroteid catfishes native to Africa. The formerly recognized genera Anaspidoglanis, Liauchenoglanis and Platyglanis have all been merged into Notoglanidium.

== Species ==
There are currently nine recognized species in this genus:

- Notoglanidium akiri (Risch, 1987)
- Notoglanidium boutchangai (Thys van den Audenaerde, 1965)
- Notoglanidium depierrei (Daget, 1979)
- Notoglanidium maculatum (Boulenger, 1916)
- Notoglanidium macrostoma (Pellegrin, 1909) (Flatnose catfish)
- Notoglanidium pallidum T. R. Roberts & D. J. Stewart, 1976
- Notoglanidium pembetadi Vreven, Ibala Zamba, Mamonekene & Geerinckx, 2013
- Notoglanidium thomasi Boulenger, 1916
- Notoglanidium walkeri Günther, 1903
