= Amarginops =

Scientific classification
- Kingdom: Animalia
- Phylum: Chordata
- Class: Actinopterygii
- Order: Siluriformes
- Family: Claroteidae
- Subfamily: Claroteinae
- Genus: Amarginops; Nichols & Griscom, 1917

Type species
- Amarginops platus Nichols & Griscom, 1917

Genus of fishes

Amarginops is a genus of claroteid catfishes native to Africa where they are only found in Congo River system.

== Species ==
There are currently four recognized species in this genus:

- Amarginops hildae (Bell-Cross, 1973)
- Amarginops mabusi (Boulenger, 1905)
- Amarginops ornatus (Boulenger, 1902)
- Amarginops platus Nichols & Griscom, 1917

The genus was formerly monotypic, featuring only A. platus.
