= Bathyclarias eurydon =

Conservation status
- Least Concern (IUCN 3.1)

Scientific classification
- Kingdom: Animalia
- Phylum: Chordata
- Class: Actinopterygii
- Division: Teleostei
- Order: Siluriformes
- Family: Clariidae
- Genus: Bathyclarias
- Species: B. eurydon

Binomial name
- Bathyclarias eurydon P. B. N. Jackson, 1959

Species of fish

Bathyclarias eurydon is a species of airbreathing catfish endemic to Lake Malawi, in the countries of Malawi, Mozambique and Tanzania. This species grows to a length of 105 cm (41.3 in) TL.
