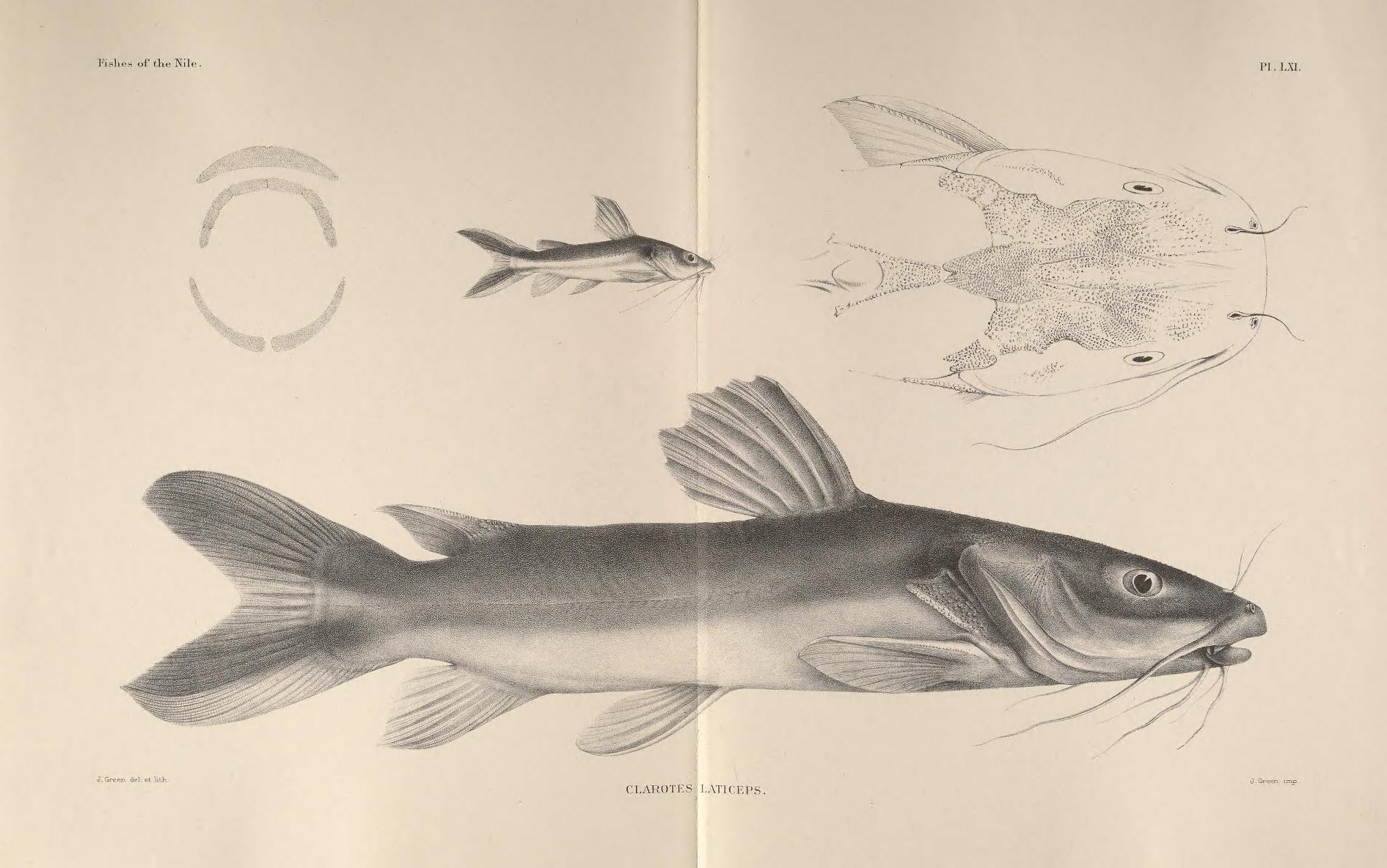
- Clarotes laticeps

Scientific classification
- Kingdom: Animalia
- Phylum: Chordata
- Class: Actinopterygii
- Order: Siluriformes
- Family: Claroteidae
- Subfamily: Claroteinae
- Genus: Clarotes; Kner, 1855

Type species
- Clarotes heuglini Kner, 1855

Synonyms
- Gonocephalus Kner, 185; Octonematichthys Bleeker, 1858

= Clarotes =

Genus of fishes

Clarotes is a genus of claroteid catfishes native to East Africa.

== Species ==
There are currently three extant species and one fossil species recognized in this genus:

- Clarotes bidorsalis Pellegrin, 1938
- †Clarotes eocenicus Murray & Holmes, 2021
- Clarotes laticeps (Rüppell, 1829) (Widehead catfish)
- Clarotes macrocephalus Daget, 1954

Synonyms

- Clarotes heuglini Kner, 1855; valid as Clarotes laticeps
- Clarotes tarabinii Poll, Lanza & Romoli Sassi, 1972; valid as Pardiglanis tarabinii (Somalian giant catfish)
