= Bathyclarias atribranchus =

Conservation status
- Least Concern (IUCN 3.1)

Scientific classification
- Kingdom: Animalia
- Phylum: Chordata
- Class: Actinopterygii
- Order: Siluriformes
- Family: Clariidae
- Genus: Bathyclarias
- Species: B. atribranchus

Binomial name
- Bathyclarias atribranchus (Greenwood, 1961)

Species of fish

Bathyclarias atribranchus is a species of airbreathing catfish endemic to Lake Malawi, in the countries of Malawi, Mozambique and Tanzania. This species grows to a length of 60 cm (23.6 in) TL.
