= Northcote W. Thomas =

Northcote Whitridge Thomas
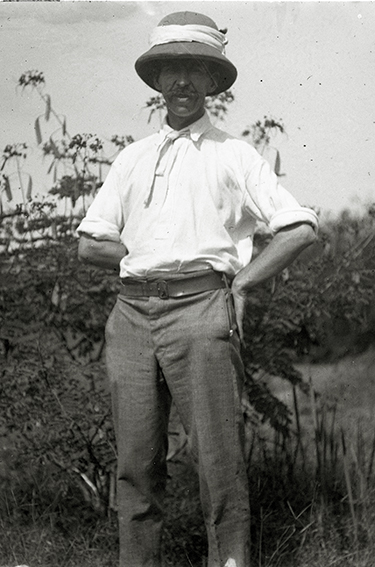
- Thomas c. 1910
- Born: 1868
- Died: 1936 (aged 67–68)
- Occupations: Anthropologist, psychical researcher

Northcote Whitridge Thomas (1868–1936) was a British anthropologist and psychical researcher.

== Career ==
Thomas was born in Oswestry, Shropshire. He studied history and graduated from Trinity College, Cambridge with a BA in 1890 and an MA in 1894. He published over fifty articles in academic journals and many books. He served on the councils of the Folklore Society and the Royal Anthropological Institute.

In 1909, Thomas became the first Government Anthropologist to be appointed by the British Colonial Office. In this capacity he conducted a series of anthropological surveys in Nigeria and Sierra Leone. He studied the Edo and Igbo people in Southern Nigeria, and worked mainly with Temne and Limba communities in Sierra Leone. In the course of his survey work, Thomas assembled large collections of artefacts, took thousands of photographs, made sound recordings of speech and music, and even collected botanical specimen. His artefact collection is now stored at the Museum of Archaeology and Anthropology, University of Cambridge.

In Nigeria, Thomas was described as an eccentric and undiplomatic individual. His superiors transferred him to Sierra Leone in 1913; after two years, he was sent home. He was once described by a Colonial Office clerk as "a recognized maniac in many ways. He wore sandals, even in this country, lived on vegetables and was generally a rum person." Despite criticism of his methods, the Colonial Office requested the Royal Anthropological Institute to examine Thomas's anthropological research of Nigeria. They declared that they were "impressed with the thoroughness of his enquiries."

It was alleged by historian Henrika Kuklick that Thomas had investigated the cannibalistic Human Leopard Society in Sierra Leone but in his report "refused to divulge the identities of the murderers he had interviewed, arguing that the anthropologist's code of professional ethics required him to maintain the confidentiality of the relationship he had with his informants." However, anthropologist Paul Basu who examined archival evidence has disputed this statement noting that Thomas never wrote a report on the Human Leopard Society.

== Psychical research ==
Thomas was a member of the Society for Psychical Research (SPR); he was also interested in the occult and collaborated on psychical research with his friend Andrew Lang. He authored works on crystal gazing and telepathy. His book on crystal gazing was criticized by anthropologist Edward Clodd as non-scientific.

== Archive ==
Thomas' archive and objects he collected are dispersed among a number of British institutions including the Museum of Archaeology and Anthropology, University of Cambridge, the British Library Sound Archive, the Pitt Rivers Museum, the Royal Anthropological Institute, the Royal Botanic Gardens, Kew and The National Archives.

Thomas's anthropological surveys in Southern Nigeria and Sierra Leone are the subject of a research project entitled [Re:]Entanglements funded by the UK's Arts & Humanities Research Council and led by anthropologist Paul Basu at SOAS. As well as archival- and collection-based research, the project involves retracing Thomas's itineraries in West Africa, as well as exploring contemporary uses, values and meanings attached to the historical material.

== Honoria ==
The fish Marcusenius thomasi (Boulenger 1916) is named after him, as he supplied the type specimen.
