= Chrysichthys stappersii =

Conservation status
- Least Concern (IUCN 3.1)

Scientific classification
- Kingdom: Animalia
- Phylum: Chordata
- Class: Actinopterygii
- Division: Teleostei
- Order: Siluriformes
- Family: Claroteidae
- Genus: Chrysichthys
- Species: C. stappersii

Binomial name
- Chrysichthys stappersii Boulenger, 1917

Synonyms
- Bathybagrus stappersii (Boulenger, 1917)

Species of fish

Chrysichthys stappersii is a species of fish endemic to Lake Tanganyika on the border of Burundi, the Democratic Republic of the Congo, Tanzania, and Zambia. It grows to a length of 45.0 cm (17.7 in) SL and is a component of local subsistence fisheries.
