= Johann Marcusen =

Baltic German ichthyologist

Johann Marcusen (29 June 1817–10 July 1894) was a Baltic German ichthyologist.

== Life and work ==
Johann Marcusen was born in Jelgava in present-day Latvia. He studied in Saint Petersburg and Tartu. Between 1851 and 1854 he conducted scientific journeys to the Mediterranean Sea, Syria and Egypt. In 1854 he was made a professor, and worked as a professor of zoology in Odessa from 1858. After his retirement in 1873 he moved to Switzerland, where he spent the rest of his life.

The elephantfish genus Marcusenius is named after him.
