= Haplochromis worthingtoni =

Conservation status
- Data Deficient (IUCN 3.1)

Scientific classification
- Kingdom: Animalia
- Phylum: Chordata
- Class: Actinopterygii
- Order: Cichliformes
- Family: Cichlidae
- Genus: Haplochromis
- Species: H. worthingtoni

Binomial name
- Haplochromis worthingtoni Regan, 1929

Synonyms
- Harpagochromis worthingtoni (Regan, 1929)

Species of fish

Haplochromis worthingtoni is a species of cichlid endemic to Lake Kyoga in Uganda. This species reaches a length of 14.1 centimetres (5.6 in) SL. The specific name honours the explorer E. Barton Worthington (1905–2001) who collected the type of this species with type with Michael Graham.
