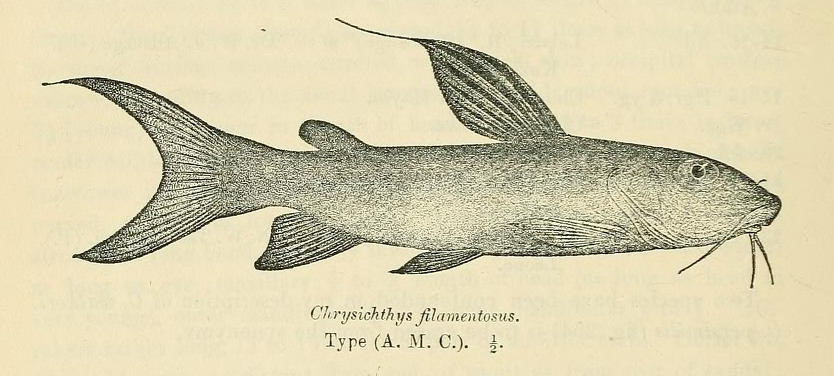
- Chrysichthys auratus

Scientific classification
- Kingdom: Animalia
- Phylum: Chordata
- Class: Actinopterygii
- Order: Siluriformes
- Family: Claroteidae
- Subfamily: Claroteinae
- Genus: Chrysichthys; Bleeker, 1858

Type species
- Pimelodus auratus É. Geoffroy St. Hilaire, 1809

Species
- See text

= Chrysichthys =

Chrysichthys Temporal range: Middle Eocene to present

Genus of fishes

Chrysichthys is a genus of claroteid catfishes native to Africa. Two fossil species are known. Chrysichthys macrotis, Van Neer, 1994, is known from the Miocene-Pliocene of the Albertine Rift in Uganda and Chrysichthys mahengeensis, Murray & Budney, 2003, is known from the Eocene of the Mahenge Formation, Tanzania.

== Species ==
There are currently 45 recognized species in this genus:

- Chrysichthys acsiorum Hardman, 2008
- Chrysichthys aluuensis Risch, 1985
- Chrysichthys ansorgii Boulenger, 1910
- Chrysichthys auratus (É. Geoffroy Saint-Hilaire, 1809)
- Chrysichthys bocagii Boulenger, 1910
- Chrysichthys brachynema Boulenger, 1900 (Kibonde, salmontail catfish)
- Chrysichthys brevibarbis (Boulenger, 1899)
- Chrysichthys cranchii (Leach, 1818) (Kokuni, Kamba)
- Chrysichthys dageti Risch, 1992
- Chrysichthys delhezi Boulenger, 1899
- Chrysichthys dendrophorus (Poll, 1966)
- Chrysichthys duttoni Boulenger, 1905
- Chrysichthys furcatus Günther, 1864
- Chrysichthys grandis Boulenger, 1917
- Chrysichthys graueri Steindachner, 1911
- Chrysichthys habereri Steindachner, 1912
- Chrysichthys helicophagus T. R. Roberts & D. J. Stewart, 1976
- Chrysichthys johnelsi Daget, 1959
- Chrysichthys laticeps Pellegrin, 1932
- Chrysichthys levequei Risch, 1988
- Chrysichthys longibarbis (Boulenger, 1899)
- Chrysichthys longidorsalis Risch & Thys van den Audenaerde, 1981
- Chrysichthys longipinnis (Boulenger, 1899) (Aluminum catfish)
- Chrysichthys macropterus Boulenger, 1920
- Chrysichthys maurus (Valenciennes, 1840)
- Chrysichthys nigrodigitatus (Lacépède, 1803) (Bagrid catfish)
- Chrysichthys nyongensis Risch & Thys van den Audenaerde, 1985
- Chrysichthys ogooensis (Pellegrin, 1900)
- Chrysichthys okae Fowler, 1949
- Chrysichthys persimilis Günther, 1899
- Chrysichthys platycephalus Worthington & Ricardo, 1937
- Chrysichthys polli Risch, 1987
- Chrysichthys praecox Hardman & Stiassny, 2008
- Chrysichthys punctatus Boulenger, 1899
- Chrysichthys rueppelli Boulenger, 1907
- Chrysichthys sharpii Boulenger, 1901 (Shovelnose catfish)
- Chrysichthys sianenna Boulenger, 1906
- Chrysichthys stappersii Boulenger, 1917
- Chrysichthys teugelsi Risch, 1987
- Chrysichthys thonneri Steindachner, 1912
- Chrysichthys thysi Risch, 1985
- Chrysichthys turkana Hardman, 2008
- Chrysichthys uniformis Pellegrin, 1922
- Chrysichthys wagenaari Boulenger, 1899
- Chrysichthys walkeri Günther, 1899

Synonyms

- Chrysichthys depressus (Nichols & Griscom, 1917); valid as Gnathobagrus depressus
- Chrysichthys hildae Bell-Cross, 1973; valid as Amarginops hildae (Hilda's grunter)
- Chrysichthys mabusi Boulenger, 1905; valid as Amarginops mabusi
- Chrysichthys ornatus Boulenger, 1902; valid as Amarginops ornatus (Ornate bagrid)
