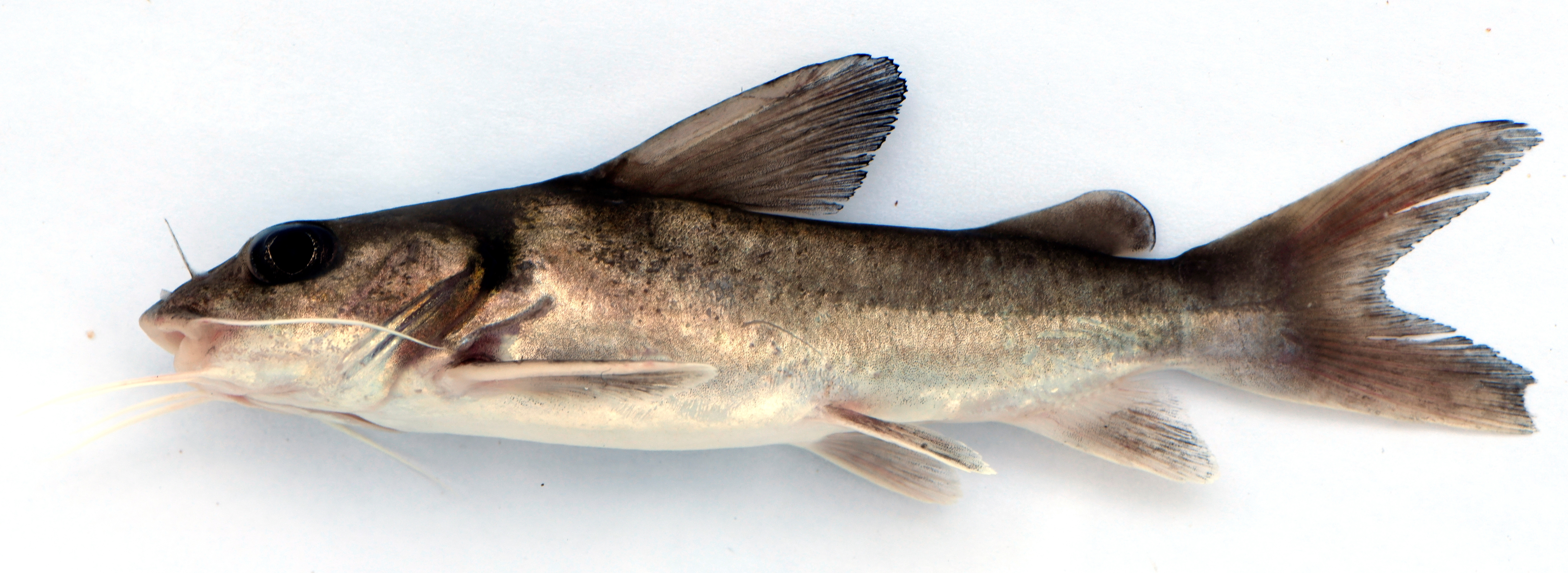

Conservation status
- Least Concern (IUCN 3.1)

Scientific classification
- Kingdom: Animalia
- Phylum: Chordata
- Class: Actinopterygii
- Order: Siluriformes
- Family: Claroteidae
- Genus: Chrysichthys
- Species: C. brachynema

Binomial name
- Chrysichthys brachynema Boulenger, 1900

Synonyms
- Amarginops brachynema (Boulenger, 1900); Chrysichthys myriodon Boulenger, 1900

= Kibonde =

Species of fish

The Kibonde or salmontail catfish, Chrysichthys brachynema, is a Lake Tanganyikan catfish of the family Claroteidae, occasionally kept in aquariums. This fish may be listed as Amarginops brachynema.

This fish may reach up to 77 cm (30 in). It inhabits inshore areas of the lake and feeds mainly on crabs.

== In the aquarium ==
This fish is peaceful and very energetic. It will eat small fish as it gets larger. Feed with sinking pellets or small crabs and small frogs.

Use small grained gravel. Do not use gravel with sharp edges. Hiding places are not required as this catfish usually spend their days swimming up and down the glass until feeding time. Care should be taken when handling as the sharp dorsal and pectoral spines are covered in mucus that will irritate the skin. Can live in fresh or brackish water.

The water temperature should be kept between 21–30 °C (70–86 °F). It tolerates a pH 6.5-7.8.
