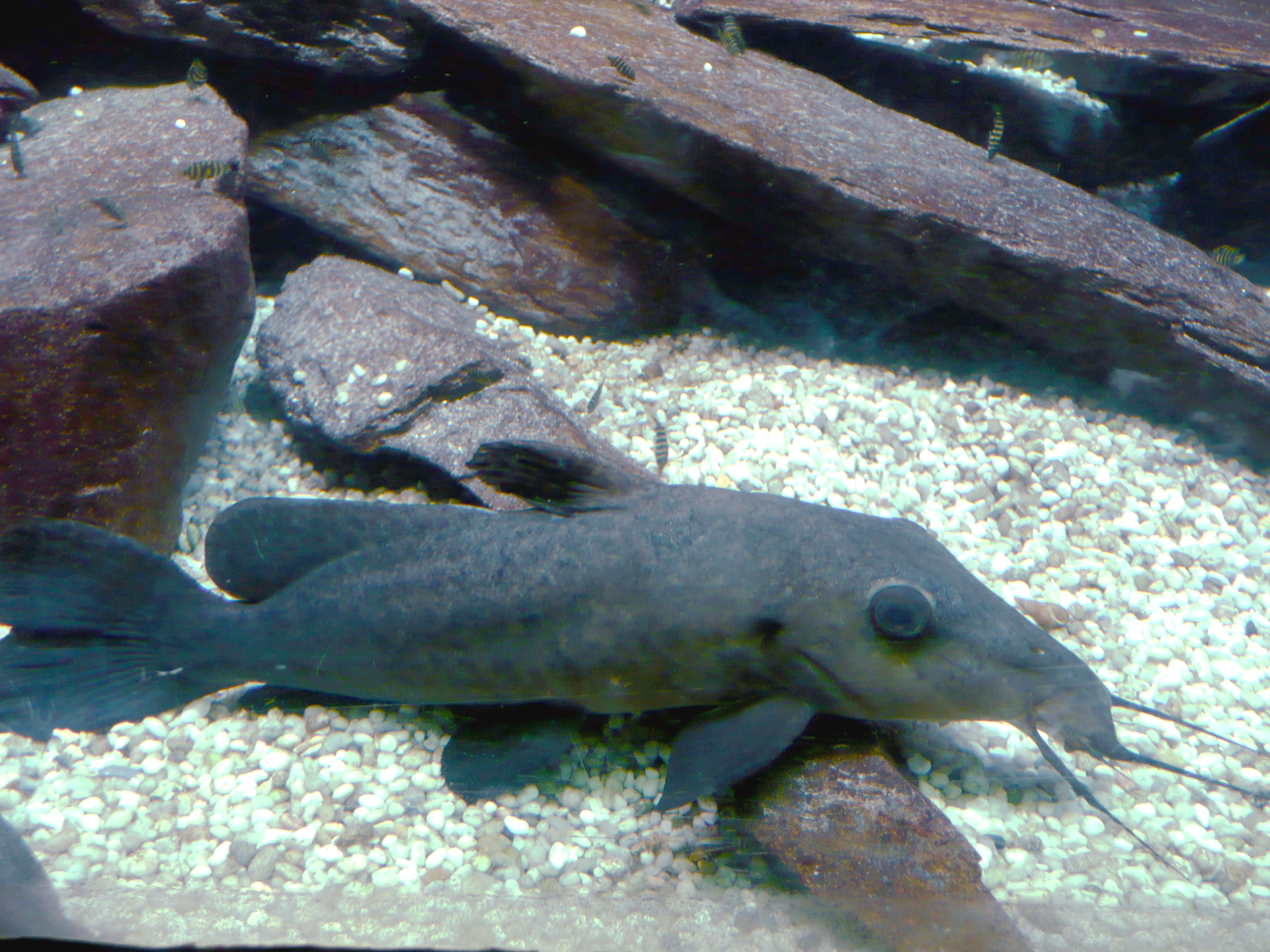
- Giraffe catfish (Auchenoglanis occidentalis)

Scientific classification
- Kingdom: Animalia
- Phylum: Chordata
- Class: Actinopterygii
- Order: Siluriformes
- Superfamily: Bagroidea
- Family: Auchenoglanididae; Jayaram, 1966

Genera
- Auchenoglanis; Notoglanidium; Parauchenoglanis

= Auchenoglanididae =

Family of catfish native to freshwater habitats in tropical Africa

Auchenoglanididae, also known as flatnose catfishes, is a family of catfish native to freshwater habitats in tropical Africa. They were previously considered a subfamily of the family Claroteidae, but are now generally treated as a distinct family. The monophyly of Auchenoglanidinae is uncontested.

It contains the following genera:

- Auchenoglanis Günther, 1865
- Notoglanidium Günther, 1903
- Parauchenoglanis Boulenger, 1911
