= E. Barton Worthington =

British ecologist and science administrator

E. Barton Worthington CBE

Scientific Director, International Biological Programme
- In office 1964–1974

Deputy Director-General (Scientific), Nature Conservancy
- In office 1957–1965

Secretary-General, Scientific Council for Africa South of the Sahara
- In office 1951–1955

Personal details
- Born: Edgar Barton Worthington; 13 January 1905
- Died: 14 October 2001 (aged 96)
- Occupation: Ecologist, science administrator

Edgar Barton Worthington (13 January 1905 – 14 October 2001) was a British ecologist and science administrator.

== Biography ==
His parents were Edgar Worthington and Amy née Beale. His early education was at Rugby School, before he went up to gain a First in Zoology at Gonville and Caius College at Cambridge. After university, his work alternated between Britain and Africa. He took part in an African lakes expedition in 1927–31; and in an African research expedition 1934–37, for which he was awarded the Mungo Park Medal of the Royal Scottish Geographical Society.

He was secretary to and first full-time director of the Freshwater Biological Association 1937–46. He returned to Africa in the late 1940s as science and development advisor. He was deputy scientific director for the Nature Conservancy 1957–65, and scientific director of the International Biological Programme (IBP) 1964–74. His interests included water biology and international nature conservation, including the environmental impacts of drainage and irrigation. He was appointed CBE in 1977.

In 1930, Worthington married Stella Johnson, who had been a member of the earlier expeditions he had undertaken and who shared many of his interests. In 1933, they jointly published the book Inland Waters of Africa. They had three daughters, all of whom followed their parents' scientific inclinations. Stella Worthington died in 1978. Two years later, he married Harriet Stockton. He died on 14 December 2001.

== Taxa named in honour ==
Worthington is commemorated in the scientific name of a species of venomous viper, Bitis worthingtoni, which is endemic to the high central Rift Valley of Kenya; and in the names of the Lake Victoria endemic cichlids Haplochromis bartoni and H. worthingtoni.

== Partial bibliography ==
- 1933: Inland Waters of Africa: The Result of Two Expeditions to the Great Lakes of Kenya and Uganda, with Accounts of Their Biology, Native Tribes and Development (with Stella Worthington), Macmillan and co Ltd
- 1938: SCIENCE IN AFRICA: A REVIEW OF SCIENTIFIC RESEARCH RELATING TO TROPICAL AND SOUTHERN AFRICA, Oxford University Press, London, New York, Toronto.
- 1951: Life in Lakes and Rivers (with T. T. Macan). New Naturalist #15. Collins, London.
- 1983: The Ecological Century: A Personal Appraisal. Oxford University Press. ISBN 978-0198545569
- 2009: The Evolution of IBP (editor). Cambridge University Press. ISBN 978-0521116114 (this overall account was first published in 1975)

== See also ==
- Category:Taxa named by E. Barton Worthington
- E. Barton Worthington Papers at Ohio University Libraries
