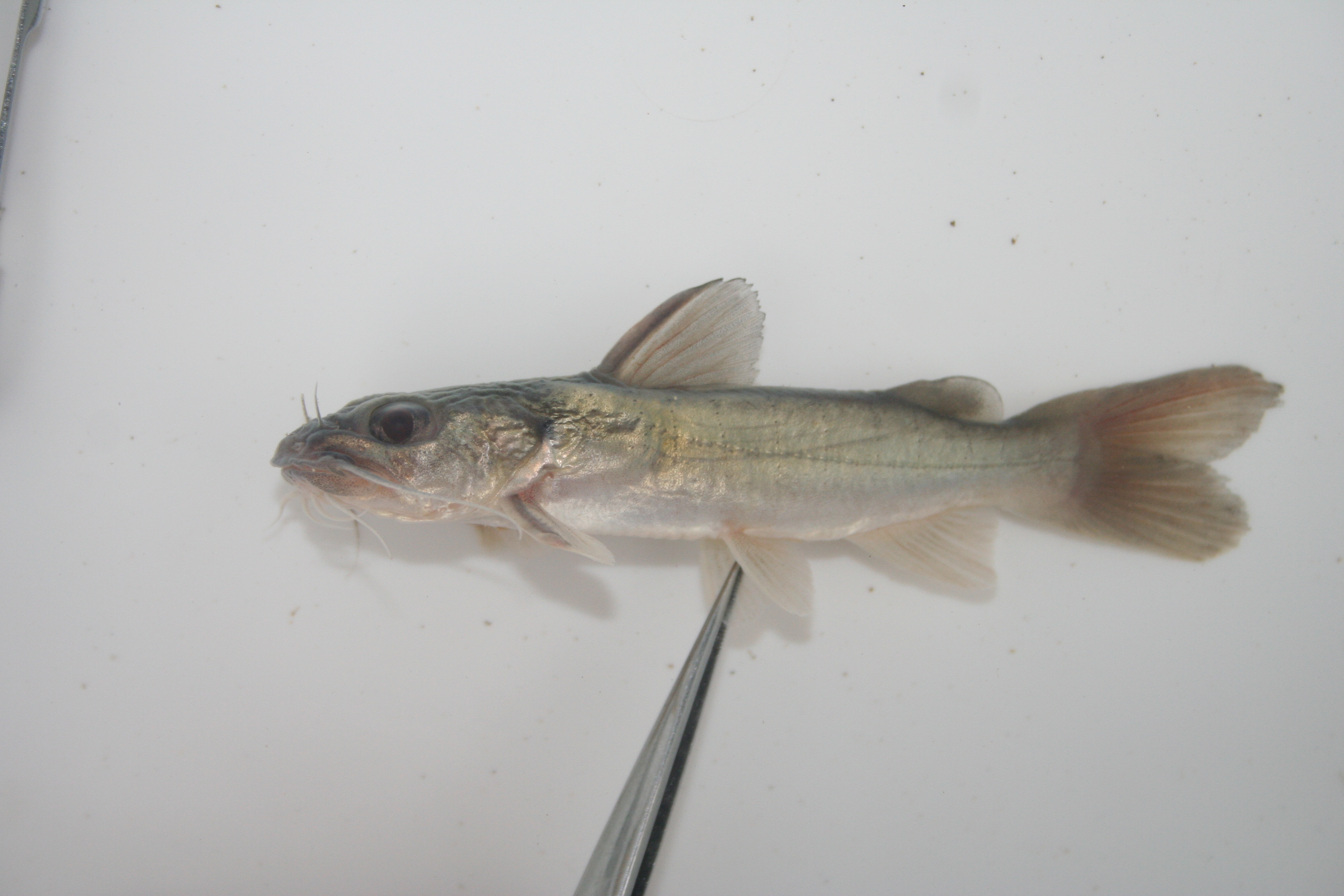
- Chrysichthys ansorgii

Scientific classification
- Kingdom: Animalia
- Phylum: Chordata
- Class: Actinopterygii
- Division: Teleostei
- Order: Siluriformes
- Superfamily: Bagroidea
- Family: Claroteidae; Bleeker, 1862

Genera
- Amarginops; Bathybagrus; Chrysichthys; Clarotes; Gephyroglanis; Gnathobagrus; Lophiobagrus; Pardiglanis; Phyllonemus †Eaglesomia †Nigerium ?†Fajumia

= Claroteidae =

Claroteidae Temporal range: Late Paleocene–present

Family of fishes

The Claroteidae are a family of catfish (order Siluriformes) found in Africa. This family was separated from Bagridae. However, the monophyly of the family is sometimes contested.

The 9 extant genera contain 66 known species of claroteids. The family Auchenoglanididae was formerly considered a subfamily of this family. This group was also often formerly placed in Bagridae. A well-known species is the African big-eye catfish, Chrysichthys longipinnis.

Claroteids have moderately elongated bodies, usually with four pairs of barbels, an adipose fin, and strong pectoral and dorsal fin spines.

The earliest known fossil member of the Claroteidae is Nigerium from the Late Paleocene and Early Eocene of Nigeria and Mali. The extinct genus Eaglesomia is also known from the Middle Eocene of Nigeria. The Late Eocene genus Fajumia from Egypt is of uncertain affinities, but most likely belongs to this group. In addition, extinct species of the extant genus Chrysichthys are known from the Middle Eocene of Tanzania, suggesting significant diversification by that point. In contrast to the freshwater nature of modern claroteids, most of these fossil genera are known from marine deposits. Although White (1934) postulated that this may be due to freshwater catfish remains being reworked into marine deposits, Murray & Homes (2021) suggested that these genera may represent extinct marine lineages of the family. This is further supported by the fact that much of catfish biogeography can only be explained through the marine dispersal of groups that are currently found only in freshwater.
