= Campylomormyrus orycteropus =

Conservation status
- Data Deficient (IUCN 3.1)

Scientific classification
- Kingdom: Animalia
- Phylum: Chordata
- Class: Actinopterygii
- Order: Osteoglossiformes
- Family: Mormyridae
- Genus: Campylomormyrus
- Species: C. orycteropus

Binomial name
- Campylomormyrus orycteropus Poll, J.-P. Gosse & Orts 1982

Species of fish

Campylomormyrus orycteropus is a species of electric fish in the family Mormyridae, found only in Lake Mweru. It is native to the Democratic Republic of the Congo.

== Size ==
This species reaches a length of 32.0 cm (12.6 in).

== Etymology ==
The fish is named for the aardvark genus Orycteropus, referring to the aardvark-like shape of its snout.
