= Synodontis ornatissimus =

Conservation status
- Least Concern (IUCN 3.1)

Scientific classification
- Kingdom: Animalia
- Phylum: Chordata
- Class: Actinopterygii
- Order: Siluriformes
- Family: Mochokidae
- Genus: Synodontis
- Species: S. ornatissimus

Binomial name
- Synodontis ornatissimus Gosse, 1982

Species of fish

Synodontis ornatissimus is a species of upside-down catfish that is endemic to the Democratic Republic of the Congo where it is found in the Ubangi River drainage. It was first described by Jean-Pierre Gosse in 1982. The original specimens were obtained in Poko, in what is now the Democratic Republic of the Congo. The species name ornatissimus means "very ornate or decorated", referring to the coloration of the fish, with many black spots on the body and dorsal fin, and black bands on the tail.

== Description ==
Like all members of the genus Synodontis, S. ornatissimus has a strong, bony head capsule that extends back as far as the first spine of the dorsal fin. The head contains a distinct narrow, bony, external protrusion called a humeral process. The fish has three pairs of barbels. The maxillary barbels are on located on the upper jaw, and two pairs of mandibular barbels are on the lower jaw. The adipose fin is large and the tail, or caudal fin, is forked.

The front edges of the dorsal fins and the pectoral fins are hardened into stiff spines. These spines can be raised into position at right angles to the body and locked into position for defensive purposes. The ability to lock the spines into place comes from several small bones attached to the spine, and once raised, the spines cannot be folded down by exerting pressure on the tip.

The fish has a structure called a premaxillary toothpad, which is located on the very front of the upper jaw of the mouth. This structure contains several rows of short, chisel-shaped teeth. On the lower jaw, or mandible, the teeth are attached to flexible, stalk-like structures and described as "s-shaped" or "hooked".

The maximum total length of the species is 21.1 centimeters (8.3 in). Generally, females in the genus Synodontis tend to be slightly larger than males of the same age.

== Habitat and behavior ==
In the wild, the species occurs in the northern Congo River basin. It is harvested for human consumption. The species faces threats from water pollution caused by mining and human population, deforestation, and fishing with poison. As a whole, species of Synodontis are omnivores, consuming insect larvae, algae, gastropods, bivalves, sponges, crustaceans, and the eggs of other fishes. The reproductive habits of most of the species of Synodontis are not known, beyond some instances of obtaining egg counts from gravid females. Spawning likely occurs during the flooding season between July and October, and pairs swim in unison during spawning. The growth rate is rapid in the first year, then slows down as the fish age.
