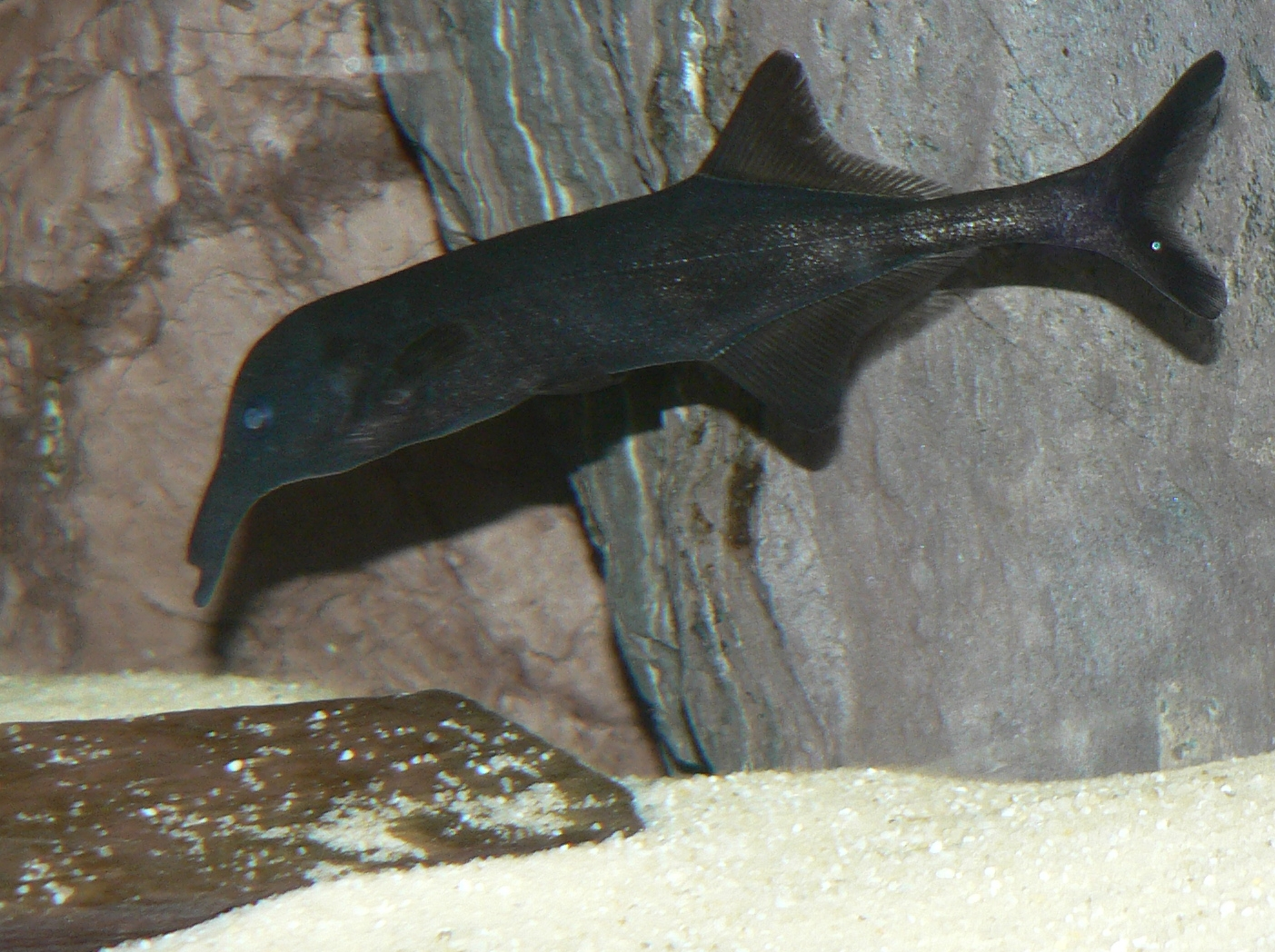
- Campylomormyrus elephas

Scientific classification
- Kingdom: Animalia
- Phylum: Chordata
- Class: Actinopterygii
- Order: Osteoglossiformes
- Family: Mormyridae
- Genus: Campylomormyrus; Bleeker, 1874

Type species
- Mormyrus tamandua Günther, 1864

= Campylomormyrus =

Genus of ray-finned fishes

Campylomormyrus is a genus of elephantfish in the family Mormyridae.

== Species ==
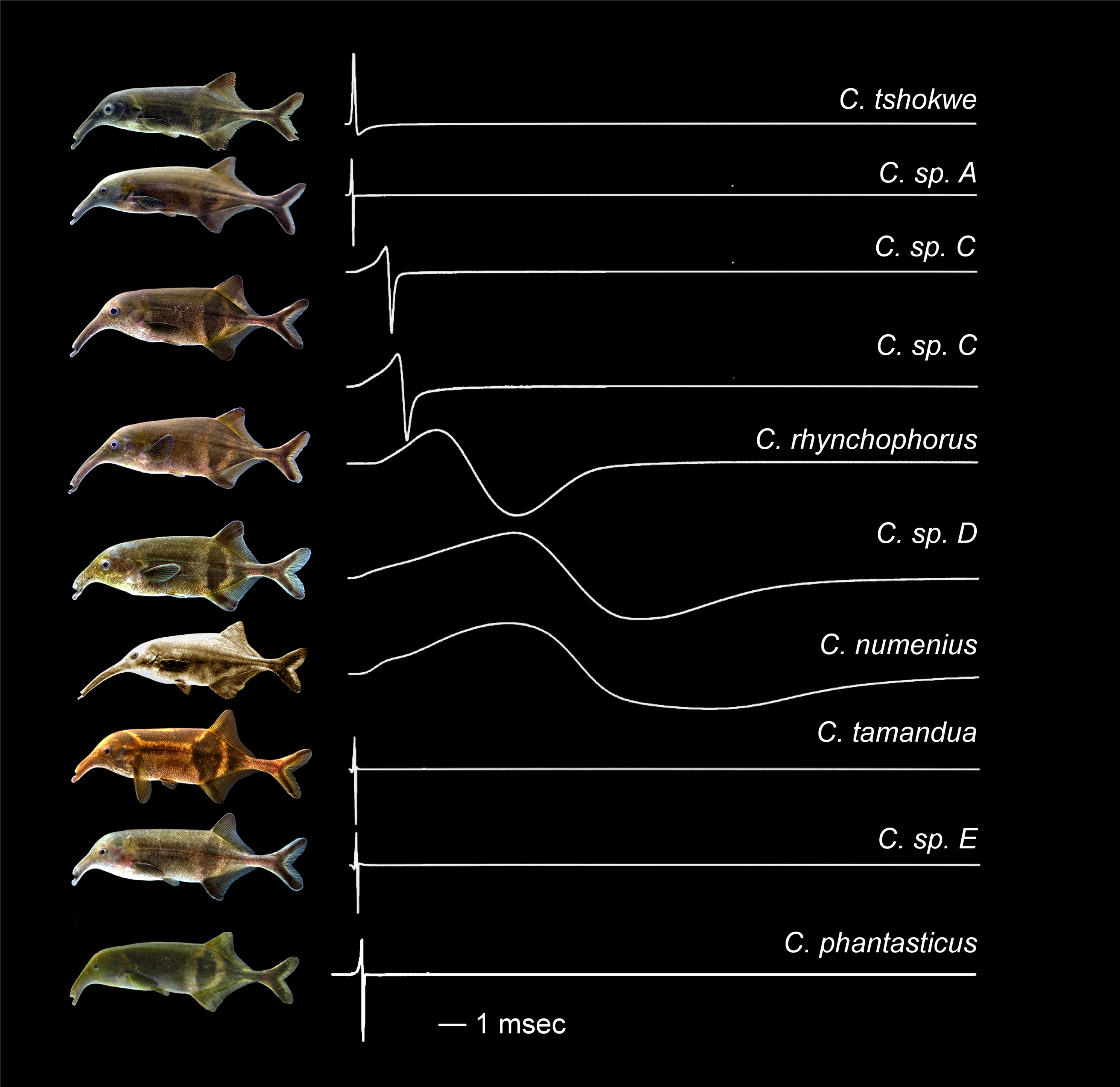
Several Campylomormyrus species and their electric organ discharges

There are currently 15 recognized species in this genus:.

- Campylomormyrus alces (Boulenger 1920) (Stanley Falls elephantfish)
- Campylomormyrus bredoi (Poll 1945) (Mweru elephantfish)
- Campylomormyrus cassaicus (Poll 1967) (donkey-faced elephant nose)
- Campylomormyrus christyi (Boulenger 1920) (Christy's elephantfish)
- Campylomormyrus compressirostris (Pellegrin 1924)
- Campylomormyrus curvirostris (Boulenger 1898) (Matadi elephantfish)
- Campylomormyrus elephas (Boulenger 1898) (elephant-trunk mormyrid)
- Campylomormyrus luapulaensis (L. R. David & Poll 1937) (Kabunda elephantfish)
- Campylomormyrus mirus (Boulenger 1898) (Upoto elephantfish)
- Campylomormyrus numenius (Boulenger 1898) (Upoto elephantfish)
- Campylomormyrus orycteropus Poll, J. P. Gosse & Orts 1982 (Pweto elephantfish)
- Campylomormyrus phantasticus (Pellegrin 1927) (fantastic elephantfish)
- Campylomormyrus rhynchophorus (Boulenger 1898) (double-trunk elephant nose)
- Campylomormyrus tamandua (Günther 1864) (Worm-jawed elephantfish)
- Campylomormyrus tshokwe (Poll 1967) (Dundo elephantfish)
