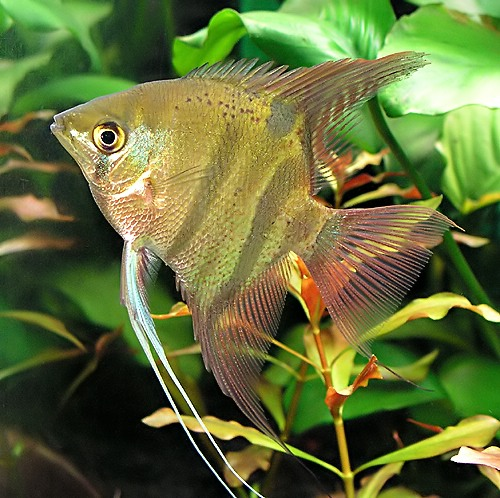

Scientific classification
- Domain: Eukaryota
- Kingdom: Animalia
- Phylum: Chordata
- Class: Actinopterygii
- Order: Cichliformes
- Family: Cichlidae
- Genus: Pterophyllum
- Species: P. leopoldi

Binomial name
- Pterophyllum leopoldi (J. P. Gosse, 1963)
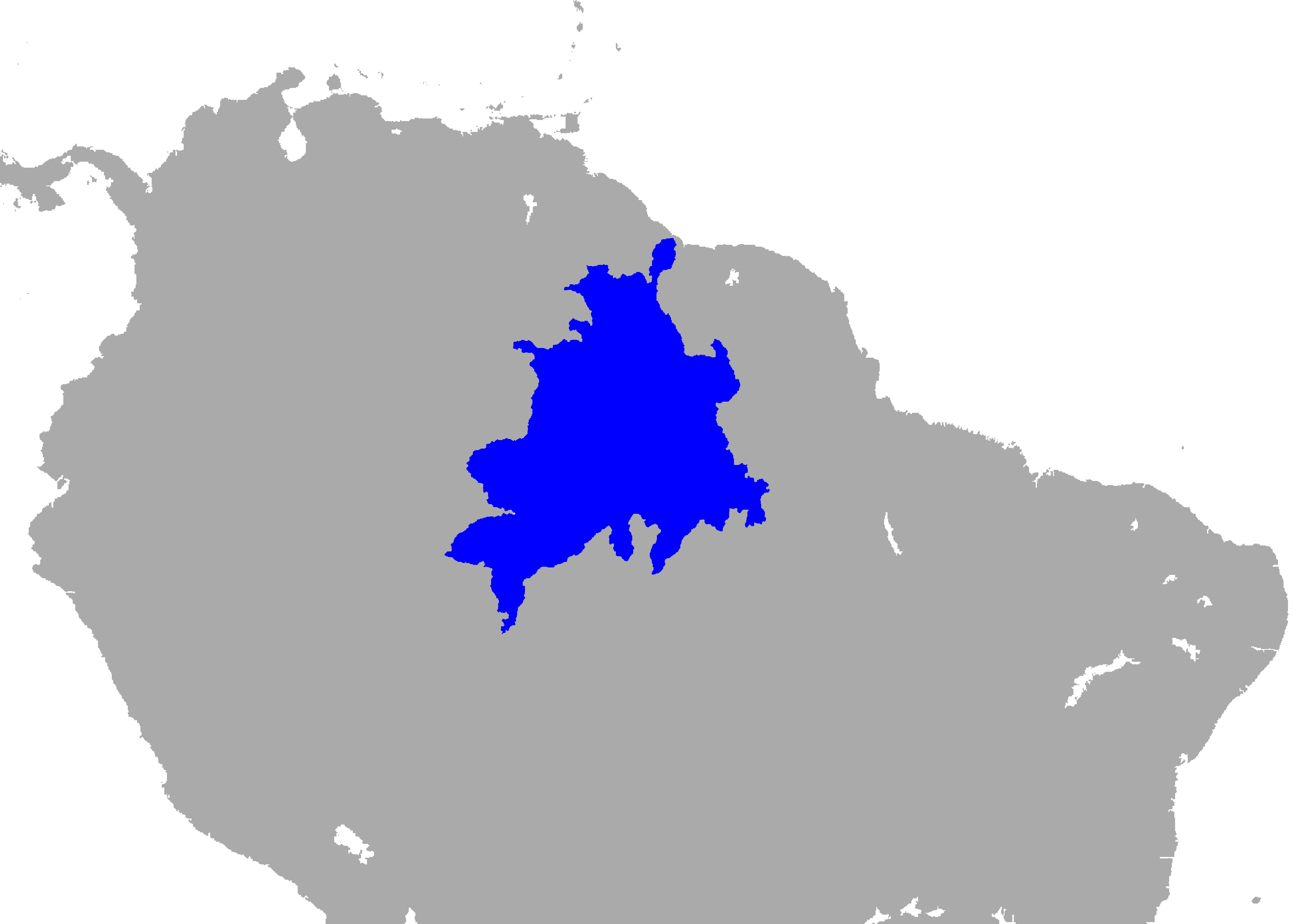

Synonyms
- Plataxoides leopoldi J. P. Gosse, 1963

= Pterophyllum leopoldi =

Species of fish

Pterophyllum leopoldi, also referred to as the teardrop angelfish, Leopold's angelfish dwarf angelfish, or roman-nosed angelfish, is an angelfish species native to the Amazon River (between Manacapuru and Santarém), Essequibo River and Rupununi River.

It is distinguished from other members of the genus Pterophyllum by the absence of a pre-dorsal notch, and by the presence of a black blotch at the dorsal insertion on the 4th vertical bar.

The species is frequently misidentified as P. dumerilii when it is imported in the aquarium trade. P. leopoldi is the smallest of the angelfish species, reaching a length of 10 centimetres (3.9 in) SL and a height of 15 centimetres (5.9 in)SL.

The specific name honours King Leopold III of Belgium, who sponsored the expedition to the Amazon that collected the type of this species.
