= Campylomormyrus phantasticus =

Conservation status
- Least Concern (IUCN 3.1)

Scientific classification
- Kingdom: Animalia
- Phylum: Chordata
- Class: Actinopterygii
- Order: Osteoglossiformes
- Family: Mormyridae
- Genus: Campylomormyrus
- Species: C. phantasticus

Binomial name
- Campylomormyrus phantasticus (Pellegrin 1927)

Synonyms
- Gnathonemus phantasticus Pellegrin 1927

Species of fish

Campylomormyrus phantasticus is a species of electric fish in the family Mormyridae, found only in the Sanaga River in Africa.

== Size ==
This species reaches a length of 37.0 cm (14.6 in).
