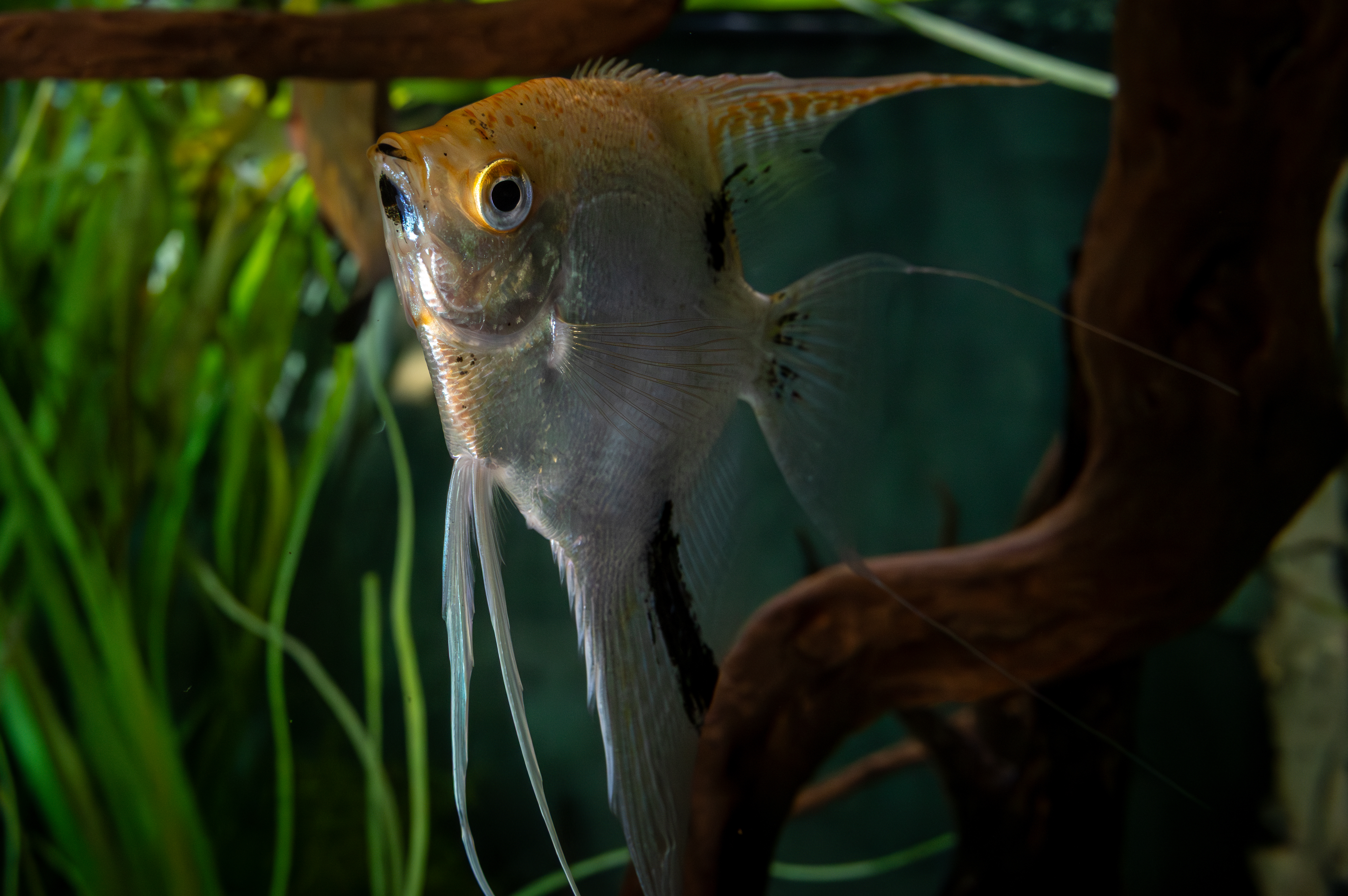

Conservation status
- Least Concern (IUCN 3.1)

Scientific classification
- Kingdom: Animalia
- Phylum: Chordata
- Class: Actinopterygii
- Order: Cichliformes
- Family: Cichlidae
- Genus: Pterophyllum
- Species: P. scalare

Binomial name
- Pterophyllum scalare (Schultze in Lichtenstein, 1823)
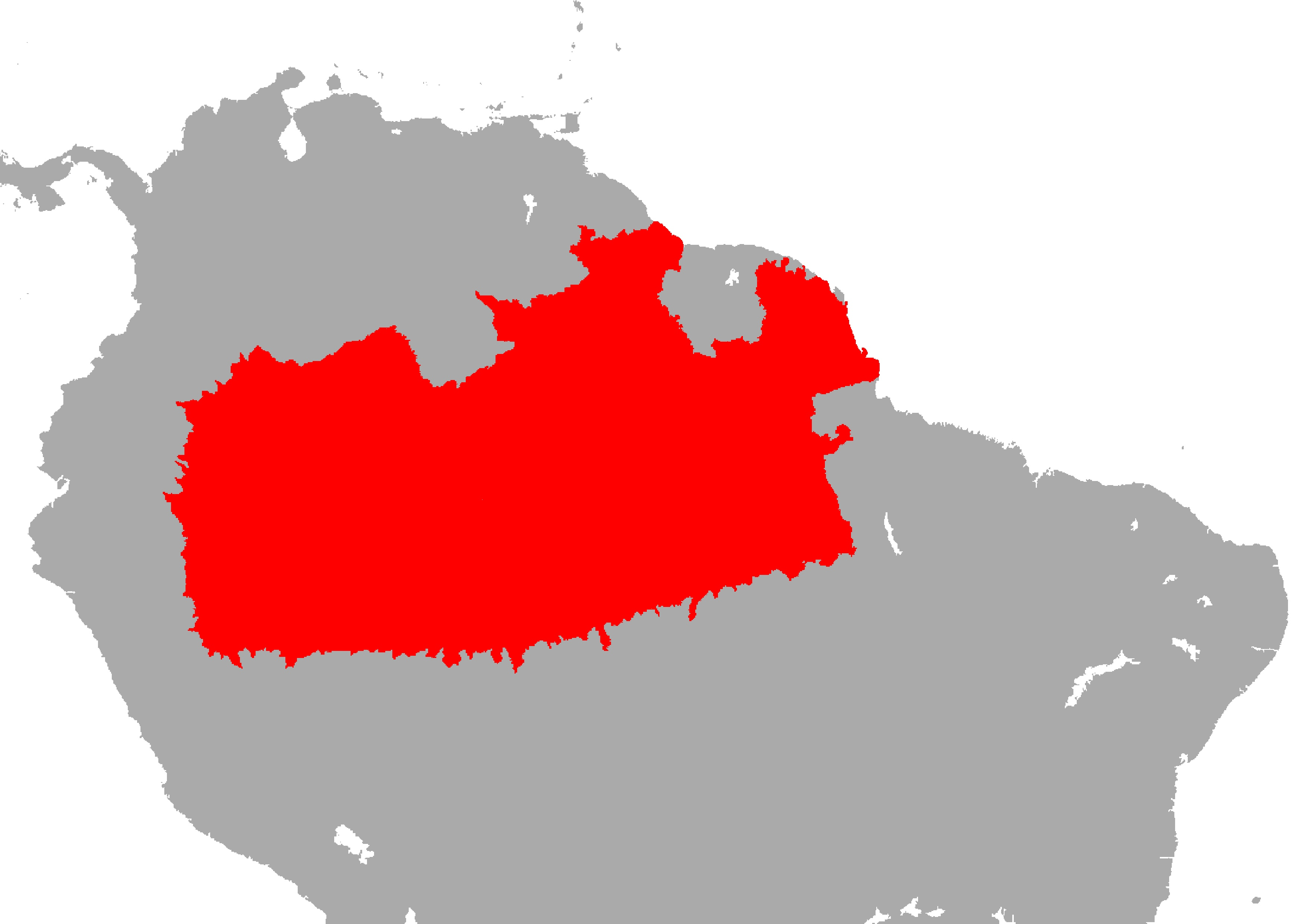

Synonyms
- Zeus scalaris Schultze, 1823; Platax scalaris G. Cuvier, 1831; Plataxoides dumerilii Castelnau, 1855; Pterophyllum dumerilii (Castelnau, 1855); Pterophyllum eimekei C. G. E. Ahl, 1928

= Pterophyllum scalare =

Species of fish

Pterophyllum scalare, most commonly referred to as angelfish or freshwater angelfish, is the most common species of Pterophyllum kept in captivity. It is native to the Amazon Basin in Peru, Colombia, and Brazil. Particularly to the Ucayali river in Peru, the Oyapock River in French Guiana, the Essequibo River in Guyana, the Solimões, the Amapá, and the Amazon rivers in Brazil. It is found in swamps or flooded grounds where vegetation is dense and the water is either clear or silty. Its native waters range from a neutral pH of 7.0 down to near 6.0, with a general water hardness (gH) range of 3 to 10 °dH, and water temperature ranging from 26 to 30 °C (75 to 86 °F). This is the species of angelfish most frequently found in the aquarium trade. A similar (cross-breeding possible) P. scalare exists in the Rio Orinoco. They are of the same size and shape, the only difference being the stripes; the Orinoco P. scalare has thinner, but dual, stripes.

The diet of Pterophyllum scalare consists of a wide spectrum of prey; they feed on tiny fish fry and younger, juvenile fishes, young and mature shrimps, crabs, prawns, various worms, mosquito larvae, and water bugs. Additionally, they will opportunistically catch any smaller-sized floating insects that have fallen onto the surface of the water.

In captivity, these are not picky fish; They readily feed on different types of frozen, freeze-dried and live foods, such as tubifex worms, bean beetles (and larvae), bloodworms, brine shrimp, daphnia, flour beetles, krill, springtails, small or finely-chopped earthworms, black soldier fly larvae and cultured wingless fruit flies (Drosophila melanogaster). In particular, the tubifex worms and fruit flies are high in protein and nutrients, resulting in highly significant growth. A predominantly live food diet also provides nutrients for better reproductive performance. Ultimately, food variety is key, for health, but also for mimicking natural feeding habits.

It was first described by Ferdinand Schultze in a catalog of specimens at the Zoological Museum of the Royal University of Berlin, published by Hinrich Lichtenstein in 1823. First import to Europe (Germany) by C.Ziggelkow, Hamburg in 1909

The genome of the angelfish was sequenced and assembled in 2022 by Indeever Madireddy, a high school student.
