= Campylomormyrus alces =

Conservation status
- Least Concern (IUCN 3.1)

Scientific classification
- Kingdom: Animalia
- Phylum: Chordata
- Class: Actinopterygii
- Order: Osteoglossiformes
- Family: Mormyridae
- Genus: Campylomormyrus
- Species: C. alces

Binomial name
- Campylomormyrus alces (Boulenger 1920)

Synonyms
- Gnathonemus alces Boulenger 1920

Species of fish

Campylomormyrus alces is a species of electric fish in the family Mormyridae, found in the Congo River basin in Democratic Republic of the Congo and Angola. Known to be nocturnal feeders, their primary diet consists of different types of invertebrates and plants.

== Size ==
This species reaches a length of 36.0 cm (14.2 in).
