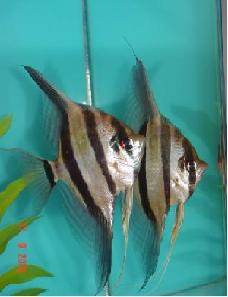

Conservation status
- Least Concern (IUCN 3.1)

Scientific classification
- Domain: Eukaryota
- Kingdom: Animalia
- Phylum: Chordata
- Class: Actinopterygii
- Order: Cichliformes
- Family: Cichlidae
- Genus: Pterophyllum
- Species: P. altum

Binomial name
- Pterophyllum altum Pellegrin, 1903
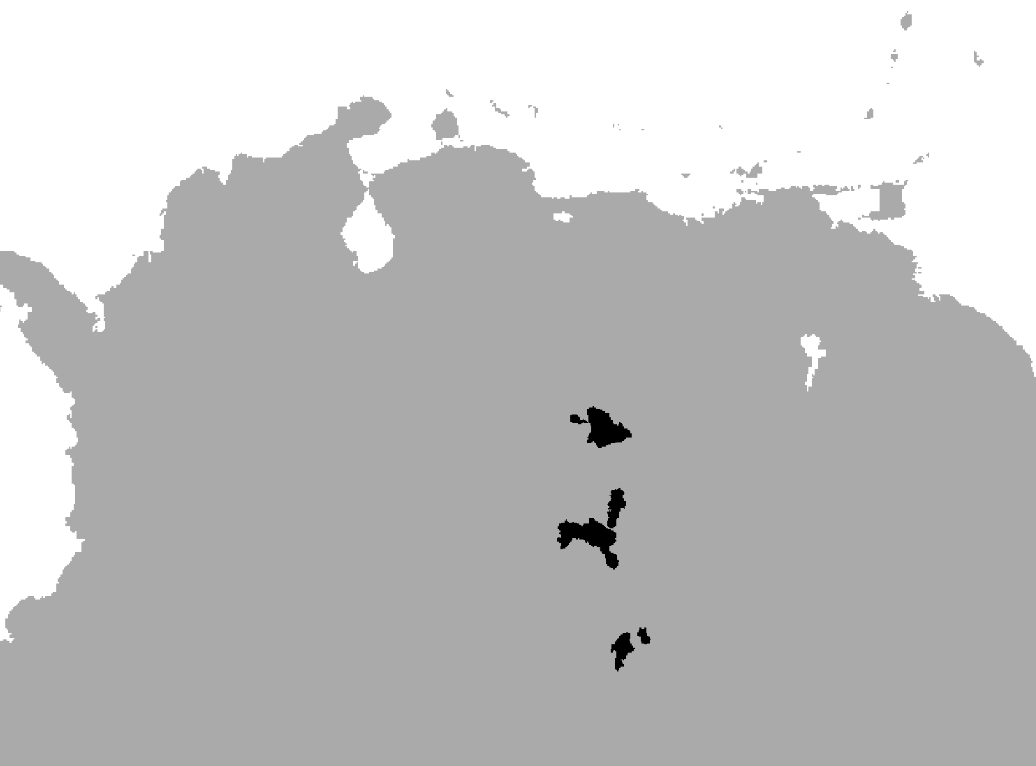

= Pterophyllum altum =

Species of fish

Pterophyllum altum, also referred to as the altum angelfish, deep angelfish, or Orinoco angelfish, occurs strictly in the Orinoco River Basin and the Upper Rio Negro watershed in Southern Venezuela, Southeastern Colombia and extreme Northern Brazil.

== Description ==
The species is the largest member in its genus and specimens may have a height (from tip of dorsal to tip of anal fin) of as much as 38 cm (15 in). Its natural base color is silver but with three brownish/red vertical stripes and red striations into the fins. The species may show red spotting and a blueish green dorsal overcast when mature and when aroused exhibits a black operculum spot. Characteristic of this species is an acute incision or notch above the nares (supraorbital indention). All true Orinoco altum specimens show this trait. The true wildcaught Orinoco altum is very difficult to breed in captivity. Most altum angelfish are more frequently found in the well oxygenated, extremely soft waters of Upper and Middle Orinoco tributaries shed from the Guiana Shield Highlands, preferring a pH range between 4.5 and 5.8. These are very transparent blackwaters with almost nil conductivity. Temperature range in these waters is between 78 and 84 °F (26 and 29 °C). They are also found in the Atabapo River and Inirida River floodplain, down the Casiquiare and Guainía floodplain where the Rio Negro is born, before entering Brazilian territory. Unlike P. scalare which prefer to spawn on the submerged leaves of plants and trees in the flooded rainforest, P. altum prefers to spawn on submerged roots and tree branches in a moderate water current. This species is recommended for intermediate to advanced aquarists due to the detailed maintenance it requires for proper health.

True Orinoco Altums are usually only available in aquarium shops from late summer until early winter due to the fact that their native river system's water level is only low enough to allow for successful fishing from July to October.
