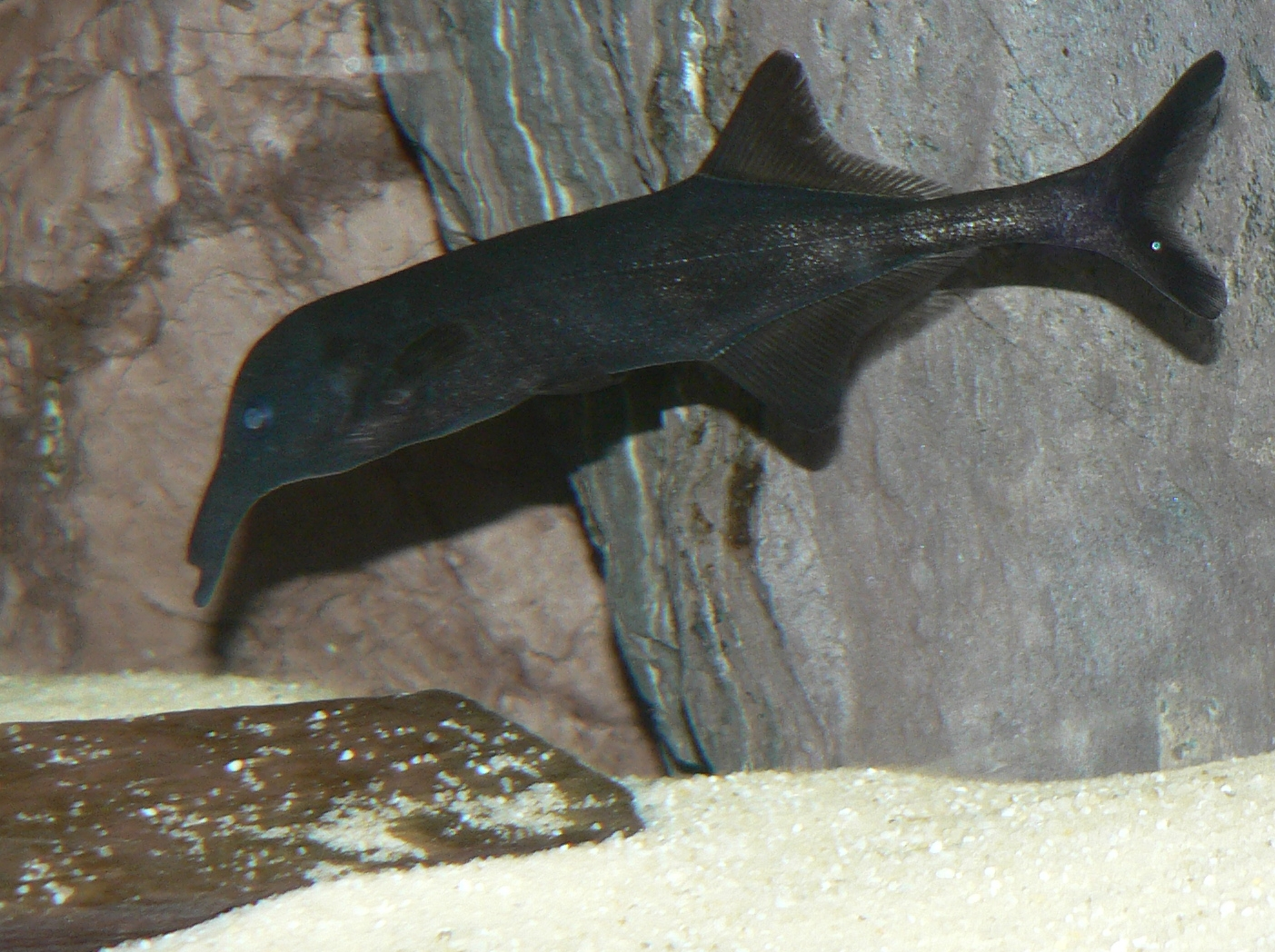
- Campylomormyrus elephas

Conservation status
- Least Concern (IUCN 3.1)

Scientific classification
- Kingdom: Animalia
- Phylum: Chordata
- Class: Actinopterygii
- Order: Osteoglossiformes
- Family: Mormyridae
- Genus: Campylomormyrus
- Species: C. elephas

Binomial name
- Campylomormyrus elephas (Boulenger 1898)

Synonyms
- Gnathonemus elephas Boulenger 1898

= Campylomormyrus elephas =

Species of fish

Campylomormyrus elephas, is a species of electric fish in the family Mormyridae, found in Africa, in the Congo River basin in Democratic Republic of the Congo and Angola.

== Size ==
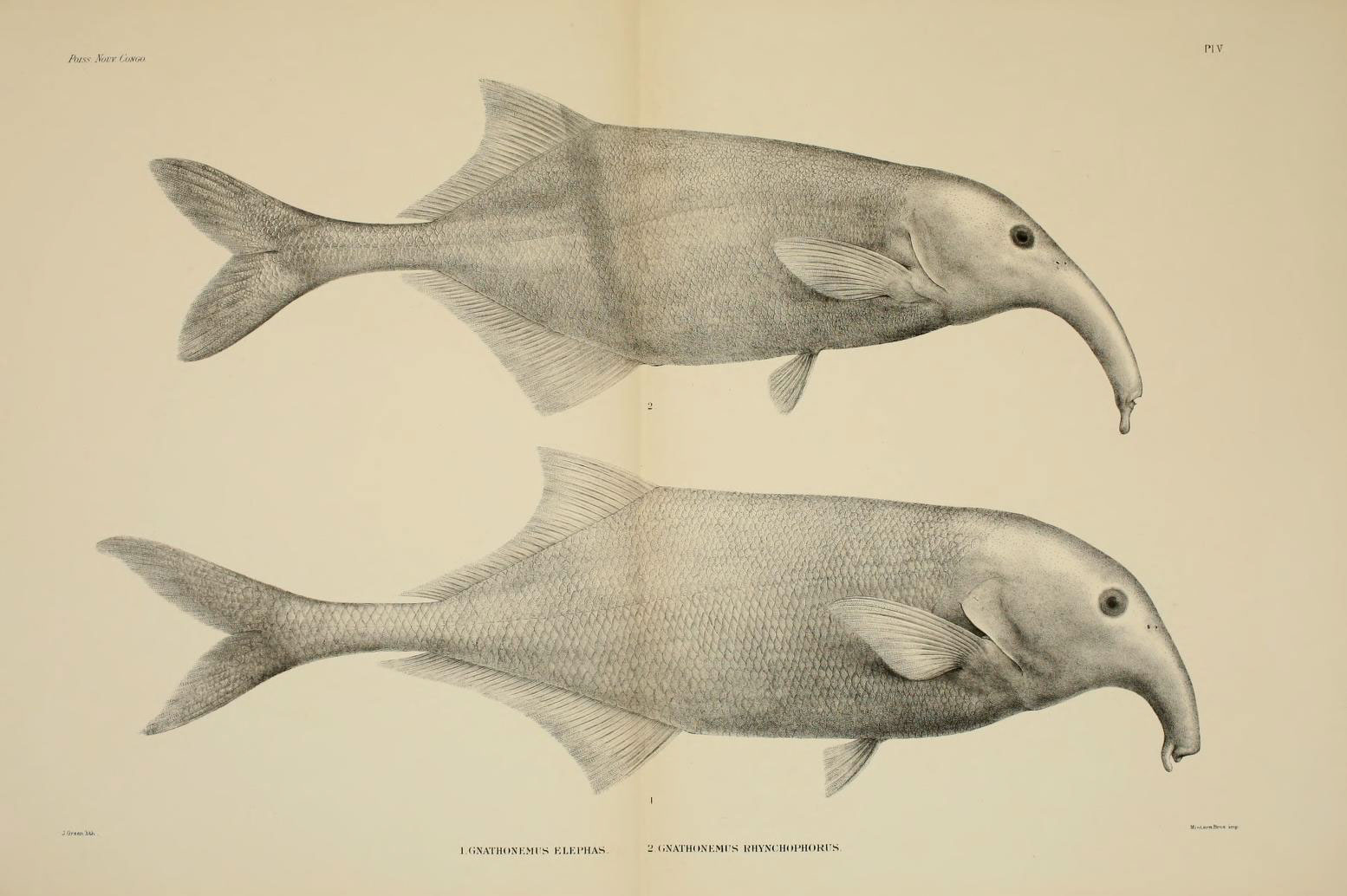

This species reaches a length of 40.0 cm (15.7 in).

== Etymology ==
The fishes species name is the word in Latin for elephant, probably referring to its long, elephant trunk-like snout.
