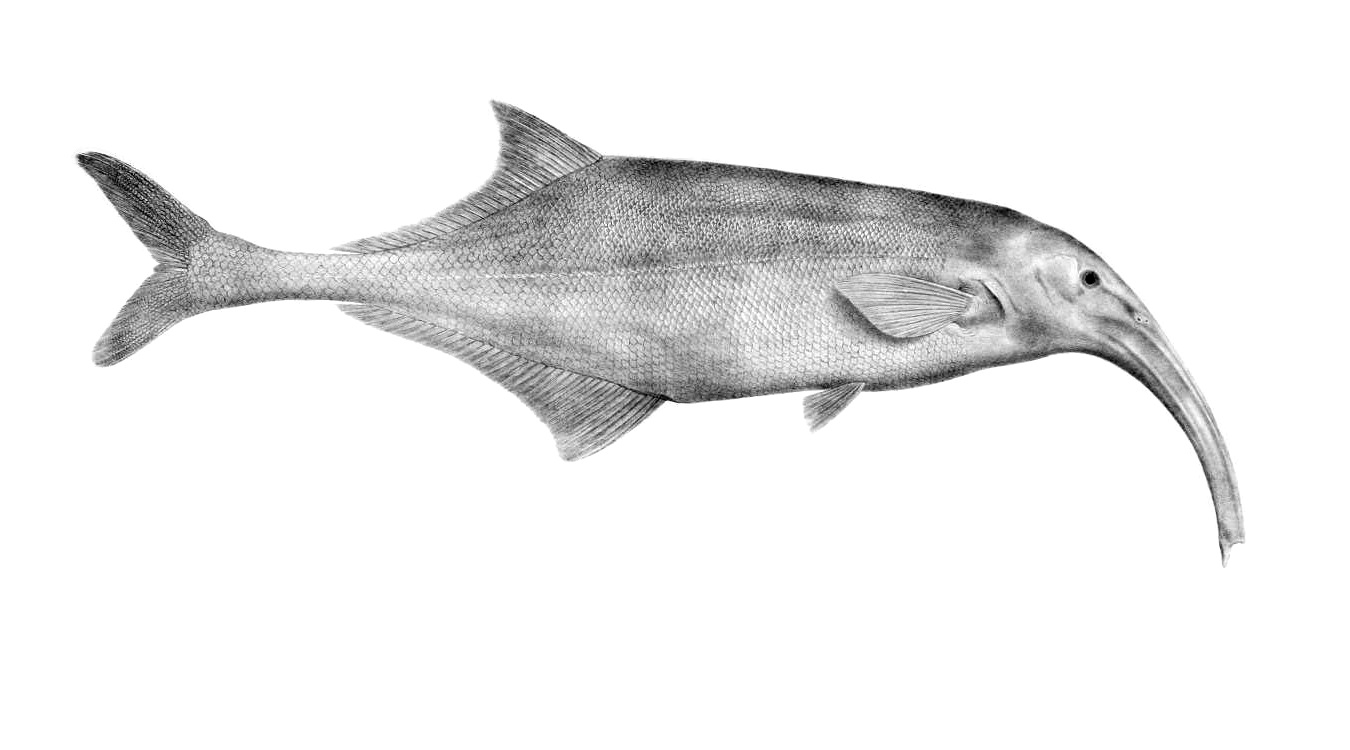

Conservation status
- Least Concern (IUCN 3.1)

Scientific classification
- Kingdom: Animalia
- Phylum: Chordata
- Class: Actinopterygii
- Order: Osteoglossiformes
- Family: Mormyridae
- Genus: Campylomormyrus
- Species: C. curvirostris

Binomial name
- Campylomormyrus curvirostris (Boulenger 1898)

Synonyms
- Gnathonemus curvirostris Boulenger 1898

= Campylomormyrus curvirostris =

Species of fish

Campylomormyrus curvirostris is a species of electric fish in the family Mormyridae, found in Africa: in the lower and middle Congo River basin in Cameroon, Democratic Republic of the Congo and Angola.

== Size ==
This species reaches a length of 40.5 cm (15.9 in).
