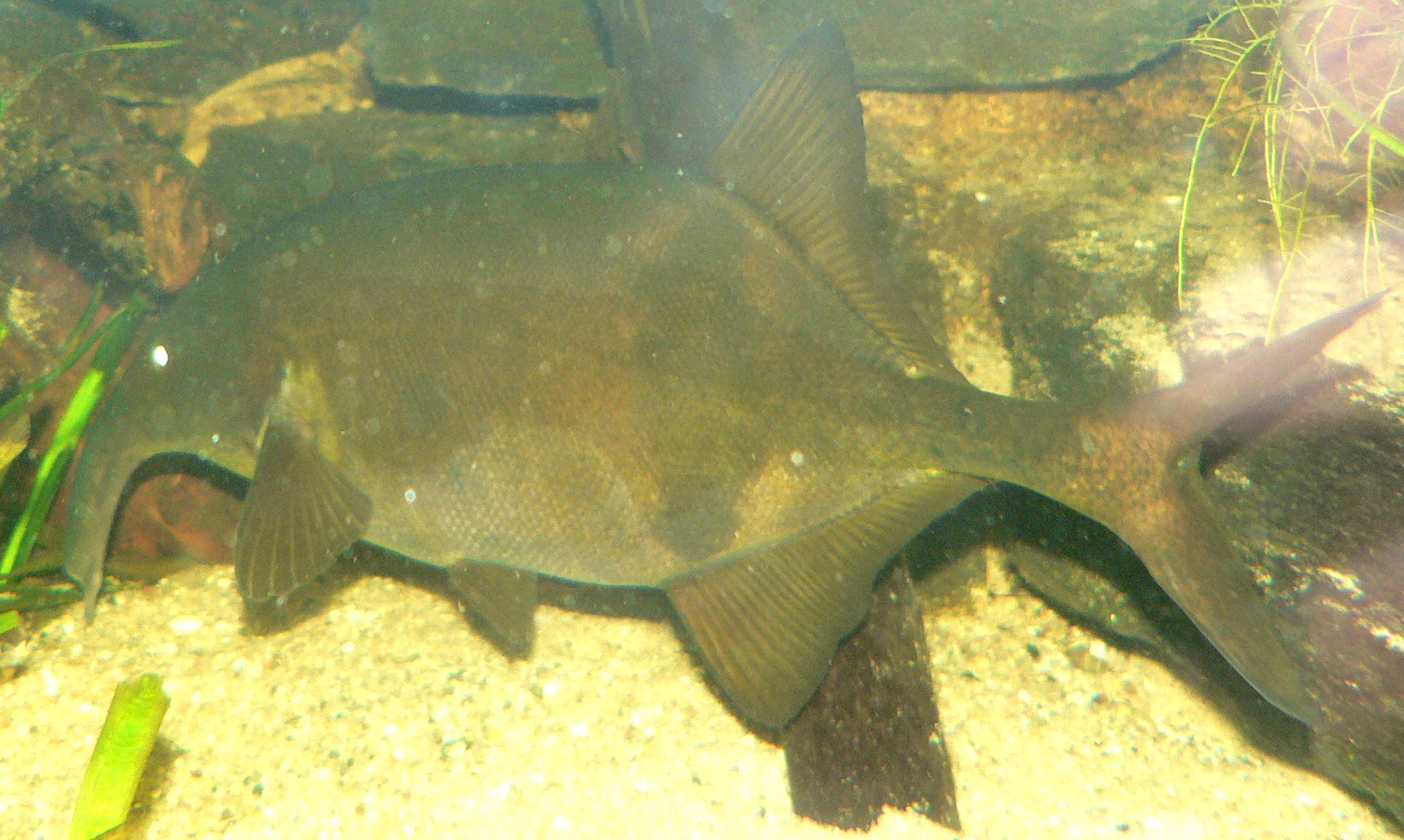

Conservation status
- Least Concern (IUCN 3.1)

Scientific classification
- Kingdom: Animalia
- Phylum: Chordata
- Class: Actinopterygii
- Order: Osteoglossiformes
- Family: Mormyridae
- Genus: Campylomormyrus
- Species: C. numenius

Binomial name
- Campylomormyrus numenius (Boulenger 1898)

Synonyms
- Gnathonemus numenius Boulenger 1898

= Campylomormyrus numenius =

Species of fish

Campylomormyrus numenius, is a species of electric fish in the family Mormyridae, found in Africa: in the Pool Malebo, in the middle Congo River and its northern tributaries, and in the Lualaba, in the Democratic Republic of the Congo.

== Size ==
This species reaches a length of 65.0 cm (25.6 in).
