= Campylomormyrus cassaicus =

Conservation status
- Data Deficient (IUCN 3.1)

Scientific classification
- Kingdom: Animalia
- Phylum: Chordata
- Class: Actinopterygii
- Order: Osteoglossiformes
- Family: Mormyridae
- Genus: Campylomormyrus
- Species: C. cassaicus

Binomial name
- Campylomormyrus cassaicus (Poll, 1967)

Synonyms
- Gnathonemus cassaicus Poll, 1945

Species of fish

Campylomormyrus cassaicus is a species of electric fish in the family Mormyridae. It is found in African rivers Luachimo in Angola and Sankuru in the Democratic Republic of the Congo and in the Kasai River drainage in the middle Congo River basin.

== Size ==
This species reaches a length of 20.0 cm (7.9 in).
