= Campylomormyrus bredoi =

Conservation status
- Vulnerable (IUCN 3.1)

Scientific classification
- Kingdom: Animalia
- Phylum: Chordata
- Class: Actinopterygii
- Order: Osteoglossiformes
- Family: Mormyridae
- Genus: Campylomormyrus
- Species: C. bredoi

Binomial name
- Campylomormyrus bredoi (Poll, 1945)

Synonyms
- Campylomormyrus rhynchophorus (non Boulenger, 1898); Gnathonemus bredoi Poll, 1945

Species of fish

The Mweru elephantfish, Campylomormyrus bredoi is a species of electric fish in the family Mormyridae, found only in Lake Mweru. It is native to the Democratic Republic of the Congo and can reach a size of approximately 370 mm (15 in).

Regarding its conservation status, according to the IUCN, this species can be classified in the "vulnerable (VU)" category.

== Size ==
This species reaches a length of 37.0 cm (14.6 in).

== Etymology ==
The fish is named in honor of the Belgian explorer Hans J. Brédo (1903–1991), who collected the holotype specimen.
