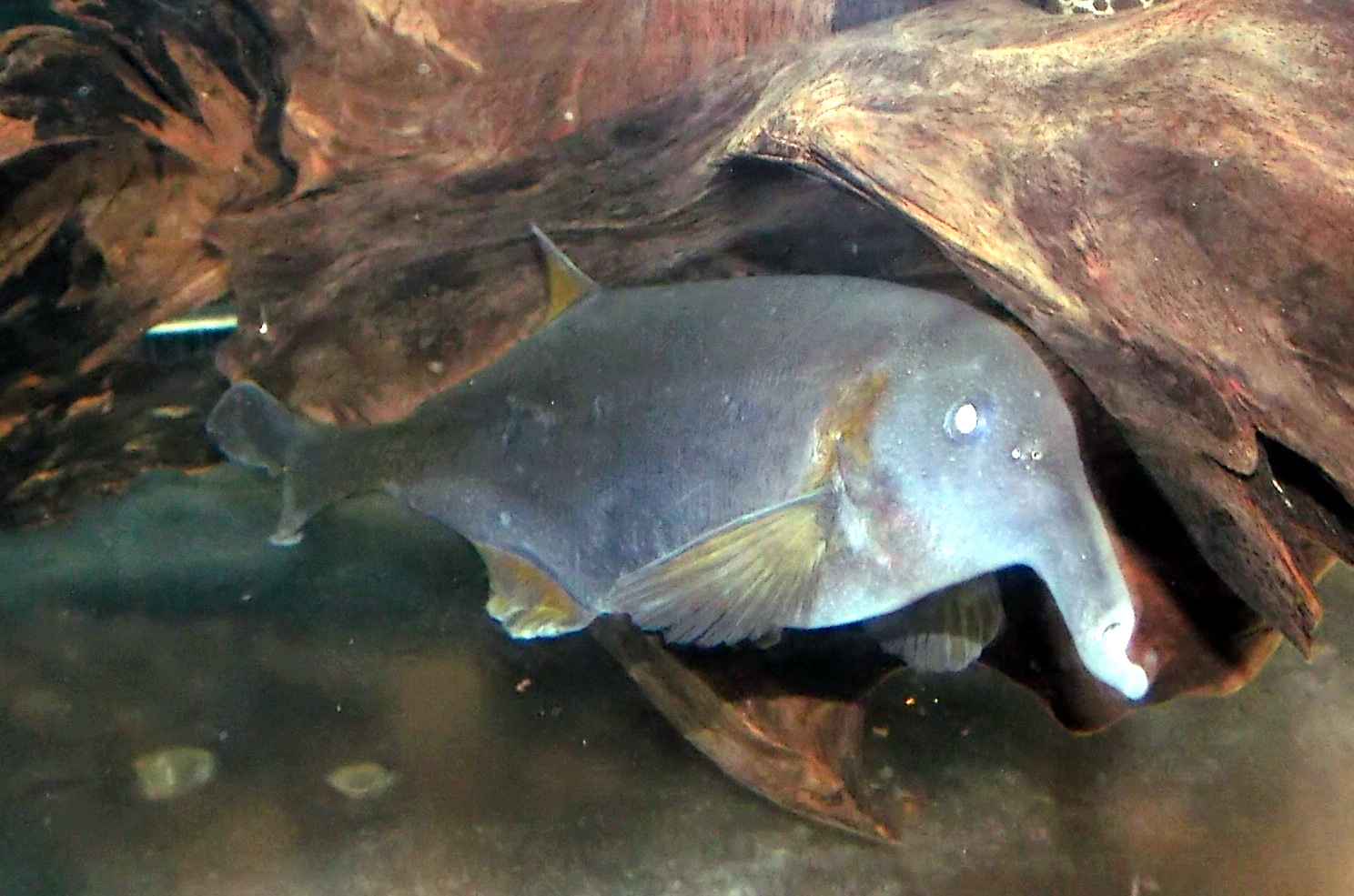

Conservation status
- Least Concern (IUCN 3.1)

Scientific classification
- Kingdom: Animalia
- Phylum: Chordata
- Class: Actinopterygii
- Order: Osteoglossiformes
- Family: Mormyridae
- Genus: Campylomormyrus
- Species: C. rhynchophorus

Binomial name
- Campylomormyrus rhynchophorus (Boulenger, 1898)

Synonyms
- Gnathonemus rhynchophorus Boulenger, 1898; Gnathonemus rhynchophorus lualabaensis David & Poll, 1937; Campylomormyrus lualabaensis (David & Poll, 1937); Gnathonemus lualabaensis David & Poll, 1937

= Campylomormyrus rhynchophorus =

double-trunk elephant nose

Species of fish

the double-trunk elephant nose, Campylomormyrus rhynchophorus is a species of electric fish in the family Mormyridae, found only in Africa. This species is listed as Least Concern by the IUCN.

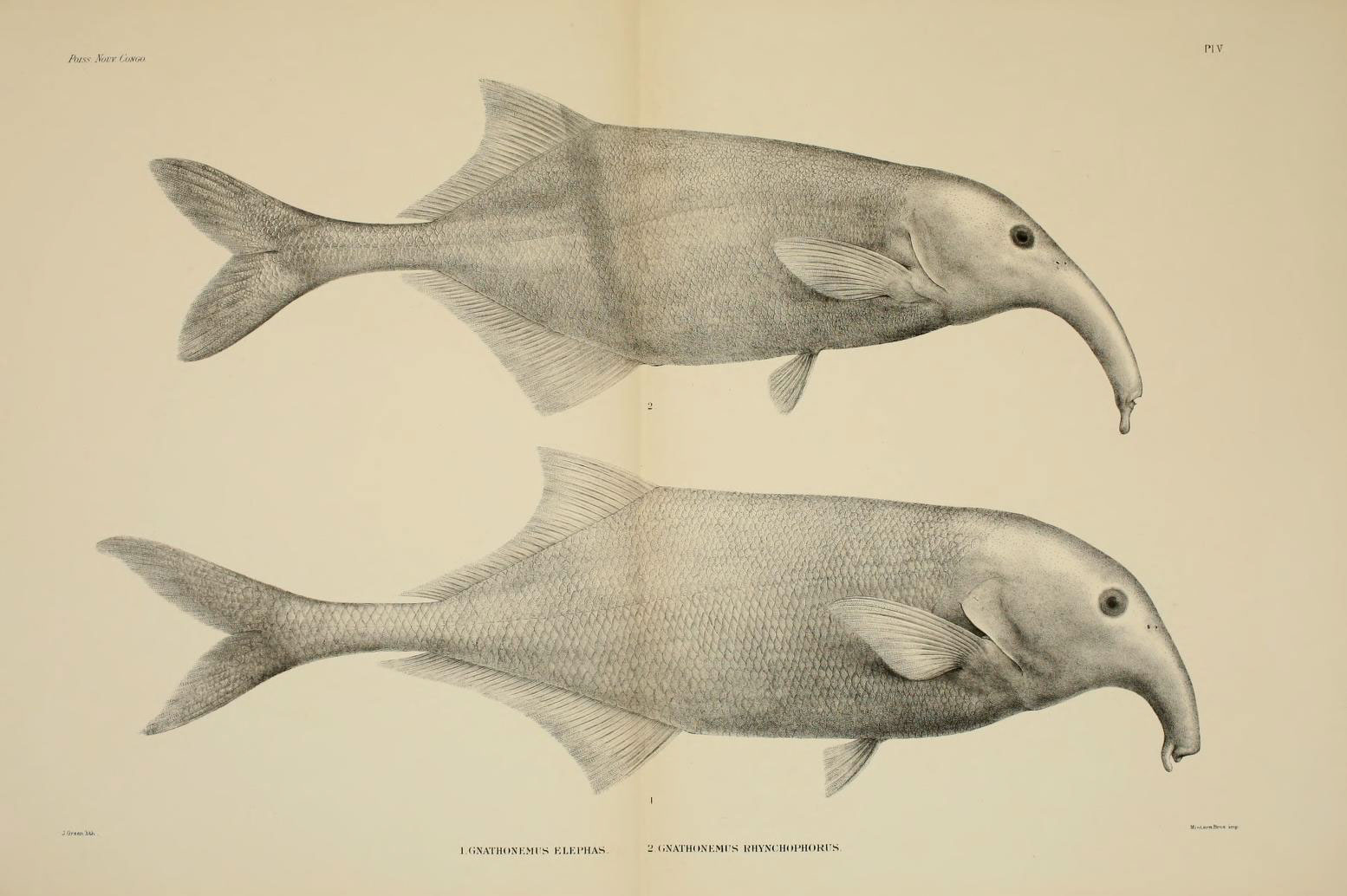
Pl. V Matériaux pour la faune du Congo.)

== Size ==
This species reaches a length of 22.0 cm (8.7 in).

== Distribution ==
This fish is distributed throughout the Congo River basin in the countries of Cameroon, the Democratic Republic of the Congo and Angola .
