= Campylomormyrus christyi =

Conservation status
- Least Concern (IUCN 3.1)

Scientific classification
- Kingdom: Animalia
- Phylum: Chordata
- Class: Actinopterygii
- Order: Osteoglossiformes
- Family: Mormyridae
- Genus: Campylomormyrus
- Species: C. christyi

Binomial name
- Campylomormyrus christyi (Boulenger 1920)

Synonyms
- Gnathonemus christyi Boulenger 1920

Species of fish

Campylomormyrus christyi is a species of electric fish in the family Mormyridae, is found in Africa: in the lower Congo, the Pool Malebo, Kasai and the Lukenie River in Democratic Republic of the Congo.

== Size ==
This species reaches a length of 37.5 cm (14.8 in).

== Etymology ==
The fish is named in honor of Cuthbert Christy (1863–1932), an English physician (specializing in sleeping sickness), a zoologist, an explorer, and the director of the Congo Museum in Tervuren, Belgium, who collected the holotype specimen.
