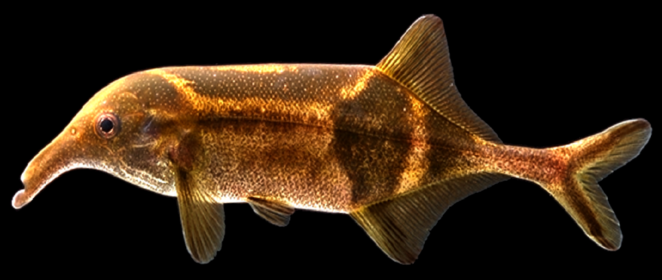
- Campylomormyrus tamandua

Conservation status
- Least Concern (IUCN 3.1)

Scientific classification
- Kingdom: Animalia
- Phylum: Chordata
- Class: Actinopterygii
- Order: Osteoglossiformes
- Family: Mormyridae
- Genus: Campylomormyrus
- Species: C. tamandua

Binomial name
- Campylomormyrus tamandua (Günther, 1862)

Synonyms
- Mormyrus tamandua Günther, 1864; Gnathonemus tamandua (Günther, 1864)

= Blunt-jawed elephantnose =

Species of fish

The blunt-jawed elephantnose or wormjawed mormyrid (Campylomormyrus tamandua) is a species of elephantfish. It is found in rivers in West and Middle Africa. It is brown or black with a long elephant-like snout with the mouth located near the tip. Its diet consists of worms, fish, and insects.

== Size ==
This species reaches a length of 43.0 cm (16.9 in).

== Etymology ==
The Latin name is derived from the anteater genus Tamandua, referring to the aardvark-like shape of its snout.

== See also ==
- List of freshwater aquarium fish species
