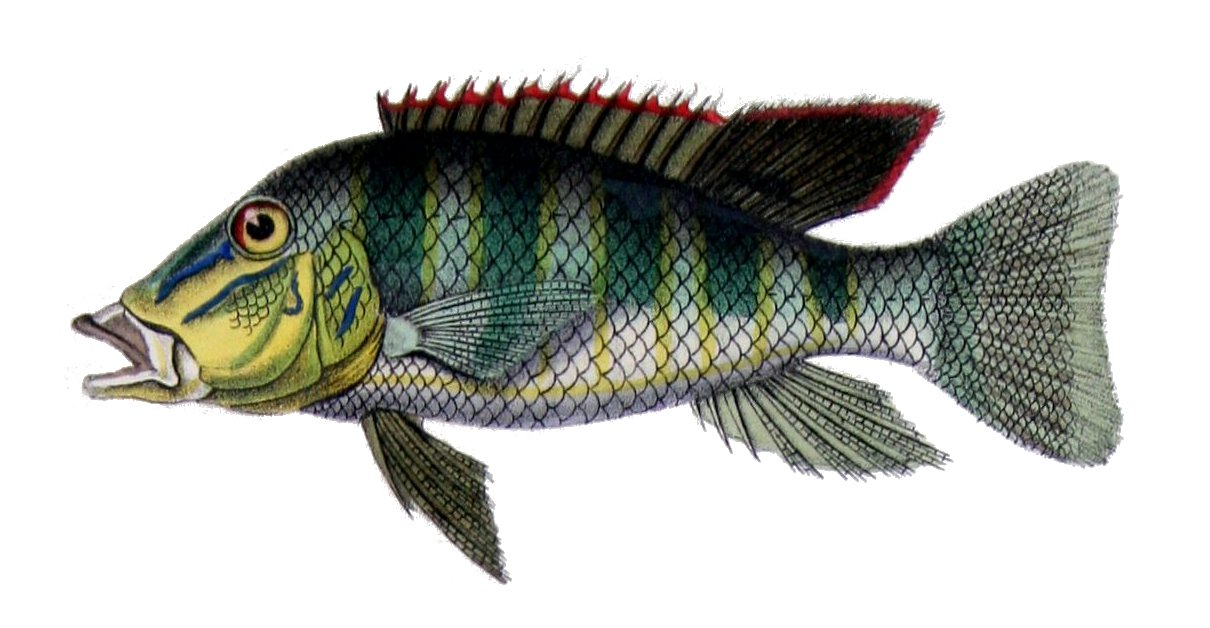

Scientific classification
- Kingdom: Animalia
- Phylum: Chordata
- Class: Actinopterygii
- Order: Cichliformes
- Family: Cichlidae
- Genus: Retroculus
- Species: R. lapidifer

Binomial name
- Retroculus lapidifer (Castelnau, 1855)

Synonyms
- Chromys lapidifera Castelnau, 1855; Acara lapidifera (Castelnau, 1855); Geophagus lapidifera (Castelnau, 1855); Retroculus lapidifera (Castelnau, 1855); Satanoperca lapidifera (Castelnau, 1855); Retroculus boulengeri C. H. Eigenmann & Bray, 1894

= Retroculus lapidifer =

Species of fish

Retroculus lapidifer is a species of cichlid native to tropical South America, where it is found in the rivers of the southeastern Amazon basin in Brazil. This fish was first described in 1855 by the French naturalist Francis de Laporte de Castelnau, who studied the fauna of South America while crossing the continent from Rio de Janeiro to Lima in an expedition starting in 1843 and lasting five years.

== Description ==
R. lapidifer can grow to a maximum length around 20 cm (8 in). It resembles a marine snapper (genus Lutjanus) in body shape and has five distinctive dark vertical bars on each side. The lips are large and underslung. The main body colour is an iridescent silvery-violet with random gold speckling. Small blue markings are on the face, two diagonal blue lines pass across the eyes, and an intermittent black spot appears on the soft part of the dorsal fin. Fish in this genus are characterised by a pointed snout, eyes set far back on the head, a depressed body with a compressed ventral region, and the ventral scales being smaller than those on the flanks.

== Distribution and habitat ==
The species is endemic to the southeastern Amazon basin in Brazil, where it is found in the Araguaia River and Tocantins River. It is typically found close to the bottom in rapids and fast-moving stretches of the river.

== Ecology ==
R. lapidifer forages on the river bed in fast-moving stretches of water, feeding on small invertebrates. Its diet varies with the time of year and the level of the river. When water levels are high, the main prey is chironomid midge larvae, but at lower water levels, caddisfly and mayfly larvae predominate. The fish has a large mouth and is more efficient at winnowing through the soft sediment than related species with smaller gapes. The swim bladder is reduced in size in this fish and it spends much of its time hopping around and perching on the riverbed, propped up by its pelvic fins, in the manner of a goby. During feeding, it repeatedly dives head first into the sediment with its mouth open wide, and then expels sand through its gill chambers.

In readiness for breeding, a pair of R. lapidifer forms a nest about 60 cm (24 in) across in a gravelly area of the river bed. Adult fish have been observed carrying small pebbles in their mouths to build the nest, hence the specific name lapidifer (bearer of stones). A clutch of about 200 eggs is laid and the nest is guarded by both parents. They also turn the eggs and move them about to ensure aeration, and the eggs hatch in five to six days.
