= Campylomormyrus compressirostris =

Scientific classification
- Domain: Eukaryota
- Kingdom: Animalia
- Phylum: Chordata
- Class: Actinopterygii
- Order: Osteoglossiformes
- Family: Mormyridae
- Genus: Campylomormyrus
- Species: C. compressirostris

Binomial name
- Campylomormyrus compressirostris (Pellegrin 1924)

Synonyms
- Gnathonemus compressirostris Pellegrin 1924

Species of fish

Campylomormyrus compressirostris is a species of electric fish in the family Mormyridae, found in Africa: in the marine lower Congo, lower Congo and the Pool Malebo in the Democratic Republic of the Congo.

== Size ==
This species reaches a length of 19.0 cm (7.5 in).
