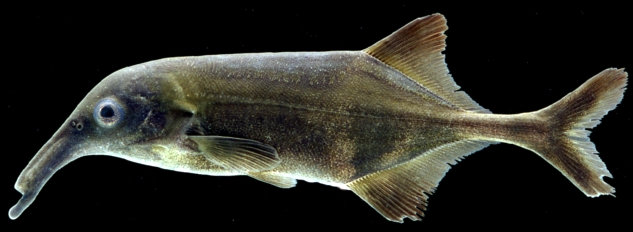

Conservation status
- Least Concern (IUCN 3.1)

Scientific classification
- Kingdom: Animalia
- Phylum: Chordata
- Class: Actinopterygii
- Order: Osteoglossiformes
- Family: Mormyridae
- Genus: Campylomormyrus
- Species: C. tshokwe

Binomial name
- Campylomormyrus tshokwe (Poll, 1967)

Synonyms
- Gnathonemus bredoi Poll, 1945

= Campylomormyrus tshokwe =

Species of fish

Campylomormyrus tshokwe is a species of elephantfish in the family Mormyridae, found in African Kwango and Luachimo rivers in the Democratic Republic of the Congo and Angola.

== Size ==
This species reaches a length of 29.5 cm (11.6 in).
