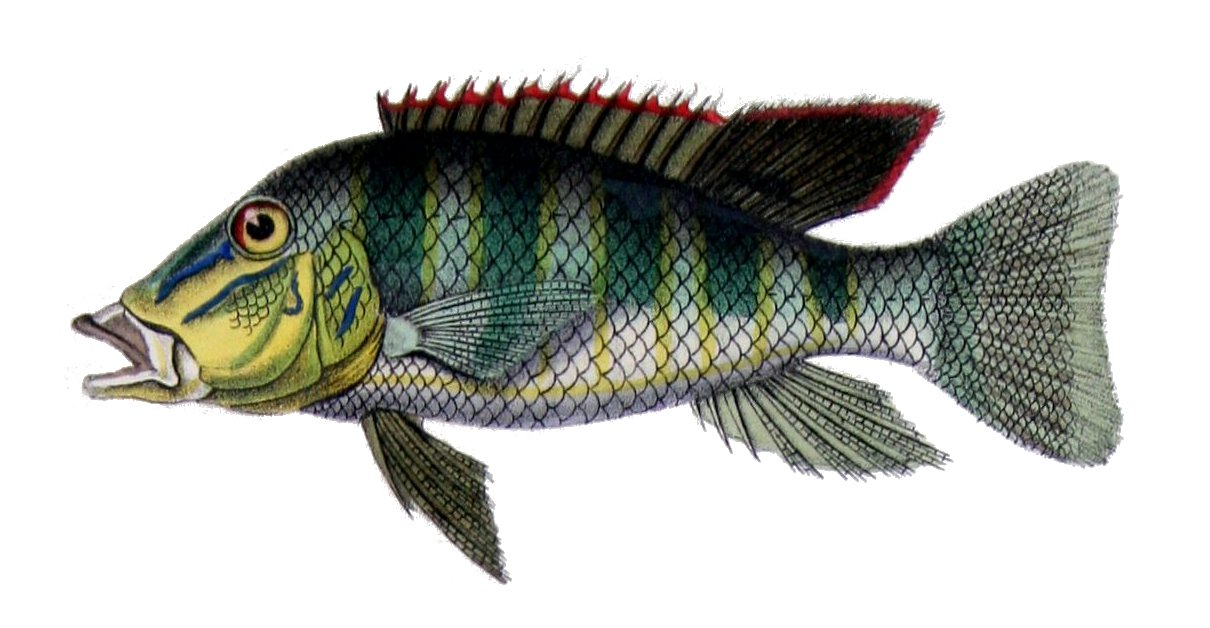
- Retroculus lapidifer

Scientific classification
- Domain: Eukaryota
- Kingdom: Animalia
- Phylum: Chordata
- Class: Actinopterygii
- Order: Cichliformes
- Family: Cichlidae
- Subfamily: Cichlinae
- Tribe: Retroculini; Kullander, 1998
- Genus: Retroculus; C. H. Eigenmann & W. L. Bray, 1894

Type species
- Retroculus boulengeri Eigenmann & Bray, 1894

= Retroculus =

Genus of fishes

Retroculus is a genus of cichlids native to tropical South America, where three are native to rivers in southeastern Amazon Basin in Brazil, while the final is native to rivers in Amapá (Brazil) and French Guiana. It is the sole genus included in the subfamily Retroculinae, although some authorities classify this as a tribe, Retroculini, of the subfamily Cichlinae. These rheophilic cichlids are superficially similar to Geophagus.

== Species ==
Four recognized species are in this genus:

- Retroculus acherontos Landim, C. L. R. Moreira & C. A. Figueiredo, 2015
- Retroculus lapidifer (Castelnau, 1855)
- Retroculus septentrionalis J. P. Gosse, 1971
- Retroculus xinguensis J. P. Gosse, 1971
