= Campylomormyrus luapulaensis =

Conservation status
- Data Deficient (IUCN 3.1)

Scientific classification
- Kingdom: Animalia
- Phylum: Chordata
- Class: Actinopterygii
- Order: Osteoglossiformes
- Family: Mormyridae
- Genus: Campylomormyrus
- Species: C. luapulaensis

Binomial name
- Campylomormyrus luapulaensis (L. R. David & Poll 1937)

Synonyms
- Gnathonemus luapulaensis L. R. David & Poll 1937

Species of fish

Campylomormyrus luapulaensis is a species of electric fish in the family Mormyridae, found in Africa: in the Luapula River of the upper Congo River basin in Democratic Republic of the Congo and Zambia.

== Size ==
This species reaches a length of 22.0 cm (8.7 in).

== Etymology ==
The fish is named in honor of the upper Luapula River, Congo River basin, Zaire now Democratic Republic of the Congo.
