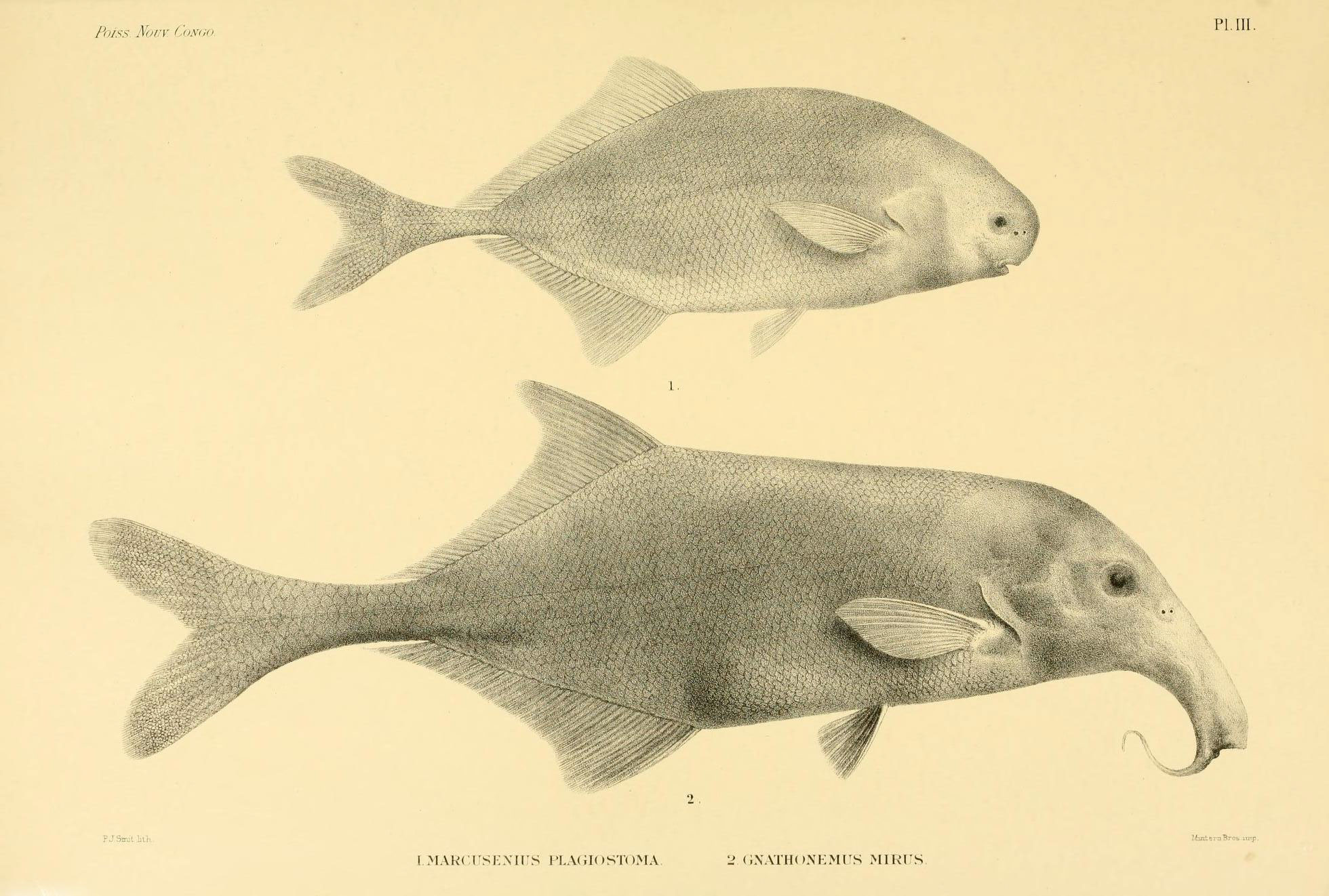
- Fig 2 Gnathonemus mirus now known as Campylomormyrus mirus.

Conservation status
- Least Concern (IUCN 3.1)

Scientific classification
- Kingdom: Animalia
- Phylum: Chordata
- Class: Actinopterygii
- Order: Osteoglossiformes
- Family: Mormyridae
- Genus: Campylomormyrus
- Species: C. mirus

Binomial name
- Campylomormyrus mirus (Boulenger 1898)

Synonyms
- Gnathonemus mirus Boulenger 1898

= Campylomormyrus mirus =

Species of fish

Campylomormyrus mirus is a species of electric fish in the family Mormyridae, found in Africa: along the middle Congo River main course, Uélé, Aruwimi, Lindi-Tshopo and Wagenia Falls in Democratic Republic of the Congo.

== Size ==
This species reaches a length of 47.0 cm (18.5 in).
