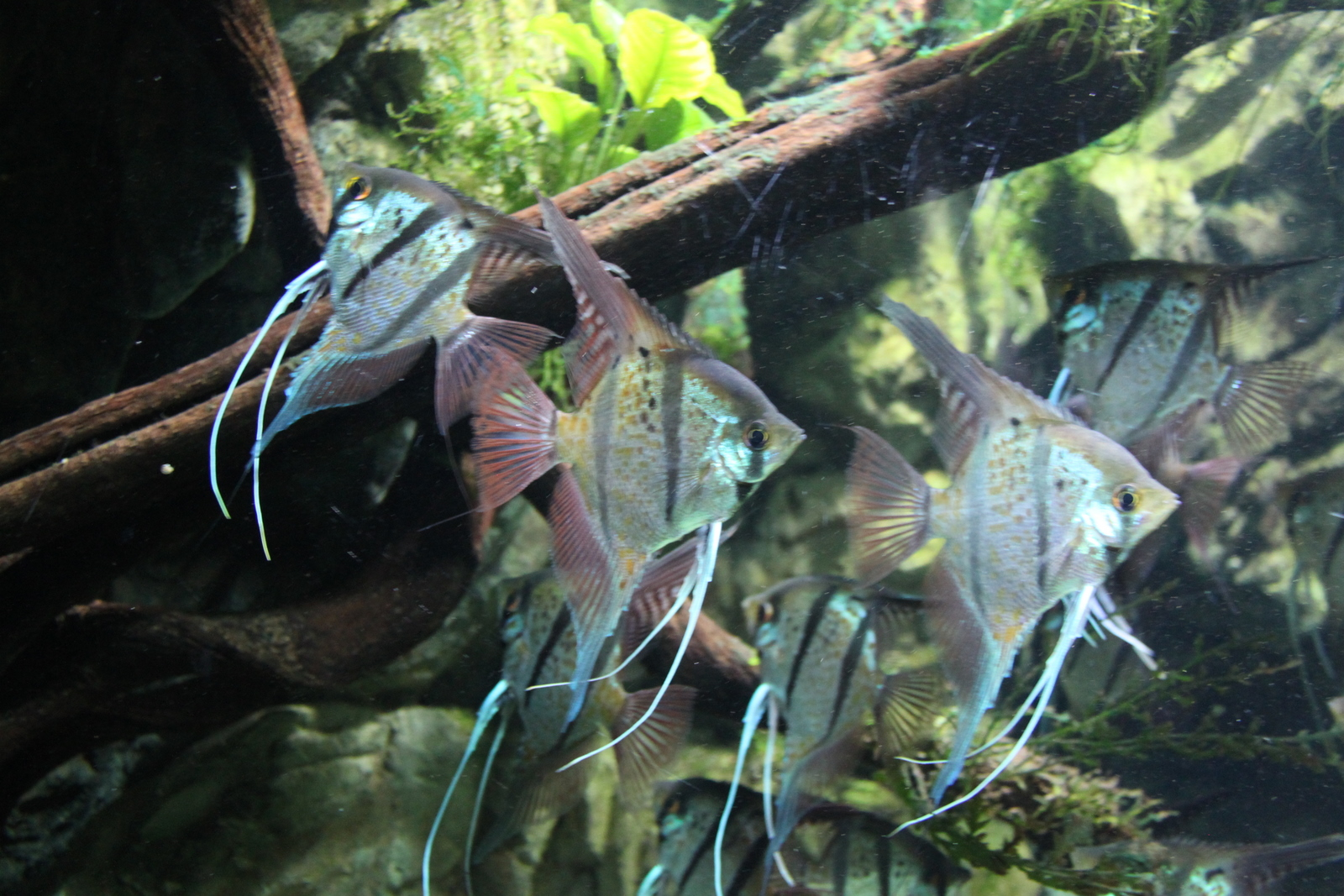

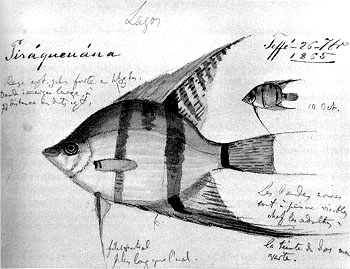

Scientific classification
- Kingdom: Animalia
- Phylum: Chordata
- Class: Actinopterygii
- Division: Teleostei
- Order: Cichliformes
- Family: Cichlidae
- Tribe: Heroini
- Genus: Pterophyllum; Heckel, 1840

Type species
- Platax scalaris G. Cuvier, 1831
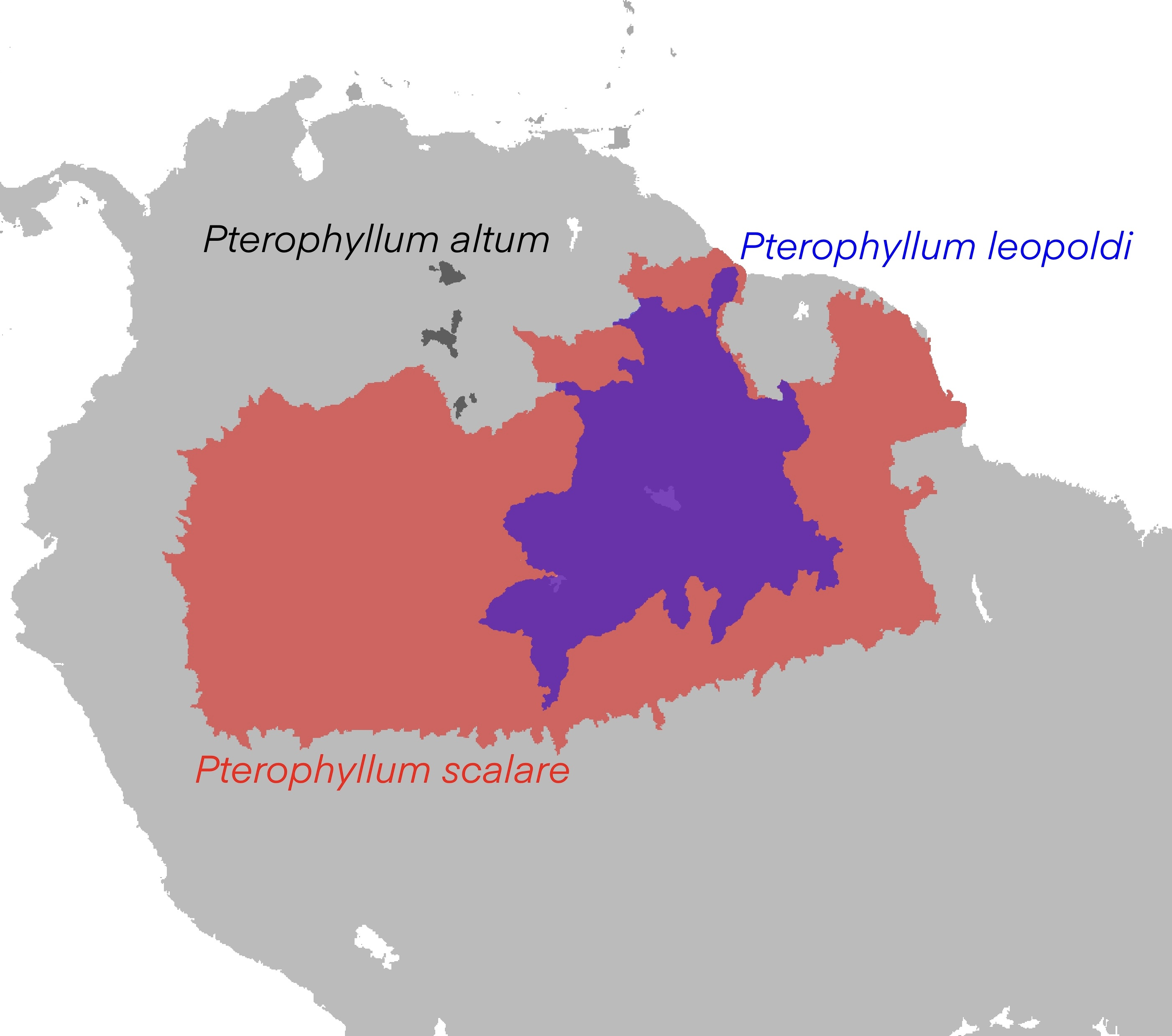

= Pterophyllum =

Freshwater angelfish

Genus of fish

Pterophyllum is a small genus of freshwater fish from the family Cichlidae known to most aquarists as angelfish. All Pterophyllum species originate in the Amazon Basin, Orinoco Basin and various rivers in the Guiana Shield in tropical South America. The three species of Pterophyllum are unusually shaped for cichlids, being greatly laterally compressed, with round bodies and elongated triangular dorsal and anal fins. This body shape allows them to hide among roots and plants, often on a vertical surface. Naturally occurring angelfish are frequently striped transversely, colouration which provides additional camouflage. Angelfish are ambush predators and prey on small fish and macroinvertebrates. All Pterophyllum species form monogamous pairs. Eggs are generally laid on a submerged log or a flattened leaf but can also be laid on filter piping when kept in an aquarium setting. As is the case for other cichlids, brood care is highly developed.

Pterophyllum should not be confused with marine angelfish, perciform fish found on shallow ocean reefs.

== Species ==
The currently recognized species in this genus are:

Image	Scientific name	Distribution
	Pterophyllum altum Pellegrin, 1903	Orinoco River Basin and the Upper Rio Negro watershed in Southern Venezuela, Southeastern Colombia and extreme Northern Brazil
	Pterophyllum leopoldi (J. P. Gosse, 1963)	Amazon River (between Manacapuru and Santarém), Essequibo River and Rupununi River.
	Pterophyllum scalare (Schultze, 1823) (freshwater angelfish)	Amazon Basin in Peru, Colombia, and Brazil

== History ==
The freshwater angelfish (P. scalare) was described in 1824 by F. Schultze. Pterophyllum is derived from the Greek πτερον, pteron (fin/sail) and φυλλον, phyllon (leaf).

In 1906, J. Pellegrin described P. altum. In 1963, P. leopoldi was described by J. P. Gosse. Undescribed species may still exist in the Amazon Basin. New species of fish are discovered with increasing frequency, and, like P. scalare and P. leopoldi, the differences may be subtle. Scientific notations describe the P. leopoldi as having 29–35 scales in a lateral row and straight predorsal contour, whereas, P. scalare is described as having 35–45 scales in a lateral row and a notched predorsal contour. P. leopoldi shows the same coloration as P. scalare, but a faint stripe shows between the eye stripe and the first complete body stripe and a third incomplete body stripe exists between the two main (complete) body stripes that extends three-fourths the length of the body. P. scalare's body does not show the stripe between the eye stripe and first complete body stripe at all, and the third stripe between the two main body stripes rarely extends downward more than a half inch, if even present. P. leopoldi fry develop three to eight body stripes, with all but one to five fading away as they mature, whereas P. scalare only has two in true wild form throughout life.

Angelfish were bred in captivity for at least 30 years prior to P. leopoldi being described.

== In the aquarium ==
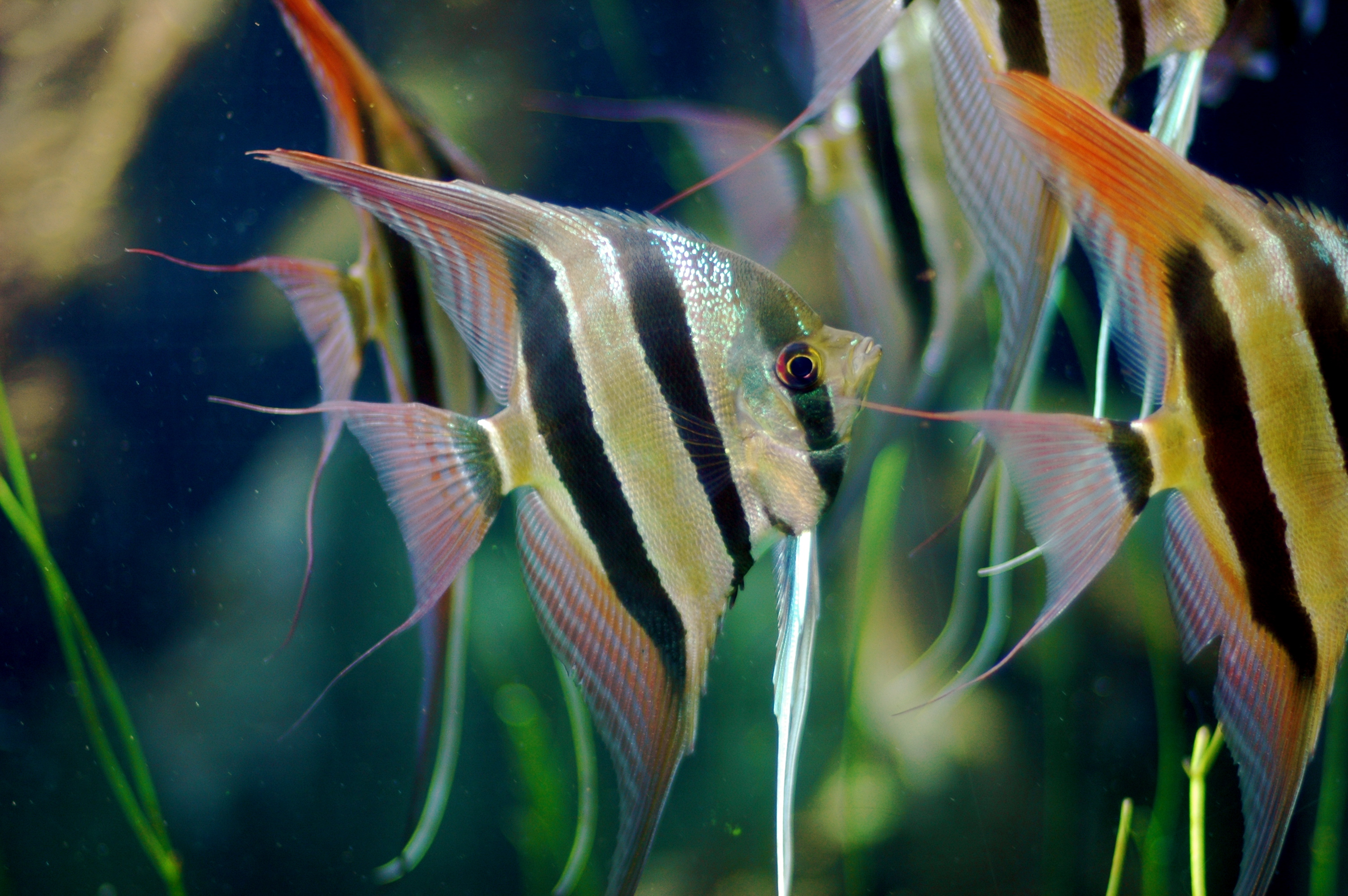
A group of Pterophyllum altum

Angelfish are one of the most commonly kept freshwater aquarium fish, as well as the most commonly kept cichlid. They are praised for their unique shape, color, and behavior. It was not until the late 1920s to early 1930s that the angelfish was bred in captivity in the United States.

=== Species ===
The most commonly kept species in the aquarium is Pterophyllum scalare. Most of the individuals in the aquarium trade are captive-bred. Sometimes, captive-bred Pterophyllum altum is available. Pterophyllum leopoldi is the hardest to find in the trade.

=== Care ===
Angelfish are kept in a warm aquarium, ideally around 80 °F (27 °C), with soft and acidic (<6.5pH) water. Though angelfish are members of the cichlid family, they are generally peaceful when not mating; however, they still may feed on very small species of fishes. Suitable tank mates include catfishes of the families Doradidae and Callichthyidae which have their own armor for protection.

=== Breeding ===
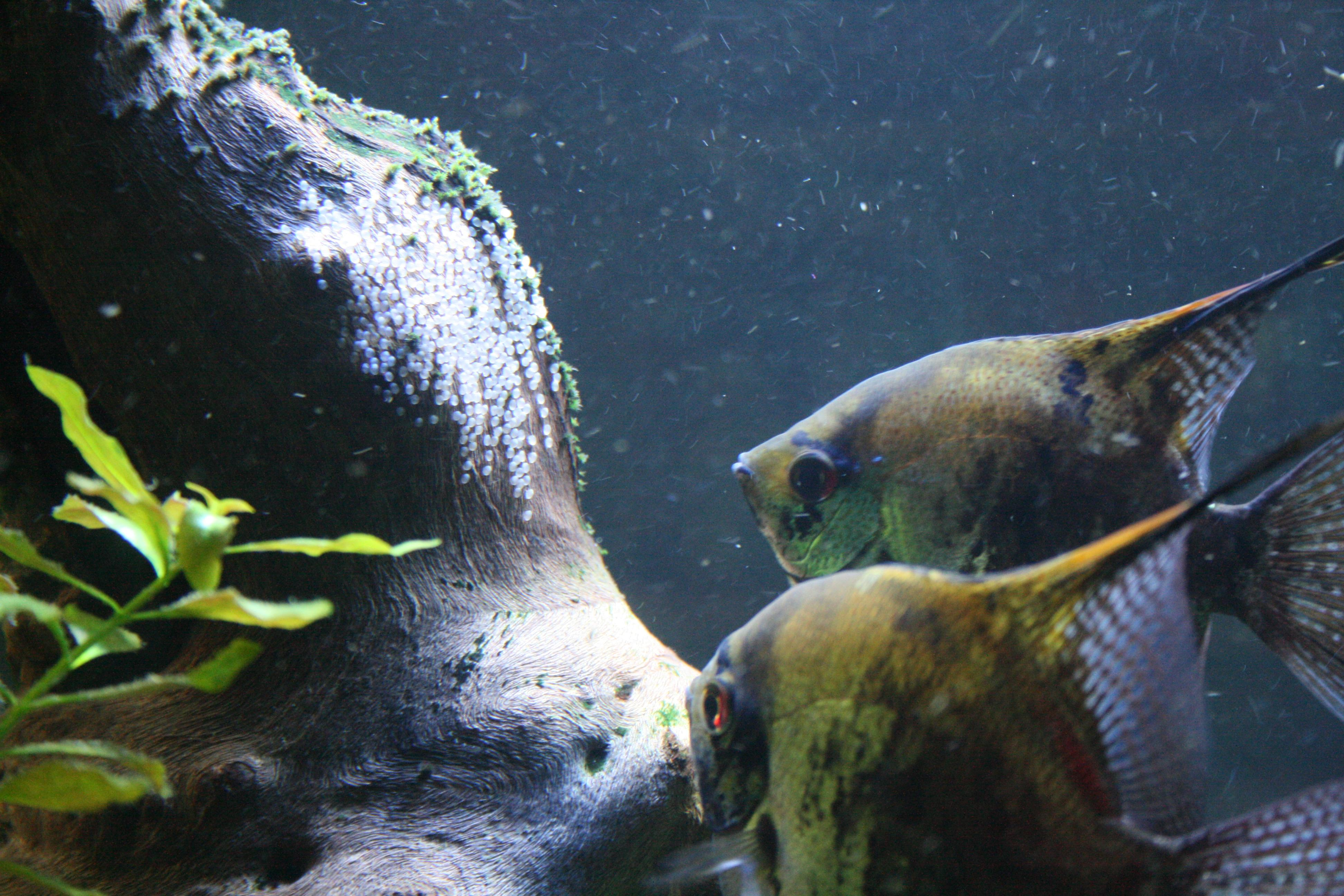
A Pterophyllum couple spawning

P. scalare is relatively easy to breed in the aquarium, although one of the results of generations of inbreeding is that many breeds have almost completely lost their rearing instincts, resulting in the tendency of the parents to eat their young. In addition, it is very difficult to accurately identify the sex of any individual until it is nearly ready to breed.

Angelfish pairs form long-term relationships where each individual will protect the other from threats and potential suitors. Upon the death or removal of one of the mated pair, breeders have experienced the total refusal of the remaining mate to pair up with any other angelfish and successfully breed with subsequent mates.

Depending upon aquarium conditions, P. scalare reaches sexual maturity at the age of six to 12 months or more. In situations where the eggs are removed from the aquarium immediately after spawning, the pair is capable of spawning every seven to 10 days. Around the age of three years, spawning frequency decreases and eventually ceases.

When the pair is ready to spawn, they choose an appropriate medium upon which to lay the eggs, and spend one or two days picking off detritus and algae from the surface. This medium may be a broad-leaf plant in the aquarium, a flat surface such as a piece of slate placed vertically in the aquarium, a length of pipe, or even the glass sides of the aquarium. The female deposits a line of eggs on the spawning substrate, followed by the male, which fertilizes the eggs. This process is repeated until a total of 100 to more than 1,200 eggs are laid, depending on the size and health of the female fish. As both parents care for the offspring throughout development, the pair takes turns maintaining a high rate of water circulation around the eggs by swimming very close to the eggs and fanning them with their pectoral fins. In a few days, the eggs hatch and the fry remain attached to the spawning substrate. During this period, the fry survive by consuming the remnants of their yolk sacs. At one week, the fry detach and become free-swimming. Successful parents keep close watch on the eggs until then. At the free-swimming stage, the fry can be fed suitably sized live food.

P. altum is notably difficult to breed in an aquarium environment.

=== Lifespan ===
Freshwater Angelfish with quality genetics are known to live approximately 12 years in captivity, if the ideal living conditions are provided. In the wild they are thought to live as long as 15 years if unthreatened by their numerous natural predators.

=== Compatibility with other fish ===
In pet stores, the freshwater angelfish is typically placed in the semiaggressive category. Some tetras and barbs are compatible with angelfish, but ones small enough to fit in the mouth of the angelfish may be eaten. Generous portions of food should be available so the angelfish do not get hungry and turn on their tank mates.

P. scalare and P. altum are described to be peaceful but territorial. While freshwater angelfish are often recommended for community aquaria, it has been reported that fin-nippers, such as tiger barbs, often target their long fins, and that freshwater angelfish become aggressive towards their companions as they grow. It is thus recommended that freshwater angelfish be kept instead in single-species aquaria.

=== Common angelfish diseases ===
==== Ich (white spot disease) ====
Ich, also known as "white spot disease," is caused by the parasitic protozoan Ichthyophthirius multifiliis. Fish infected with Ich exhibit small, white, grain-like spots on their body, fins, and gills. These spots are cysts where the parasites reside. Infected fish often display signs of discomfort, frequently scratching against objects in the aquarium. The primary cause of an Ich outbreak is usually stress, which can result from factors such as poor water quality, sudden temperature changes, or the introduction of new fish without proper quarantine. To treat Ich, increasing the aquarium's temperature gradually to 78–86 °F (26–30 °C) for a few days can speed up the parasite's life cycle. Simultaneously, using commercially available Ich treatments, based on copper or formalin, can be effective in eradicating the disease.

==== Fin rot ====
Fin rot is a common bacterial infection affecting the fins of aquarium fish. It is characterized by the fraying, discoloration, and gradual degradation of the fish's fins, giving them a ragged appearance. If left untreated, the condition can progress from the fins to the body, leading to a more severe form known as body rot. The primary causes of fin rot are poor water quality, overcrowding, and physical damage, all of which stress the fish and make them more susceptible to infections. In terms of treatment, the first step is to improve water quality by conducting regular water changes, removing waste, and ensuring proper filtration.

==== Swim bladder disease ====
Swim bladder disease refers to a collection of issues affecting a fish's swim bladder, the organ responsible for buoyancy. Fish afflicted with this condition may struggle to maintain their position in the water, often floating upside-down, sinking to the bottom, or swimming at unusual angles. The causes can be diverse, ranging from overfeeding, constipation, and rapid water temperature changes to physical injury and bacterial infections. To treat swim bladder disease, it's advised to first fast the fish for 24–48 hours, followed by feeding them a diet of cooked, skinned peas, which can help alleviate constipation. If the condition is thought to be due to a bacterial infection, antibiotic treatments can be considered.

==== Bacterial infections ====
Bacterial infections in aquarium fish can manifest in various ways and are caused by harmful bacteria proliferating within the tank. Symptoms can range from visible ulcers, sores, and red streaks on the fish's body to bloating, erratic swimming, and a loss of appetite. The primary triggers for bacterial infections often include poor water quality, overcrowded tanks, stress, and injuries. Overfeeding, which leads to excess waste, can also contribute to bacterial blooms. To treat bacterial infections, the first step is always to improve water conditions by conducting regular water changes, enhancing filtration, and removing any decaying organic matter. Specialized antibacterial medications, available at pet and aquarium stores, can be administered based on the specific type of bacterial infection. In severe or persistent cases, isolating the affected fish in a quarantine tank during treatment is recommended.

== Aquarium varieties ==
Most strains of angelfish available in the fishkeeping hobby are the result of many decades of selective breeding. For the most part, the original crosses of wild angelfish were not recorded, and confusion between the various species of Pterophyllum, especially P. scalare and P. leopoldi, is common. This makes the origins of "domestic angelfish" unclear. Domestic strains are most likely a collection of genes resulting from more than one species of wild angelfish, combined with the selection of mutations in domesticated lines over the last 60 or more years. The result of this is a domestic angelfish that is a true hybrid, with little more than a superficial resemblance to wild Pterophyllum species. Much of the research into the known genetics of P. scalare is the result of the research of Dr. Joanne Norton, who published a series of 18 articles in Freshwater and Marine Aquarium Magazine. The genome of P. scalare was first sequenced and assembled by Indeever Madireddy, a high school student in October 2022.

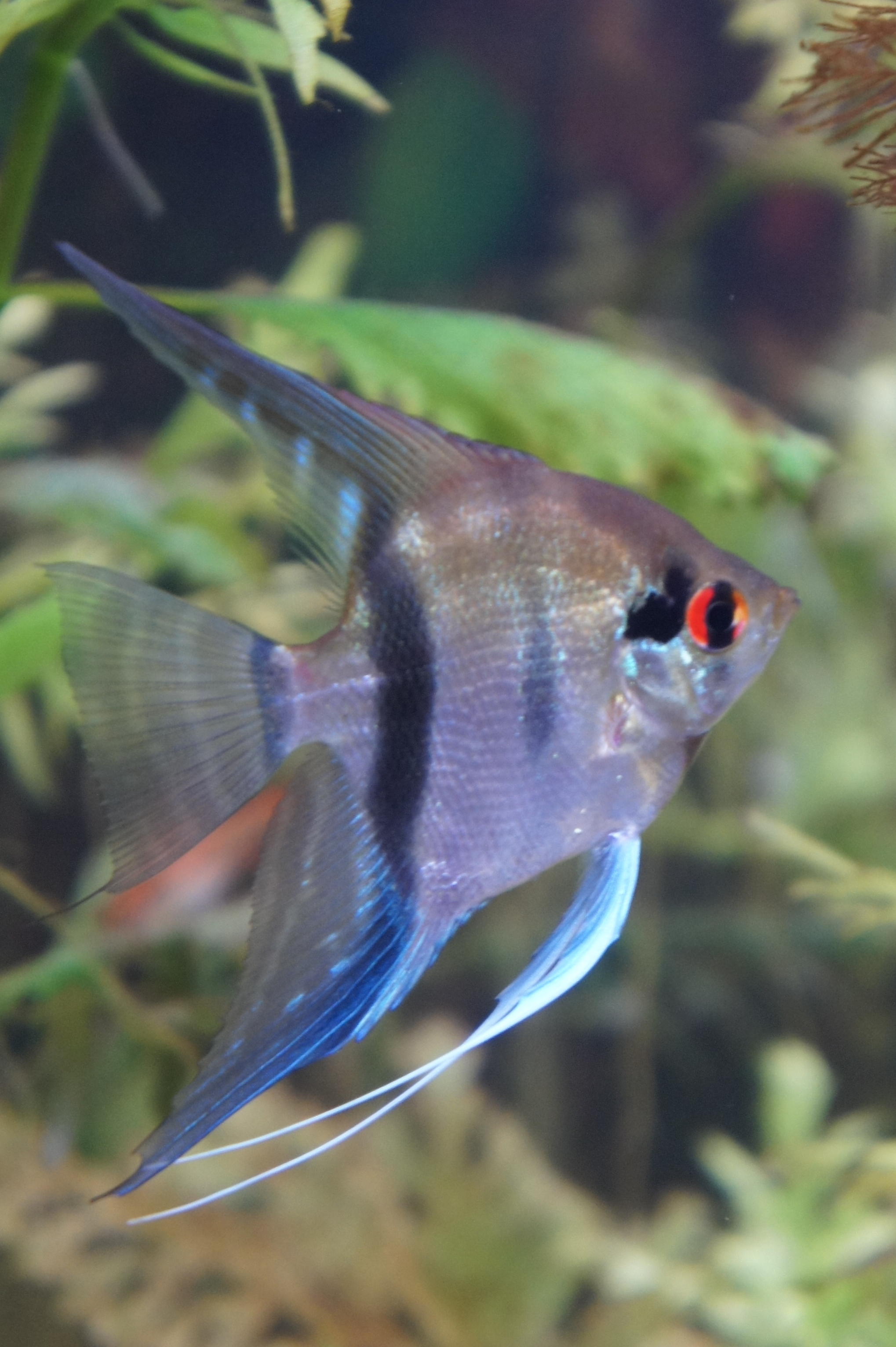
An adolescent silver angelfish

- Silver (+/+): The silver angelfish most commonly resembles the wild form of angelfish, and is also referred to as "wild-type". It is not, however, caught in the wild and is considered domestic. The fish has a silver body with red eyes, and three vertical black stripes that can fade or darken depending on the mood of the fish.
- Gold (g/g): The genetic trait for the gold angelfish is recessive, and causes a light golden body with a darker yellow or orange color on the crown of the fish. It does not have the vertical black stripes or the red eye seen in the wild angelfish.
- Zebra (Z/+ or Z/Z): The zebra phenotype results in four to six vertical stripes on the fish that in other ways resembles a silver angelfish. It is a dominant mutation that exists at the same locus as the stripeless gene.
- Black lace (D/+) or zebra lace (D/+ - Z/+): A silver or zebra with one copy of the dark gene results in very attractive lacing in the fins, considered by some to the most attractive of all angelfish varieties.
- Smokey (Sm/+): A variety with a dark brownish grey back half and dark dorsal and anal fins
- Chocolate (Sm/Sm): Homozygous for smokey with more of the dark pattern, sometimes only the head is silver

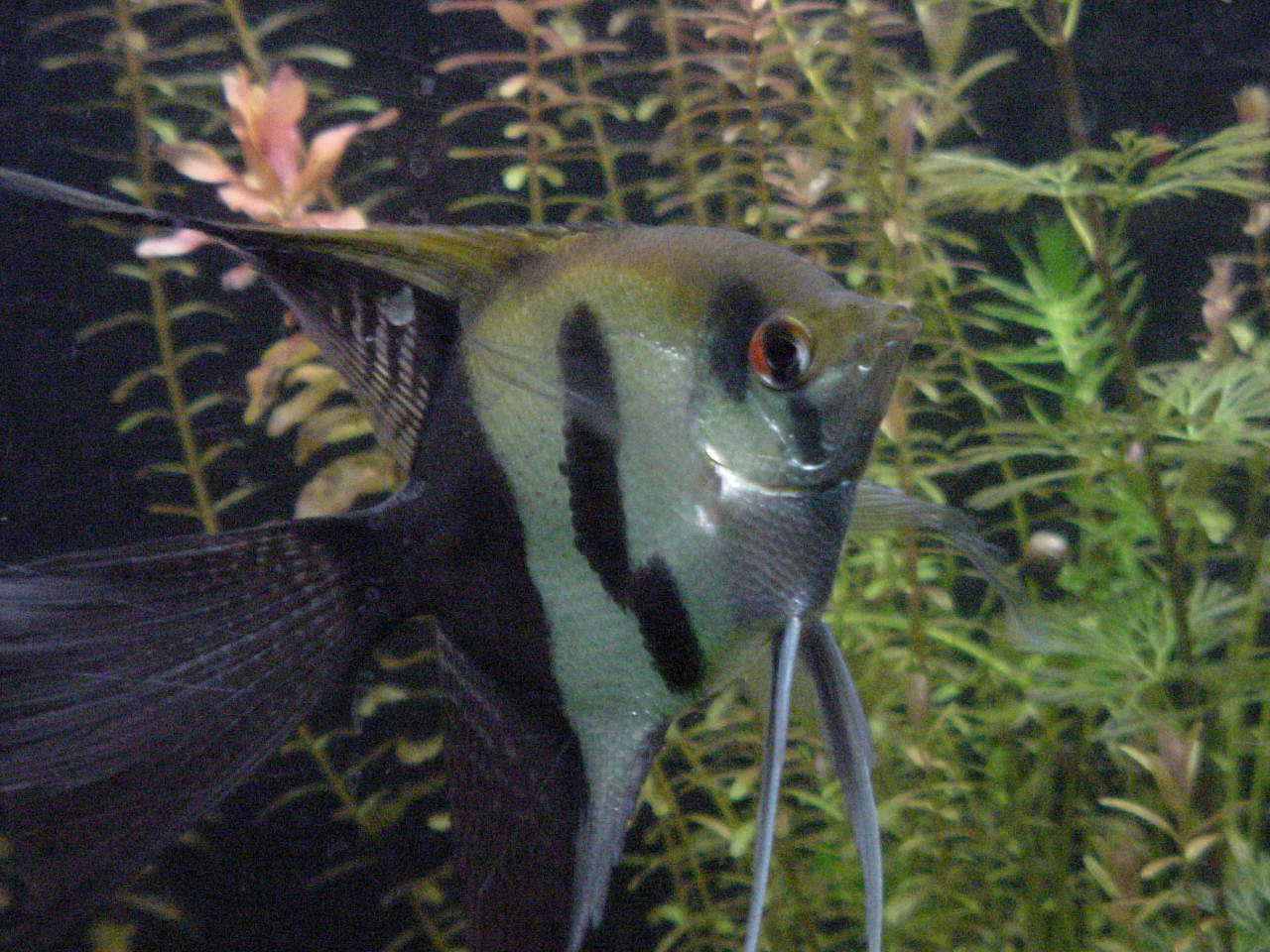
Halfblack veil angelfish - P. scalare

- Halfblack (h/h): Silver with a black rear portion, halfblack can express along with some other color genes, but not all. The pattern may not develop or express if the fish are in stressful conditions.

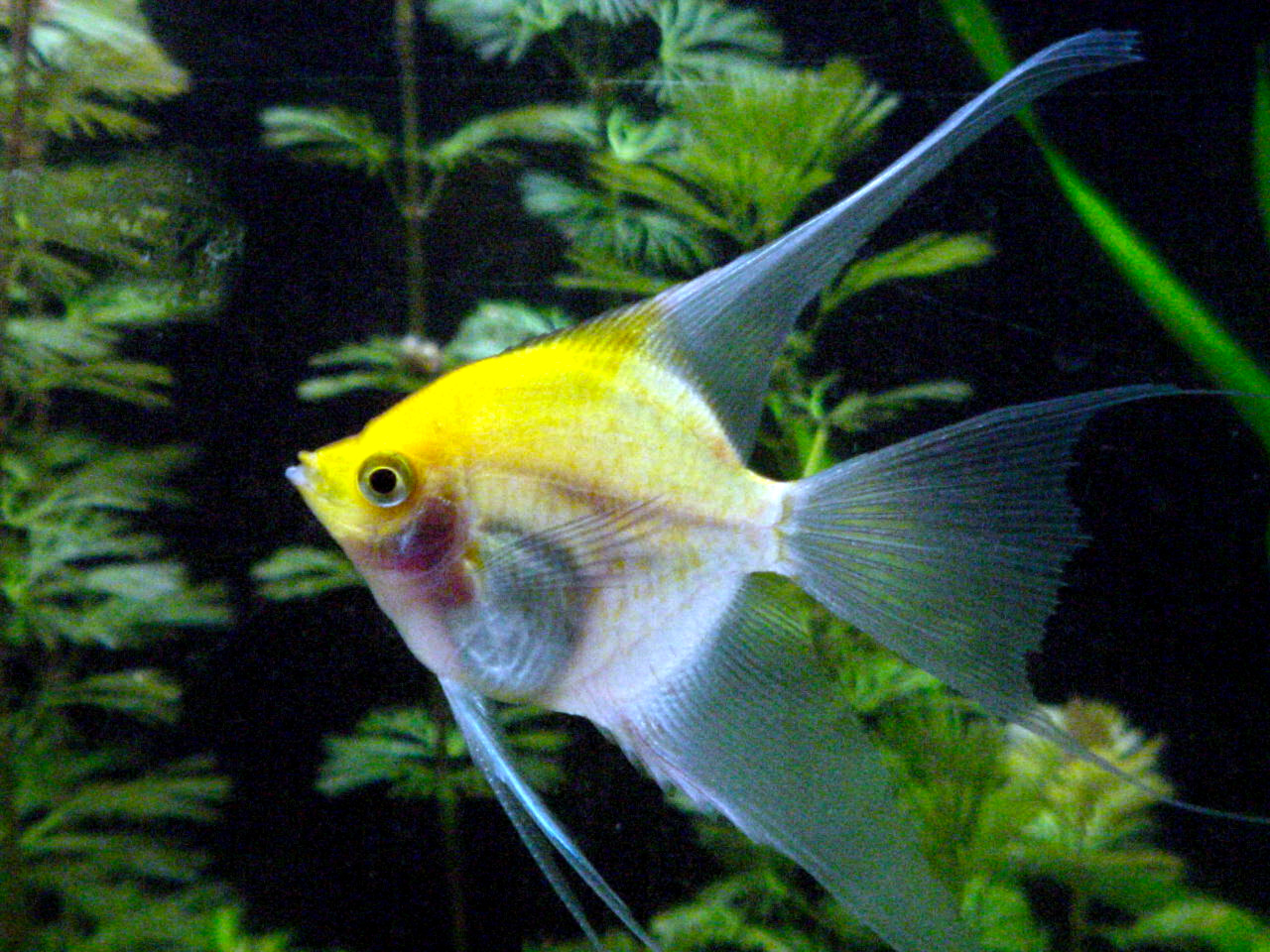
Sunset blushing veil angelfish - P. scalare

- Sunset blushing (g/g S/S): The sunset blushing has two genes of gold and two genes of stripeless. The upper half of the fish exhibits orange on the best specimens. The body is mostly white in color, and the fins are clear. The amount of orange showing on the fish can vary. On some, the body is a pinkish or tangerine color. The term blushing comes from the clear gill plates found on juveniles, with pinkish gills underneath.

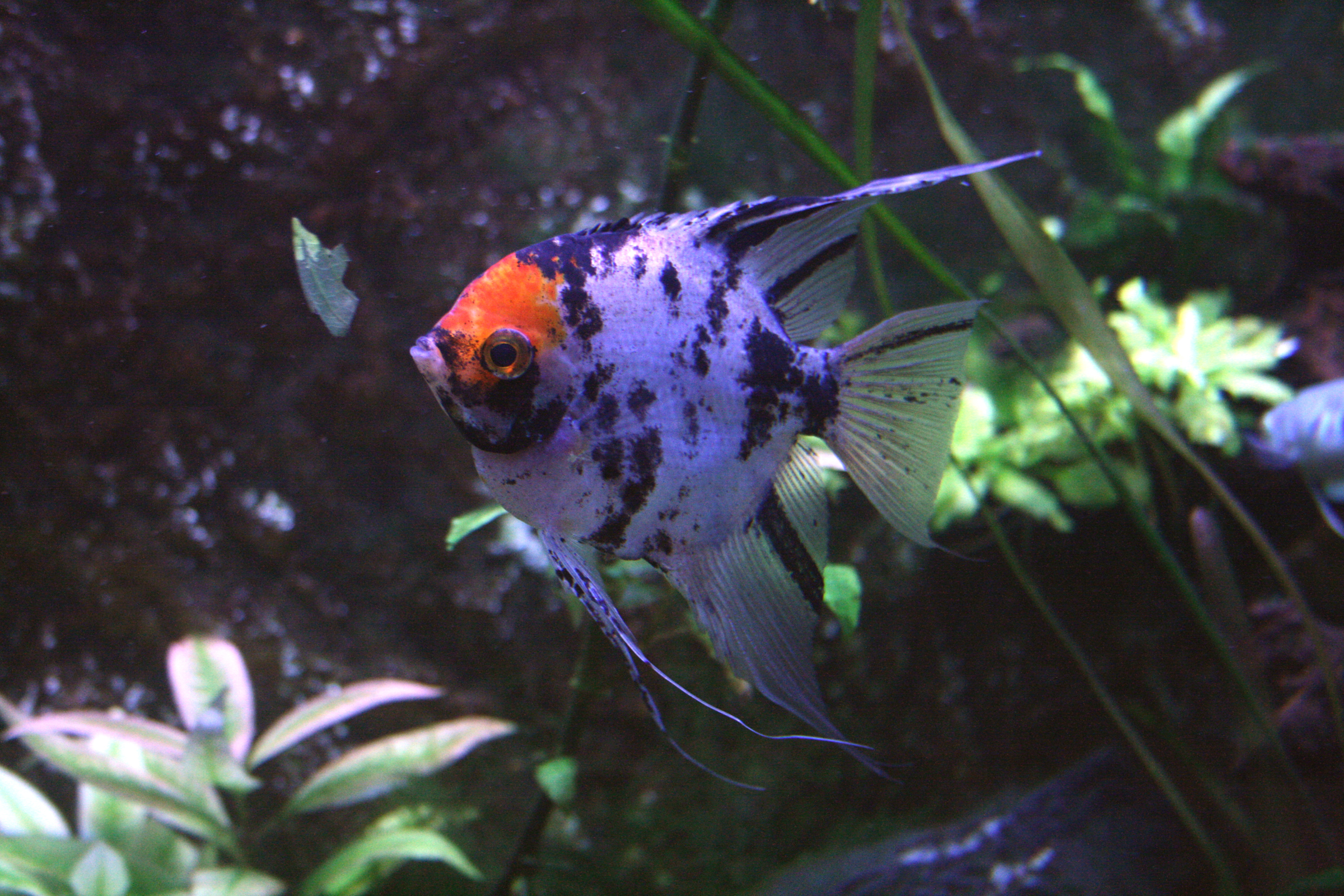
Koi angelfish - P. scalare

- Koi (Gm/Gm S/S) or (Gm/g S/S): The koi has a double or single gene of gold marble with a double gene of stripeless. Their expression of orange varies with stress levels. The black marbling varies from 5%-40% coverage.
- Leopard (Sm/Sm Z/Z) or (Sm/Sm Z/+): Leopards are very popular fish when young, having spots over most of their bodies. Most of these spots grow closer together as adults, so they look like chocolates with dots.
- Blue blushing (S/S): This wild-type angelfish has two stripeless genes. The body is actually grey with a bluish tint under the right light spectrum. An iridescent pigment develops as they age. This iridescence usually appears blue under most lighting.
- Silver gold marble (Gm/+): A silver angel with a single gold marble gene, this is a co-dominant expression.
- Ghost (S/+): Heterozygous for stripeless results in a mostly silver fish with just a stripe through the eye and tail. Sometimes, portions of the body stripes will express.
- Gold marble (Gm/g or Gm/Gm): Depending on whether the Gold Marble is single or double dose, the marbling will range from 5% to 40% coverage.

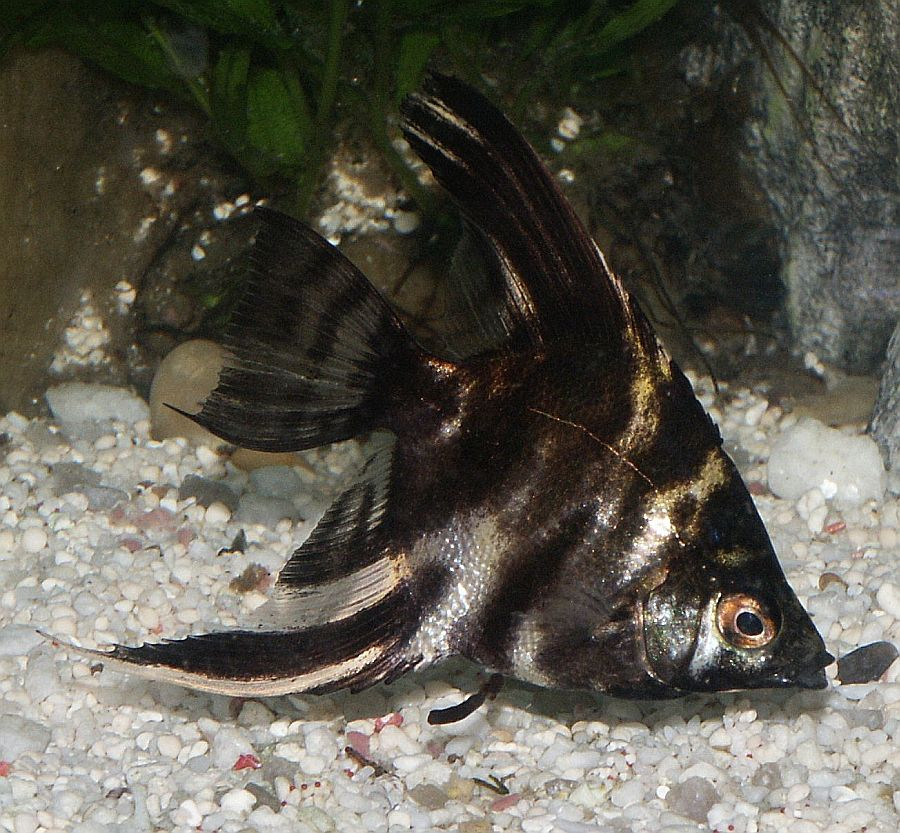
Marble angelfish - P. scalare

- Marble (M/+ or M/M or M/g or M/Gm): Marble expresses with much more black pattern than gold marble. The marbling varies from 50% to 95%.
- Black hybrid (D/g or D/Gm): A cross of black with a gold, the result is black hybrids, a very vigorous black that may look brassy when young. This cross does not breed true.

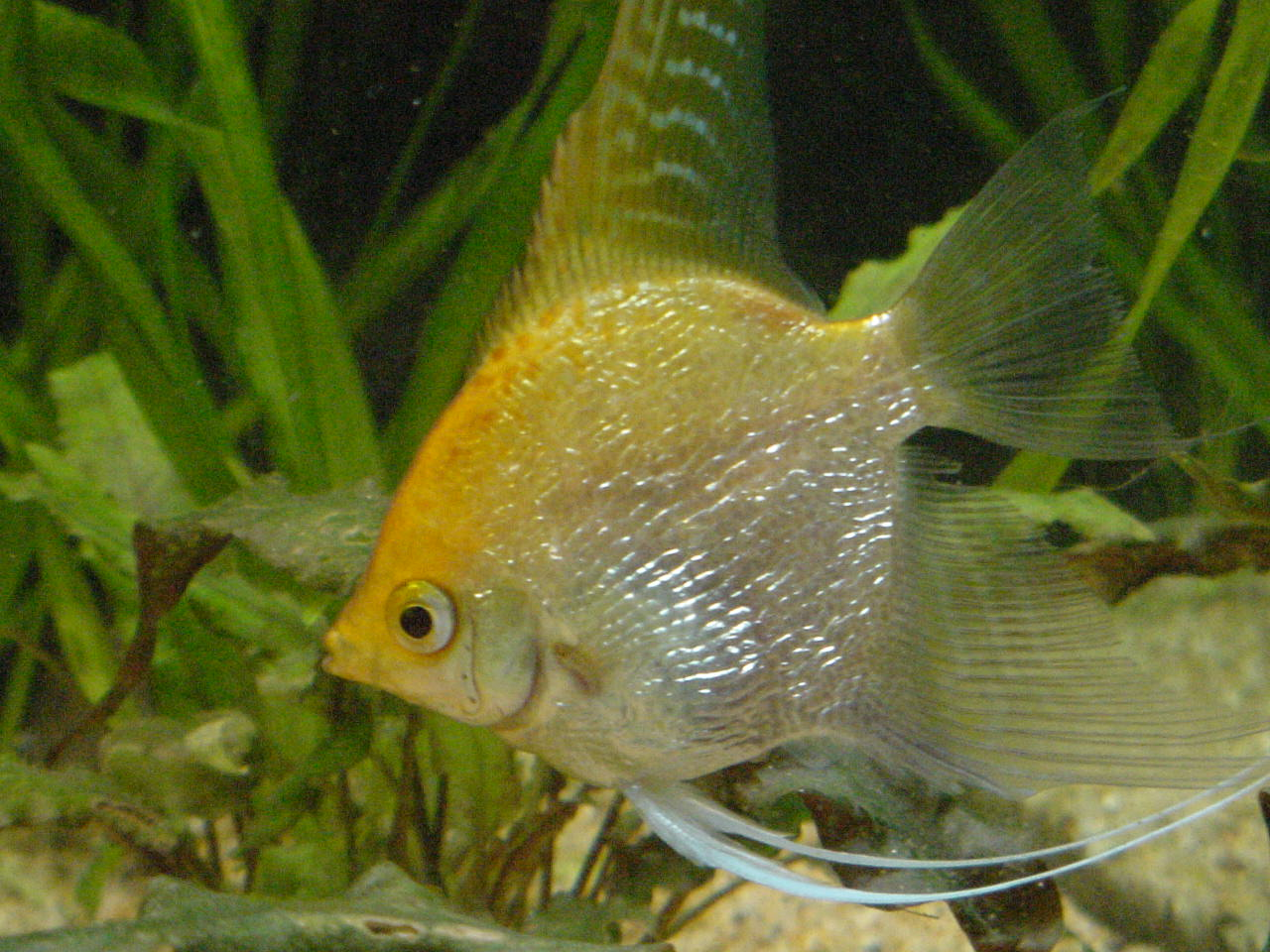
Gold pearlscale angelfish - P. scalare

- Pearlscale (p/p): Pearlscale is a scale mutation, also called the "diamond" angelfish in some regions due to the gem-like iridescence on its scales. The scales have a wrinkled, wavy look that reflects light to create a sparkling effect. Pearl develops slowly, starting at around 9 weeks of age. In can be inhibited by stressful conditions. It is recessive, requiring both parents to contribute the allele.
- Black ghost (D/+ - S/+): Similar to a ghost, it has a darker appearance due to the dark gene, and very similar to a black lace without complete stripes. Ghosts generally have more iridescence than normal.
- Albino (a/a): Albino removes dark pigments in most varieties. Some, like albino marble, still have a little black remaining on a percentage of the fish. The eye pupils are pink as in all albino animals. The surrounding iris can be red or yellow depending on the variety.
