= Jean-Pierre Gosse =

Belgian biologist and ichthyologist

Jean-Pierre Gosse (May 14, 1924 – June 6, 2001) was a Belgian biologist and ichthyologist.

== Life and career ==
Gosse was a biologist with the Royal Belgian Institute of Natural Sciences.

Gosse went on missions in South America with Leopold III of Belgium.

Gosse described the following species:

- Cichlasoma lyonsi, 1966 (Amphilophus)
- Geophagus wavrini, 1963 (Biotodoma)
- Geophagus harreri, 1976 (Geophagus)
- Pterophyllum leopoldi, 1963 (Pterophyllum)
- Retroculus septentrionalis, 1971 (Retroculus)
- Retroculus xinguensis, 1971 (Retroculus)

== Taxon described by him ==
- See Category:Taxa named by Jean-Pierre Gosse

== Taxon named in his honor ==
Lethrinops gossei W. E. Burgess & H. R. Axelrod, 1973
