= Papilio (disambiguation) =

Papilio is a genus of swallowtail butterflies. Papilio could also refer to:

== Species ==
=== Animals ===
- Clavus papilio, species of sea snail
- Chaetopleura papilio, species of chiton
- Enteromius papilio, species of ray-finned fish
- Eocallionymus papilio, species of dragonet
- Eutrachelophis papilio, species of snake
- Eurypegasus papilio, species of ray-finned fish
- Hemimyzon papilio, species of ray-finned fish
- Neocancilla papilio, species of sea snail

=== Plants ===
- Acer papilio, species of maple trees
- Bulbophyllum papilio, species of orchid
- Psychopsis papilio, species of orchid
- Renanthera papilio, species of orchid

== Other uses ==
- Latin for butterfly
- Papilio (New York Entomological Club), an academic journal focused on entomology from 1881 to 1884
- Soséfo Makapé Papilio (1928–1998), politician from Wallis and Futuna
- Childcare provider in Australia owned by Quadrant Private Equity
