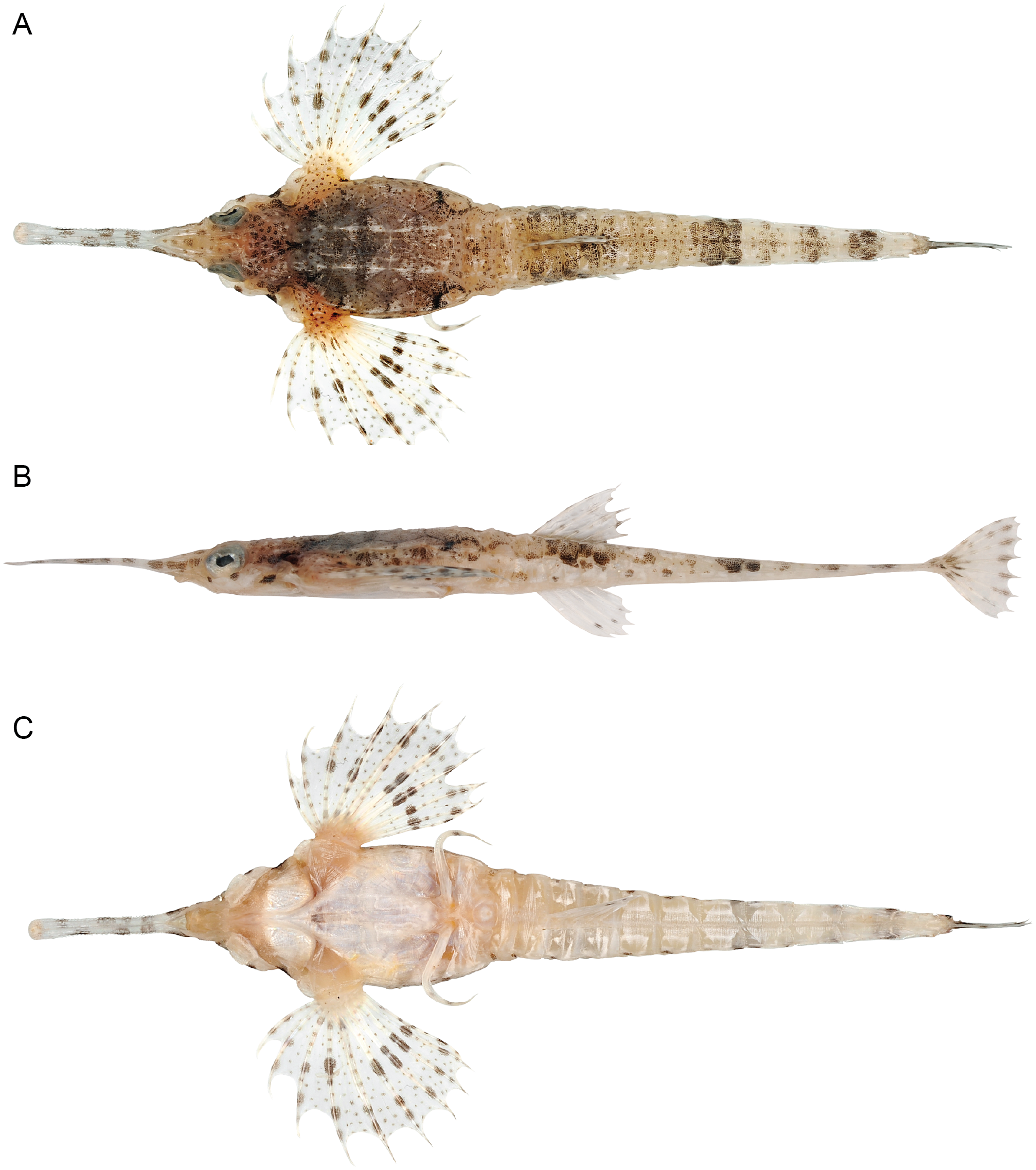
- Holotype

Conservation status
- Data Deficient (IUCN 3.1)

Scientific classification
- Kingdom: Animalia
- Phylum: Chordata
- Class: Actinopterygii
- Order: Syngnathiformes
- Family: Pegasidae
- Genus: Pegasus
- Species: P. tetrabelos

Binomial name
- Pegasus tetrabelos Osterhage, Pogonoski, Appleyard & W. T. White, 2016

= Pegasus tetrabelos =

Species of fish

Pegasus tetrabelos is a species of coastal sea moth which occurs over muddy and sandy substrates in seas off northeastern Australia. It was described in 2016, separated from the more widespread and sympatric P. volitans.

There have been no devoted surveys or population approximations for this particular species. The species is described from 135 specimens that were gathered in scientific trawl surveys between 2003 and 2005.

== Habitat and Ecology ==
Pegasus tetrabelos dwells in sandy substrates at depths ranging from 8 to 40 m. Little is known about their feeding habits, but other members of the family tend to forage on small epifaunal invertebrates like crustaceans.

== Threats ==
The species is caught as bycatch in shrimp trawl fisheries. Nothing is known about trade in this particular species, but substantial target and bycatch fisheries for pegasids occur throughout the Indo-West Pacific for traditional medicine and aquarium use.
