= Pegasus volans =

Pegasus volans may refer to:

- Pegasus volans, a synonym of Pegasus volitans, a modern fish
- Dibango volans, an extinct fish formerly also known as “Pegasus” volans
