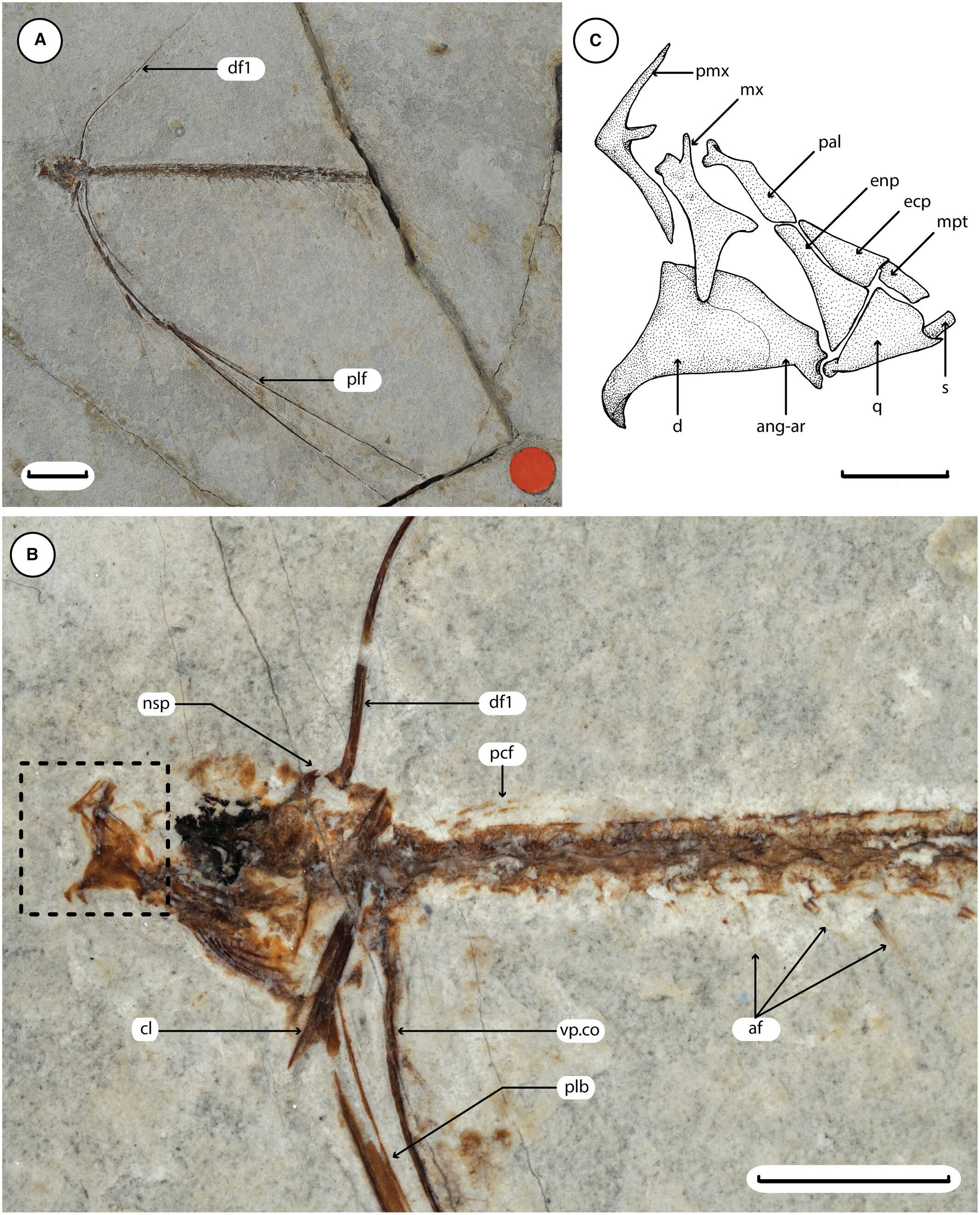
- Holotype specimen and interpretation of the jaw mechanism

Scientific classification
- Kingdom: Animalia
- Phylum: Chordata
- Class: Actinopterygii
- Clade: Percomorpha
- Order: incertae sedis
- Genus: †Dibango; Davesne & Carnevale, 2025
- Species: †D. volans

Binomial name
- †Dibango volans Davesne & Carnevale, 2025

Synonyms
- Pegasus volans Volta, 1796 (preoccupied)

= Dibango volans =

Dibango volans Temporal range: Early Eocene (Late Ypresian), 50–49 Ma

Extinct teleost fish genus

Dibango volans (IPA: [dibɑŋˈgɔ ˈuɔlans]; named after Manu Dibango) is an extinct species of percomorph teleost fish from the Eocene (Late Ypresian-aged) Monte Bolca site in Italy. D. volans is the only species in the genus Dibango, known from two well-preserved specimens. Originally identified in the late 18th century by Giovanni Serafino Volta, it was known as 'Pegasus' volans until its redescription by Davesne & Carnevale in 2025, since the generic name 'Pegasus' was already used to name the seamoth genus Pegasus.

== Research history ==
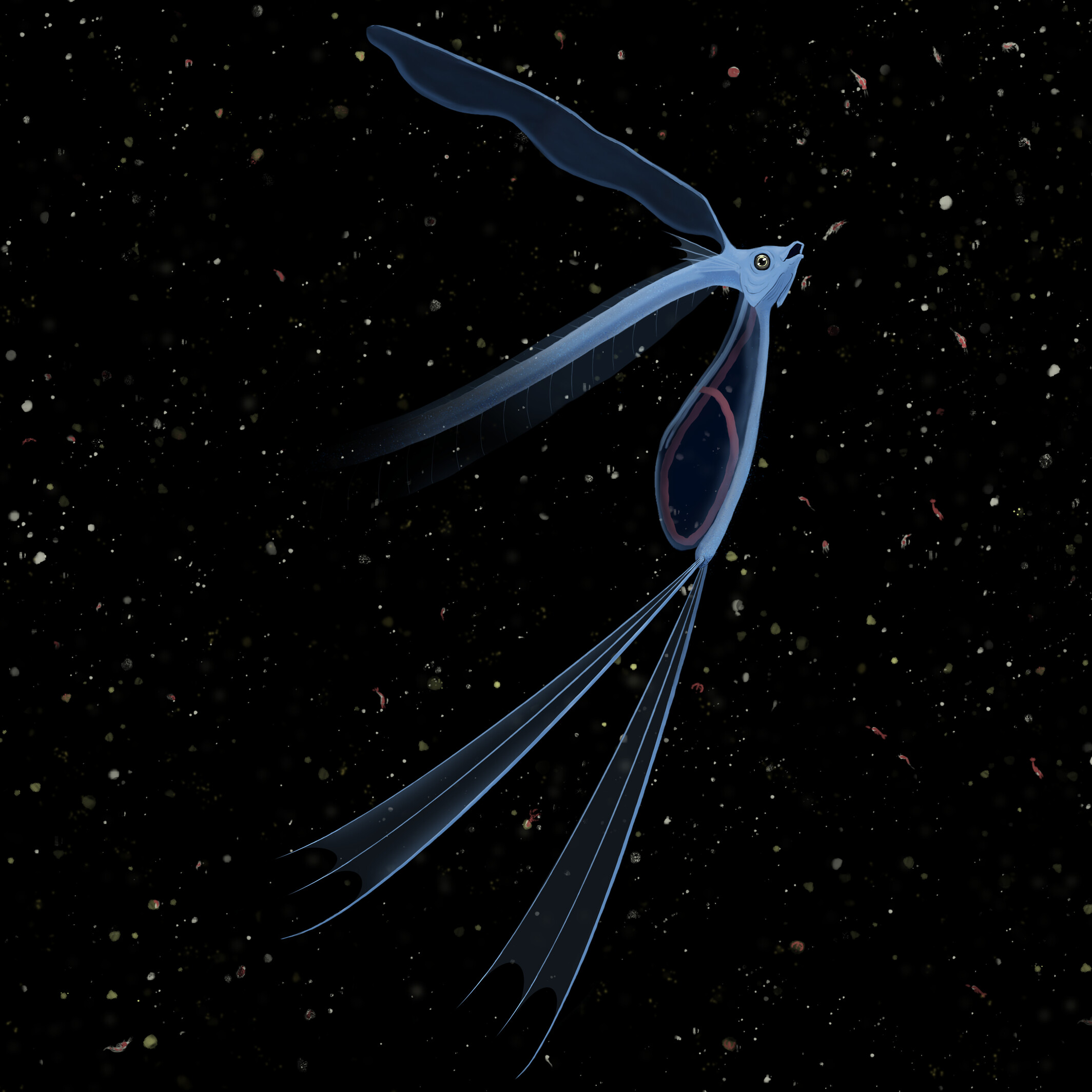
Speculative life restoration of Dibango feeding on bioluminescent plankton

This species was first described by Giovanni Serafino Volta in 1796, and named 'Pegasus volans' by Volta based on two fossil specimens; unbeknownst to him, Carl Linnaeus had already coined 'Pegasus volans' 30 years prior in 1766, which would later be recognized as a junior synonym of Pegasus volitans, a species of sea moth still alive today. The name 'Pegasus volans' continued to be used in the literature by various authors to refer to Volta's specimens until around 2014, when authors started adopting the notation of the genus as 'Pegasus' volans, with the quotations signifying a provisional name.

Davesne & Carnevale (2025) redescribed the taxon and assigned it the new species name Dibango volans, with the new generic name, Dibango (IPA: [dibɑŋˈgɔ]), honouring Cameroonian musician Manu Dibango. The specific name volans (IPA: [ˈuɔlans]) was retained from its original description, and is a Latin word meaning 'flying' and 'moving swiftly'. This study also determined D. volans to be a member of Percomorpha though of uncertain placement.

== Description ==
The holotype specimen, MNHN.F.BOL65/BOL66, consists of an incomplete articulated skeleton missing the posterior part of the body (the tail). The only referred specimen, MCSNV T.293/T.294, preserves less of the postcranial skeleton compared to the holotype, with more of the axial skeleton being lost. The holotype's head length is 6.6 millimetres (0.26 in), while the referred specimen's head length is slightly smaller, at 5.7 millimetres (0.22 in). Similar to other fish fossils from Monte Bolca, both specimens are compression fossils, being preserved as a part and counterpart.

Dibango is notable for its unusual body plan, with an extremely elongate body, a highly reduced abdominal region (with just 3 abdominal vertebrae, suggesting an extremely small abdominal cavity), and enlarged dorsal, pelvic and anal fins. The elongated pelvic fins attaches to an external gut located just below the head, similar to the exterilium of certain larval teleosts. This unique morphology is reminiscent of pelagic fish larvae which live as ichthyoplankton, but the level of ossification on the fossils, with a fully ossified skeleton, suggests that they represent adult individuals (as larval fish typically have incomplete ossification); it is thus more likely that Dibango was a highly paedomorphic fish where mature adults retained a larva-like appearance.

The species possesses tiny dermal spinules covering its whole body, forming an especially dense cluster in the abdominal region; these scales are stellate (star-shaped) and bear an upright spine. Pigmentation is visible on the holotype through examination using ultraviolet light.
