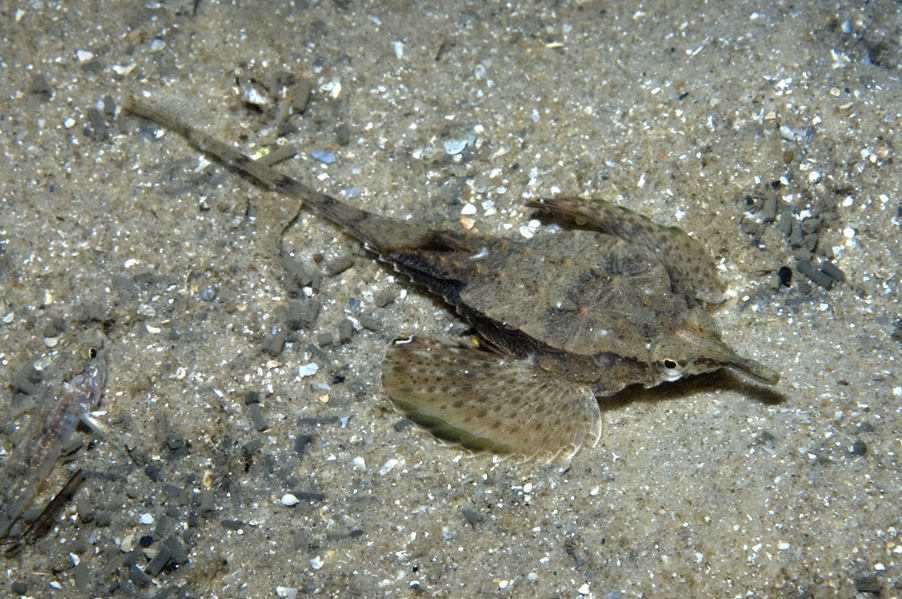

Conservation status
- Least Concern (IUCN 3.1)

Scientific classification
- Kingdom: Animalia
- Phylum: Chordata
- Class: Actinopterygii
- Order: Syngnathiformes
- Family: Pegasidae
- Genus: Pegasus
- Species: P. lancifer

Binomial name
- Pegasus lancifer Kaup, 1861

Synonyms
- Acanthopegasus lancifer (Kaup, 1861); Parapegasus lancifer (Kaup, 1861)

= Pegasus lancifer =

Species of ray-finned fish

Pegasus lancifer, the sculptured seamoth or sculptured dragonfish, is a species of seamoth which is endemic to the temperate seas of southern Australia and Tasmania. They are known to gather in large numbers in the shallows of estuaries. Individuals can bury themselves in the sediment and change colours to camouflage them. The male & female spawn as a pair, swimming with their vents touching around a 1 metre (3.3 ft) above the substrate, while the eggs and sperm are released. After spawning the pair separates and the eggs begin a pelagic phase.

== Gallery ==
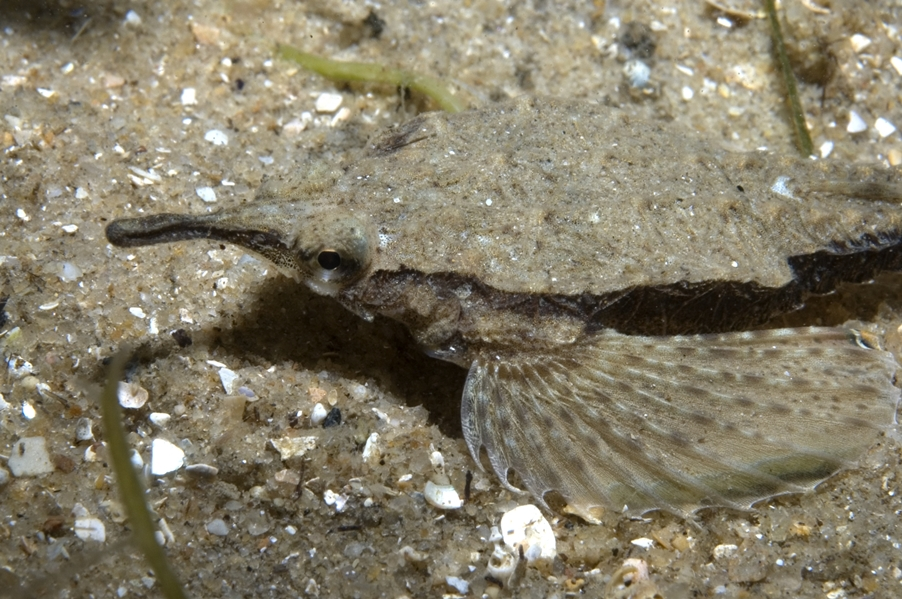

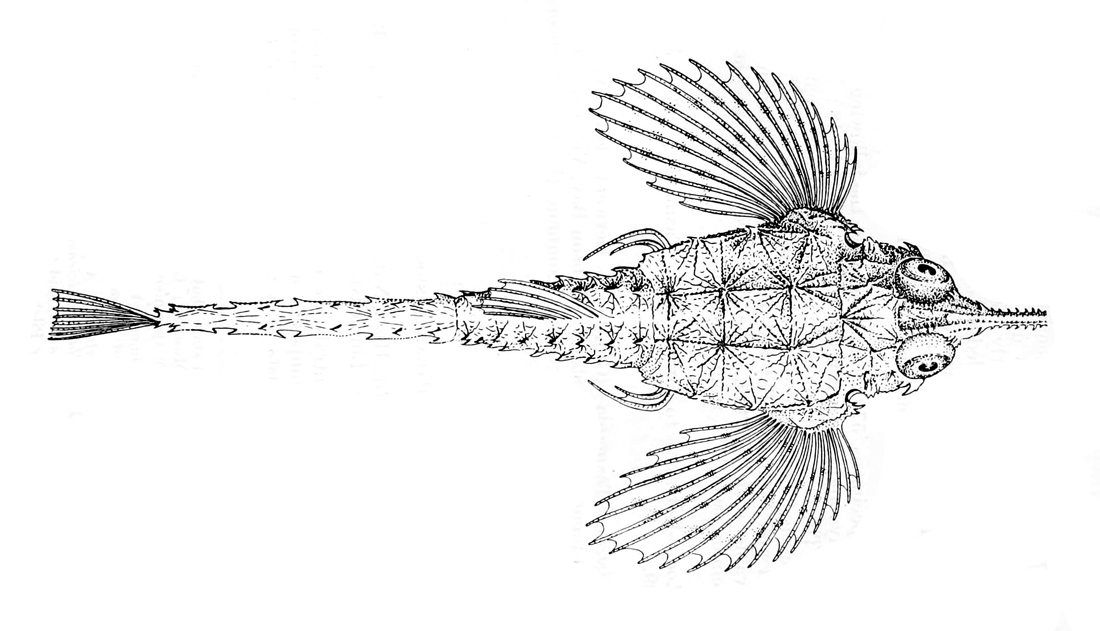
