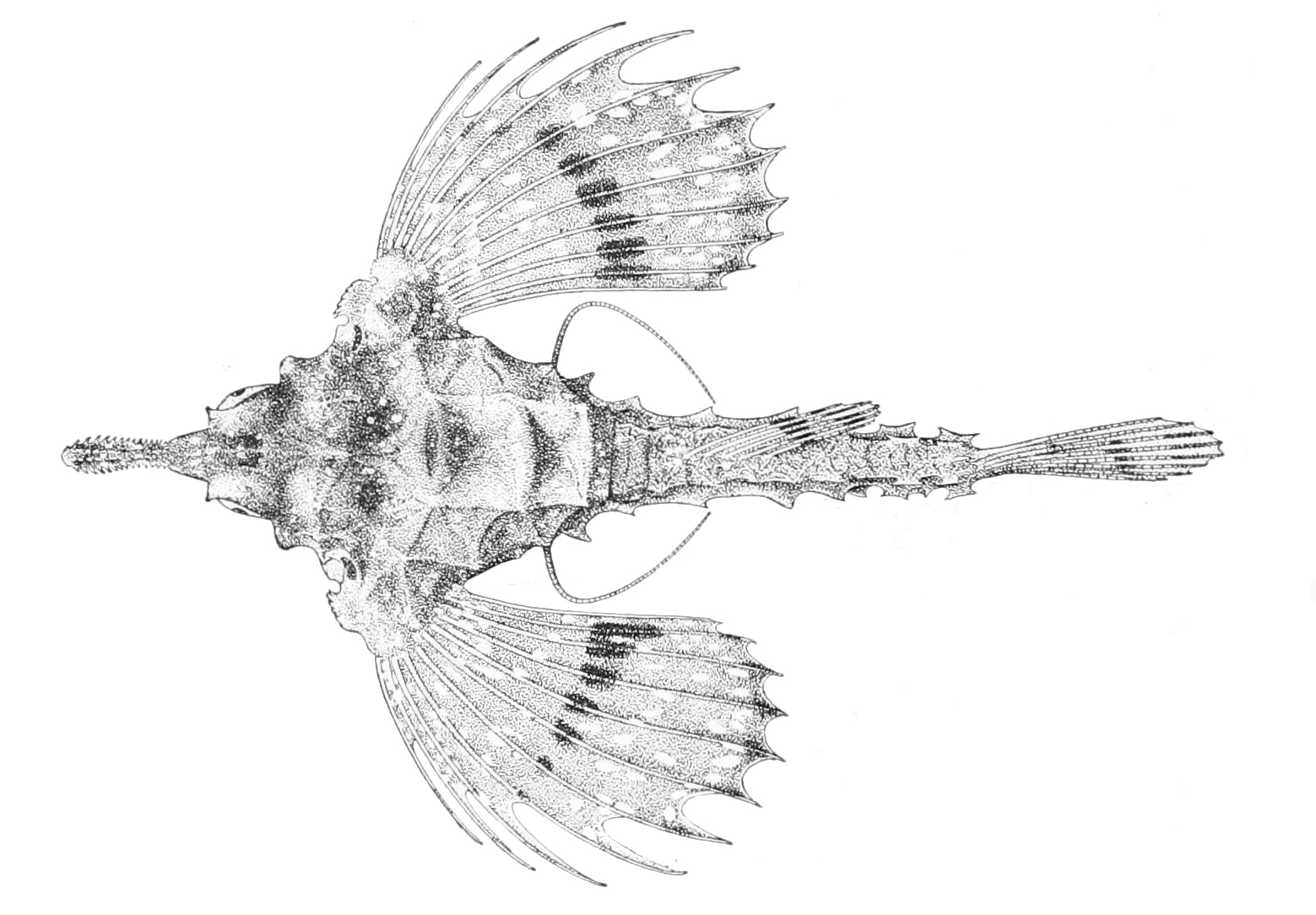

Conservation status
- Least Concern (IUCN 3.1)

Scientific classification
- Kingdom: Animalia
- Phylum: Chordata
- Class: Actinopterygii
- Order: Syngnathiformes
- Family: Pegasidae
- Genus: Eurypegasus
- Species: E. papilio

Binomial name
- Eurypegasus papilio (C. H. Gilbert, 1905)

Synonyms
- Pegasus papilio Gilbert, 1905

= Hawaiian sea-moth fish =

Species of ray-finned fish

The Hawaiian sea-moth fish (Eurypegasus papilio) is a species of ray-finned fish in the family Pegasidae. It is endemic to Hawaii. The only other species in the genus is Eurypegasus draconis.

== Distribution and habitat ==
This species is endemic to the Hawaiian islands but not much is known about its biology. They are demersal and sometimes collected by fishing trawls, with ranges from 80 to 291 meters.

== Anatomy ==
Eurypegasus papilio generally have 8 tail rings and reaches 7.6 cm. Their bodies are flat and encased in bone plates, believed to be for protection against predators. They shed their armor to get rid of parasites up to once every 5 days. They have an interesting feeding mechanism that involves their jaws. Their jaws cannot be seen when their mouths are closed due to being covered by the lachrymal and being tucked in a cavity made by the nasal rostrum. The upper jaw unfolds when the lower jaw sinks, which makes the oral cavity expand and form a tube. This tube mouth is then used by the Eurypegasus papilio to suck up their prey, which happens to be tiny invertebrates living in their demersal habitat.

== Reproduction ==
Eurypegasus papilio reproduces through spawning.

== See also ==
- Eurypegasus
- Little Dragonfish
