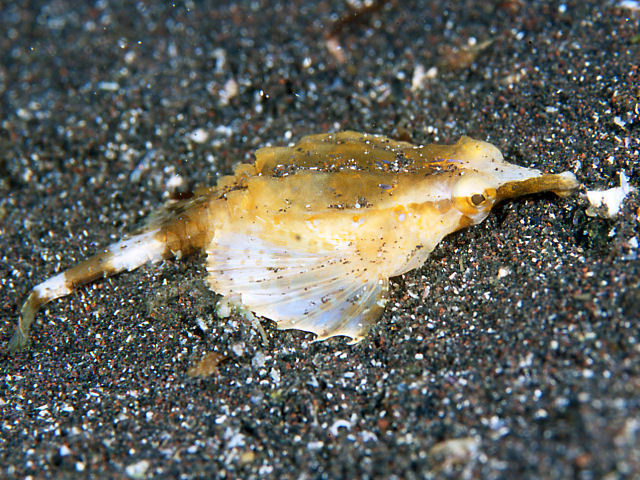

Conservation status
- Data Deficient (IUCN 3.1)

Scientific classification
- Kingdom: Animalia
- Phylum: Chordata
- Class: Actinopterygii
- Order: Syngnathiformes
- Family: Pegasidae
- Genus: Pegasus
- Species: P. laternarius

Binomial name
- Pegasus laternarius G. Cuvier, 1816

= Brick seamoth =

Species of ray-finned fish

The brick seamoth, Pegasus laternarius, also known as the long-tailed dragonfish, long-tailed seamoth, pelagic dragon-fish, or the winged dragonfish, is a species of ray-finned fish in the Pegasidae, or seamoth, family. This species is used extensively in the Guangdong and Guangxi province of China to treat scrofula, cough, and diarrhea.

== Etymology ==
Their genus name, Pegasus is taken from the Greek mythological creature the Pegasus, or a winged horse of Perseus. Their species name, laternarius is derived from the Latin word later, meaning "made of bricks".

== Description ==
Pegasus laternarius grows up to 8 centimetres (3.1 in). They have a variety of colors but are mainly yellow to blue with a dark brown underside. Juveniles and females have a shorter rostrum than adult males.

== Diet and behavior ==
This species of seamoth is generally found in muddy bottoms around 50 metres (160 ft), while the larvae is planktonic. They rarely live other than several places in Japan where they are found in sheltered muddy areas.

== Distribution ==
It is found in China, Japan, Taiwan, and Thailand in the Indo-West Pacific ocean. The brick seamoth is found in depths from 30 metres (98 ft) to 100 metres (330 ft).
