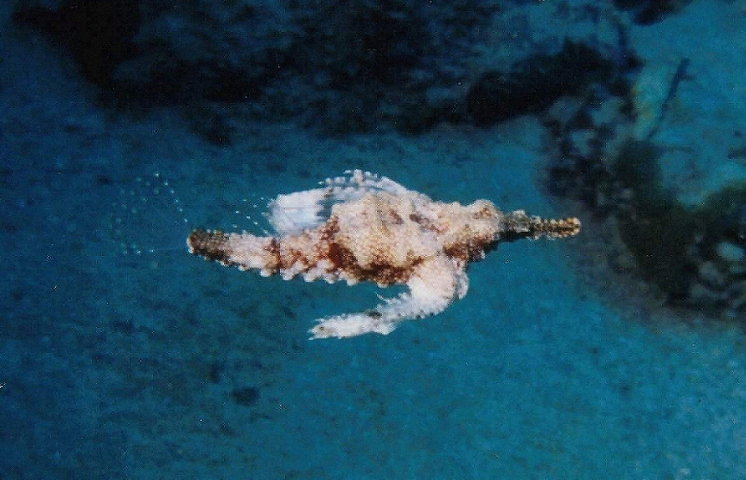
- Short Dragonfish (E. draconis)

Scientific classification
- Kingdom: Animalia
- Phylum: Chordata
- Class: Actinopterygii
- Order: Syngnathiformes
- Family: Pegasidae
- Genus: Eurypegasus; Bleeker, 1863

Type species
- Pegasus draconis Linnaeus, 1766

Synonyms
- Zalises Jordan & Snyder, 1901

= Eurypegasus =

Genus of ray-finned fishes

Eurypegasus is one of two genera of seamoths in the family Pegasidae. Species in this genus are native to the Indian and Pacific Oceans.

== Species ==
There are currently two recognized species in this genus:

- Eurypegasus draconis (Linnaeus, 1766) (Short dragonfish)
- Eurypegasus papilio (C. H. Gilbert, 1905) (Hawaiian sea-moth)
