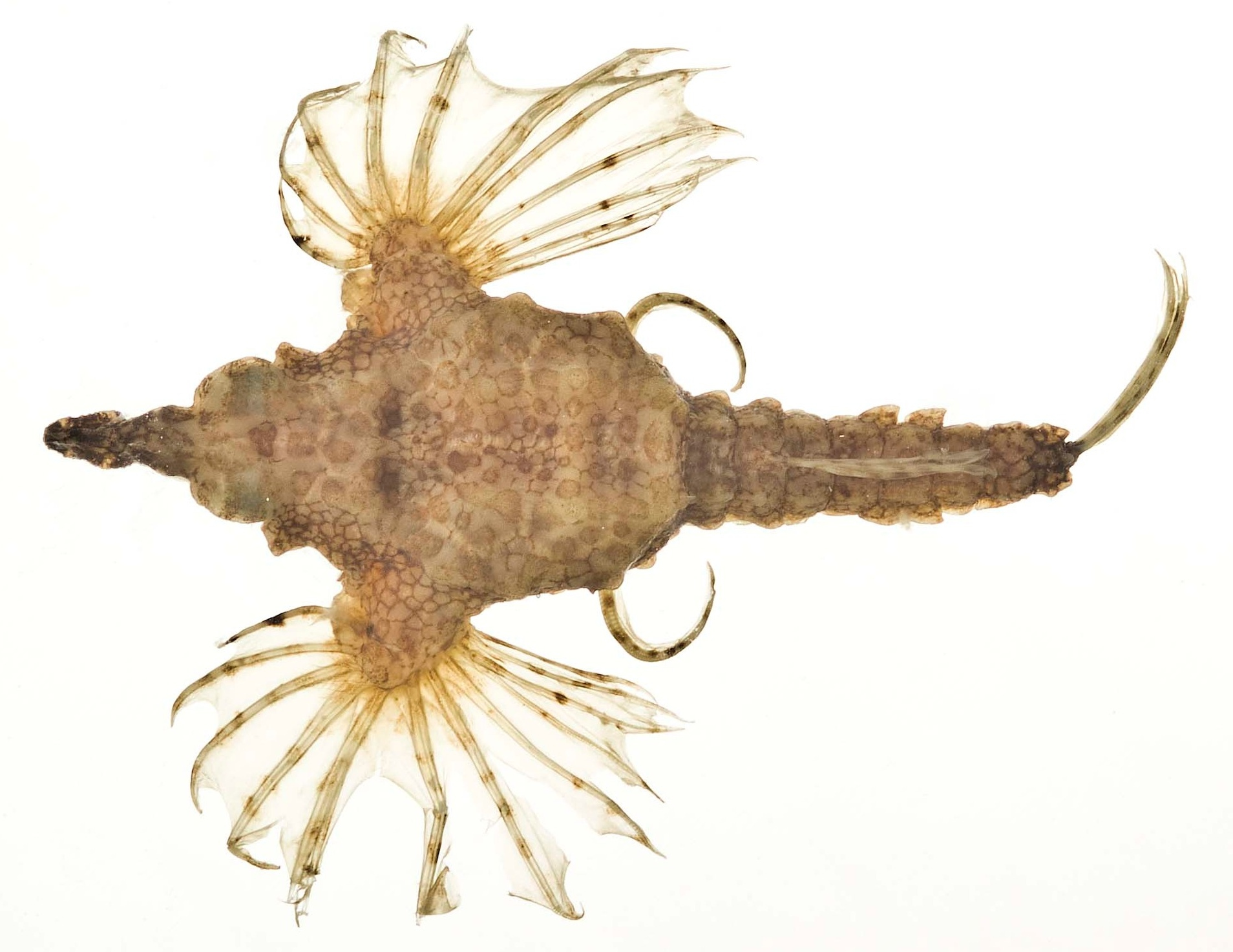

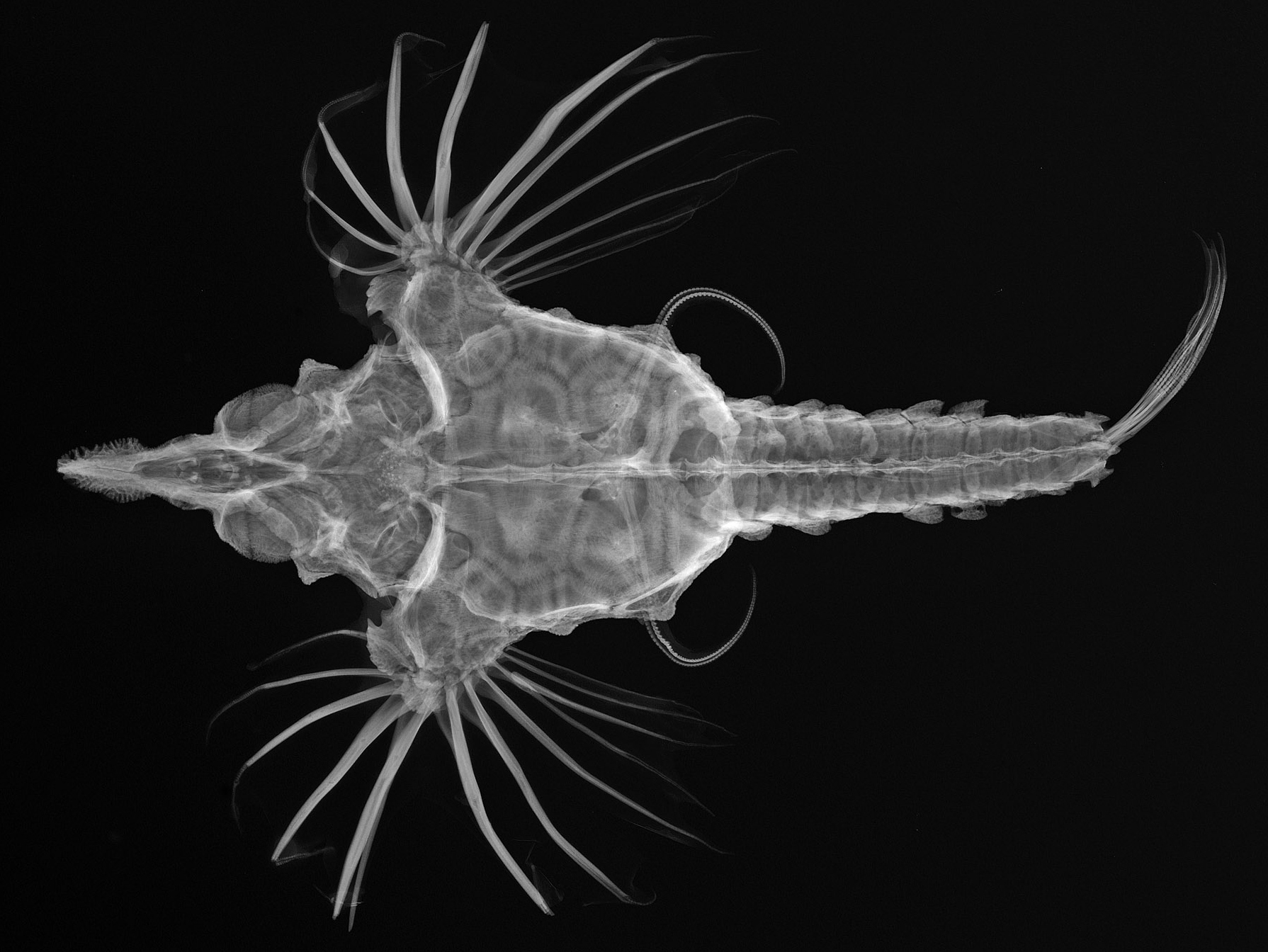
- Eurypegasus draconis, conventional and X-ray images

Conservation status
- Least Concern (IUCN 3.1)

Scientific classification
- Kingdom: Animalia
- Phylum: Chordata
- Class: Actinopterygii
- Division: Teleostei
- Order: Syngnathiformes
- Family: Pegasidae
- Genus: Eurypegasus
- Species: E. draconis

Binomial name
- Eurypegasus draconis (Linnaeus, 1766)

Synonyms
- Cataphractus draco Gronow, 1854; Pegasus draco Shaw, 1804; Pegasus draconis Linnaeus, 1766; Pegasus latirostris Richardson, 1846; Pegasus pauciradiatus Ogilby, 1886; Pegasus umitengu (Jordan & Snyder, 1901); Surypegasus draconis (Linnaeus, 1766); Zalises draconis (Linnaeus, 1766); Zalises umitengu Jordan & Snyder, 1901

= Little dragonfish =

Species of ray-finned fish

The little dragonfish or short dragonfish (Eurypegasus draconis) is a species of marine ray-finned fish in the family Pegasidae. It is widespread throughout the tropical waters of the Indo-Pacific, including the Red Sea.

The little dragonfish can grow up to 10 cm (3.9 in) length. It sheds its skin in one piece. Millions of these kind of fish are sold for traditional medicine each year in China and Hong Kong alone.
