= Clavus papilio =

Scientific classification
- Kingdom: Animalia
- Phylum: Mollusca
- Class: Gastropoda
- Subclass: Caenogastropoda
- Order: Neogastropoda
- Superfamily: Conoidea
- Family: Drilliidae
- Genus: Clavus
- Species: C. papilio

Binomial name
- Clavus papilio Kilburn, 1988

Synonyms
- Tylotiella papilio Kilburn, 1988 (original combination)

Species of gastropod

Clavus papilio is a species of sea snail, a marine gastropod mollusk in the family Drilliidae.

== Description ==
The length of the shell attains 12 mm.

== Distribution ==
This marine species occurs off Zululand, South Africa.
