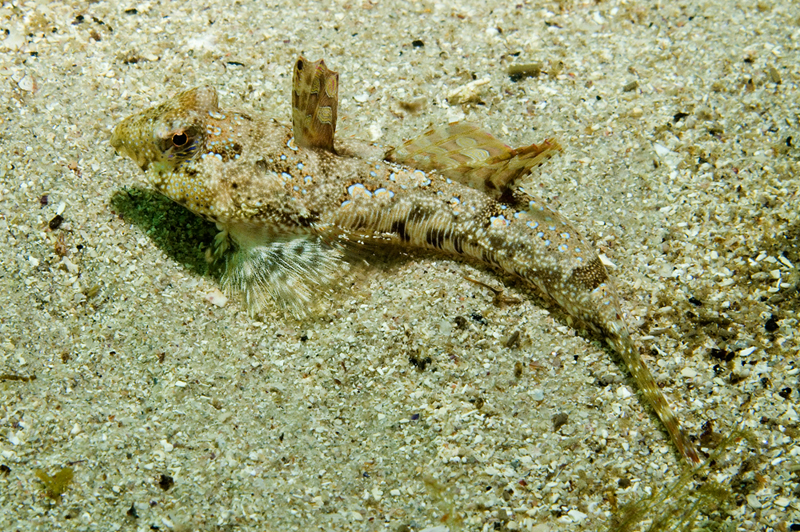
- Eocallionymus papilio in New South Wales, Australia

Conservation status
- Least Concern (IUCN 3.1)

Scientific classification
- Kingdom: Animalia
- Phylum: Chordata
- Class: Actinopterygii
- Order: Syngnathiformes
- Family: Callionymidae
- Genus: Eocallionymus; Nakabo, 1982
- Species: E. papilio

Binomial name
- Eocallionymus papilio (Günther, 1864)

Synonyms
- Callionymus papilio Günther, 1864 Callionymus lateralis Macleay, 1881 Callionymus macleayi Ogilby, 1886 Callionymus ocellifer Castelnau, 1873

= Eocallionymus =

Species of fish

The painted stinkfish or painted dragonet (Eocallionymus papilio) is a species of dragonet endemic to the Indian Ocean coasts of Australia and Tasmania where it is found at a depth of about 50 metres (160 ft). This species grows to a length of 10 centimetres (3.9 in) TL. This species is the only known member of its genus.
