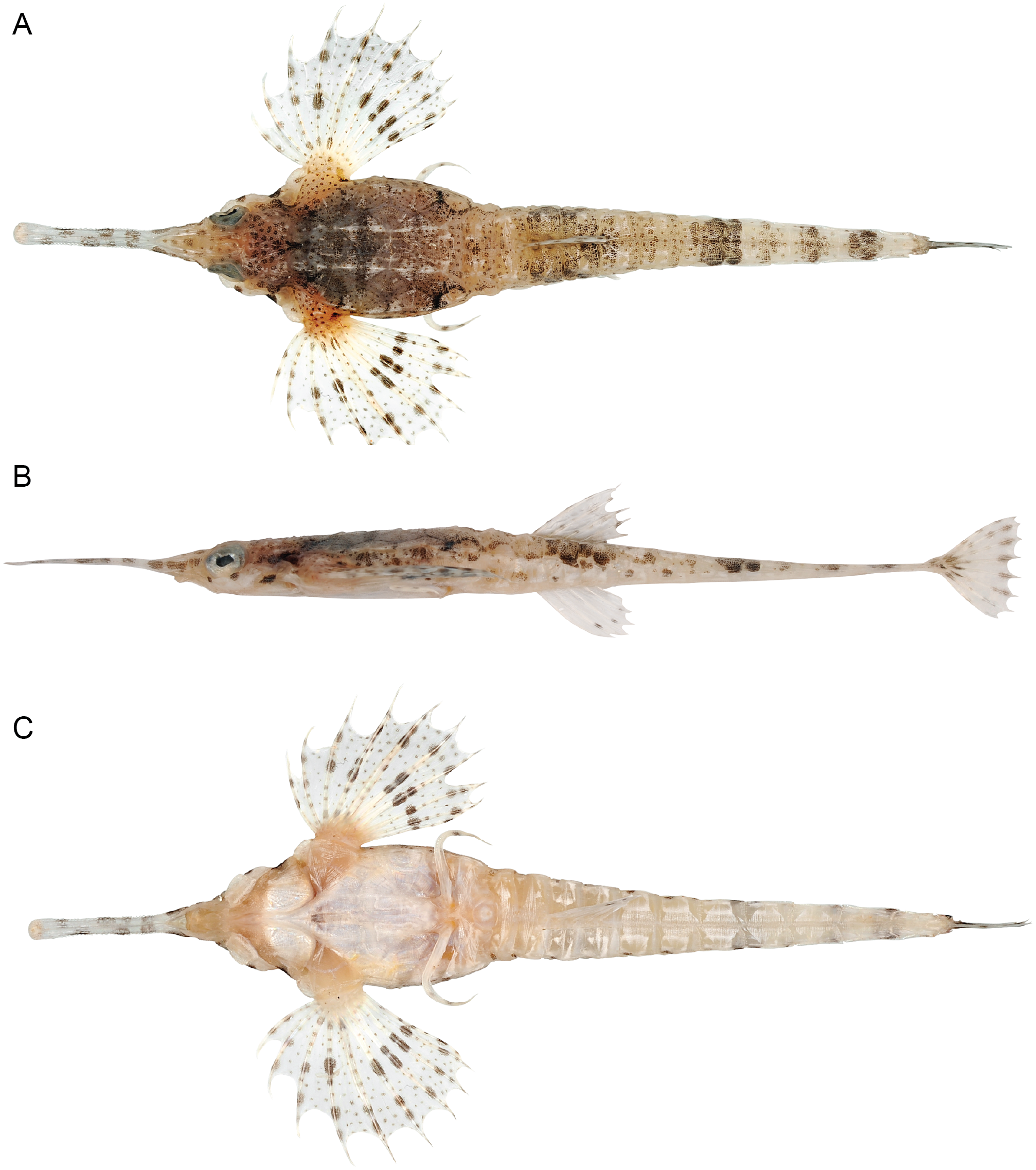
- Pegasus tetrabelos

Scientific classification
- Kingdom: Animalia
- Phylum: Chordata
- Class: Actinopterygii
- Division: Teleostei
- Order: Syngnathiformes
- Family: Pegasidae
- Genus: Pegasus; Linnaeus, 1758

Type species
- Pegasus volitans Linnaeus, 1758

Synonyms
- Acanthopegasus McCulloch, 1915; Cataphractus Gronow, 1763; Leptopegasus Bleeker, 1872; Parapegasus Duméril, 1870; Spinipegasus Rendahl, 1930

= Pegasus (fish) =

Genus of ray-finned fishes

Pegasus is a genus of seamoths found in coastal tropical marine waters. The name was taken from the winged horse Pegasus in Greek mythology. The member species are distributed in the Indo-West Pacific Ocean waters around: Australia, Bahrain, China, India, Indonesia, Japan, Malaysia, Mozambique, Myanmar, the Philippines, Saudi Arabia, Singapore, Taiwan, Tanzania and Thailand.

== Species ==
There are currently 5 recognized species in this genus:

- Pegasus lancifer Kaup, 1861 (Sculptured seamoth)
- Pegasus laternarius G. Cuvier, 1816 (Brick seamoth)
- Pegasus volitans Linnaeus, 1758 (Long-tail seamoth)
- Pegasus tetrabelos Osterhage, Pogonoski, Appleyard & W. T. White, 2016 (Short-spined seamoth)
- Pegasus sinensis Ying-Yi Zhang, Rong-Rong Zhang, Shao-Bo Ma, Shuai-Shuai Liu, Qiang Lin and Xin Wang], 2022 (Chinese seamoth)
