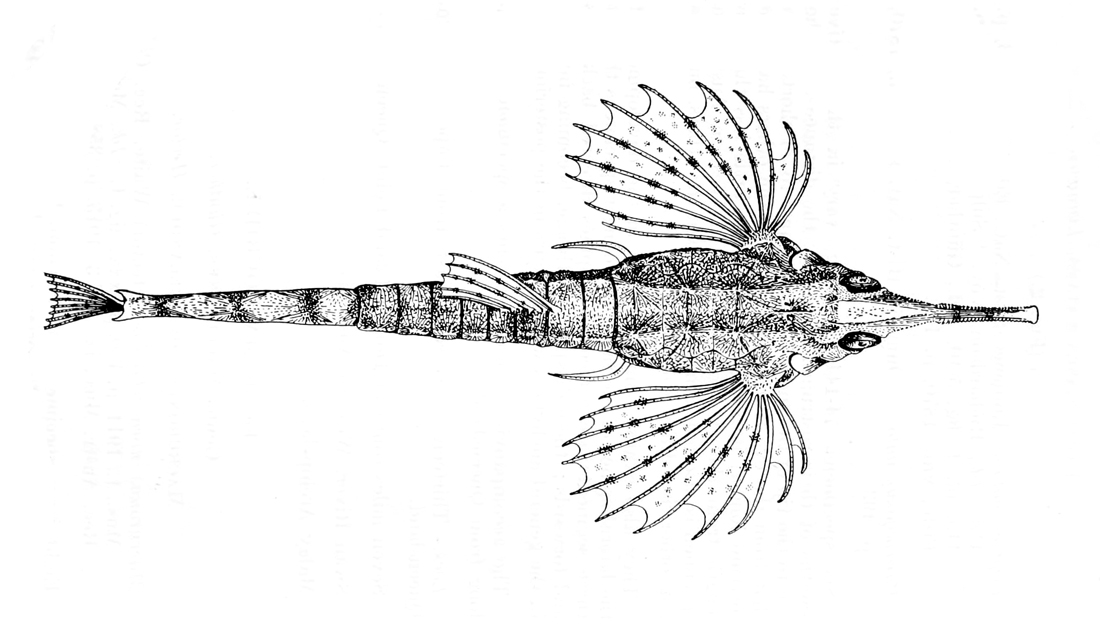

Conservation status
- Data Deficient (IUCN 3.1)

Scientific classification
- Kingdom: Animalia
- Phylum: Chordata
- Class: Actinopterygii
- Division: Teleostei
- Order: Syngnathiformes
- Family: Pegasidae
- Genus: Pegasus
- Species: P. volitans

Binomial name
- Pegasus volitans Linnaeus, 1758

Synonyms
- Pegasus spatula Lacépède, 1800; Parapegasus volitans (Linnaeus, 1758); Pegasus natans Linnaeus, 1766; Leptopegasus natans (Linnaeus, 1766); Parapegasus natans (Linnaeus, 1766); Pegasus volans Linnaeus, 1766; Pegasus pristis Bleeker, 1852; Cataphractus anceps Gronow, 1854

= Longtail seamoth =

Species of ray-finned fish

The longtail seamoth (Pegasus volitans) is a species of ray-finned fish in the family Pegasidae. It is found around the coasts of Australia, Bahrain, China, India, Indonesia, Malaysia, Mozambique, Myanmar, the Philippines, Saudi Arabia, Singapore, Taiwan, Tanzania, and Thailand. This fish is used in Chinese medicine and in the aquarium trade.
