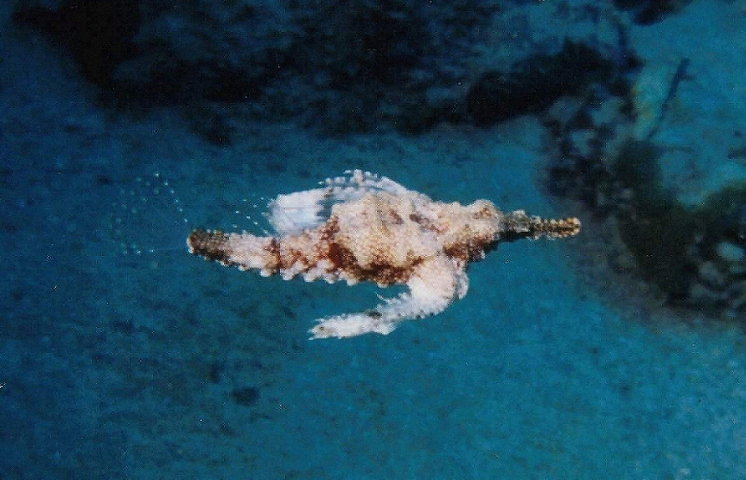
- Little dragonfish, Eurypegasus draconis

Scientific classification
- Kingdom: Animalia
- Phylum: Chordata
- Class: Actinopterygii
- Division: Teleostei
- Clade: Percomorpha
- Order: Syngnathiformes
- Suborder: Dactylopteroidei
- Family: Pegasidae; Bonaparte, 1831

Genera
- Eurypegasus; Pegasus

= Pegasidae =

Seamoth

Family of ray-finned fishes

The seamoths make up a family of ray-finned fishes, the Pegasidae, within the order Syngnathiformes. They are named after Pegasus, a creature from Greek mythology. Seamoths are notable for their unusual appearance, including flattened bodies, the presence of large, wing-like, pectoral fins, a long snout, and a body encased in thick, bony plates. They are found primarily in coastal tropical waters of the Indo-Pacific.

== Biology ==
Seamoths have modified pelvic fins that allow them to "walk" across the sea bottom where they live. Their jaws are ventral, located behind their long rostrum, and are toothless. Their mouth is highly specialized, and can form a tube-like mouth used to suck worms and other small invertebrates from their burrows. They periodically molt their skin, perhaps as often as every five days.

== Conservation ==
Pegasus lancifer and the two Eurypegasus species are listed as Least Concern by the IUCN, while the remaining species of seamoth remain Data Deficient. Threats to seamoths come from various sources, including fisheries where they are caught as bycatch or on purpose for use in traditional Chinese medicines. They are also collected for sale in the aquarium trade. Bottom trawls and coastal development may detrimentally alter habitat used by benthic seamoths. Life history characteristics such as low population sizes and monogamy with long-term pair bonding put them at risk of exploitation.
