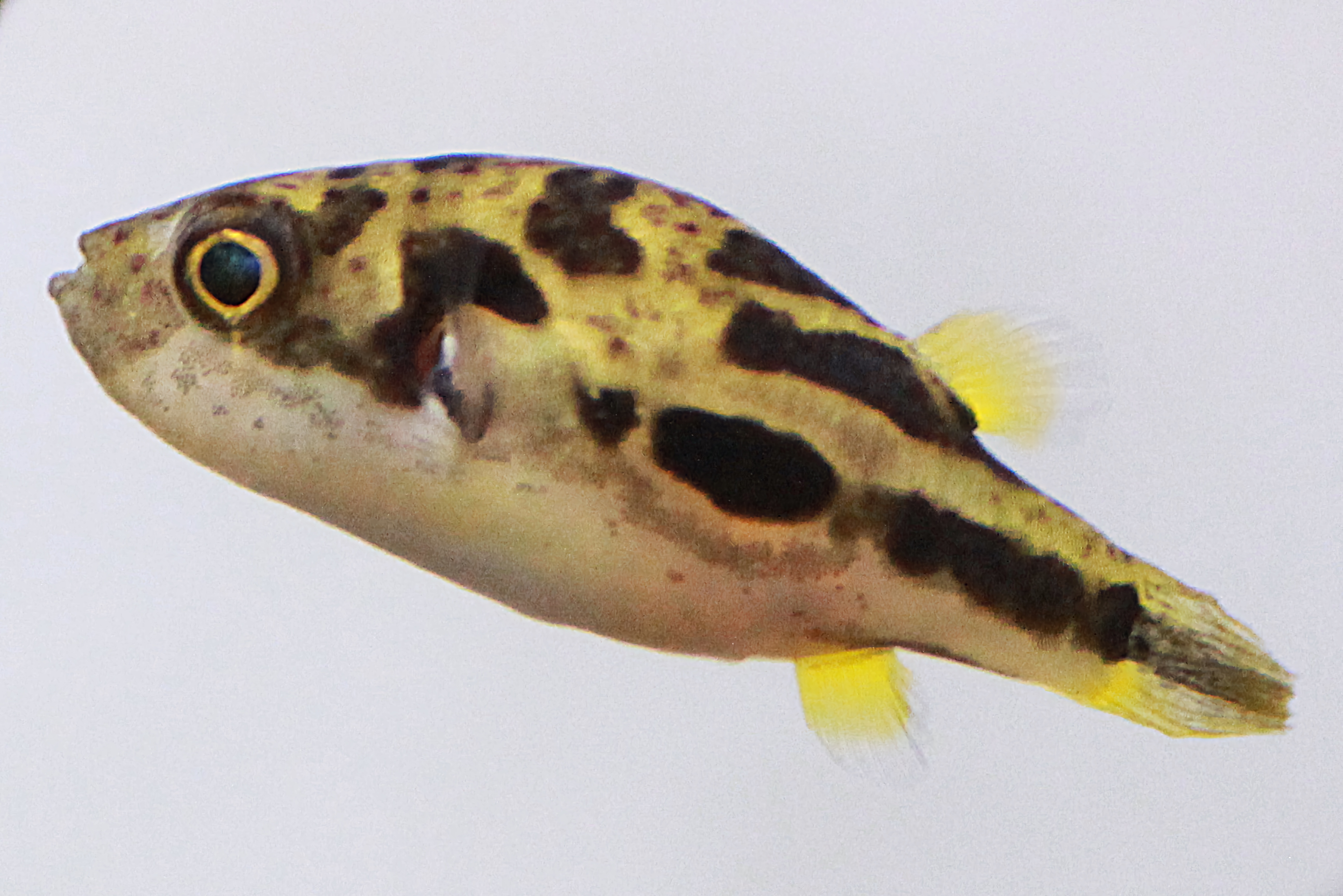

Conservation status
- Vulnerable (IUCN 3.1)

Scientific classification
- Kingdom: Animalia
- Phylum: Chordata
- Class: Actinopterygii
- Division: Teleostei
- Order: Tetraodontiformes
- Family: Tetraodontidae
- Genus: Carinotetraodon
- Species: C. travancoricus

Binomial name
- Carinotetraodon travancoricus (Hora & K.K. Nair, 1941)
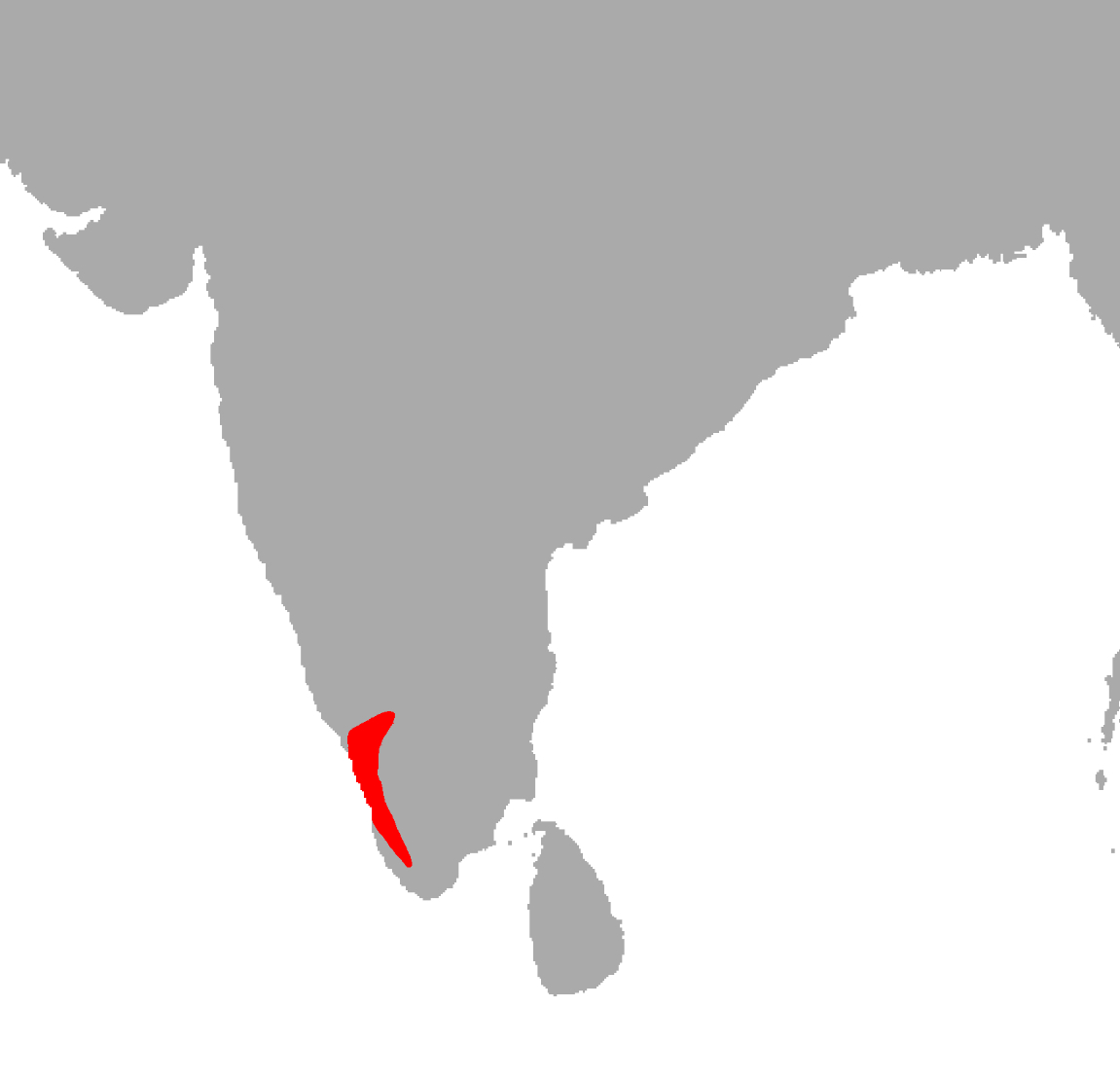

Synonyms
- Tetraodon travancoricus Hora & K.K. Nair, 1941; Monotretus travancoricus (Hora & K.K. Nair, 1941)

= Dwarf pufferfish =

Species of fish

The dwarf pufferfish (Carinotetraodon travancoricus), also known as the Malabar pufferfish, pygmy pufferfish, or pea pufferfish, is a small freshwater pufferfish endemic to Kerala and southern Karnataka in Southwest India. They are popular in aquaria for their bright colours and small size. At a maximum total length of 3.5 cm, dwarf pufferfish are one of the smallest pufferfish in the world. They closely resemble the related Carinotetraodon imitator, and the two can be difficult to distinguish. C. imitator was not recognised as a different species until 1999.

Dwarf pufferfish dwell at the bottom of heavily vegetated waterways, predating small animals. Unlike other species of pufferfish, they are found in large groups in the wild. They breed throughout most of the year, with spawning pairs producing 1–5 eggs in 1–4 day intervals. Habitat loss and overharvesting for the aquarium trade threaten wild populations of dwarf pufferfish.

== Taxonomy ==
The dwarf pufferfish was first described as Tetraodon (Monotretus) travancoricus in 1941 by S.L. Hora and K.K. Nair, with the type locality given as "Pamba River, Central Travancore". The use of parentheses indicates Monotretus is the subgenus of Tetraodon. Carinotetraodon was considered a synonym of Tetraodon until 1978, when J.C. Tyler treated it as a valid genus in a paper about Carinotetraodon lorteti, which was an opinion followed by M. Kottelat et al. in 1993 and K.K.P. Lim and M. Kottelat in 1995. The first use of "Carinotetraodon travancoricus" was in 1999 by R. Britz and M. Kottelat when first describing Carinotetraodon imitator, a superficially similar and closely related species previously mistaken for dwarf pufferfish. "Carinotetraodon" is derived from the Latin word "carina" (keel-shaped, shell) and Greek words "tetra" (four) and "odous" (teeth). The justification for moving to Carinotetraodon was based largely on osteological evidence and not on the presence of skin keels, which other members of the genus have, but which had not been confirmed in dwarf pufferfish until one year later in aquarium literature. Specifically, dwarf pufferfish possess vertebral modifications and a reduced number of total vertebrae similar to other members of Carinotetraodon, in addition to a small size and the presence of sexual dimorphism, also found amongst other members of this genus.

The following cladogram is based on molecular evidence and demonstrates the polyphyletic nature of the genus Carinotetraodon. A polyphyletic genus is one in which members share common characteristics, but do not necessarily share an immediate common ancestor, and their placement is based on these shared traits rather than confirmed, empirical evidence. "Carinotetraodon" is represented in quotation marks to signify its polyphyletic status. Freshwater species are denoted with "FW". The cladogram is incomplete due to the absence of species like C. imitator, which have not undergone mitogenome analyses.

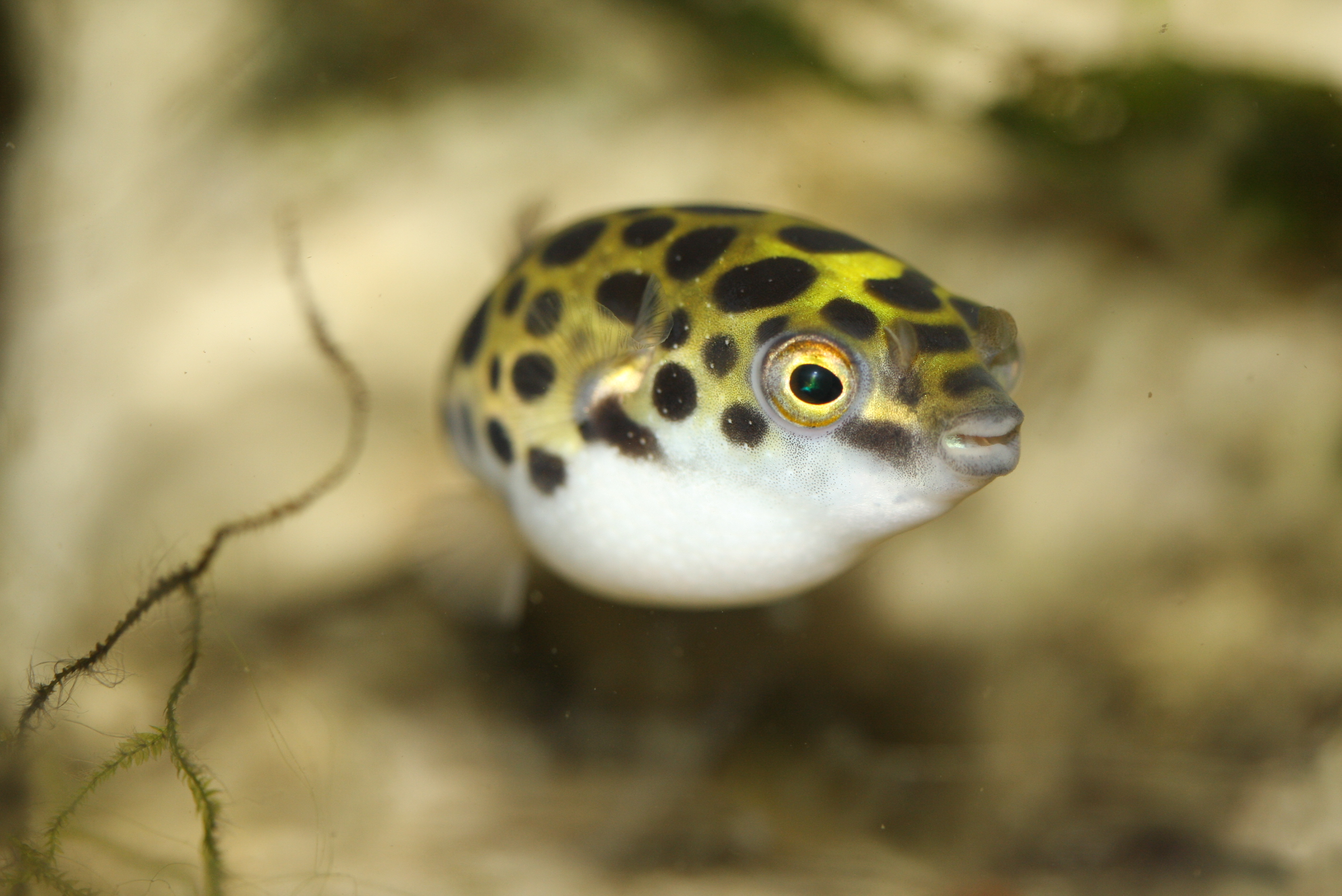
The closely related Dichotomyctere nigroviridis

- Tetraodontidae
  - - - Auriglobus modestus
      - - Leiodon cutcutia^{FW}
        - - - "Carinotetraodon" salivator^{FW}
            - - "Carinotetraodon" lorteti^{FW}
              - "Carinotetraodon" irrubesco^{FW}
          - - Pao palembangensis^{FW}
            - Pao cochinchinensis^{FW}
    - - - - "Carinotetraodon" travancoricus^{FW}
        - - - Dichotomyctere nigroviridis
            - Dichotomyctere ocellatus
      - - - Pelagocephalus marki
        - - - Canthigaster coronata
            - - Canthigaster rivulata
              - - Canthigaster jactator
                - Canthigaster valentini
    - - - - Chelonodon pleurospilus
        - - Chelonodon patoca
      - - - Tetraodon miurus^{FW}
        - - Tetraodon mbu^{FW}

== Description ==
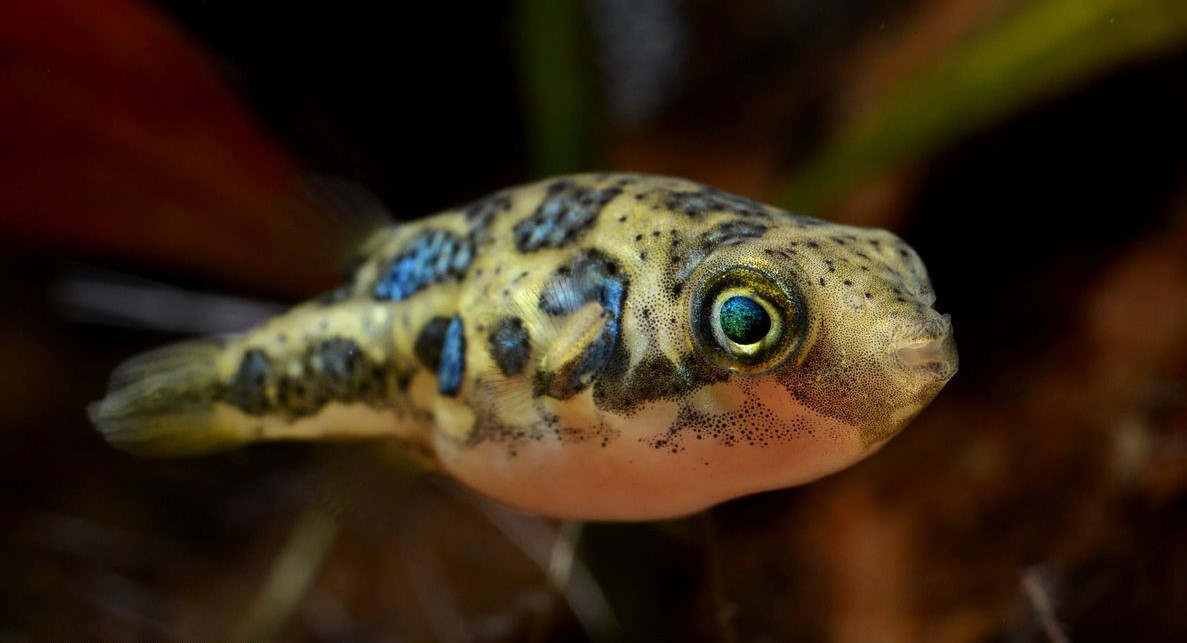
Dwarf pufferfish have dark, iridescent patches on their flanks and dorsal surfaces

The maximum documented size is 3.5 cm (1.4 in) total length (TL), with individuals typically reaching less than 2.5 cm (0.98 in) TL, making dwarf pufferfish one of the smallest pufferfish in the world. Both sexes are primarily greenish-yellow, with dark green to brown-black iridescent patches on the flanks and dorsal surface. Patterns and colouration vary considerably between individuals. Their pectoral fins are short, fan-shaped, and described as "slightly emarginate", that is to say, slightly indented at the tip. The dorsal and anal fins are situated opposite each other toward the posterior of the fish, both short and round, while the caudal fin is larger than the other fins and truncate, in that it terminates in a more-or-less vertical edge. Their bodies are round and oblong. As with other members of the genus, sexual dimorphism is apparent in mature fish, with males being more brightly coloured than females and having a yellow ventral surface. Males can also have a dark stripe down the centre of their pale belly and iridescent, blue "eye wrinkle" patterns that females do not have. Females are more rounded, tend to be larger than males, and may have more small spots between their larger dark markings. Their abdomens are white, and they may have a yellow patch on their throat.

=== Natural defenses ===
All pufferfish can inflate, or "puff up", their bodies by quickly ingesting large amounts of water (or air when necessary) into their highly elastic stomachs. Inflating tires pufferfish and can put them at greater risk of predation. Like many other pufferfish, in the absence of scales, dwarf pufferfish have skin spines on most of their body. These spines become erect when the fish is inflated. Dwarf pufferfish, like many other Tetraodontiformes, produce tetrodotoxin, a highly lethal neurotoxin for which there is no antidote. The neurotoxin accumulates in the glands of the epidermis (surface layer of skin), ovaries, and livers of pufferfish. These traits are anti-predator adaptations. The pufferfish's ability to inflate makes it difficult to swallow or bite, and the tetrodotoxin makes it unpalatable or even deadly for other fish. Biologists believe these adaptations evolved because of the slow swimming speeds of pufferfish.

=== Resemblance to Carinotetraodon imitator ===
Carinotetraodon imitator is a species of related pufferfish closely resembling dwarf pufferfish. They are of similar size, shape, patterns, and colouration. Both species are found within the same region and may be sympatric, possibly inhabiting the same waters. Until 1999, C. imitator was mistaken as the same species, and the two could be found together in aquaria and were widely available in the international aquarium trade, both sold as dwarf pufferfish. Dwarf pufferfish can be distinguished from their congener (a member of the same genus), as C. imitator have smaller, faint blotches compared to dwarf pufferfish, as well as greatly reduced body spination. Male dwarf pufferfish have a darker yellow colouration and an iridescent "eye wrinkle" not found in males of C. imitator.

== Distribution and habitat ==
Global distribution

Although closely related to marine pufferfish, they are not found in salt water, and reports to the contrary are based on misidentification. Dwarf pufferfish are one of only 27 known species of Tetraodontidae adapted to freshwater. They are a potamodromous species, meaning they migrate within freshwater river systems, and are endemic to rivers, lakes, and estuaries in Kerala and southern Karnataka in the Western Ghats of Peninsular India. They can be found in waters with a pH of 7.5–8.3 and temperatures of 22–28 °C (72–82 °F). Inhabiting heavily vegetated waters with beds of gravel and rock or clay loam with silt and sand, the species is reported from 13 rivers in Kerala, lakes such as Vembanad, the Nilambur harbours, and Kallar Stream, part of the Neyyar Wildlife Sanctuary. They have been reported as rare in Bharathapuzha and the Nilgiri Biosphere Reserve. The species was also found in inundated brickyards in Puthukkad, as well as ditches, ponds, irrigation channels, and artificial tanks or abandoned water bodies in paddy fields. Their presence in small, isolated water bodies is likely due to unintentional dispersal by waterfowl.

=== Conservation status ===
Several researchers have considered the species endangered, though with no rationale provided. The dwarf pufferfish is officially classified as vulnerable on the IUCN Red List due to declining populations because of damming, indiscriminate deforestation for agriculture, pollution from wastewater, and, primarily, overfishing for the aquarium trade. In 2010, some researchers estimated that the population would decline by 30–40% from 2005 to 2015, while others estimated it had already declined by the same amount between 2005 and 2010.

== Diet and behaviour ==
Dwarf pufferfish are euryphagous carnivores in that they consume a wide variety of animals. Dwarf pufferfish favour insect larvae but will rely on crustaceans and annelids as alternate feed when the availability of preferable prey decreases. Their diet in the wild mainly consists of small animals such as water fleas, rotifers, copepods, and seed shrimp, and aquatic larvae such as those of Odonata, Hemiptera, mayflies, and flies, with some amounts of plant matter, largely diatoms and green algae. Sand and detritus, presumably ingested by mistake when feeding on small, bottom-dwelling animals, have also been found in their gut.

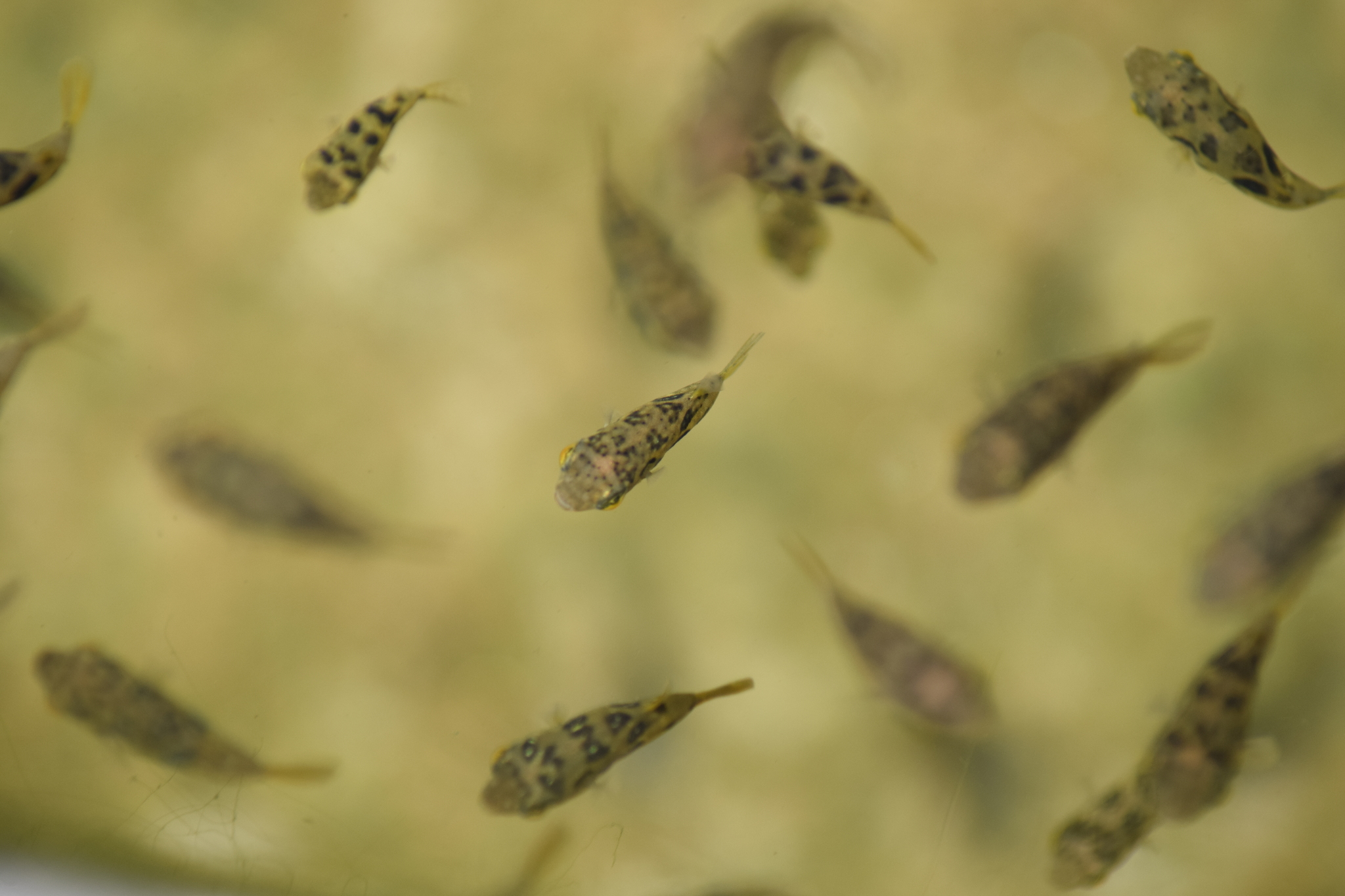
Dwarf pufferfish shoaling in the wild, seen from above

In captivity, dwarf pufferfish benefit from a varied diet and will eat small freshwater snails, shrimps, as well as foods like frozen mussel meat or other frozen shellfish. They will also readily eat live foods such as red and white mosquito larvae and other small animals they would predate in the wild. Dwarf pufferfish are commonly associated with plants in the genus Cabomba, and the presence of these plants has been shown to reduce mortality among captive specimens.

Dwarf pufferfish are a slow-swimming, demersal (bottom-dwelling) species. Unlike many pufferfish species, which are primarily solitary and potentially aggressive or territorial between conspecifics (members of the same species), dwarf pufferfish are found in large shoals, occasionally consisting of hundreds of individuals. They are found mainly during the summer months of January to May and rarely during the rainy season. Shoaling fish experience stress or weight loss when kept in solitude or in groups too small.

== Reproduction ==
In the wild, males with ripe gonads have been found during all months of the year but December and January, with the peak spawning period extending from May to August, concurring with the South-West monsoon period. Within the Pamba River, the minimum size at which half the population becomes sexually mature is approximately 1.83 cm (0.72 in). Environmental and dietary conditions may influence the maturation rate of individuals.

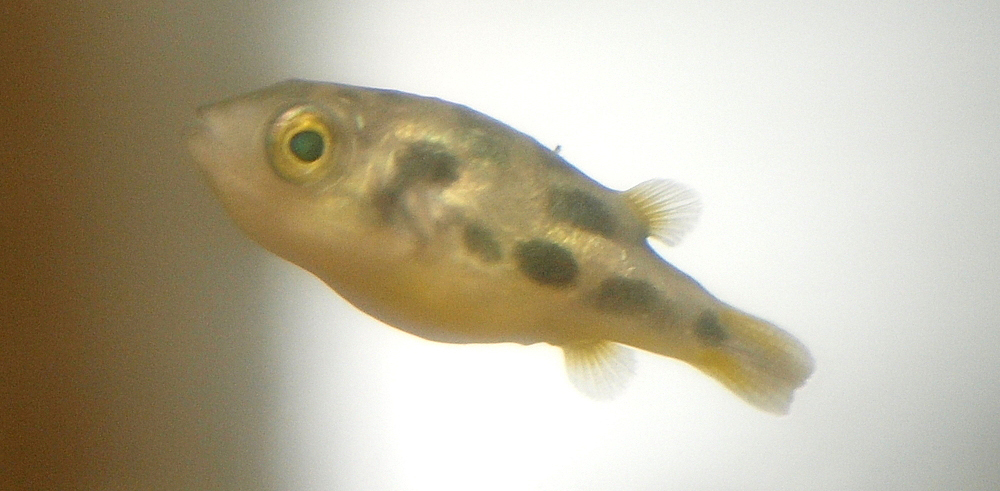
Juvenile

The mid-dorsal and mid-ventral skin ridges of males become brown in colour during the spawning season. The belly of the female will swell, and the courting male will frequently chase the female and nibble at its belly. The female will then search for a suitable location to spawn while the male chases away other males. In the aquarium, dwarf pufferfish are often plant-spawners, laying eggs in plants, including java moss, or on the substrate hidden within plants. A female will scatter approximately 1–5 eggs, 1.43 mm (0.056 in) in mean diameter. The eggs are adhesive and appear transparent and round, with a mass of small oil globules. After laying, the eggs are then fertilized externally by the male. Spawning has been observed in the evening, with the female resting on the spawning site and the male slowly approaching. After spawning, both fish will leave the site. The male will then quickly return to guard the eggs. Sneaking ejaculation by other males has also been observed. The pair may spawn multiple times in 1–4 day intervals.

Eggs hatch after five days at 27 °C (81 °F), with larvae and fry in captivity initially fed infusoria, Brachionus (a genus of rotifers), frozen bloodworms, and brine shrimp when they are a week old. There is little information on what the larvae eat in the wild. Hatched larvae are a mean of 3.15 mm (0.124 in) total length, with eyes incompletely developed and the body a red-brown. The yolk sac is consumed in four days, and the larvae commence swimming after six days, at which point their eyes are completely developed.

There is no information available on the lifespans of these fish in the wild, but aquarists report specimens live for approximately five years in captivity.

== Association with humans ==
When first described in 1941, K. Nair noted that dwarf pufferfish were a favourite of children, who would catch and use the fish as playthings. They were regarded as "frog tadpoles" by local fishermen and otherwise given little consideration. They are of no interest to fisheries, are not a food fish, and are only valued as ornamental fish in aquaria. Dwarf pufferfish have become popular as aquarium fish thanks to their attractive colours, small size, "puppy dog eyes", and relative ease of maintenance. The dwarf pufferfish is also one of the few aquarium fish to regularly eat small, live snails and thus can be helpful in controlling snail populations.
