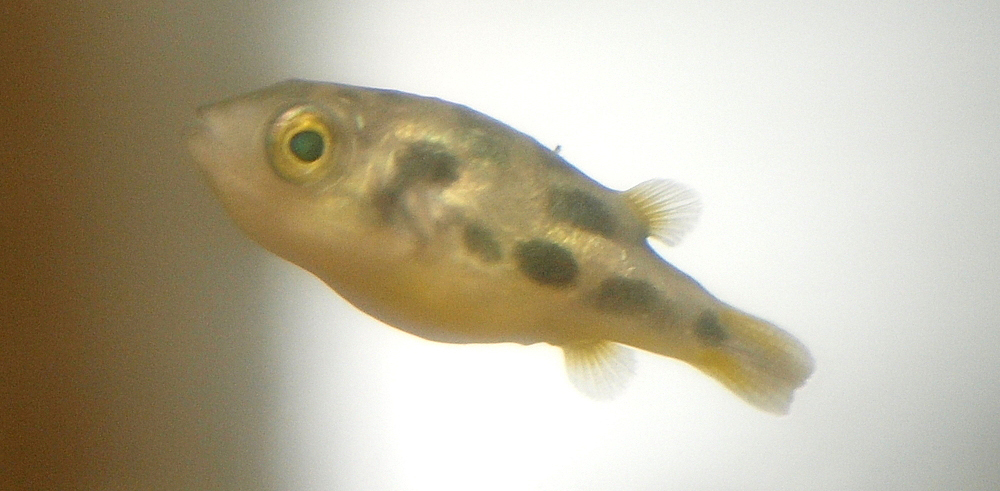
- Juvenile dwarf pufferfish (C. travancoricus)

Scientific classification
- Kingdom: Animalia
- Phylum: Chordata
- Class: Actinopterygii
- Division: Teleostei
- Order: Tetraodontiformes
- Family: Tetraodontidae
- Subfamily: Tetraodontinae
- Genus: Carinotetraodon; Benl, 1957

Species
- 6, see text.
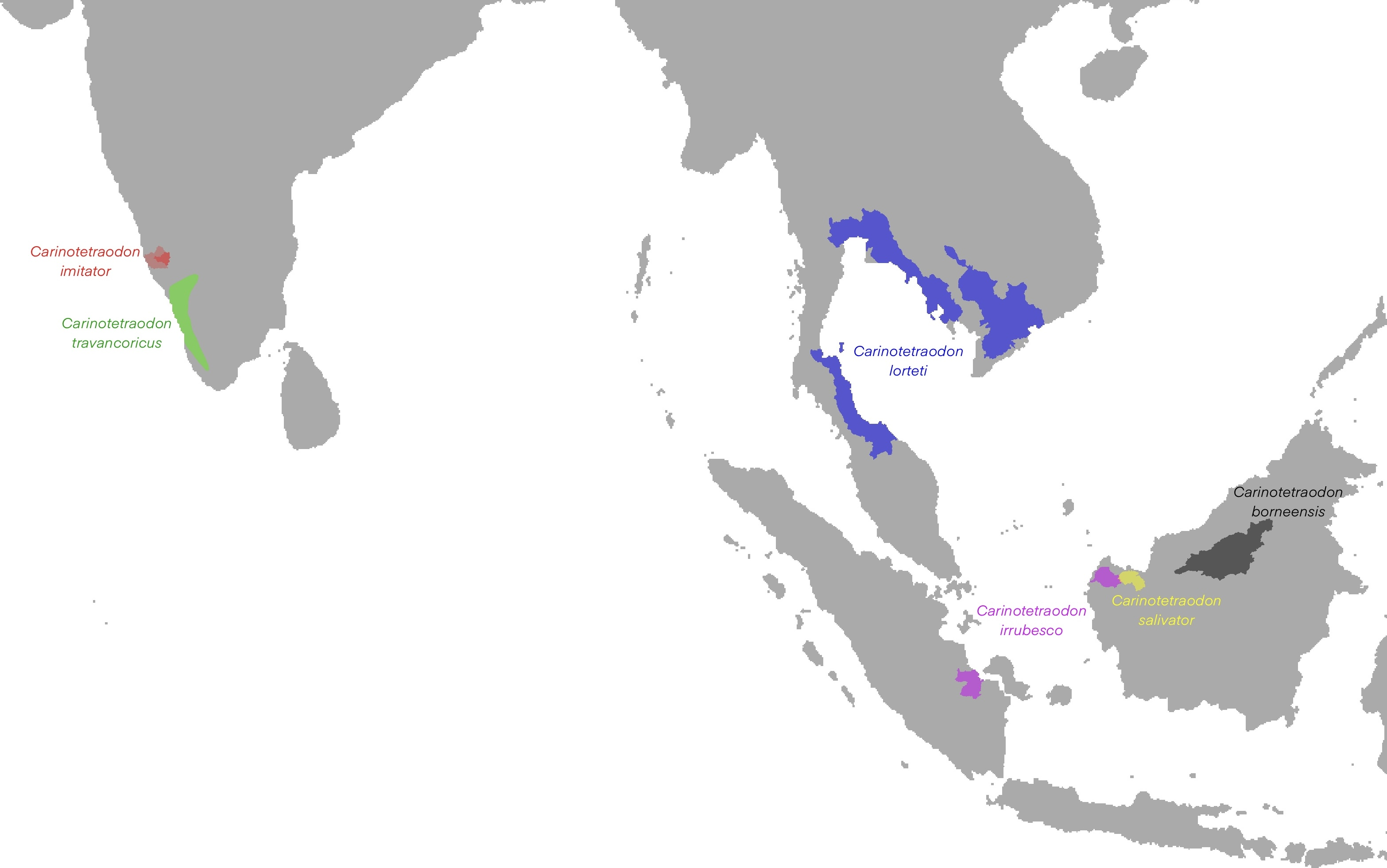

= Carinotetraodon =

Genus of fishes

Carinotetraodon is a polyphyletic genus of small freshwater pufferfish found in South and Southeast Asia. Several species have commercial importance as aquarium fish.

== Taxonomy ==
The following cladogram is based on molecular evidence and demonstrates the polyphyletic nature of the genus Carinotetraodon. A polyphyletic genus is one in which members share common characteristics, but do not necessarily share an immediate common ancestor, and their placement is based on these shared traits rather than more rigorous phylogenetic analyses. "Carinotetraodon" is represented in quotation marks to signify its polyphyletic status. Freshwater species are denoted with "FW". The cladogram is incomplete due to the absence of species like C. imitator, which have not undergone mitogenome analyses.

- Tetraodontidae
  - - - Auriglobus modestus
      - - Leiodon cutcutia^{FW}
        - - - "Carinotetraodon" salivator^{FW}
            - - "Carinotetraodon" lorteti^{FW}
              - "Carinotetraodon" irrubesco^{FW}
          - - Pao palembangensis^{FW}
            - Pao cochinchinensis^{FW}
    - - - - "Carinotetraodon" travancoricus^{FW}
        - - - Dichotomyctere nigroviridis
            - Dichotomyctere ocellatus
      - - - Pelagocephalus marki
        - - - Canthigaster coronata
            - - Canthigaster rivulata
              - - Canthigaster jactator
                - Canthigaster valentini
    - - - - Chelonodon pleurospilus
        - - Chelonodon patoca
      - - - Tetraodon miurus^{FW}
        - - Tetraodon mbu^{FW}

== Species ==
There are 6 recognized species in the genus:

- Carinotetraodon borneensis (Regan, 1903) (Bornean red-eye puffer)
- Carinotetraodon imitator Britz & Kottelat, 1999 (Dwarf malabar puffer)
- Carinotetraodon irrubesco H. H. Tan, 1999 (Red-tail dwarf puffer)
- Carinotetraodon lorteti (Tirant, 1885) (Somphong's puffer, Redeye puffer or Crested puffer)
- Carinotetraodon salivator K. K. P. Lim & Kottelat, 1995 (Striped red-eye puffer)
- Carinotetraodon travancoricus (Hora & K. K. Nair, 1941) (Malabar pufferfish, Dwarf pufferfish, Pea pufferfish)
