= Pao suvattii =

Conservation status
- Least Concern (IUCN 3.1)

Scientific classification
- Kingdom: Animalia
- Phylum: Chordata
- Class: Actinopterygii
- Order: Tetraodontiformes
- Family: Tetraodontidae
- Genus: Pao
- Species: P. suvattii

Binomial name
- Pao suvattii (Sontirat, 1989)

Synonyms
- Tetraodon suvattii Sontirat, 1989; Monotrete suvattii (Sontirat, 1989)

Species of fish

Pao suvattii, or arrowhead puffer, is a species of pufferfish. It is a medium-sized pufferfish, reaching 11.5 cm (4.5 in) SL. It is also known as pignose puffer or a Mekong puffer. It is locally common in the Lower Mekong basin, and is exclusively a freshwater fish.

The specific name honours Thai ichthyologist Chote Suvatti, former professor of Kasetsart University, who collected the type specimen at Mekong.

== In captivity ==
P. suvattii is among the most aggressive of puffers in captivity. Just Like their saltwater cousins,P. suvatti contains tetrodotoxin within their skin, organs and teeth. Normally when P. suvatti are kept as pets they must be kept in an aquarium by themselves as they have a tendency to always be aggressive and hungry, unless they are well-fed, and thus they will nibble on the other fish's tails, and occasionally will make a meal of the other fish. Because of P. suvattii's eating habits, it should normally only be fed every other day. During a feeding P. suvattii will shoot up to the surface and guzzle down large amounts of food causing it to double in size. The arrowhead puffer can be purchased at most pet stores that carry exotic fishes for around 120–180 USD. Basic care would include the feeding of live fish, gut-loaded ghost shrimp, crayfish, and perhaps raw shrimp or mussels. Never overfeed the fish or give it red meat or chicken as this can lead to fatty liver disease, which is usually fatal. For a single species aquarium this fish would make a great pet, and they have been known to live up to 10 years in a well-maintained aquarium - which, as with all puffers, means water changes of 50% each week, with good water movement and absolutely no ammonia or nitrites, and minimal nitrates. this puffer species can also be aggressive towards humans. It's a dangerous pufferfish which has a tendency to bite humans with its sharp four teeth, fused together like a beak. They may attack humans by biting them when threatened. So in the wild and in aquarium, it's a dangerous fish which are both aggressive against both humans and other aquarium fishes. However, it's not as aggressive and dangerous towards humans as Feroxodon multistriatus aka the ferocious puffer and Fang's puffer (P. cochinchinensis)
