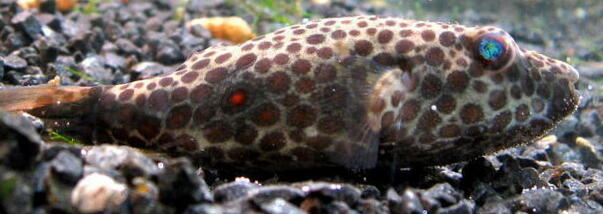

Conservation status
- Least Concern (IUCN 3.1)

Scientific classification
- Kingdom: Animalia
- Phylum: Chordata
- Class: Actinopterygii
- Order: Tetraodontiformes
- Family: Tetraodontidae
- Genus: Pao
- Species: P. abei

Binomial name
- Pao abei (T. R. Roberts, 1998)

Synonyms
- Tetraodon abei T. R. Roberts, 1998; Monotrete abei (T. R. Roberts, 1998)

= Pao abei =

Species of fish

Pao abei is a species of freshwater pufferfish from the Mekong, Chao Phraya and Mae Klong river basins in Southeast Asia. It is named after Japanese ichthyologist Tokiharu Abe.

They are molluscivores, using the beak-like teeth to break open the shell of the prey. They are also opportunistic piscivores.

Maximum length is 10.3 centimetres (4.1 in) SL. Numerous pale spots are uniformly distributed over a dark background. The spots are orange in certain live specimens.

In the aquarium this fish is very aggressive and territorial.

They are closely related to Pao leiurus.
