= Pao barbatus =

Scientific classification
- Kingdom: Animalia
- Phylum: Chordata
- Class: Actinopterygii
- Order: Tetraodontiformes
- Family: Tetraodontidae
- Genus: Pao
- Species: P. barbatus

Binomial name
- Pao barbatus (Roberts, 1998)

Synonyms
- Tetraodon barbatus

Species of fish

Pao barbatus is a species of freshwater pufferfish found in the Mekong River in southeast Asia.

It is closely related to Tetraodon (Pao) cambodgiensis and was generally considered a junior synonym of that species until 2013. In the same year its species group was moved from the genus Tetraodon to Pao.
