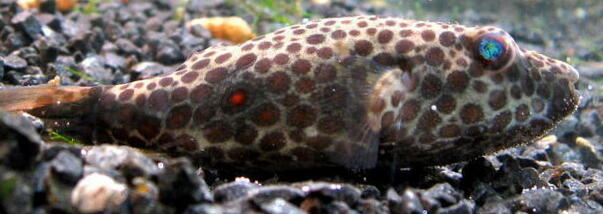
- Pao abei

Scientific classification
- Kingdom: Animalia
- Phylum: Chordata
- Class: Actinopterygii
- Order: Tetraodontiformes
- Family: Tetraodontidae
- Subfamily: Tetraodontinae
- Genus: Pao; Kottelat, 2013

Type species
- Tetraodon leiurus Bleeker, 1850

Synonyms
- Monotrete

= Pao (fish) =

Genus of fishes

Pao is a genus of mostly freshwater pufferfish with one species (P. leiurus) also occurring in brackish water. They are found in Southeast Asia. Until 2013, its species were generally placed in Tetraodon.

== Species ==
There are currently 15 recognized species in this genus:

- Pao abei (T. R. Roberts, 1998)
- Pao baileyi (Sontirat, 1989) (Hairy puffer)
- Pao barbatus (Roberts, 1998)
- Pao bergii (Popta, 1905)
- Pao brevirostris (Benl, 1957)
- Pao cambodgiensis (Chabanaud, 1923)
- Pao cochinchinensis (Steindachner, 1866)
- Pao fangi (Pellegrin & Chevey, 1940)
- Pao hilgendorfii (Popta, 1905)
- Pao leiurus (Bleeker, 1850)
- Pao ocellaris (Klausewitz, 1957)
- Pao palembangensis (Bleeker, 1852)
- Pao palustris (Saenjundaeng, Vidthayanon & Grudpun, 2013)
- Pao suvattii (Sontirat, 1989)
- Pao turgidus (Kottelat, 2000)

The following cladogram is based on a 2013 analysis of Tetraodontid mitogenomes:

- Auriglobus
- - Leiodon
  - - Carinotetraodon
    - Pao
      - Pao palembangensis
      - - - Pao leiurus
          - - Pao abei
            - Pao baileyi
        - - - Pao cochinchinensis
            - Pao suvattii
          - - Pao turgidus
            - Pao cochinchinensis
