= Chote Suvatti =

Thai ichthyologist

- โชติ สุวัตถิ
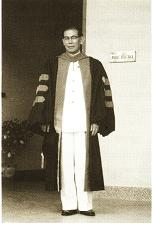
- Chote Suvatti
- Born: 24 February 1905
- Died: 1991
- Title: Professor

Academic work
- Discipline: Ichthyology
- Institutions: Kasetsart University
- Notable works: Fishes of Thailand

Chote Suvatti (Thai: โชติ สุวัตถิ, RTGS: Chot Suwat; 24 February 1905 – 1991) was a Thai ichthyologist. He worked at the Department of Fisheries during its foundational years and later became a professor at Kasetsart University as well as the dean of its Faculty of Fisheries. Early in his career, he served as an assistant to H.M. Smith, conducting surveys of fish species throughout Thailand. He is best known for his seminal work, Fishes of Thailand, which documented 1,184 fish species and introduced the science of taxonomy into university curricula across the country. In addition, he was appointed to serve on the committee that revised the Royal Institute Dictionary in 1950, helping to standardize and clarify biological terminology.

== Eponymous species ==
- Arrowhead puffer, Pao suvattii (Sontirat, 1989)
- Hypsibarbus suvattii (Rainboth, 1996)
