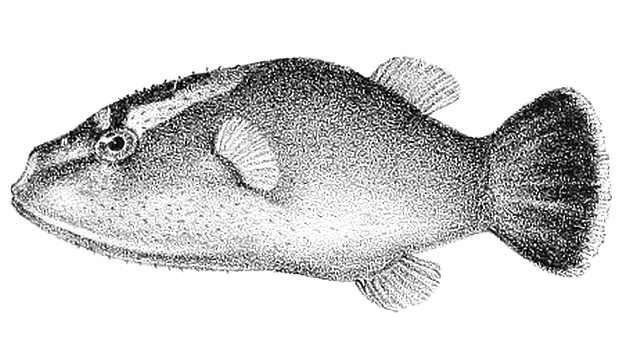

Scientific classification
- Domain: Eukaryota
- Kingdom: Animalia
- Phylum: Chordata
- Class: Actinopterygii
- Order: Tetraodontiformes
- Family: Tetraodontidae
- Genus: Carinotetraodon
- Species: C. borneensis

Binomial name
- Carinotetraodon borneensis (Regan, 1903)
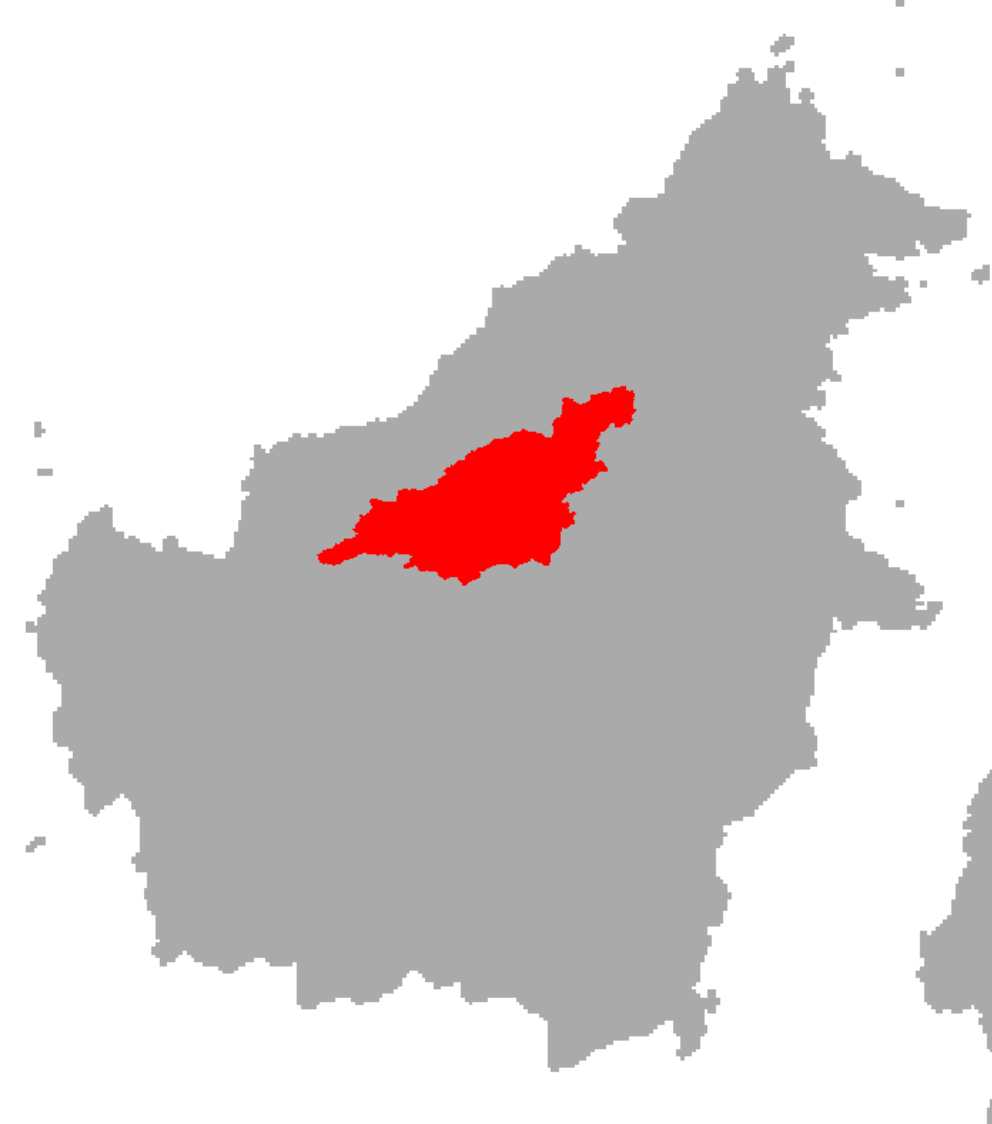

Synonyms
- Tetrodon borneensis

= Carinotetraodon borneensis =

Species of fish

Carinotetraodon borneensis, sometimes known as the Bornean red-eye puffer, is a species of pufferfish in the family Tetraodontidae. It is a tropical freshwater species known only from southern Sarawak, Malaysia. It reaches 4.4 cm (1.7 inches) SL and is sometimes seen in the aquarium trade.
