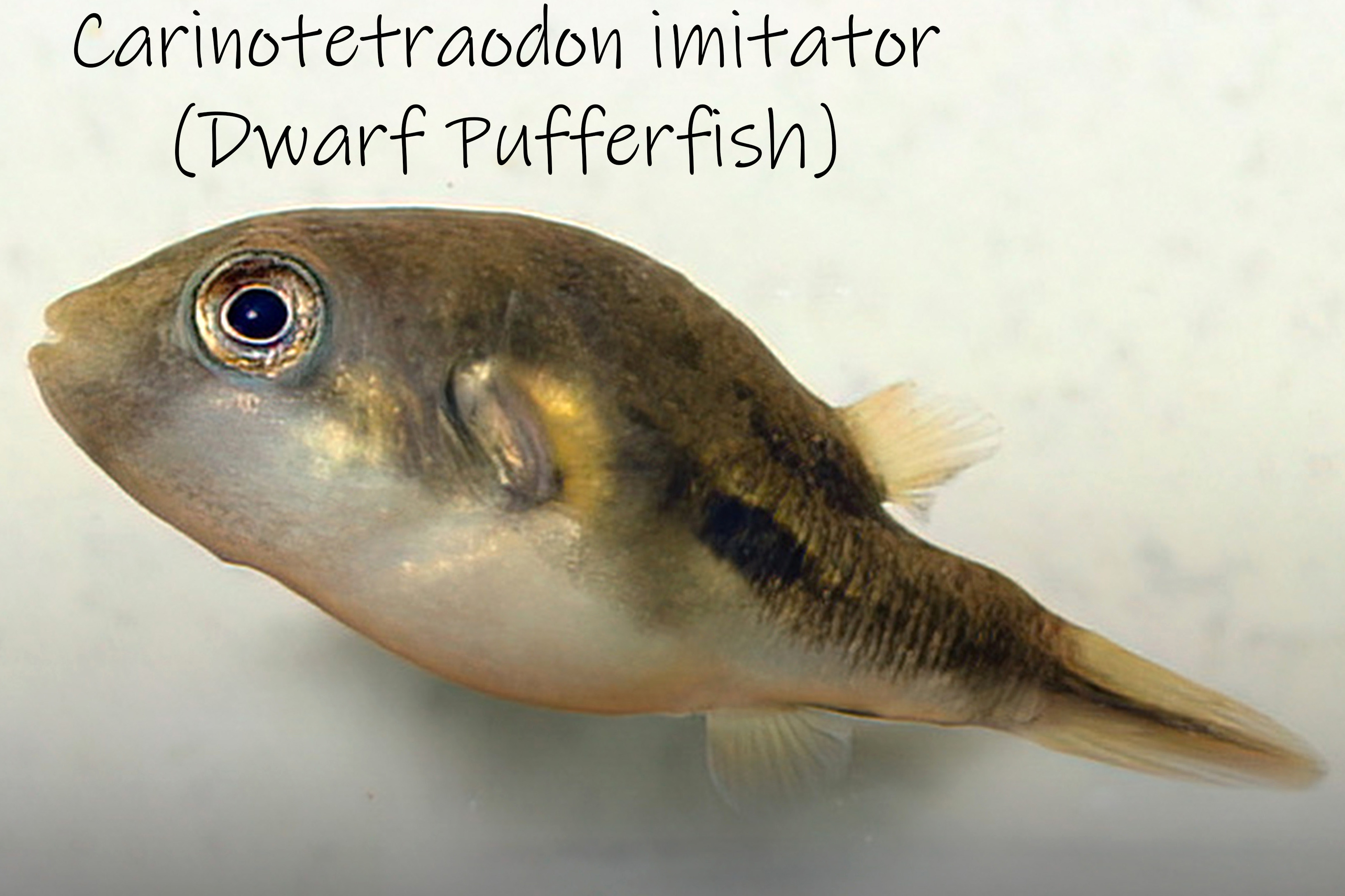

Conservation status
- Data Deficient (IUCN 3.1)

Scientific classification
- Kingdom: Animalia
- Phylum: Chordata
- Class: Actinopterygii
- Order: Tetraodontiformes
- Family: Tetraodontidae
- Genus: Carinotetraodon
- Species: C. imitator

Binomial name
- Carinotetraodon imitator Britz & Kottelat, 1999
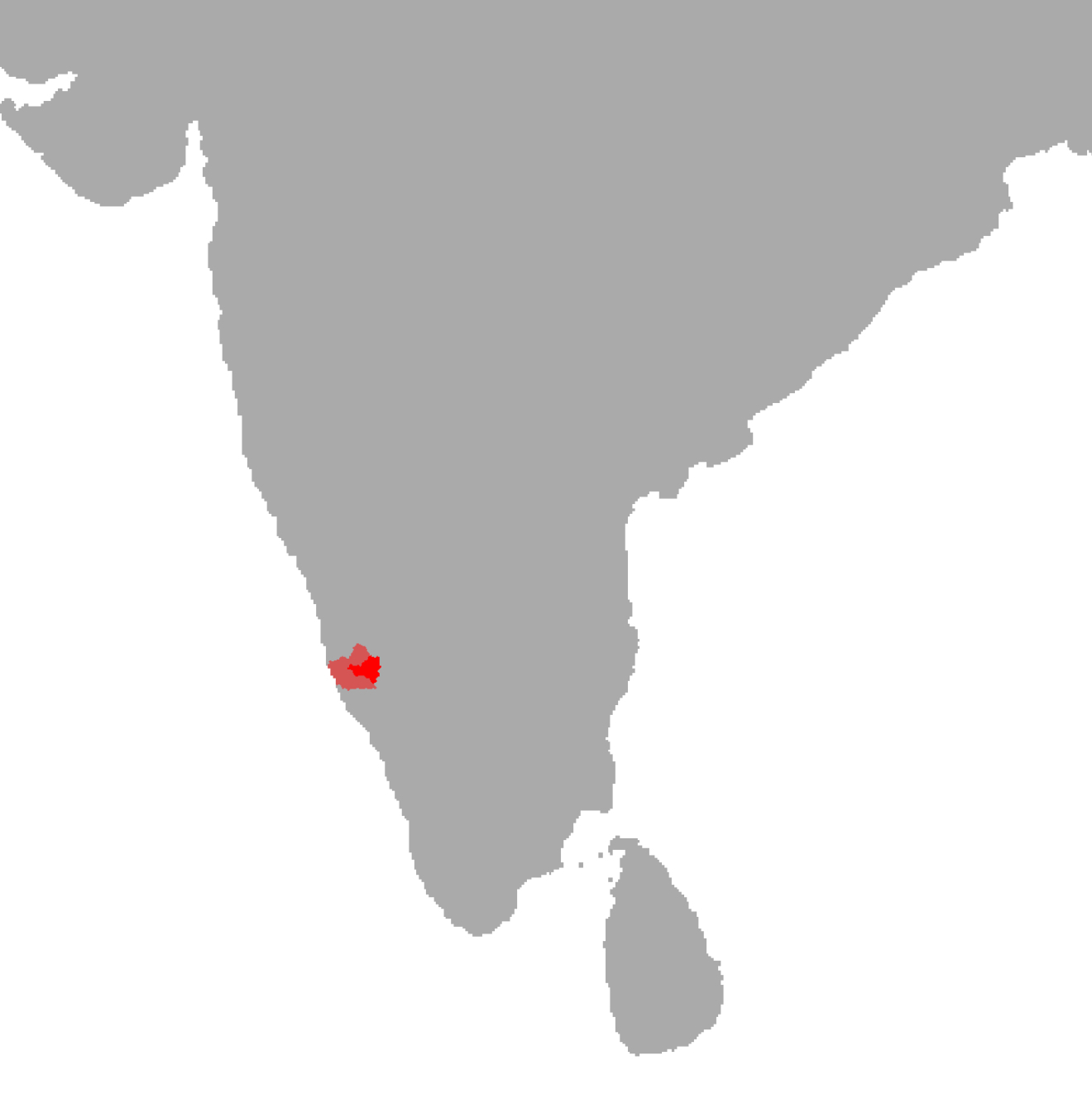

= Carinotetraodon imitator =

Species of fish

Carinotetraodon imitator, commonly known as the dwarf Malabar pufferfish, is a freshwater pufferfish found in the Western Ghats of India, with little information available on its complete distribution. It is one of the smallest pufferfish in the world, and closely resembles the related Carinotetraodon travancoricus.

== Description ==
C. imitator has a maximum recorded standard length (SL) of 2.65 cm (1.04 in), making it one of the smallest pufferfish in the world. The species is sexually dimorphic. Males have bodies and fins which are dirty yellow to orange in colour and are covered in dark blotches. The ventrum is dirty white to dirty yellow, becoming brownish toward the midventral line and forming a stripe from their lower lip to their caudal peduncle, surrounding the anal fin, where the stripe is broader and darker. An erectable skin keel along the ventral and dorsal surfaces is present in males. Females also possess the dark spots and blotches. The body of females is light brown to beige with a white ventrum. They lack the midventral stripe, but the area around their anal fin is darker and sometimes extends as a short stripe to the lower half of the caudal fin base. The patterns and colouration varies between individuals of both sexes, and their dark spots may be conspicuous or faint or broken into several smaller spots.

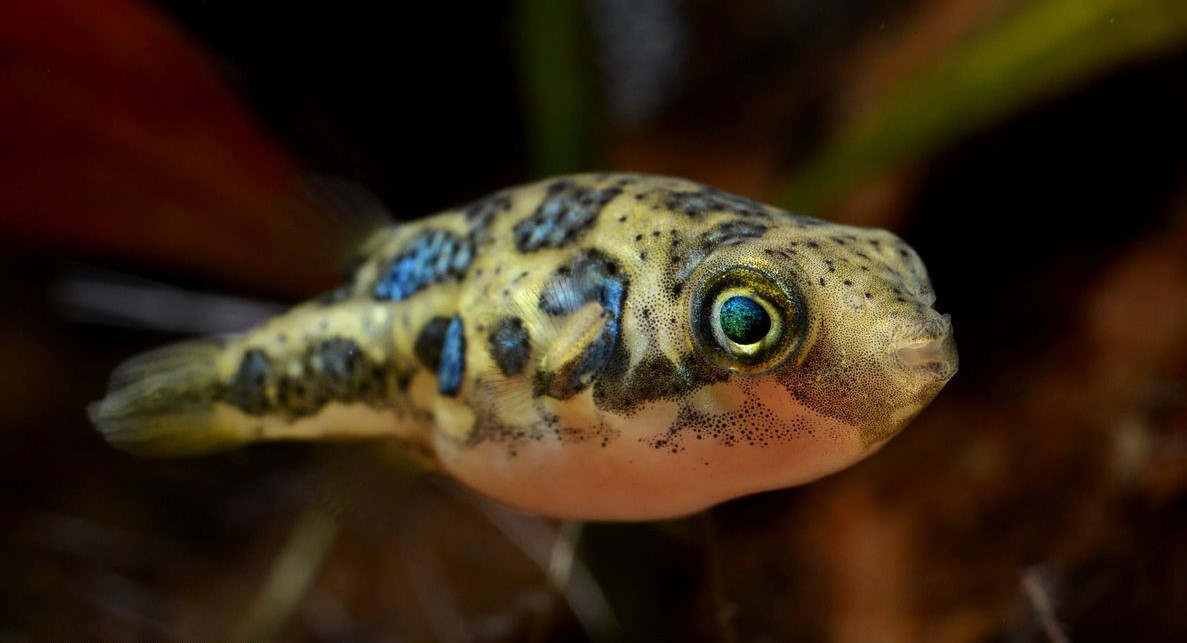
C. imitator closely resembles C. travancoricus (pictured)

=== Distinguishing from Carinotetraodon travancoricus ===
C. imitator can be distinguished from its congener, as the males have brighter yellow colouration and have smaller, faint blotches compared to males of C. travancoricus, and lack the iridescent blue lines behind the eye. Females have smaller and fainter body blotches than C. travancoricus females, in addition to a number of small spots, though females of C. tranvancoricus may also have small spots between their larger, darker blotches. The most notable difference, however, is the body spination, which is greatly reduced in C. imitator compared to C travancoricus.

== Distribution and habitat ==
In 1999, the species was first described based on specimens in an aquarium in Germany. Information gathered through the importer from the exporter indicated that the species originated in India, and was found in small rivers in Kochi, probably from Ernakulam and neighbouring districts. The specimens were being kept with a number of C. tranvancoricus, suggesting either the two species occur together, or were later mixed by collectors or exporters. They have since been found in mid- and lowland reaches of Kumaradhara and Addahole, Netravati River basin in Karnataka, as well as shallow streams. They inhabit bodies of water with sand, gravel, or stones making up the substrate. There is no information on its complete distribution.

== Reproduction ==
Reproduction of C. imitator has been observed only in captivity. During observation, the water was kept slightly brackish, with 10 L (2.6 US gal) of sea water per 60 L (16 US gal) of freshwater, and its temperature fluctuated between 20–24 °C (68–75 °F). During courting, males erect their keels and their bodies become bright yellow to orange and without marks. They court females while chasing away other males. Males attempted to attract females to the spawning site by swimming back and forth between the female and the site, sometimes trying to push the female toward the spawning site. Females ready to spawn would follow the male to the site, and spawning occurred in java moss. The female and male pressed their bodies together, both in a half-circle, and the female would release one or two eggs during the bout. Pairs may have up to ten or more bouts per spawning sequence. No parental care or fanning was observed outside of the male's defense of the spawning territory. When researchers attempted to recover eggs, they were never able to collect more than ten per spawning sequence, suggesting conspecifics may engage in egg cannibalism and were successful, despite the guarding male.

Eggs are approximately 1.6 mm (0.063 in) in diameter. They are round and have a micropyle at the tip of a wart-like protrusion. They possess no obvious adhesiveness. Eggs were seen to hatch after seven days at 22–24 °C (72–75 °F). Hatched larvae are 3.5 mm (0.14 in) long. They are brownish with two translucent vertical bands, one behind the yolk sac and one at the end of the caudal fin. With the use of adhesive cells along the ventral yolk sac, larvae are able to attach themselves to substrate.

== Conservation status ==
The species is listed as data deficient on the IUCN Red List, as it is one of the least known freshwater fish of the Western Ghats and may be "a very rare species". There is little or no information available on its complete distribution, population, biology, or threats. However, this fish is widely available internationally in the aquarium trade, indicating local exporters may have more knowledge. Overharvesting for the aquarium trade is a potential threat to the species.
