= Pao hilgendorfii =

Scientific classification
- Kingdom: Animalia
- Phylum: Chordata
- Class: Actinopterygii
- Order: Tetraodontiformes
- Family: Tetraodontidae
- Genus: Pao
- Species: P. hilgendorfii

Binomial name
- Pao hilgendorfii (Popta, 1905)

Synonyms
- Tetraodon hilgendorfii; Tetrodon hilgendorfii

Species of pufferfish

Pao hilgendorfii, sometimes known as Hilgendorf's puffer, is a species of pufferfish in the family Tetraodontidae. It is a tropical freshwater species native to the Mahakam basin in Borneo. The species was originally described as a member of Tetraodon but was moved to the then-new genus Pao in 2013.
