= Pao bergii =

Conservation status
- Data Deficient (IUCN 3.1)

Scientific classification
- Kingdom: Animalia
- Phylum: Chordata
- Class: Actinopterygii
- Order: Tetraodontiformes
- Family: Tetraodontidae
- Genus: Pao
- Species: P. bergii

Binomial name
- Pao bergii (Popta, 1905)

Synonyms
- Tetrodon bergii Popta, 1905

Species of puffer fish from Indonesia

Pao bergii is a species of pufferfish in the family Tetraodontidae. It is a tropical freshwater fish native to the Kapuas River drainage of Borneo in Kalimantan (Indonesia).
