= Hypsibarbus birtwistlei =

Conservation status
- Data Deficient (IUCN 3.1)

Scientific classification
- Kingdom: Animalia
- Phylum: Chordata
- Class: Actinopterygii
- Order: Cypriniformes
- Family: Cyprinidae
- Genus: Hypsibarbus
- Species: H. birtwistlei

Binomial name
- Hypsibarbus birtwistlei (Herre, 1940)

Synonyms
- Puntius birtwistlei Herre, 1940; Poropuntius birtwistlei (Herre, 1940)

Species of fish

Hypsibarbus birtwistlei is a species of ray-finned fish belonging to the family Cyprinidae, the family which includes the carps, barbs, minnows and related fishes. This fish is found in forest streams and rivers in Peninsular Malaysia and Sumatra.
