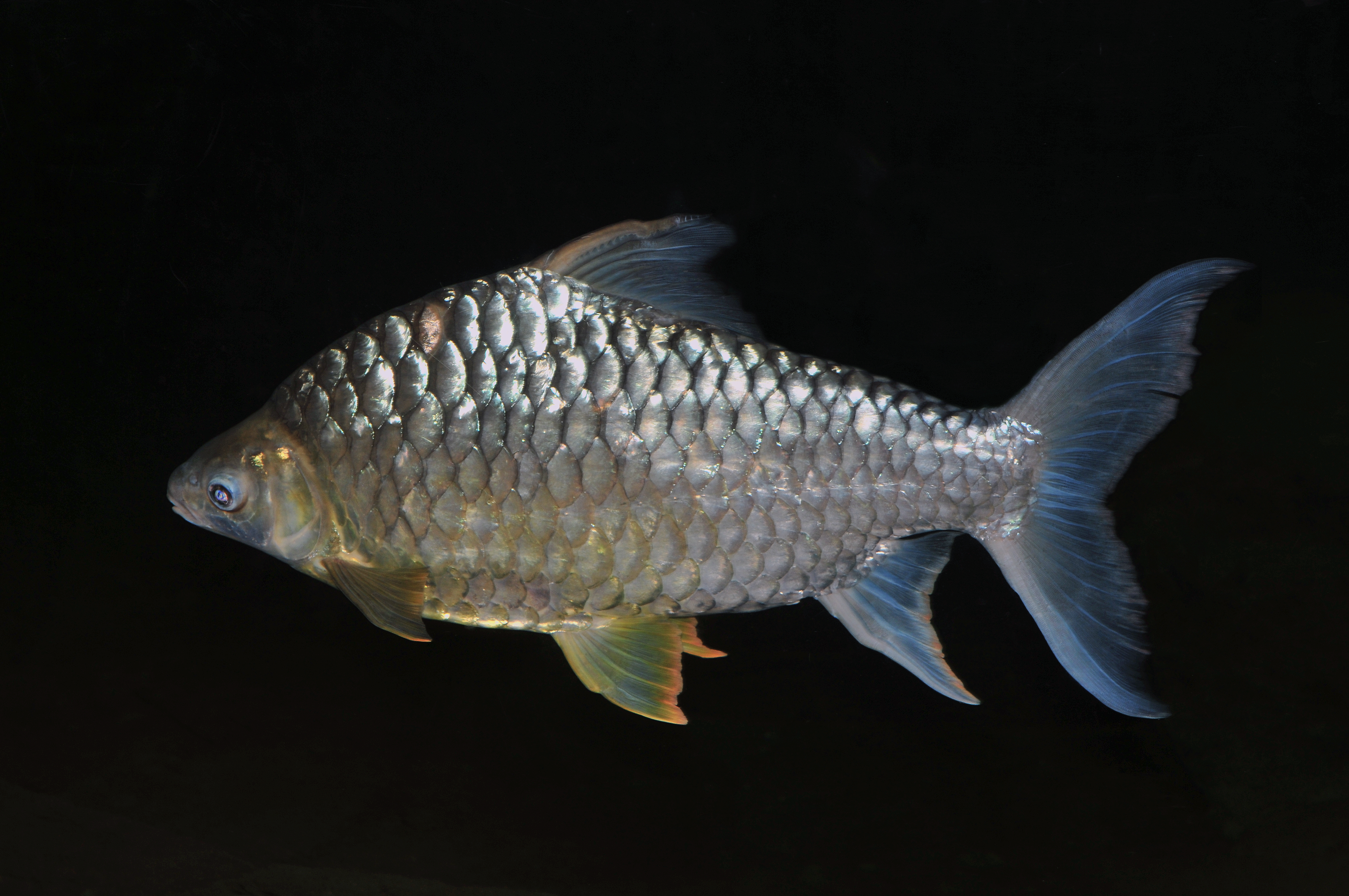

Conservation status
- Data Deficient (IUCN 3.1)

Scientific classification
- Kingdom: Animalia
- Phylum: Chordata
- Class: Actinopterygii
- Order: Cypriniformes
- Family: Cyprinidae
- Genus: Hypsibarbus
- Species: H. pierrei

Binomial name
- Hypsibarbus pierrei (Sauvage, 1880)

Synonyms
- Puntius pierrei Sauvage, 1880; Barbodes pierrei (Sauvage, 1880); Barbus pierrei (Sauvage, 1880)

= Hypsibarbus pierrei =

Species of fish

Hypsibarbus pierrei is a species of freshwater ray-finned fish in the genus Hypsibarbus native to rivers in Mainland Southeast Asia.
