= Pao ocellaris =

Conservation status
- Least Concern (IUCN 3.1)

Scientific classification
- Kingdom: Animalia
- Phylum: Chordata
- Class: Actinopterygii
- Order: Tetraodontiformes
- Family: Tetraodontidae
- Genus: Pao
- Species: P. ocellaris

Binomial name
- Pao ocellaris (Klausewitz, 1957)

Synonyms
- Tetraodon ocellaris Klausewitz 1957

Species of fish

Pao ocellaris is a species of pufferfish in the family Tetraodontidae. It is a tropical freshwater species native to Asia, where it is known from the Mae Klong River in Thailand to the lower Mekong basin in Cambodia, Vietnam, and Laos. It was included in the genus Tetraodon until 2013.
