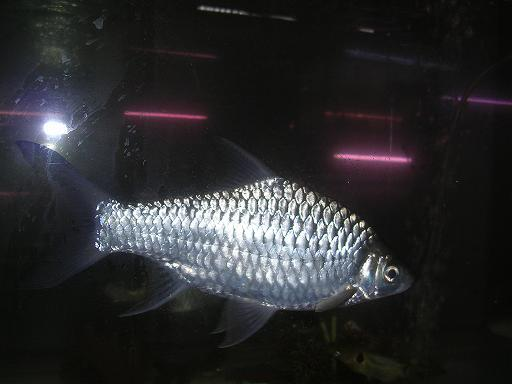

Conservation status
- Least Concern (IUCN 3.1)

Scientific classification
- Kingdom: Animalia
- Phylum: Chordata
- Class: Actinopterygii
- Order: Cypriniformes
- Family: Cyprinidae
- Genus: Hypsibarbus
- Species: H. salweenensis

Binomial name
- Hypsibarbus salweenensis Rainboth, 1996

= Hypsibarbus salweenensis =

Species of fish

Hypsibarbus salweenensis is a species of ray-finned fish in the genus Hypsibarbus which is endemic to the Salween River system in Myanmar and Thailand.
