= Hypsibarbus lagleri =

Conservation status
- Vulnerable (IUCN 3.1)

Scientific classification
- Kingdom: Animalia
- Phylum: Chordata
- Class: Actinopterygii
- Order: Cypriniformes
- Family: Cyprinidae
- Genus: Hypsibarbus
- Species: H. lagleri

Binomial name
- Hypsibarbus lagleri Rainboth, 1996

Species of fish

Hypsibarbus lagleri is a species of ray-finned fish in the genus Hypsibarbus which is endemic to the middle Mekong basin in Cambodia, Laos and Thailand. It is fished for as a food fish and marketed fresh.

Hypsibarbus lagleri has 8 soft rays I its dorsal fin and 5 in its anal fin. It has a very compressed body with an upper transverse scale count of 6. The fins are colourless. It has a gill raker count of 9–10 on the lower arm of first gill arch and there are 5 horizontal scale rows between the lateral line and the mid-dorsal scale row at the origin of the dorsal-fin. It can grow to up to 40 cm in length.

This species can be found in large rivers during the dry season and migrates into medium-sized rivers during the monsoon. It prefers clear water where it occurs in the midwater to bottom depths. This species possibly moves into flooded forest habitats immediately adjacent to rivers, but it avoids substrates consisting of fine-grained sediments, preferring rocky substrates instead. It does not seem to do well in impoundments. Feeds on zooplankton, worms and algae. Hypsibarbus lagleri migrates up the Mekong River in January–February, then moves back downstream into the lower basin where the Sesan, Srepok, and Sekong enter the Mekong in June–July.

Hypsibarbus lagleri is classified as Vulnerable by the IUCN and is threatened by overfishing as it is subjected to both commercial and subsistence fisheries, it is also threatened by dams which are planned for the Mekong, Sesan, Srepok, and Sekong.

The specific name lagleri commemorates the American ichthyologist Karl F. Lagler (1912-1985), who directed and organised studies of the fisheries in the Mekong Basin and many of the specimens used in Rainboth's study of the genus Hypsibarbus were collected during Lagler's studies.
