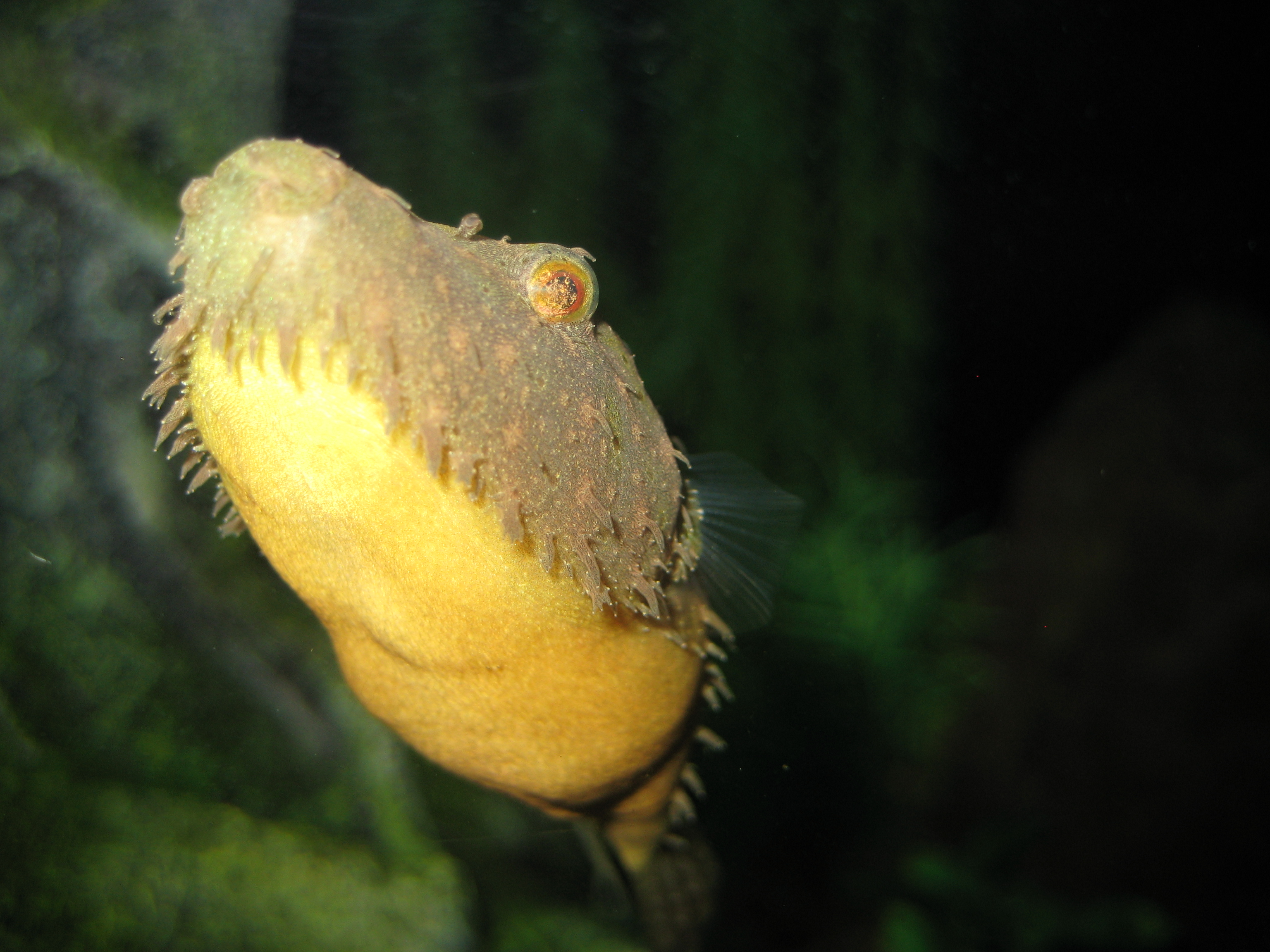

Conservation status
- Least Concern (IUCN 3.1)

Scientific classification
- Kingdom: Animalia
- Phylum: Chordata
- Class: Actinopterygii
- Division: Teleostei
- Order: Tetraodontiformes
- Family: Tetraodontidae
- Genus: Pao
- Species: P. baileyi

Binomial name
- Pao baileyi (Sontirat, 1989)

Synonyms
- Tetraodon baileyi Sontirat, 1989; Monotrete baileyi (Sontirat, 1989)

= Pao baileyi =

Species of fish

Pao baileyi, the hairy pufferfish, is a species of pufferfish usually found in the rocky habitats, including rapids, of the Mekong mainstream and its larger tropical freshwater tributaries.

== Characteristics ==
P. baileyi grows to around 12 centimetres (4.7 in) SL and can be identified by the epidermal outgrowths (formally called cirri) covering its head and body. The cirri tend to be more profuse in the juvenile state, becoming reduced or non-existent as the fish gets older. The abdomen is usually golden or orange, with no markings. Like other pufferfish, P. baileyi is scaleless, and is therefore extremely sensitive to water quality.

== In Aquaria ==
P. Baileyi is occasionally seen in the aquarium industry. It is commonly fed both dead and live fish, and while it is not known to be a picky eater, it is strictly a carnivore. The fish often fetches a high price, commonly going over $100 USD.
