= Hypsibarbus suvattii =

Conservation status
- Data Deficient (IUCN 3.1)

Scientific classification
- Kingdom: Animalia
- Phylum: Chordata
- Class: Actinopterygii
- Order: Cypriniformes
- Family: Cyprinidae
- Genus: Hypsibarbus
- Species: H. suvattii

Binomial name
- Hypsibarbus suvattii Rainboth, 1996

Species of fish

Hypsibarbus suvattii is a species of ray-finned fish in the genus Hypsibarbus which has only been recorded with certainty from the Mae Klong in Thailand. It is a big-sized cyprinid, reaching 50 cm (19 in) SL, but it is rare species. The specific name honours Thai ichthyologist Chote Suvatti, former professor of Kasetsart University, who is one of the pioneers of fisheries in Thailand.

== Footnotes ==
- Froese, Rainer; Pauly, Daniel (eds.). "Hypsibarbus suvattii". FishBase.
