= Hypsibarbus oatesii =

Conservation status
- Data Deficient (IUCN 3.1)

Scientific classification
- Kingdom: Animalia
- Phylum: Chordata
- Class: Actinopterygii
- Order: Cypriniformes
- Family: Cyprinidae
- Genus: Hypsibarbus
- Species: H. oatesii

Binomial name
- Hypsibarbus oatesii (Boulenger, 1893)

Synonyms
- Barbus oatesii Boulenger, 1893

Species of fish

Hypsibarbus oatesii is a species of freshwater ray-finned fish from the carp and minnow family, the Cyprinidae. It is found in the southern Shan Hills in Myanmar in the Salween River. It is caught for food in subsistence fisheries. The specific name honours Eugene William Oates who collected the type specimen.
