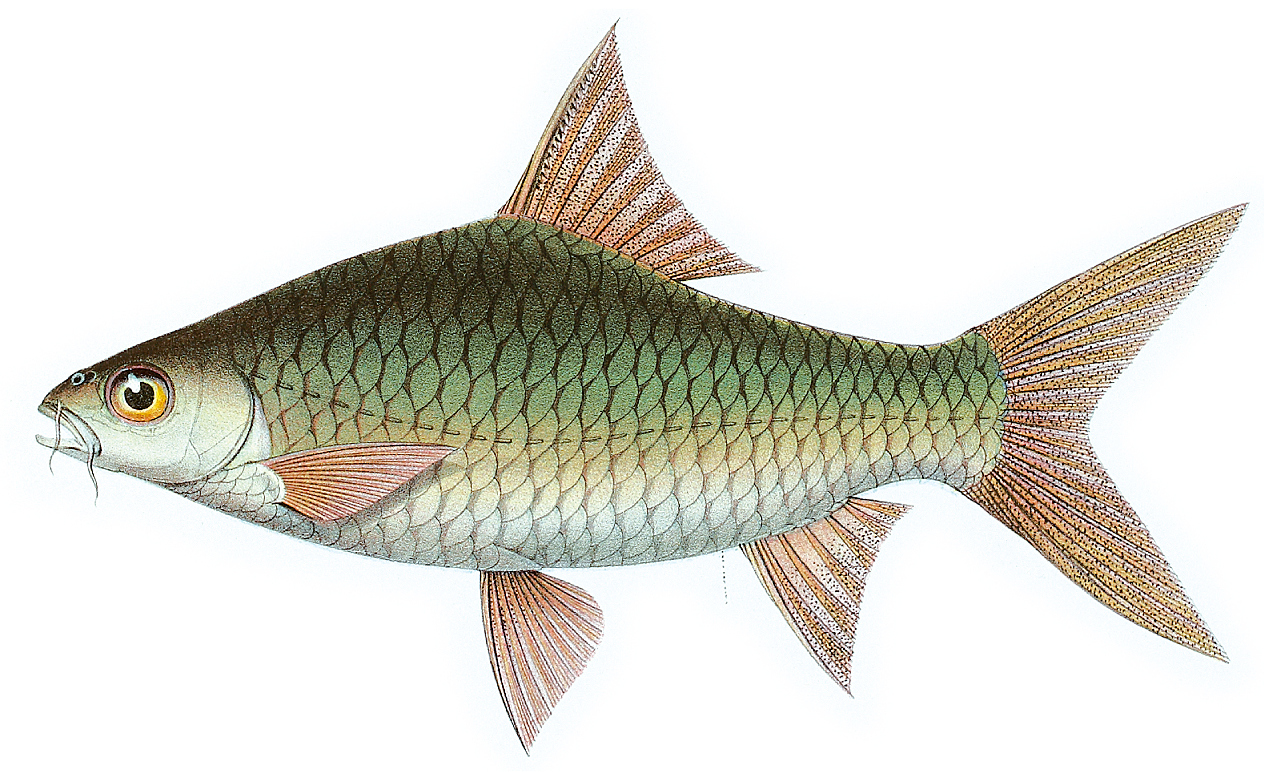

Conservation status
- Data Deficient (IUCN 3.1)

Scientific classification
- Kingdom: Animalia
- Phylum: Chordata
- Class: Actinopterygii
- Order: Cypriniformes
- Family: Cyprinidae
- Genus: Hypsibarbus
- Species: H. huguenini

Binomial name
- Hypsibarbus huguenini (Bleeker, 1853)

Synonyms
- Barbus huguenini Bleeker, 1853; Poropuntius huguenini (Bleeker, 1853); Puntius huguenini (Bleeker, 1853); Systomus huguenini (Bleeker, 1853)

= Hypsibarbus huguenini =

Species of fish

Hypsibarbus huguenini is a species of ray-finned fish belonging to the family Cyprinidae, the family which includes the carps, barbs, minnows and related fishes. This fish is endemic to Sumatra in Indonesia where it is found in the upper basin of the Indragiri River. This species has a maximum published total length of 46 cm (18 in).
