= Goldfin tinfoil barb =

Conservation status
- Least Concern (IUCN 3.1)

Scientific classification
- Kingdom: Animalia
- Phylum: Chordata
- Class: Actinopterygii
- Order: Cypriniformes
- Family: Cyprinidae
- Genus: Hypsibarbus
- Species: H. malcolmi

Binomial name
- Hypsibarbus malcolmi (Smith, 1945)

Synonyms
- Acrossocheilus malcolmi Smith, 1945; Poropuntius malcolmi (Smith, 1945)

Species of fish

Goldfin tinfoil barb (Hypsibarbus malcolmi) is a species of cyprinid fish that is found in Southeast Asia. It is native to the countries of Cambodia, Laos, Malaysia and Thailand where it is used as a food fish and in the aquarium trade.

malcolmi is named in honour of Malcolm Arthur Smith, an English herpetologist who studied reptiles and amphibians in Thailand.
