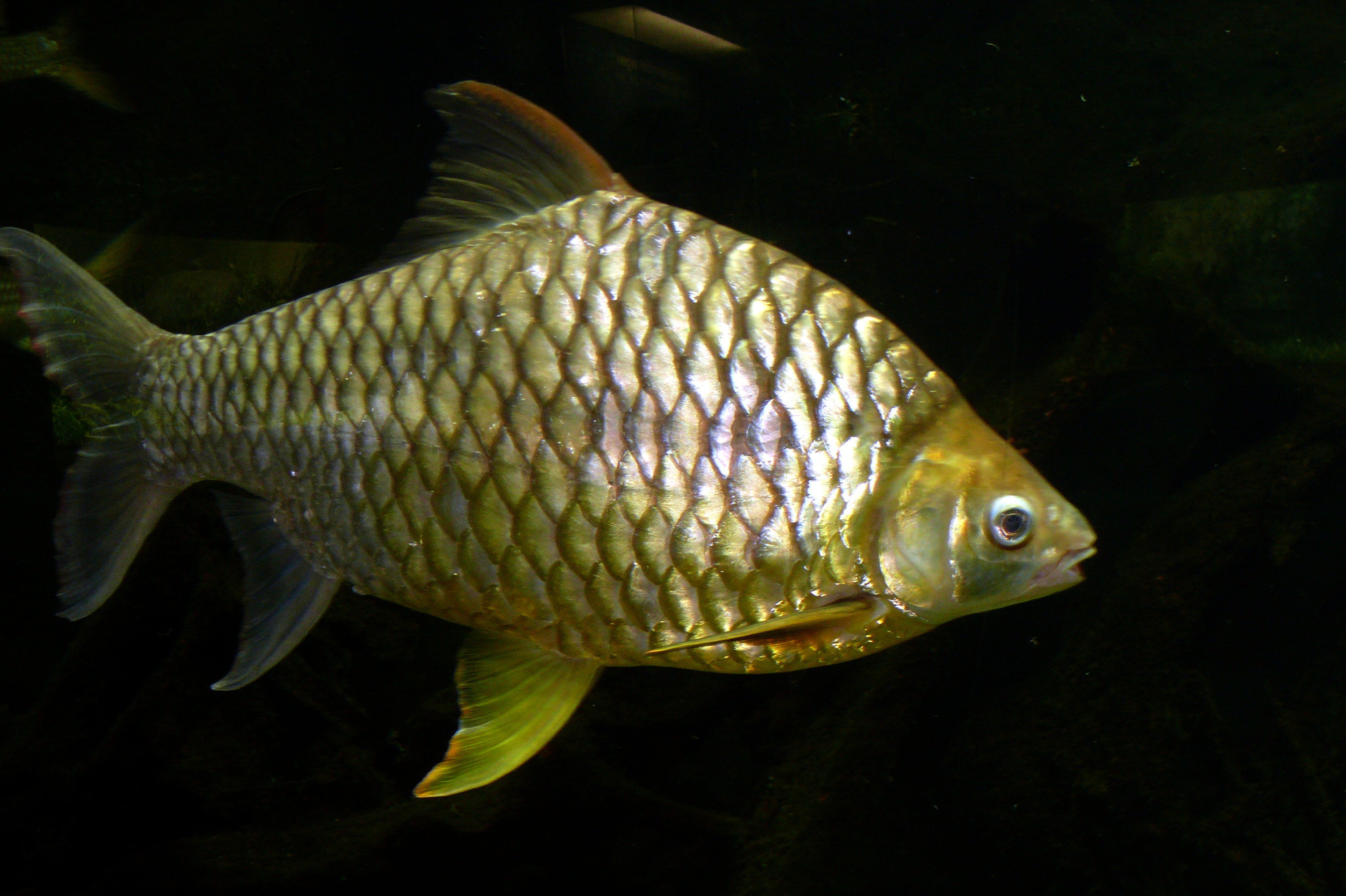

Conservation status
- Least Concern (IUCN 3.1)

Scientific classification
- Kingdom: Animalia
- Phylum: Chordata
- Class: Actinopterygii
- Order: Cypriniformes
- Family: Cyprinidae
- Genus: Hypsibarbus
- Species: H. wetmorei

Binomial name
- Hypsibarbus wetmorei (H. M. Smith, 1931)

Synonyms
- Puntius wetmorei Smith, 1931; Poropuntius wetmorei (Smith, 1931); Puntius daruphani Smith, 1934; Barbus daruphani (Smith, 1934); Barbus beasleyi Fowler, 1937; Puntius beasleyi (Fowler, 1937)

= Hypsibarbus wetmorei =

Species of fish

Hypsibarbus wetmorei, the golden belly barb, lemon fin barb, lemon barb or Kerai (often spelled as Krai) is a species of cyprinid fish. It is native to the Mae Klong, Mekong, Chao Phraya, Tapi and Pahang rivers in Mainland Southeast Asia. Although locally common and considered to be a species of Least Concern, it is threatened (at least in parts of its range) by overfishing, dams and pollution. It typically reaches 25 cm (10 in) in length, but has been recorded up to about 70 cm (2 ft 4 in).

It is popular both as a food fish and as an ornamental species, particularly in shorter-than-normal forms known as "balloon" or "Pla San" (Thai: ปลาสั้น, lit. 'shorted fish' or 'dwarf fish'). In the ornamental fish trade, it is often kept as a tank mate with larger fish such as arowanas. In Thailand, it is vernacularly known as Pla Tapak (ปลาตะพาก), Pla Tapak Lueng (ปลาตะพากเหลือง), Pla Tapak Thong (ปลาตะพากทอง), or Pla Krapak (ปลากระพาก), as mentioned in King Rama V's poem Journey to Sai Yok.

Artificial insemination has been carried out by the Kamphaeng Phet Inland Fisheries Research and Development Center since 2010, with fry released into natural water bodies for conservation purposes.
