= Pao brevirostris =

Conservation status
- Least Concern (IUCN 3.1)

Scientific classification
- Kingdom: Animalia
- Phylum: Chordata
- Class: Actinopterygii
- Order: Tetraodontiformes
- Family: Tetraodontidae
- Genus: Pao
- Species: P. brevirostris

Binomial name
- Pao brevirostris (Benl, 1957)
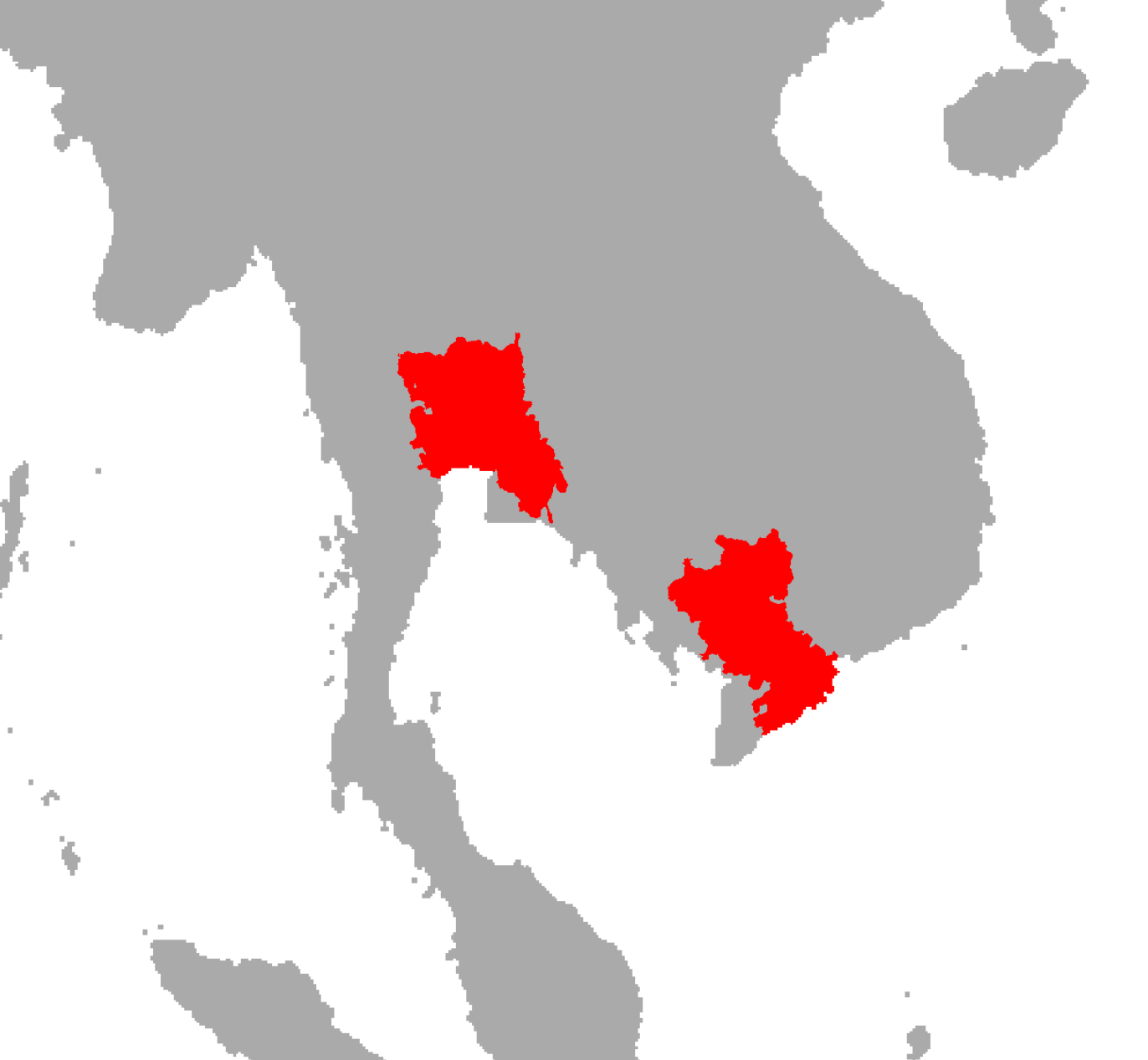

Synonyms
- Tetraodon leiurus brevirostris; Tetraodon palustris; Pao palustris

Species of pufferfish

Pao brevirostris is a species of pufferfish in the family Tetraodontidae. It is a tropical freshwater species native to Asia, where it is known from the Mekong basin and the Chao Phraya drainage. It inhabits marshes and swamps with dense aquatic plant cover, and the species is known to frequently hide between roots and among submerged foliage. It can grow to 9.5 cm (3.7 in) standard length.

In captivity, the species has been reported to eat juvenile fish, with individuals involved in a study being fed on juveniles of the species Oreochromis niloticus, Barbonymus gonionotus, Henicorhynchus siamensis, and Hypophthalmichthys molitrix.
