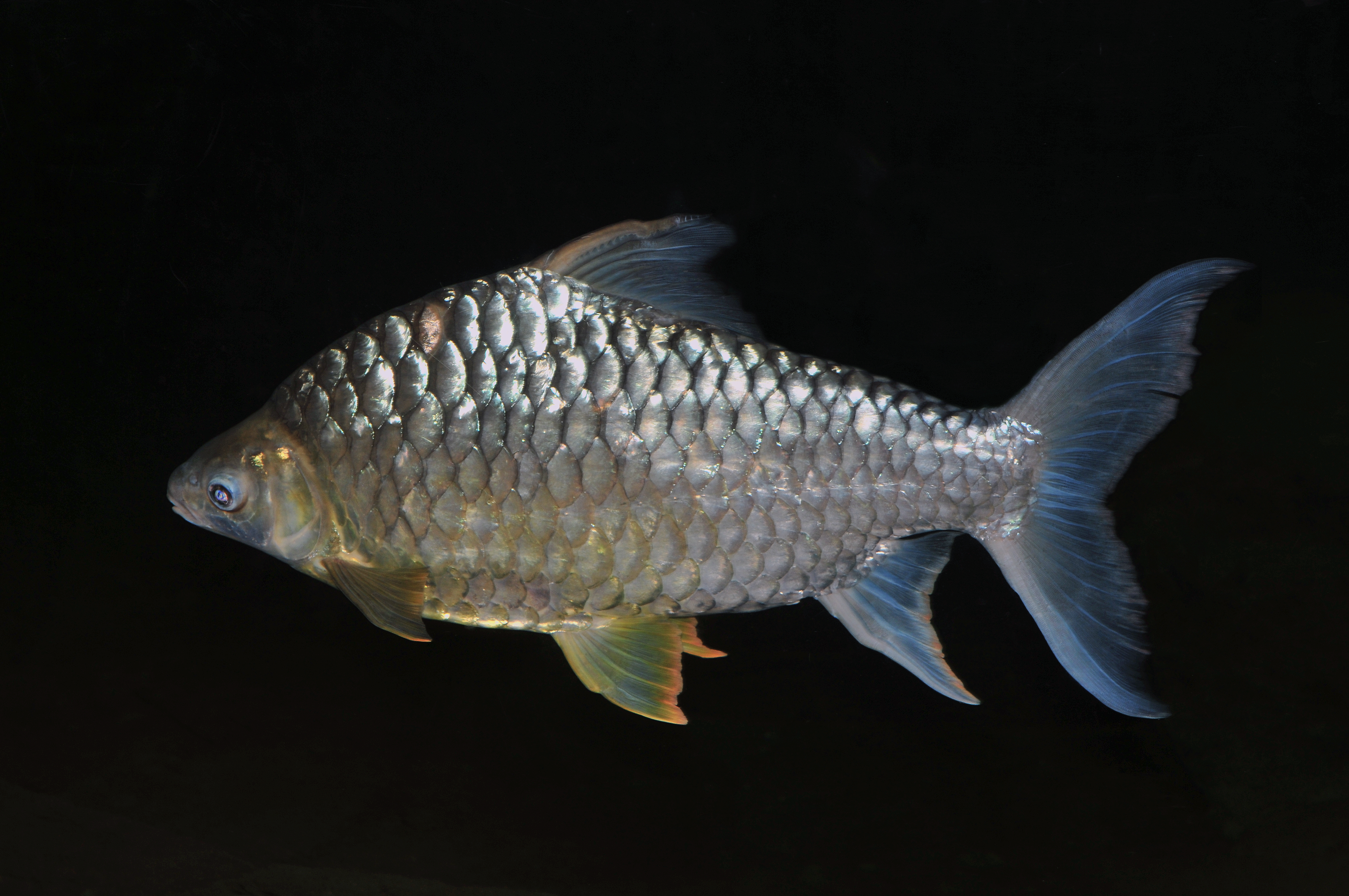
- Hypsibarbus pierrei

Scientific classification
- Kingdom: Animalia
- Phylum: Chordata
- Class: Actinopterygii
- Order: Cypriniformes
- Family: Cyprinidae
- Subfamily: Cyprininae
- Genus: Hypsibarbus; Rainboth, 1996

Type species
- Acrossocheilus malcolmi Smith, 1945

Species
- 10, see text.

= Hypsibarbus =

Genus of fishes

Hypsibarbus is a genus of cyprinid fish that is found in freshwater in Mainland Southeast Asia, including the Thai-Malay Peninsula.

== Species ==
Hypsibarbus contains the following extant species:

- Hypsibarbus birtwistlei (Herre, 1940)
- Hypsibarbus huguenini (Bleeker, 1853)
- Hypsibarbus lagleri Rainboth, 1996
- Hypsibarbus malcolmi (H. M. Smith 1945) (Goldfin tinfoil barb)
- Hypsibarbus myitkyinae (Prashad & Mukerji, 1929)
- Hypsibarbus oatesii (Boulenger, 1893)
- Hypsibarbus pierrei (Sauvage, 1880)
- Hypsibarbus salweenensis Rainboth, 1996
- Hypsibarbus suvattii Rainboth, 1996
- Hypsibarbus vernayi (Norman, 1925)
- Hypsibarbus wetmorei (H. M. Smith, 1931)

The following extinct Miocene species has been classified within this genus:

- †Hypsibarbus antiquus Roberts & Jumnongthai, 1999
