= Pao turgidus =

Conservation status
- Least Concern (IUCN 3.1)

Scientific classification
- Kingdom: Animalia
- Phylum: Chordata
- Class: Actinopterygii
- Order: Tetraodontiformes
- Family: Tetraodontidae
- Genus: Pao
- Species: P. turgidus

Binomial name
- Pao turgidus (Kottelat, 2000)

Synonyms
- Monotrete turgidus Kottelat, 2000; Tetraodon turgidus (Kottelat, 2000)

Species of fish

Pao turgidus is a species of freshwater pufferfish found in Southeast Asia. Its name has Latin origins: "turgidus" translates to "puffy" or "swollen" in English.

== Habitat and Distribution ==
P. turgidus are native to the Mekong basin (Cambodia, Laos, Thailand, Vietnam). They may also occur in the Chao Phraya basin in Thailand, although this has not yet been confirmed.

It remains in deep vegetation of specific habitats, and thus it is able to surprise any prey within a close distance. The P. turgidus populations are still healthy in specific conditions.

== Physical Features ==
P. turgidus can grow up to a length of 18.5 centimetres (7.3 in) SL. They are distinguished by their unique pattern: its back is black and brown with a green hue, which transitions into a white underside either gradually or abruptly. Spots can be found all throughout the head and back of the pufferfish. This pattern is noticed in juveniles as well as adults.

Sexual dimorphism has not been observed in P. turgidus, meaning males and females are indistinguishable. The lengths and weights of various P. turgidus specimens are variable across both males and females.

== Toxicity ==
These pufferfish are toxic, like many other pufferfishes. Unlike other pufferfish species in the Pao genus, P. turgidus are toxic in both the rainy and dry seasons. The primary toxins in P. turgidus are saxitoxins (STXs), but do not include tetrodotoxin (TTX), a toxin commonly found in the skin of marine pufferfish.

P. turgidus also contains paralytic shellfish toxins (PSTs), which are potent neurotoxins that can reduce muscle and nerve conduction. PSTs block sodium channels, which are fundamental in physiological function. These toxins were also seen in other aquatic organisms. Toxins are primarily localized to the skin and ovaries of P. turgidus. In fact, approximately 100 g of skin or ovary from P. turgidus with a toxicity of 30 MU/g constitutes the lethal dose of PST for humans. Studies show that pufferfish exogenously uptake PSTs, which are then accumulated and selectively transferred to the skin.

The major toxin found in P. turgidus, saxitoxin, is likely acquired through food, and mostly accumulates in the skin. The toxin typically found in marine pufferfishes, tetrodotoxin, is toxic to the Mekong pufferfish, and does not accumulate similarly in the skin.
