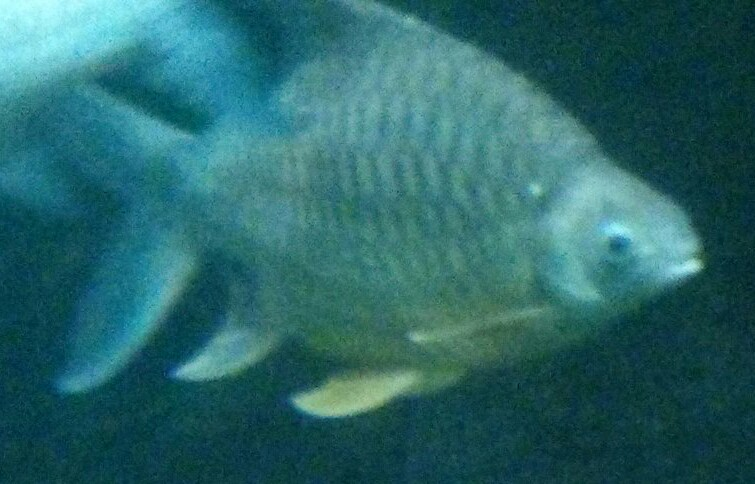

Conservation status
- Least Concern (IUCN 3.1)

Scientific classification
- Kingdom: Animalia
- Phylum: Chordata
- Class: Actinopterygii
- Order: Cypriniformes
- Family: Cyprinidae
- Genus: Hypsibarbus
- Species: H. vernayi

Binomial name
- Hypsibarbus vernayi (Norman, 1925)

Synonyms
- Barbus vernayi Norman, 1925; Barbodes vernayi (Norman, 1925); Puntius vernayi (Norman, 1925)

= Hypsibarbus vernayi =

Species of fish

Hypsibarbus vernayi is a species of cyprinid fish in the genus Hypsibarbus. The specific name references Arthur S. Vernay, an English adventurer who collected the type specimen.

== Description ==
The species can attain a maximum length of 21.6 cm and a maximum weight of 250 g.

== Distribution and habitat ==
The species is a freshwater fish and occurs in the basins of the Mekong, Chao Phraya and Mae Klong rivers in Thailand and other countries in Southeast Asia.

== Behavior ==
In Thailand, this species exhibits a breeding migration similar to salmon, gathering in shallow streams that are tributaries of the Nan River in the north to breed and spawn. This rare phenomenon occurs only for two days in early March each year and is locally known as "Pla Kong" (Thai: ปลากอง, RTGS: pla kong, pronounced [plaː kɔːŋ], lit. 'fish pile').
