= Hypsibarbus myitkyinae =

Conservation status
- Least Concern (IUCN 3.1)

Scientific classification
- Kingdom: Animalia
- Phylum: Chordata
- Class: Actinopterygii
- Order: Cypriniformes
- Family: Cyprinidae
- Genus: Hypsibarbus
- Species: H. myitkyinae

Binomial name
- Hypsibarbus myitkyinae (Prashad & Mukerji, 1929)

Synonyms
- Barbus myitkyinae Prashad & Mukerji, 1929

Species of fish

Hypsibarbus myitkyinae is a species of ray-finned fish in the genus Hypsibarbus from the upper Irrawaddy River drainage, as well as the Bago River drainage in Myanmar.

== Footnotes ==
- Froese, Rainer; Pauly, Daniel (eds.). "Hypsibarbus myitkyinae". FishBase.
