= Pao fangi =

Scientific classification
- Domain: Eukaryota
- Kingdom: Animalia
- Phylum: Chordata
- Class: Actinopterygii
- Order: Tetraodontiformes
- Family: Tetraodontidae
- Genus: Pao
- Species: P. fangi

Binomial name
- Pao fangi (Pellegrin & Chevey, 1940)

Synonyms
- Tetrodon fangi

Species of pufferfish

Pao fangi is a species of pufferfish in the family Tetraodontidae. It is a tropical freshwater species native to Vietnam. It was classified as a member of the genus Tetraodon (or Tetrodon, which is the genus that the species was initially described under according to ITIS) until 2013, when the genus Pao was created.
