= Carinotetraodon salivator =

Conservation status
- Near Threatened (IUCN 3.1)

Scientific classification
- Kingdom: Animalia
- Phylum: Chordata
- Class: Actinopterygii
- Order: Tetraodontiformes
- Family: Tetraodontidae
- Genus: Carinotetraodon
- Species: C. salivator

Binomial name
- Carinotetraodon salivator Lim & Kottelat, 1995
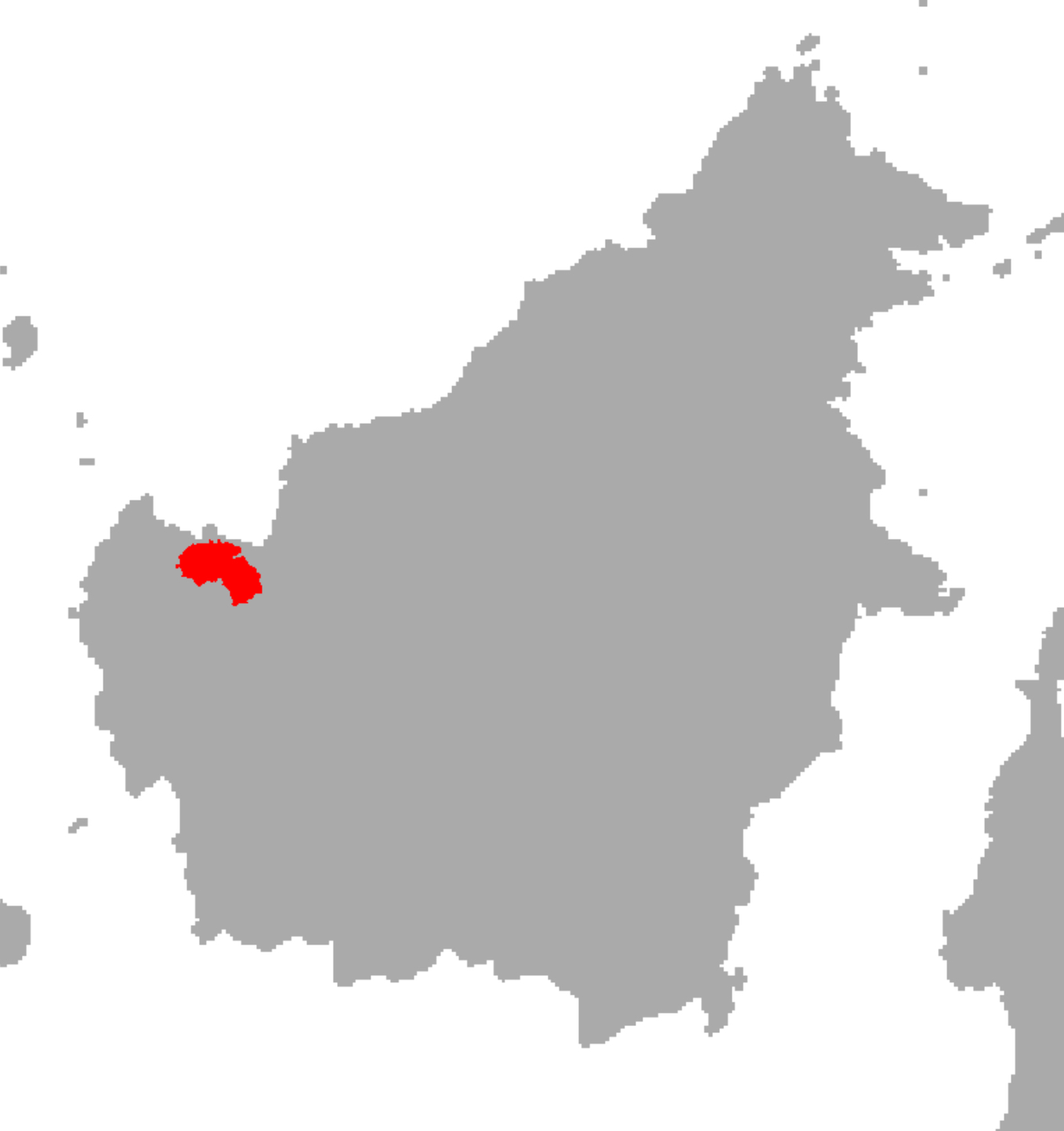

Species of fish

Carinotetraodon salivator, also known as the striped red-eye puffer, is a species of freshwater pufferfish in the family Tetraodontidae. It is a tropical species known only from Sarawak, Malaysian Borneo, where it occurs at a depth range of 1 to 2 m (3 to 7 ft). It is found in large, fast-flowing streams with silty and sandy bottoms, leaf litter, and submerged logs. It reaches 4 cm (1.6 in) standard length and is occasionally seen in the aquarium trade.
