= Pao leiurus =

Conservation status
- Least Concern (IUCN 3.1)

Scientific classification
- Kingdom: Animalia
- Phylum: Chordata
- Class: Actinopterygii
- Order: Tetraodontiformes
- Family: Tetraodontidae
- Genus: Pao
- Species: P. leiurus

Binomial name
- Pao leiurus (Bleeker, 1850)

Synonyms
- Tetraodon leiurus Bleeker, 1850; Monotrete leiurus (Bleeker, 1850)

Species of fish

Pao leiurus is a species of pufferfish found in Southeast Asia from Thailand to Indonesia and in particular the Mekong basin. It is occasionally imported into the aquarium trade but is reported to be aggressive and snappish.

== Characteristics ==
P. leiurus, which grows to around 16 cm (6.3 in), can be identified by dirty brown, brownish grey or gray markings on the upper part of the body which is poorly separated from markings on the lower body which tends to be dirty off-white, yellowish or pale grey with dusky mottling or spots. P. leiurus also typically display occelated spots which may be red, green or blue.

P. leiurus are typically found in tropical freshwater or brackish water, with temperatures ranging between 24 °C and 28 °C, including streams and rivers in upland and lowland areas, flowing and standing water habitats, swamps, and reservoirs.

Like most Tetraodontidae, P. leiurus is a molluscivore and feeds on molluscs, crustaceans, and other invertebrates.
