= Pao cambodgiensis =

Conservation status
- Least Concern (IUCN 3.1)

Scientific classification
- Domain: Eukaryota
- Kingdom: Animalia
- Phylum: Chordata
- Class: Actinopterygii
- Order: Tetraodontiformes
- Family: Tetraodontidae
- Genus: Pao
- Species: P. cambodgiensis

Binomial name
- Pao cambodgiensis (Chabanaud, 1923)

Synonyms
- Tetraodon cambodgiensis Chabanaud, 1923; Monotrete cambodgiensis (Chabanaud, 1923)

Species of fish

Pao cambodgiensis is a species of freshwater pufferfish native to the Mekong basin. It is also recorded from Dong Nai River. This species grows to a length of 15.3 centimetres (6.0 in) SL.
