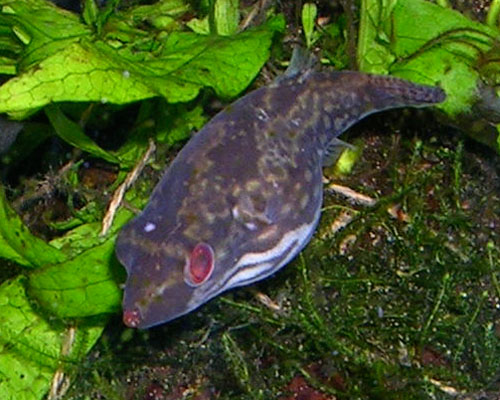
- Female

Scientific classification
- Kingdom: Animalia
- Phylum: Chordata
- Class: Actinopterygii
- Order: Tetraodontiformes
- Family: Tetraodontidae
- Genus: Carinotetraodon
- Species: C. irrubesco

Binomial name
- Carinotetraodon irrubesco Tan, 1999
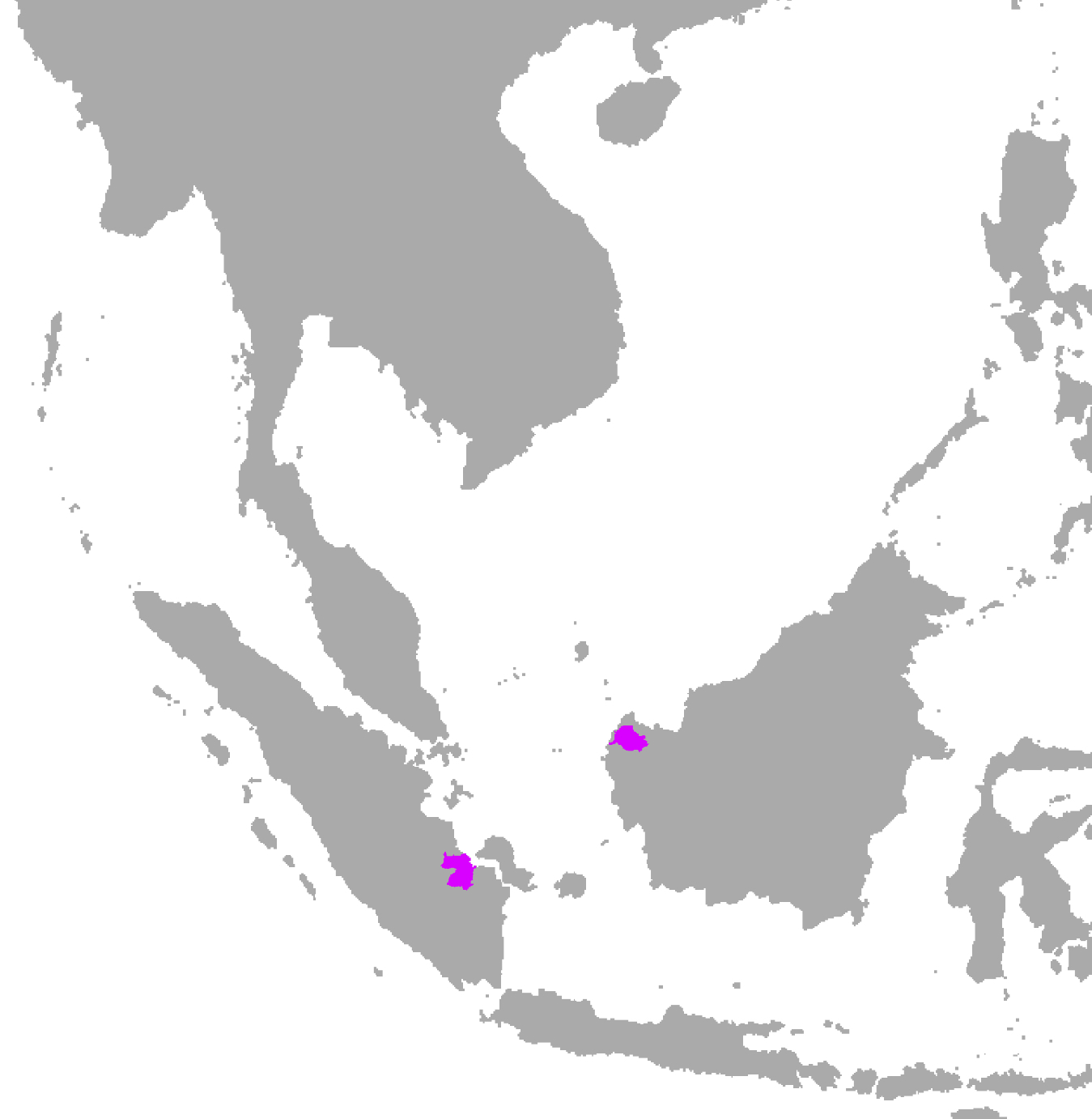

= Carinotetraodon irrubesco =

Species of fish

Carinotetraodon irrubesco, known commonly as the red-tail dwarf puffer, is a freshwater pufferfish found only in the lower Banyuasin basin in South Sumatra and the Sambas River in West Kalimantan, both in Indonesia.

== Description ==
Carinotetraodon irrubesco is a small pufferfish growing to around 44 mm (1.7 in). Like other species in its genus, sexual dimorphism is apparent. Males are larger and colored brown with creamy stripes on the flanks and the dorsal surface, while females are smaller and mottled brown in color, with irregular markings on the ventral surface. Both sexes have red eyes but only males possess a red caudal fin.

== Habitat ==
Carinotetraodon irrubesco lives in murky, acidic water amongst submerged vegetation alongside rasboras, pipefish, halfbeaks and gobies.

== In captivity ==
Carinotetraodon irrubesco can be found in the aquarium trade (otherwise, it has no commercial importance), and hence finds its way to home aquaria. In the wild, this fish lives in an environment with an abundance of vegetation (which it uses to hide from predators), so it is best to keep it in a heavily planted tank to make it feel safe and secure. The substrate of the tank should be of very soft fine sand (of at least 2 cm (0.79 in) in depth), since Carinotetraodon irrubesco would wallow and bury itself in the substrate as another way of protecting itself against predators, and harder substrates would injure the fish when it attempts to do so.
