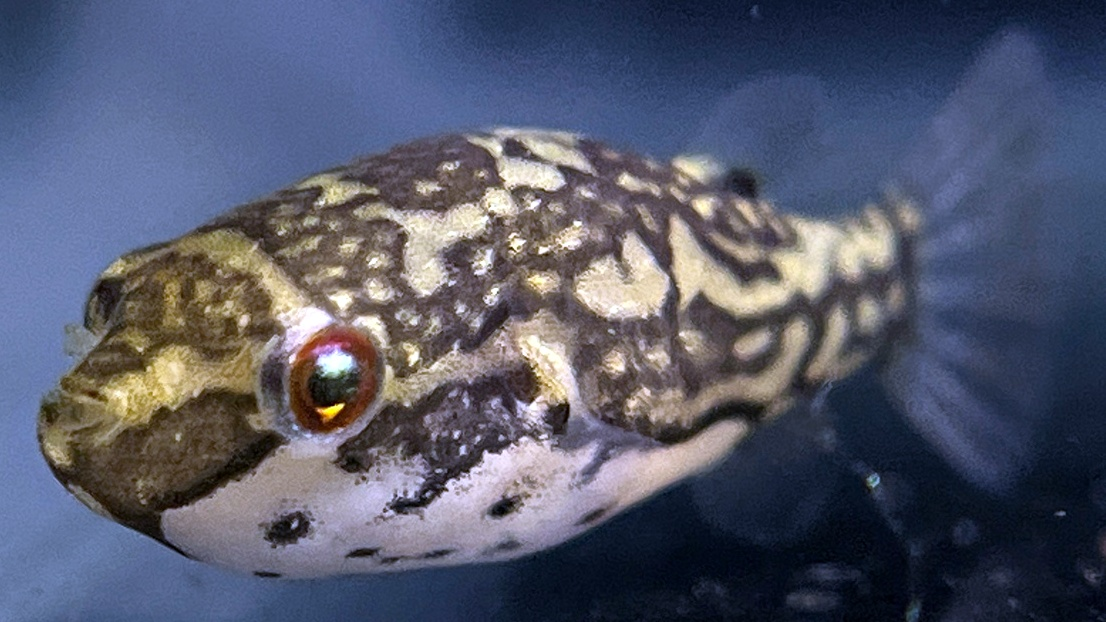
- Female

Conservation status
- Least Concern (IUCN 3.1)

Scientific classification
- Kingdom: Animalia
- Phylum: Chordata
- Class: Actinopterygii
- Order: Tetraodontiformes
- Family: Tetraodontidae
- Genus: Carinotetraodon
- Species: C. lorteti

Binomial name
- Carinotetraodon lorteti (Tirant, 1885)
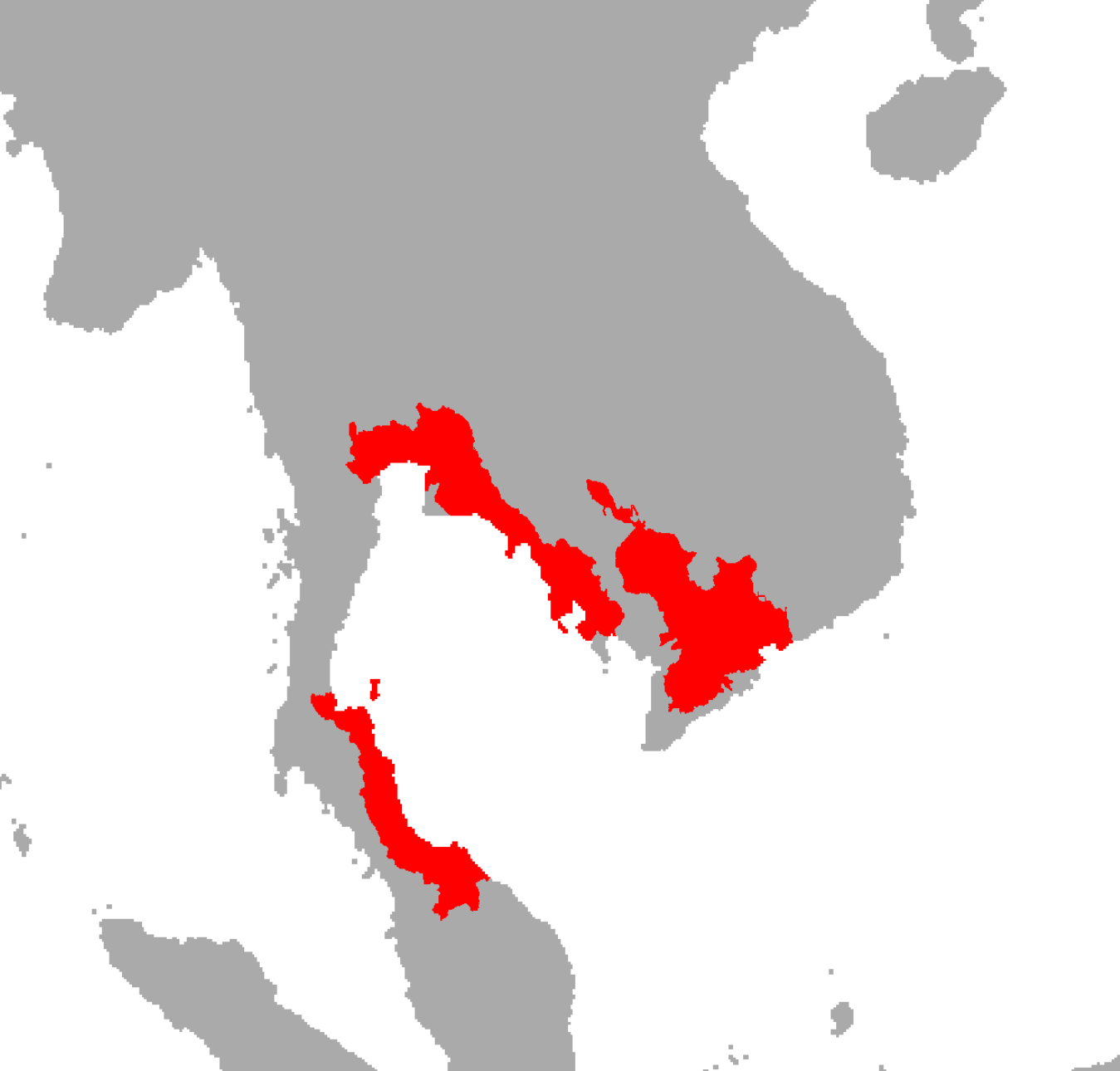

Synonyms
- Carinotetraodon chlupatyi Benl, 1957; Monotreta tiranti d’Aubenton & Blanc, 1966; Tetraodon lorteti Tirant, 1885; Tetraodon somphongsi Klausewitz, 1957; Tetraodon werneri Benl & Chlupaty, 1957

= Somphong's puffer =

Species of fish

Somphong's puffer, redeye puffer or crested puffer (Carinotetraodon lorteti) is a small freshwater pufferfish found in mainland Southeast Asia, such as Thailand, Cambodia and Vietnam. It is often found in canals and brackish waters along the coast; in the canals of Thonburi, Bangkok, for example, it may be found hiding in areas with dense water hyacinths.

== Etymology ==
The common name of the species, as well as one of the junior synonyms (Tetraodon somphongsi to be precise), honors the Thai fish explorer and aquarium trader Somphong Lek-aree, who discovered three new freshwater fish species, namely the dwarf loach (Ambastaia sidthimunki), Poropuntius melanogrammus (formerly Puntius somphongsi), and Somphong's rasbora (Trigonostigma somphongsi).

== Description ==
The male has a ruby-red body and red eyes, and is significantly larger than the female. When fully matured, Somphong's puffer grows to about 7 cm (2.8 in) in length.

== Human interactions ==
Somphong's puffer can be found in the aquarium trade. In home aquarium settings, keeping this puffer in a heavily planted tank is recommended, since it is easily spooked, and relies on submerged plants for refuge in such situations.
