= Chelonodontops pleurospilus =

Conservation status
- Endangered (IUCN 3.1)

Scientific classification
- Kingdom: Animalia
- Phylum: Chordata
- Class: Actinopterygii
- Order: Tetraodontiformes
- Family: Tetraodontidae
- Genus: Chelonodontops
- Species: C. pleurospilus

Binomial name
- Chelonodontops pleurospilus (Regan, 1919)

Synonyms
- Tetrodon pleurospilus Regan, 1919; Chelonodontops pulchellus Smith, 1958; Sphaeroides pleurospilus; Sphoeroides pleurospilus

Species of pufferfish

Chelonodontops pleurospilus, commonly known as the blaasop beauty, is a species of pufferfish in the family Tetraodontidae. It is a marine species endemic to South Africa, where it ranges from the mouth of the Xora River to Durban. It is demersal and found in shallow water (1–10 m depth).

It reaches 20 cm (7.9 inches) in total length. It is poisonous and not suitable for human consumption.
