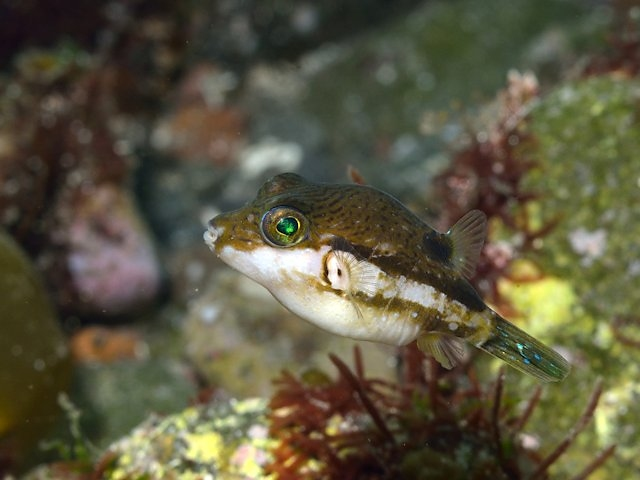

Conservation status
- Least Concern (IUCN 3.1)

Scientific classification
- Kingdom: Animalia
- Phylum: Chordata
- Class: Actinopterygii
- Order: Tetraodontiformes
- Family: Tetraodontidae
- Genus: Canthigaster
- Species: C. rivulata

Binomial name
- Canthigaster rivulata (Temminck & Schlegel, 1850)

= Canthigaster rivulata =

Species of fish

Canthigaster rivulata commonly known as the brown-lined puffer, or kitamakura (Japanese: キタマクラ) is a marine fish belonging to the family Tetradontidae.

== Description ==
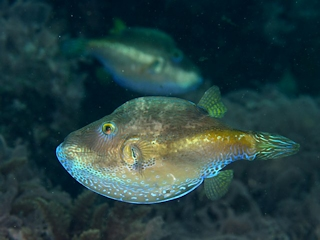
Male in breeding colours

Canthigaster rivulata is a fish which grows up to 15–20 cm length. Its body has 2 longitudinal dark bands that join in front of the gill slit, lower band that is either faint or absent, small dark spots in the ventral area, caudal fin with dark stripes and a dark blotch at the caudal base.

== Distribution and habitat ==
This species are found in tropical waters of Indo-Pacific. It can be seen in the waters from East Africa south to Natal, South Africa and east to Hawaii, north to southern Japan and south to north western Australia.

They are usually near rocky and coral reefs that are 100 metres deep however they are also found around shore lines that are around 30 metres deep.

== Diet ==
Canthigaster rivulata is omnivorous and preys mainly on algae, echinoderms and molluscs.

== Behaviour and breeding ==
This pufferfish is a solitary animal. Its breeding season is in Summer and during this time, the male presents its breeding colour which shows vibrant blue patterns around its body.

== Poison ==
The fish has the poison, tetrodotoxin, resided in the intestine, liver but mostly in the skin and the mucus generated by it, however it is not present in the muscle or the ovary like most other Pufferfish. Its mucus has high risk of contamination of the toxin to other fish or human due to direct contact with the skin.
