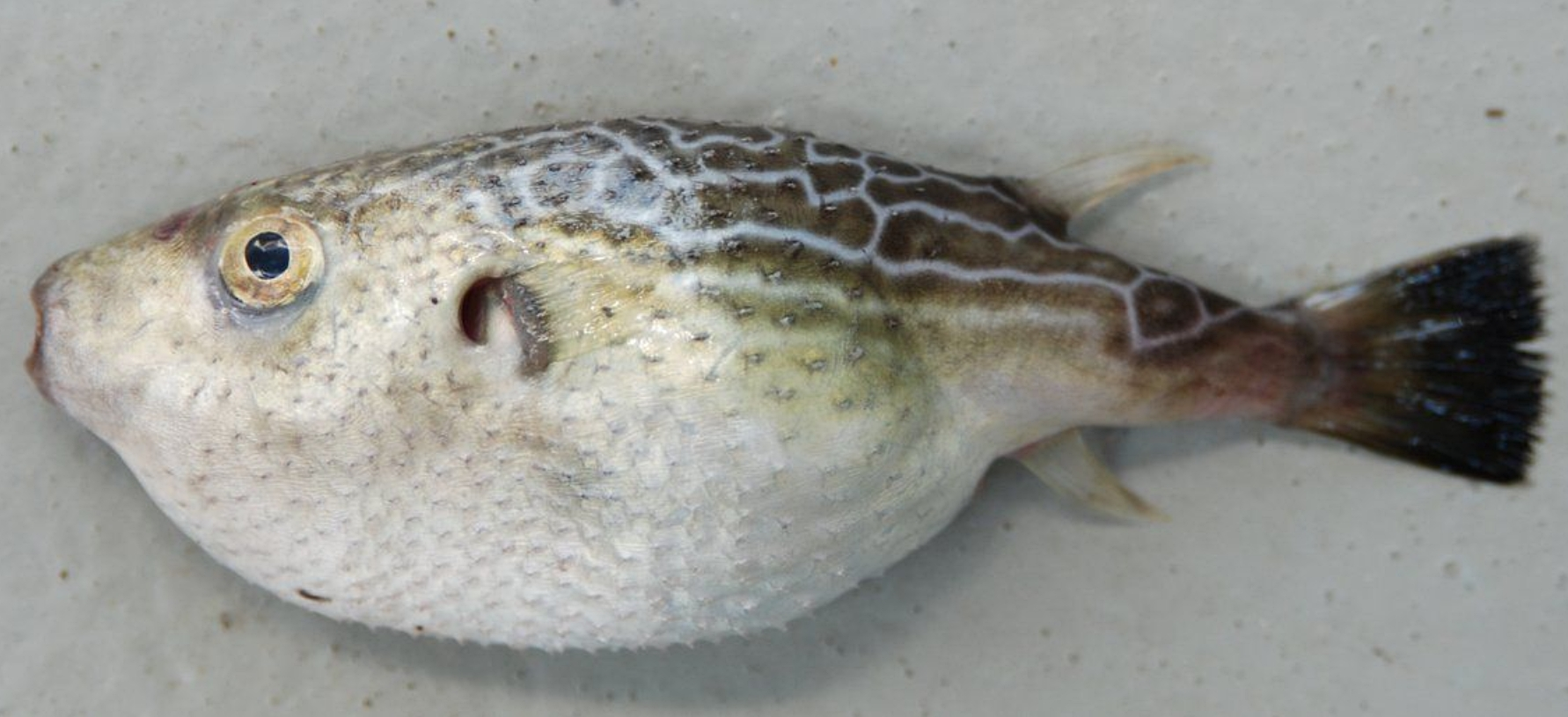

Scientific classification
- Kingdom: Animalia
- Phylum: Chordata
- Class: Actinopterygii
- Order: Tetraodontiformes
- Family: Tetraodontidae
- Genus: Pelagocephalus; J. C. Tyler & Paxton, 1979
- Species: P. marki

Binomial name
- Pelagocephalus marki Heemstra & M. M. Smith, 1981

= Pelagocephalus =

Genus of fishes

Pelagocephalus is a genus of pufferfish which is from the coasts of South Africa and New Zealand. It is monotypic, being represented by the single species, Pelagocephalus marki, also known as the rippled blaasop. This species grows to a length of about 12 centimetres (4.7 in) TL.
