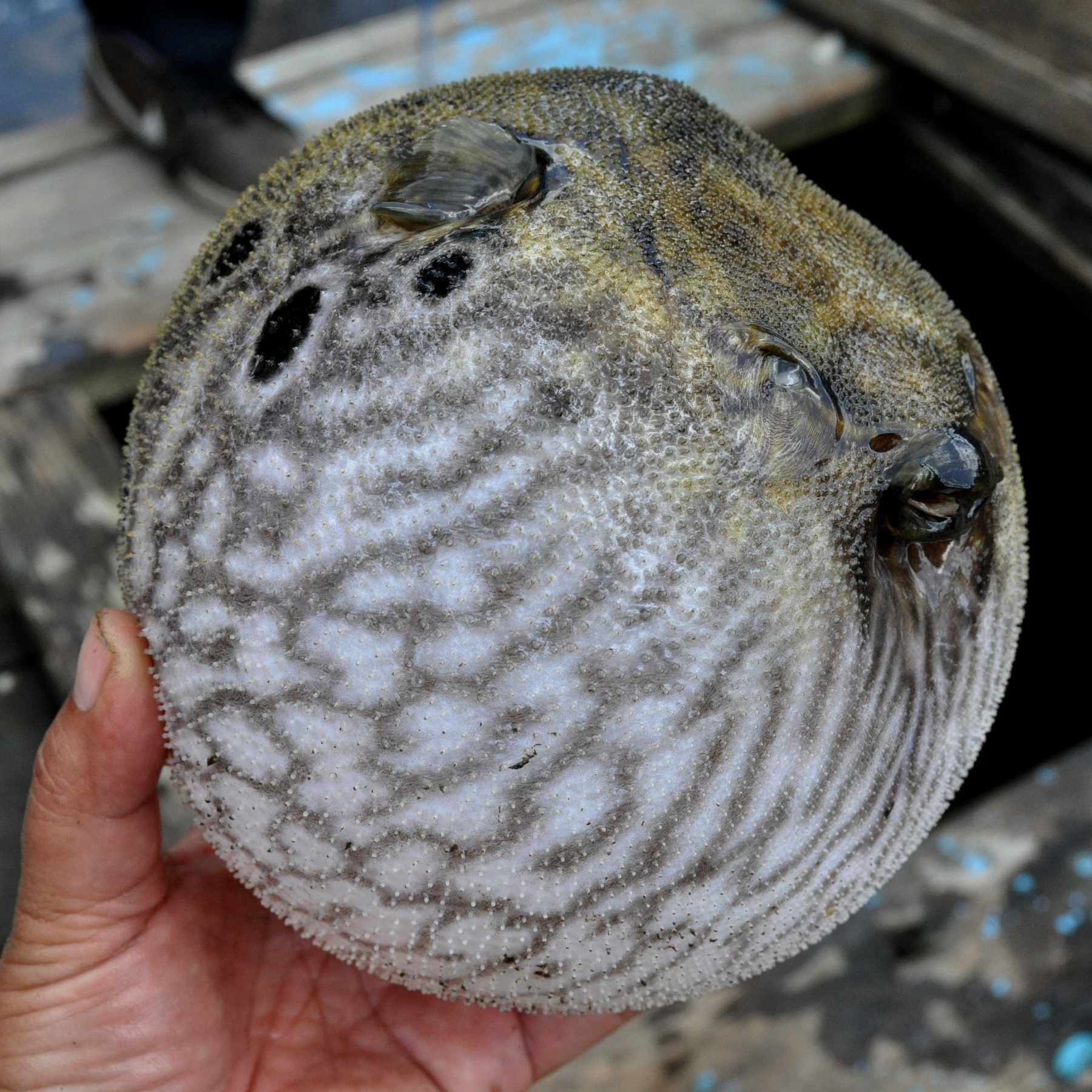
- Inflated state

Conservation status
- Least Concern (IUCN 3.1)

Scientific classification
- Kingdom: Animalia
- Phylum: Chordata
- Class: Actinopterygii
- Division: Teleostei
- Order: Tetraodontiformes
- Family: Tetraodontidae
- Genus: Pao
- Species: P. palembangensis

Binomial name
- Pao palembangensis (Bleeker, 1852)
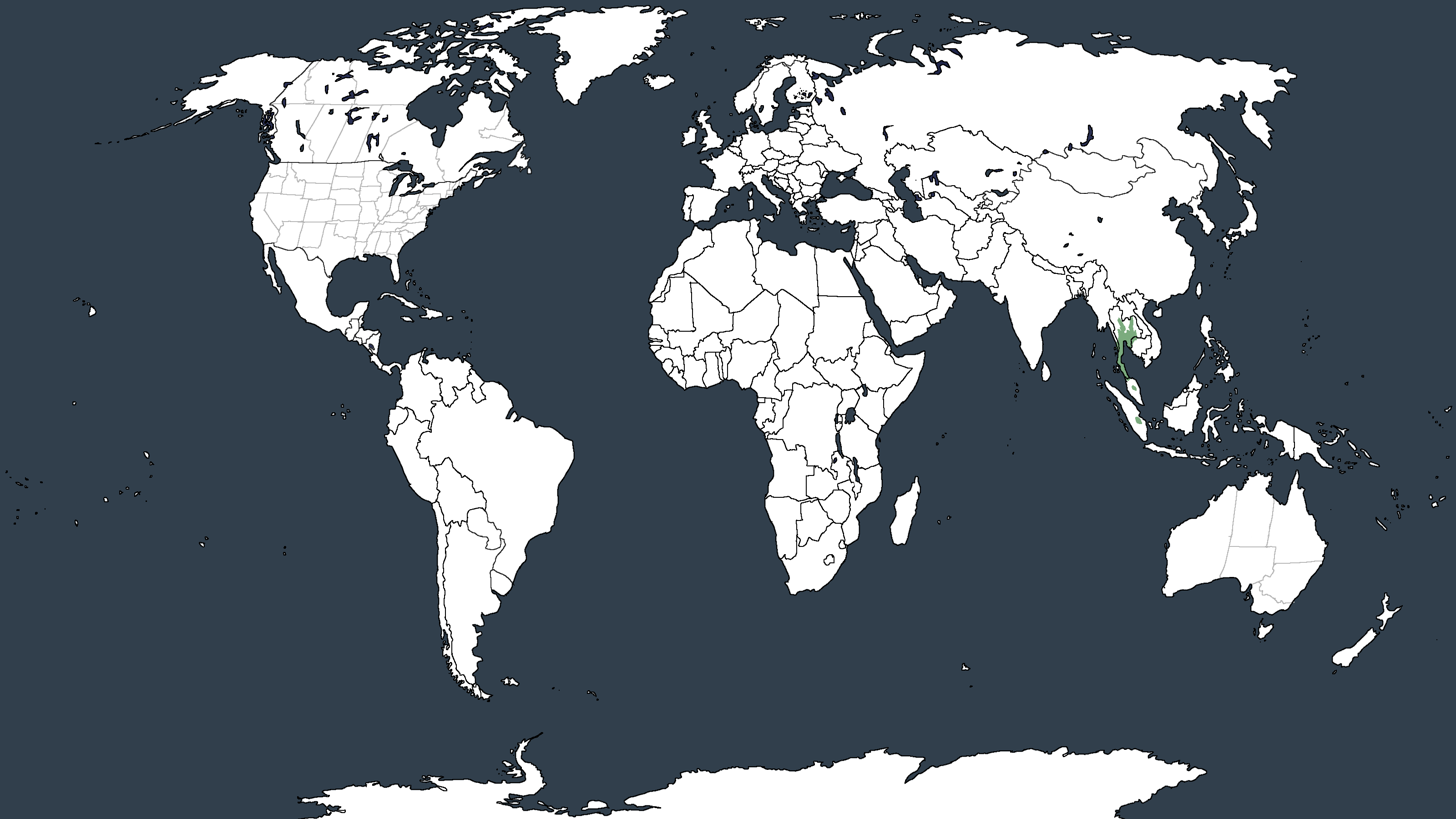

Synonyms
- Tetraodon palembangensis Bleeker, 1852; Monotretus palembangensis (Bleeker, 1852); Tetraodon pinguis Vaillant, 1902

= Pao palembangensis =

Species of fish

Pao palembangensis (formerly Tetraodon palembangensis), is a species of freshwater pufferfish native to Thailand, Laos, Malaysia and Indonesia in Southeast Asia. Its commonly called the humpback puffer or dragon puffer. It is bred for aquaria as an ornamental fish because of its beautiful skin colouration and pattern.

== Description ==
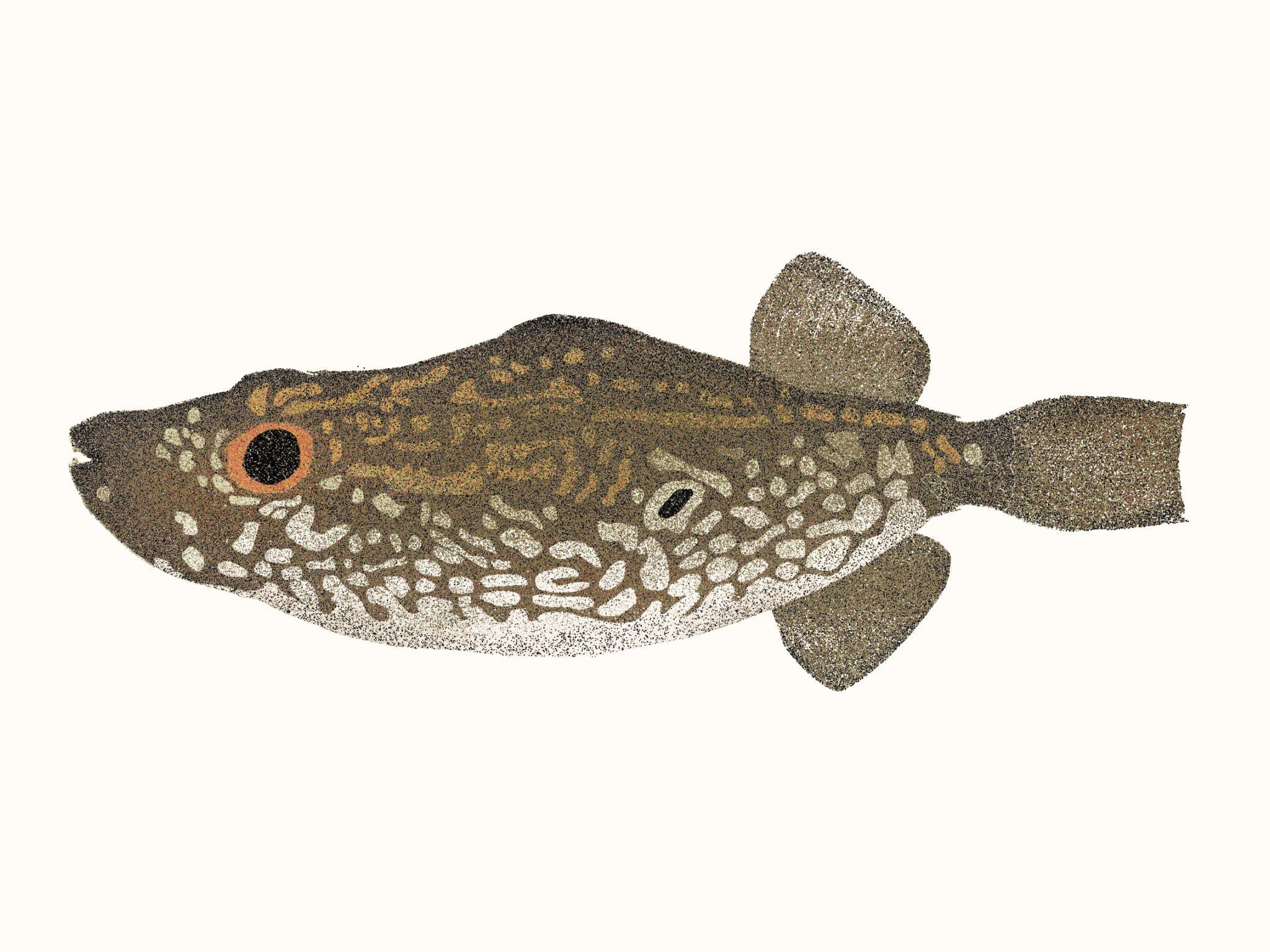
Unengored individual

Living in alkalescent, warm (24–28°), and slow-flowing rivers, Pao palembangensis grows to a length of 19.4 centimetres (7.6 in) SL. It is the largest member of its genus, and the third-largest freshwater pufferfish, only being outsized by the Fahaka and Mbu puffers.

It is chocolate-brown, with a pale mottled underbelly and an elongated head. The large eyes of this fish are a distinct orange. As a pufferfish its body contains the neurotoxin tetrodotoxin (TTX), and it can swell up to three times its normal size as a defence mechanism when threatened. Females have a more pronounced "humpback", the result of a more arched spinal column.

Having a small genome size (362Mb), a chromosome-scale genome assembly of P. palembangensis was sequenced as part of the Fish10K subproject of the Earth BioGenome Project.

== Behaviour ==
It was previously thought to be an ambush predator but it is now believed that is not the case. P. palembangensis is an active hunter that pursues sleeping aquatic prey. It is a nocturnal fish as evidence by its large eyes, increased nightly activity, and daytime sleep..
