= Feroxodon =

Conservation status
- Least Concern (IUCN 3.1)

Scientific classification
- Kingdom: Animalia
- Phylum: Chordata
- Class: Actinopterygii
- Division: Teleostei
- Order: Tetraodontiformes
- Family: Tetraodontidae
- Genus: Feroxodon; J. X. Su, Hardy & J. C. Tyler, 1986
- Species: F. multistriatus

Binomial name
- Feroxodon multistriatus (J. Richardson, 1854)

Synonyms
- Anchisomus multistriatus

Species of fish

Feroxodon multistriatus, known as the manystriped blowfish, manystriped pufferfish, scribbled toadfish, or ferocious pufferfish, is a species in the pufferfish family, Tetraodontidae, distributed in the Indo-West Pacific. It is the only member of the monotypic genus Feroxodon.

In Western Australia

The fish has sloping, thin, brown and white lines on the head and body curving toward the tail. The lower head, body and caudal peduncle are spotted. The maximum size is reported as 39 cm (15 in) to 90 cm (3 ft).

The fish occurs throughout the Indo-Western Pacific, including New Guinea, and is recorded from Western Australia south to New South Wales.

== Biology ==
In spite of its small size, this fish is known to make unprovoked attacks on humans, the inspiration for the common name ferocious pufferfish. One such attack near Thursday Island, Queensland, Australia, caused severe damage to the toes of a five-year-old boy.

This fish "inhabits shallow inshore waters and offshore soft bottoms. Feeds on fish and invertebrates. Highly toxic and is responsible for amputation of swimmers toes."
