= Pao cochinchinensis =

Conservation status
- Least Concern (IUCN 3.1)

Scientific classification
- Kingdom: Animalia
- Phylum: Chordata
- Class: Actinopterygii
- Division: Teleostei
- Order: Tetraodontiformes
- Family: Tetraodontidae
- Genus: Pao
- Species: P. cochinchinensis

Binomial name
- Pao cochinchinensis (Steindachner, 1866)

Synonyms
- Crayacion cochinchinensis Steindachner, 1866; Monotrete cochinchinensis (Steindachner, 1866); Tetraodon cochinchinensis (Steindachner, 1866)

Species of fish

Pao cochinchinensis is a species of freshwater pufferfish native to the basins of the Mekong and Chao Phraya Rivers. This species grows to a length of 7 centimetres (2.8 in) SL.

It is known for its reputation to attack people by slicing off bits of flesh. Their tendency to take chunks of human flesh is similar to piranhas. It is one of two pufferfish species to attack humans, the other species is the Ferocious Pufferfish (Feroxodon multistriatus).
