= Canthigaster coronata =

Conservation status
- Least Concern (IUCN 3.1)

Scientific classification
- Kingdom: Animalia
- Phylum: Chordata
- Class: Actinopterygii
- Division: Teleostei
- Order: Tetraodontiformes
- Family: Tetraodontidae
- Genus: Canthigaster
- Species: C. coronata

Binomial name
- Canthigaster coronata (Vaillant & Sauvage, 1875)

Species of fish

Canthigaster coronata, commonly called the crowned toby, is a species of pufferfish endemic to the Hawaiian Islands. It occasionally makes its way into the aquarium trade.

== Description ==
The crowned toby grows to a size of 14 cm in length. Its back has three dark brown saddles that may have reminded Hawaiians of lava flows, hence the species being known by its Hawaiian name pu'u olai, meaning "cinder cone". Yellow dots cover much of the whitish bodies, while blue and yellow lines radiate from their eyes.

== Related species ==
Canthigaster cyanospilota and C. axiologus were once synonymized with C. coronata to give the crowned toby an Indo-Pacific distribution, but Randall et al. (2008) found C. cyanospilota and C. axiologa to sufficiently distinct from C. coronata to be revalidated.
