= Canthigaster flavoreticulata =

Conservation status
- Data Deficient (IUCN 3.1)

Scientific classification
- Kingdom: Animalia
- Phylum: Chordata
- Class: Actinopterygii
- Order: Tetraodontiformes
- Family: Tetraodontidae
- Genus: Canthigaster
- Species: C. flavoreticulata

Binomial name
- Canthigaster flavoreticulata Matsuura, 1986

Species of fish

Canthigaster flavoreticulata is a species of pufferfish in the family Tetraodontidae. It is a tropical marine species associated with reefs. It is known only from Tonga, where it occurs at a depth range of 98 to 111 m (322 to 364 ft).
