= Canthigaster =

Sharpnose puffer
- Canthigaster rostrata

Scientific classification
- Kingdom: Animalia
- Phylum: Chordata
- Class: Actinopterygii
- Division: Teleostei
- Order: Tetraodontiformes
- Family: Tetraodontidae
- Genus: Canthigaster; Swainson, 1839

Type species
- Tetrodon rostratus (Bloch, 1786)

Species
- 39; see text.

Genus of fishes

Canthigaster is a genus in the pufferfish family (Tetraodontidae). Species of this genus are commonly referred to as tobies (a generally accepted name that originated in Australia) or sharpnose puffers.

== Etymology ==
From Ancient Greek κανθός (canthós), meaning "corner of the eye", and γαστήρ (gastḗr), meaning "belly"

== Species ==
Canthigaster is the most speciose genus in Tetraodontidae. It includes the following species:

Image	Species	Common name
	Canthigaster amboinensis (Bleeker, 1865)	Spider-eye puffer
	Canthigaster axiologus Whitley, 1931	Pacific crown toby
	Canthigaster aziz Matsuura, Bogorodsky, Mal & Alpermann 2020	Aziz's toby
	Canthigaster bennetti (Bleeker, 1854)	Bennett's sharpnose puffer
	Canthigaster caeruleolineata Fricke, Wickel, Pinault, Nicet & Delrieu-Trottin, 2022	Blue-lined toby
	Canthigaster callisterna (J. D. Ogilby, 1889)	Clown toado
	Canthigaster capistrata (R. T. Lowe, 1839)	Macaronesian sharpnose-puffer
	Canthigaster compressa (Marion de Procé, 1822)	Compressed toby
	Canthigaster coronata (Vaillant & Sauvage, 1875)	Crowned puffer
	Canthigaster criobe J. T. Williams, Delrieu-Trottin & Planes, 2012	Striped toby
	Canthigaster cyanetron J. E. Randall & Cea Egaña, 1989	
	Canthigaster cyanospilota J. E. Randall, J. T. Williams & L. A. Rocha, 2008	
	Canthigaster epilampra (O. P. Jenkins, 1903)	Lantern toby
	Canthigaster figueiredoi R. L. Moura & R. M. C. Castro, 2002	Southern Atlantic sharpnose-puffer
	Canthigaster flavoreticulata Matsuura, 1986	
	Canthigaster inframacula G. R. Allen & J. E. Randall, 1977	
	Canthigaster investigatoris (Annandale & J. T. Jenkins, 1910)	
	Canthigaster jactator (O. P. Jenkins, 1901)	Hawaiian whitespotted toby
	Canthigaster jamestyleri R. L. Moura & R. M. C. Castro, 2002	Goldface toby
	Canthigaster janthinoptera (Bleeker, 1855)	Honeycomb toby
	Canthigaster leoparda Lubbock & G. R. Allen, 1979	Leopard sharpnose puffer
	Canthigaster margaritata (Rüppell, 1829)	Pearl toby
	Canthigaster marquesensis G. R. Allen & J. E. Randall, 1977	
	Canthigaster natalensis (Günther, 1870)	Natal toby
	Canthigaster ocellicincta G. R. Allen & J. E. Randall, 1977	Shy toby
	Canthigaster papua (Bleeker, 1848)	Papuan toby
	Canthigaster petersii (Bianconi, 1854)	Peter's toby
	Canthigaster punctata Matsuura, 1992	
	Canthigaster punctatissima (Günther, 1870)	Spotted sharpnosed puffer
	Canthigaster pygmaea G. R. Allen & J. E. Randall, 1977	Pygmy toby
	Canthigaster rapaensis G. R. Allen & J. E. Randall, 1977	
	Canthigaster rivulata (Temminck & Schlegel, 1850)	Brown-lined puffer
	Canthigaster rostrata (Bloch, 1786)	Caribbean sharpnose-puffer
	Canthigaster sanctaehelenae (Günther, 1870)	St. Helena sharpnose pufferfish
	Canthigaster smithae G. R. Allen & J. E. Randall, 1977	Bicolored toby
	Canthigaster solandri (Richardson, 1845)	Spotted sharpnose
	Canthigaster supramacula R. L. Moura & R. M. C. Castro, 2002	West African sharpnose-puffer
	Canthigaster tyleri G. R. Allen & J. E. Randall, 1977	Tyler's toby
	Canthigaster valentini (Bleeker, 1853)	Valentinni's sharpnose puffer
