= Canthigaster figueiredoi =

Conservation status
- Least Concern (IUCN 3.1)

Scientific classification
- Kingdom: Animalia
- Phylum: Chordata
- Class: Actinopterygii
- Division: Teleostei
- Order: Tetraodontiformes
- Family: Tetraodontidae
- Genus: Canthigaster
- Species: C. figueiredoi

Binomial name
- Canthigaster figueiredoi R. L. Moura & R. M. C. Castro, 2002

Species of fish

Canthigaster figueiredoi, known as the Southern Atlantic sharpnose-puffer, is a species of marine fish in the family Tetraodontidae. It was first isolated from the east coast of South America, in the Atlantic Ocean.

== Etymology ==
It is named in honor of Jose Lima de Figueiredo (b. 1943), a Brazilian fish taxonomist, of the Museu de Zoologia da Universidade de São Paulo, for his contributions to the advancement of the taxonomy of Brazilian marine fishes.

== Description ==
Canthigaster figueiredoi can measure up to 12 centimetres (4.7 in), counting with 9 or 10 dorsal soft rays and 9 anal soft rays. This particular species differs from other Atlantic Canthigaster species by the long extension of the horizontal dark stripe on its flank (originating on the ventral caudal fin's margin). The latter reaches the pectoral fin. Compared to C. jamestyleri by the presence of a dark caudal-fin margin; the absence of bars on the caudal fin; its possession of less stripes and spots on its dorsum; and by the absence of a small black spot on its anal fin. It is often found in pairs, and feeds on vegetation, sponges, crustaceans, and mollusks.

== Distribution ==
The species is reef-associated, with a depth range between 1 and 35 metres (3.3 and 114.8 ft). Its geographical range is estimated between latitudes 9°N and 33°S, which includes southern Caribbean to Santa Catarina, Brazil, including islands of the Atol das Rocas and Fernando de Noronha.
