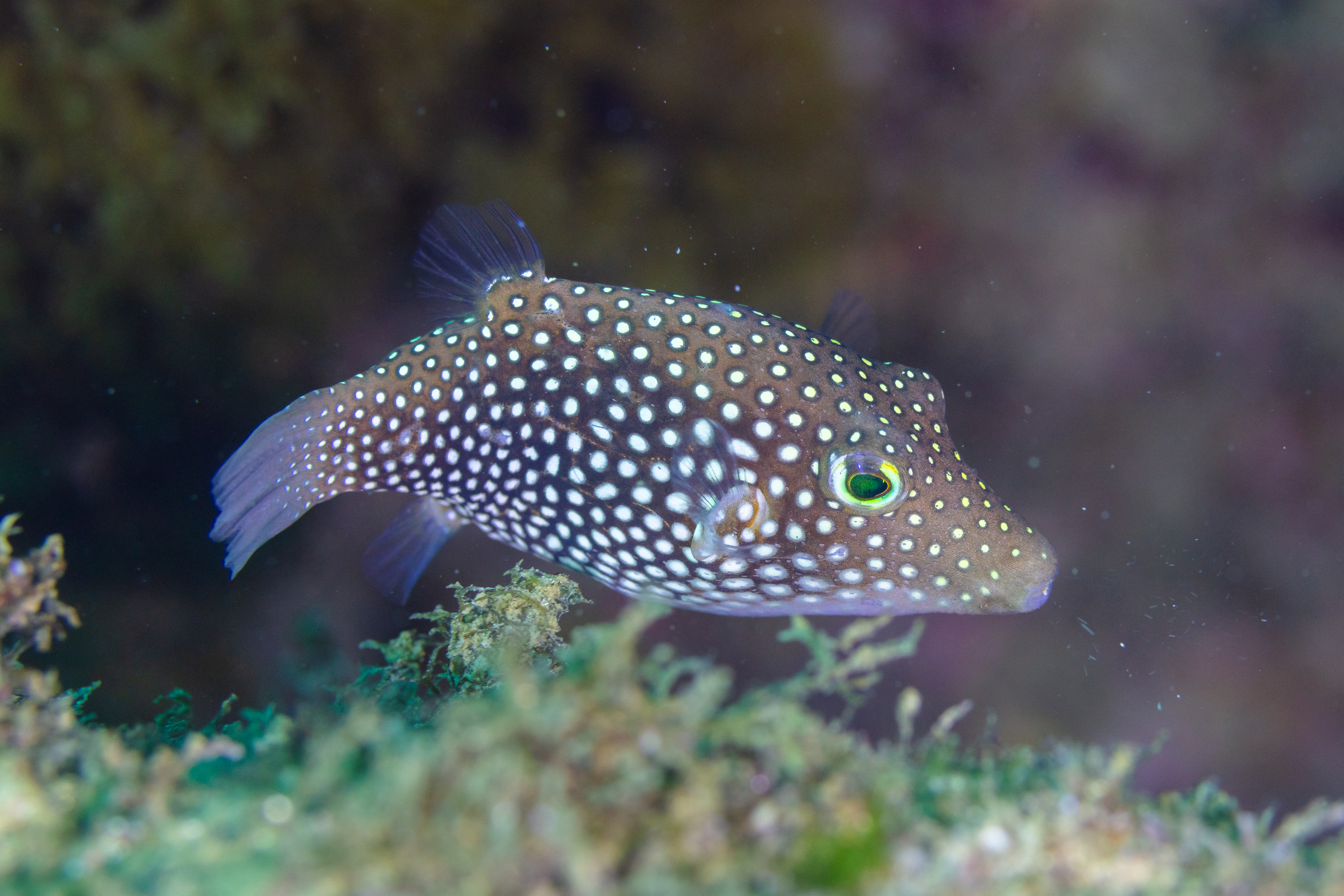

Conservation status
- Least Concern (IUCN 3.1)

Scientific classification
- Kingdom: Animalia
- Phylum: Chordata
- Class: Actinopterygii
- Division: Teleostei
- Order: Tetraodontiformes
- Family: Tetraodontidae
- Genus: Canthigaster
- Species: C. punctatissima

Binomial name
- Canthigaster punctatissima (Günther, 1870)

Synonyms
- Canthigaster brederi; Canthigaster punctatissimus; Canthigaster punctatissimus reticulatus; Sphoeroides brunneus; Tetrodon oxyrrhynchus; Tetrodon punctatissimus

= Canthigaster punctatissima =

Species of pufferfish

Canthigaster punctatissima, known as the spotted sharpnose puffer or the spotted sharpnosed puffer, is a species of pufferfish in the family Tetraodontidae. It is native to the Eastern Pacific, where it ranges from Guaymas, Mexico to Panama and the Galápagos Islands. It is replaced by its close relatives C. janthinoptera and C. jactator in the Western Pacific and the Hawaiian Islands, respectively. It is found in sheltered areas of rocky reefs at a depth range of 3 to 21 m (10 to 69 ft) and reaches 9 cm (3.5 inches) in total length. The species is reported to be monogamous.
