= Canthigaster aziz =

Scientific classification
- Kingdom: Animalia
- Phylum: Chordata
- Class: Actinopterygii
- Division: Teleostei
- Order: Tetraodontiformes
- Family: Tetraodontidae
- Genus: Canthigaster
- Species: C. aziz

Binomial name
- Canthigaster aziz Matsuura, Bogorodsky, Mal & Alpermann 2020

Species of fish

Canthigaster aziz, known as Aziz's toby is a species of pufferfish in the family Tetraodontidae. It was described based on a single specimen collected from the northern Red Sea off of Saudi Arabia. It was trawled from a depth of 315 m (1033 ft), which is reportedly the second highest depth at which any fish of the genus Canthigaster has been collected. The only known specimen measures 2 cm (0.8 inches) SL. The species was named after the King Abdulaziz University. It is thought to have been collected over a hard substrate as the trawling gear used to collect it was severely damaged during operation.

Evolutionarily, C. aziz belongs to a unique and newly discovered lineage of Canthigaster, being phylogenetically distinct from all of its congeners.
