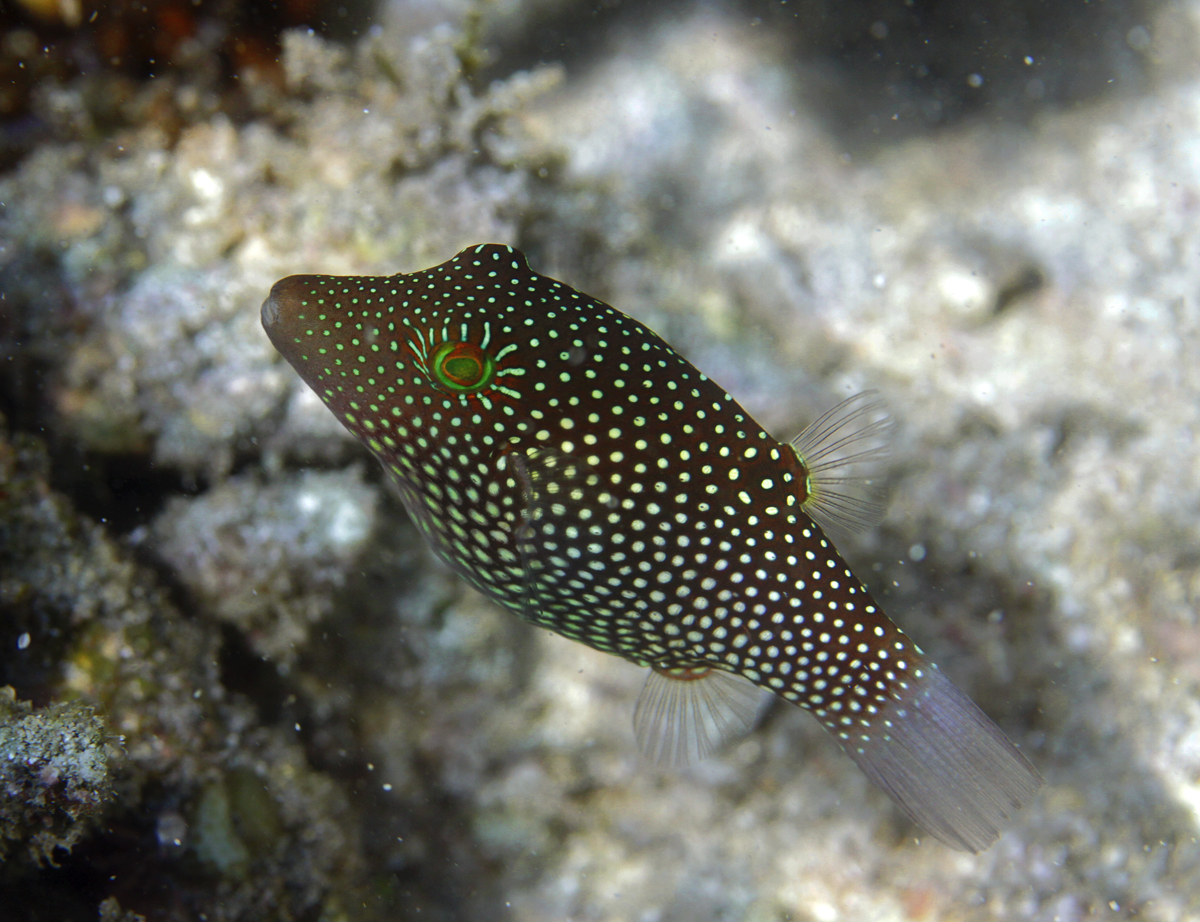

Conservation status
- Least Concern (IUCN 3.1)

Scientific classification
- Domain: Eukaryota
- Kingdom: Animalia
- Phylum: Chordata
- Class: Actinopterygii
- Order: Tetraodontiformes
- Family: Tetraodontidae
- Genus: Canthigaster
- Species: C. janthinoptera

Binomial name
- Canthigaster janthinoptera (Bleeker, 1855)

Synonyms
- Canthigaster janhinopterus; Canthigaster janthinopera; Canthigaster janthinopterus; Tropidichthys janhinopterus

= Canthigaster janthinoptera =

Species of pufferfish

Canthigaster janthinoptera, known as the honeycomb toby, is a species of pufferfish in the family Tetraodontidae. It is native to the Indo-Pacific, where it can be found along the east coast of Africa south to South Africa's Eastern Cape province, east to Oeno Island and the Line and Marquesas Islands, north to Japan, and south to Lord Howe Island. It is replaced by its relative C. jactator near the Hawaiian Islands and by C. punctatissima in the Eastern Pacific. It occurs in reef environments, often near sponges, at a depth range of 1 to 30 m (3 to 98 ft), and it reaches 9 cm (3.5 inches) in total length. The species is reported to feed on sponges, polychaetes, and algae, in addition to small quantities of tunicates, crustaceans, echinoderms and corals. It is an oviparous species usually encountered alone or in pairs.
