= Canthigaster punctata =

Conservation status
- Data Deficient (IUCN 3.1)

Scientific classification
- Kingdom: Animalia
- Phylum: Chordata
- Class: Actinopterygii
- Division: Teleostei
- Order: Tetraodontiformes
- Family: Tetraodontidae
- Genus: Canthigaster
- Species: C. punctata

Binomial name
- Canthigaster punctata Matsuura, 1992

Species of fish

Canthigaster punctata is a species of pufferfish in the family Tetraodontidae. It is a tropical marine species known only from the Mascarene Submarine Ridge in the Indian Ocean. It is reportedly oviparous.
