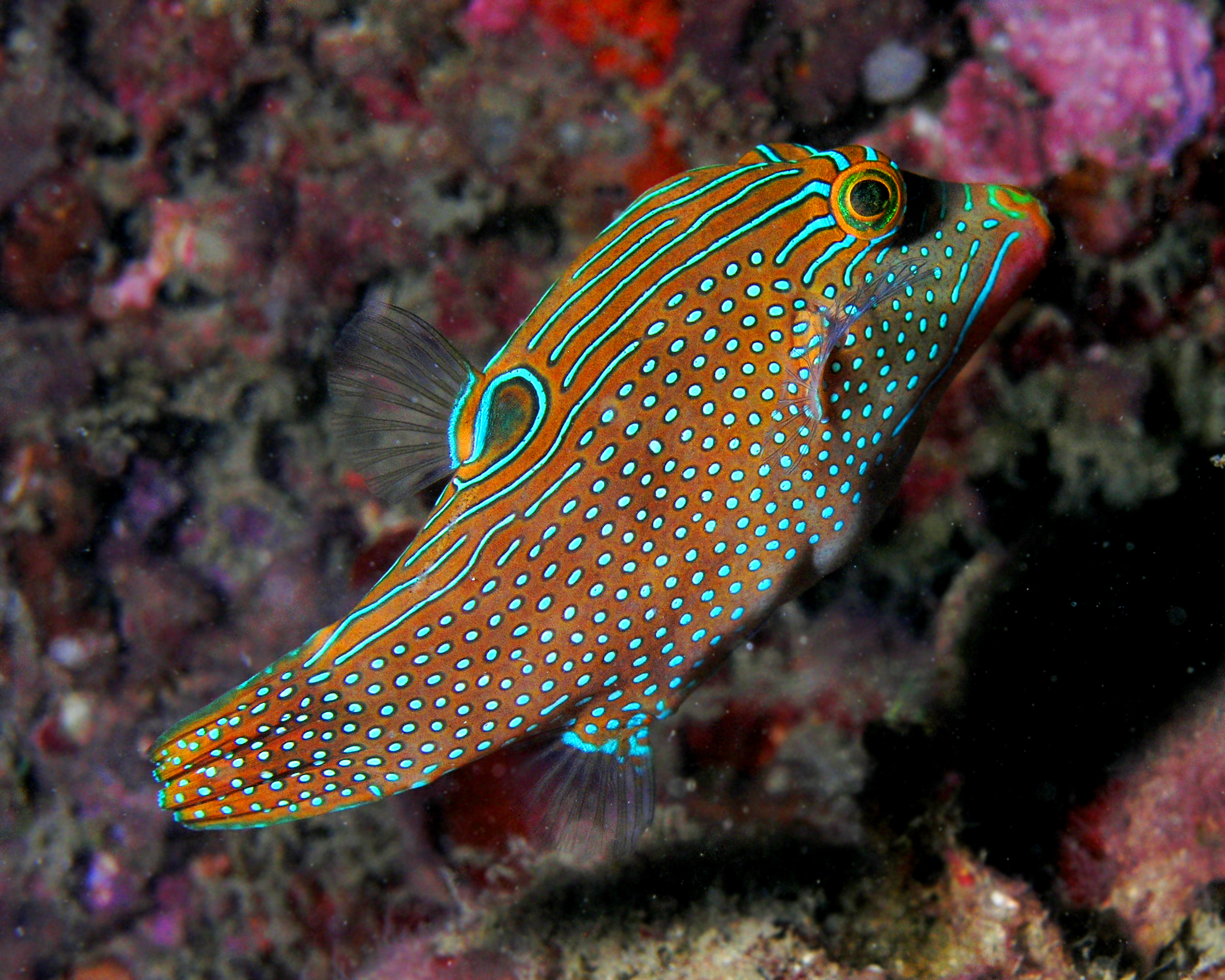

Conservation status
- Least Concern (IUCN 3.1)

Scientific classification
- Kingdom: Animalia
- Phylum: Chordata
- Class: Actinopterygii
- Order: Tetraodontiformes
- Family: Tetraodontidae
- Genus: Canthigaster
- Species: C. solandri

Binomial name
- Canthigaster solandri (Richardson, 1845)

Synonyms
- Canthigaster australis; Canthigaster glaucospilotus; Canthigaster saipanensis; Cathigaster solandri; Tetrodon solandri

= Canthigaster solandri =

Species of fish

Canthigaster solandri, commonly known as the spotted sharpnose puffer, is a ray-finned species of fish in the pufferfish family. It grows to a length of 11.5 centimeters (4.5 inches) in total length. It lives in the tropical Indo-Pacific: from East Africa to the Line Islands and the Tuamotus, north to the Ryukyu Islands, south to New Caledonia and Tonga, to the Hawaiian Islands. This species, like other members of the family Tetraodontidae, demonstrates the ability to rapidly fill itself up like a water balloon, to protect itself from predators. The skin of this species is known to be poisonous.
