= Canthigaster amboinensis =

- At Réunion

Conservation status
- Least Concern (IUCN 3.1)

Scientific classification
- Kingdom: Animalia
- Phylum: Chordata
- Class: Actinopterygii
- Division: Teleostei
- Order: Tetraodontiformes
- Family: Tetraodontidae
- Genus: Canthigaster
- Species: C. amboinensis

Binomial name
- Canthigaster amboinensis (Bleeker, 1864)

Synonyms
- List: Psilonotus amboinensis; Tropidichthys oahuensis; Tropidichthys psegma; Canthigaster polyophthalmus

Species of fish

Canthigaster amboinensis, commonly known as the Ambon pufferfish, the Ambon toby, or the spider-eye puffer, is a species of pufferfish of the family Tetraodontidae. The species is commonly seen in the tropical Indo-Pacific Ocean, including Australia, Indonesia, Japan, Papua New Guinea, Taiwan and the Hawaiian Islands.

The species is named after the island of Ambon in Indonesia.

== Description ==
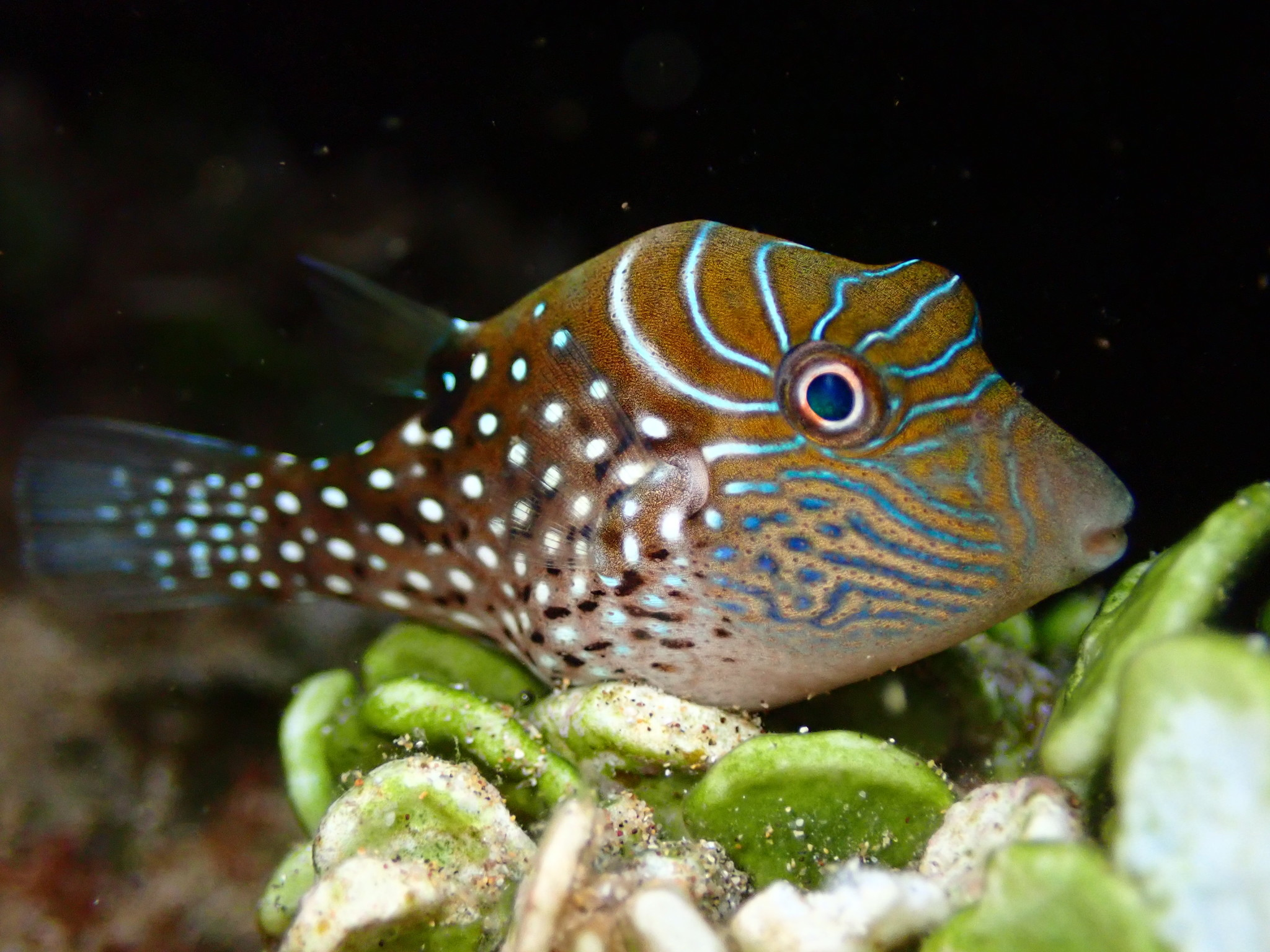
In Hawaii

The species can reach a total length of 15 cm (5.9 inches). It can be identified by its dark brown base color, blue-green lines radiating from the eyes, dark blue spots and lines on the cheeks, and iridescent light blue to white spots on head and body, which are absent from the anus to its lower jaw.

C. amboinensis is overall a rather rotund fish, but it is known to be a fast swimmer that can be hard to approach.

One of over 30 species within the genus Canthigaster, C. amboinensis is rarely included in research studies and can be difficult to differentiate from other, related species.

== Habitat ==
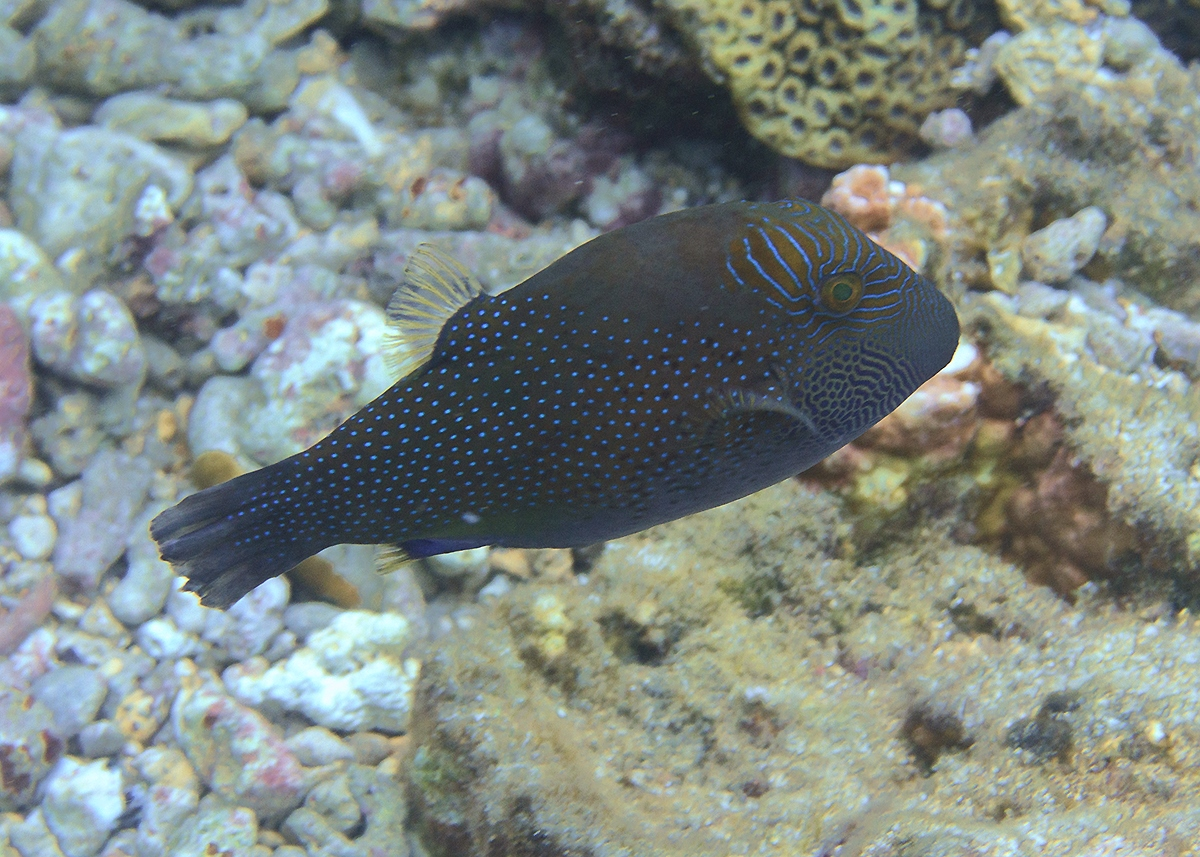
At Réunion

Pairs are usually found around boulders in shallow areas close to shore and on reef patches, with females usually occupying 25 m^{2} and males 100–175 m^{2}. Juveniles of the species are known to be secretive and are usually only seen in holes in the vicinity of outer reef flats and reef margins.

== Diet ==
A research study of C. amboinensis off of Oahu, Hawaii found that they have a diverse diet. They found 43.6% of algae, 12.7% of polychaetes, 4.7% of gastropods, and 3.2% unidentified in their stomachs.

== Reproduction ==
The male tend to fertilize eggs as they hover near the nesting area in which a female is laying its eggs. Within one spawning site, the female lays her eggs for about 20–30 seconds. Females of C. amboinensis are reported to have about five different spawning bouts that last about 45–80 seconds each.
