= Canthigaster rostrata =

Conservation status
- Least Concern (IUCN 3.1)

Scientific classification
- Kingdom: Animalia
- Phylum: Chordata
- Class: Actinopterygii
- Division: Teleostei
- Order: Tetraodontiformes
- Family: Tetraodontidae
- Genus: Canthigaster
- Species: C. rostrata

Binomial name
- Canthigaster rostrata (Bloch, 1786)

Species of fish

Canthigaster rostrata, commonly known as the Caribbean sharp-nose puffer, is a pufferfish from the Western Central Atlantic. The Caribbean sharp-nose puffer is a small fish with a maximum length of 12 cm or approximately 4.7 inches. It can be encountered from the coast of South Carolina to Venezuela, including Bermuda, the Gulf of Mexico, and in the Caribbean Sea. They can live up to 10 years in the wild, females typically live longer due to aggressive male territory behavior. The Caribbean sharp-nose puffer is a highly toxic species of marine fish due to the presence of tetrodotoxin in its tissues and organs. Despite its toxicity, the sharp-nose pufferfish occasionally makes its way into the aquarium trade.

== Naming ==
The name Canthigaster rostrata comes from the Latin words "gaster" meaning belly or stomach and "rostrata" meaning beaked.

In Mexico, Canthigaster rostrata is commonly known as "tamborín narizón" or big-nosed tambourine, an homage to its large pointed snout and rounded body shape.

== Taxonomy ==
The Caribbean sharp-nose puffer is a member of the genus Canthigaster within the Tetraodontidae family. Members of this genus are distinguished from other puffers by their uniquely pointed snout or "sharp nose".

== Description ==
In the Caribbean

The Caribbean sharp-nose puffer is a small fish that is roughly the size of a soft ball at its maximum length of about 4 inches. The color of the puffer is typically white with a darker brown dorsal area. It is adorned with bright blue spots, and its yellow caudal tail fin is bordered by a darker line.

Like most Tetraodontidae, the Caribbean sharp-nose puffer is a slow-swimmer due to its non-streamlined and boxy body shape. To swim, it moves by oscillation of the median fins which propel the fish forward through the water. The pectoral fins serve to lessen the resistance of the water felt by the swimming puffer.

== Habitat and distribution ==
The Caribbean sharp-nose puffer has been observed within a range stretching from South Carolina to the Southern Caribbean. They are typically found at depths above forty meters, however their maximum depth is ninety meters. It is most commonly observed in coral reefs, however they have also been observed in seagrass beds and other shallow marine habitats. Males of the species dominate large territories that contain the smaller territories of one to six females. Males are able to mate with the females within their territory. Smaller males are often wanderers, with no home territory. They are abundant within the Western Atlantic, however they are experiencing a slight decline in population due to coral reef loss.

== Natural defenses ==
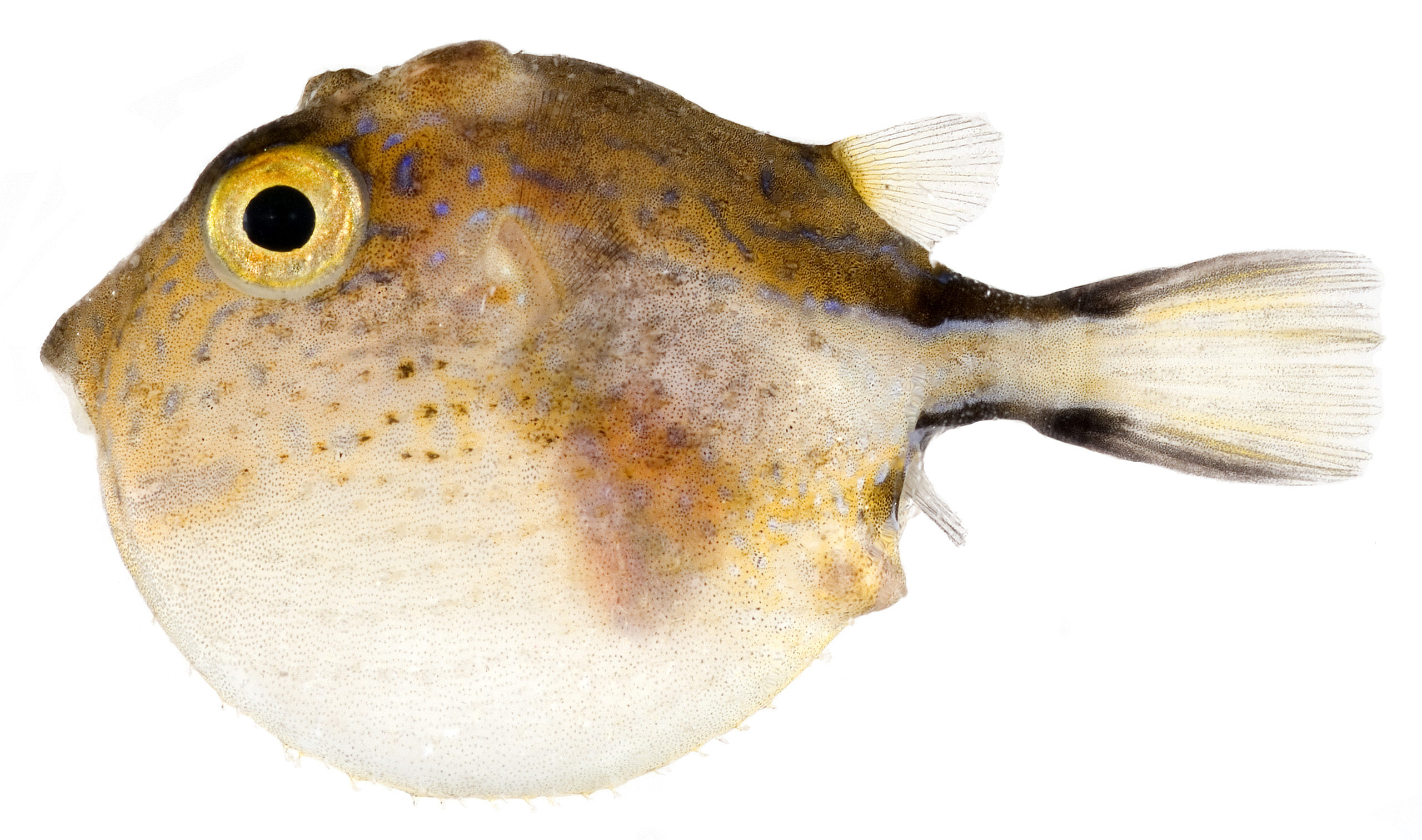
Inflated Canthigaster rostrata

To accommodate its slow locomotion the Caribbean sharp-nose puffer fish has several natural defense mechanisms that protect it from predators.

One important defensive adaptation common to most puffer species, including the Caribbean sharp-nose puffer, is its ability to self-inflate. Once thought to result from a puffer holding its breath, an inflated puffer is actually not full of air, but instead water that is gulped into the puffer's expandable stomach when threatened. This highly specialized ability is thanks to the puffer's unique body morphology, including the absence of ribs, which allow the puffer to expand its body size up to three times its normal, deflated size.

Unlike most marine teleosts, the Caribbean sharp-nose puffer does not have scales, but is instead protected by a covering of small spines, known as dermal spinules, that serve to deter predators and protect the puffer from becoming an easy meal. These spinules are scattered around the puffer's body, but lie most concentrated on the puffer's abdomen.

In addition to being a tough meal to swallow, the Caribbean sharp-nose puffer is a potentially lethal choice of prey due to the presence of dangerous toxins: Tetrodotoxin and Saxitoxin in the tissues of the puffer. Saxitoxin is a neurotoxin that is one of many paralytic shellfish poisons that is believed to originate in marine dinoflagellates. The toxin is known to accumulate in the cells of filter feeders like shrimp, a prey item of the Caribbean sharp-nose puffer, who ingest the toxic bacteria. Saxitoxin will then bioaccumulate in the tissues of animals further up the food-chain until near toxic levels. This neurotoxin is believed to cause the death of sea turtles as it has been found in high amounts in the stomach contents of deceased sea turtles who have recently eaten the Caribbean sharp-nose puffer, a host of saxitoxin.

== Predation ==
Few animals are able to overcome the threat posed by the specialized defenses of Caribbean sharp-nose puffer, and thus it is not a common meal for most marine predators. Predation of Canthigaster rostrata is believed to be opportunistic. Nevertheless, species that have been observed to prey on this species of puffer include the great barracuda and the red lionfish. Remains of Caribbean sharp-nose puffer has also been found in stomach contents of the green sea turtle.

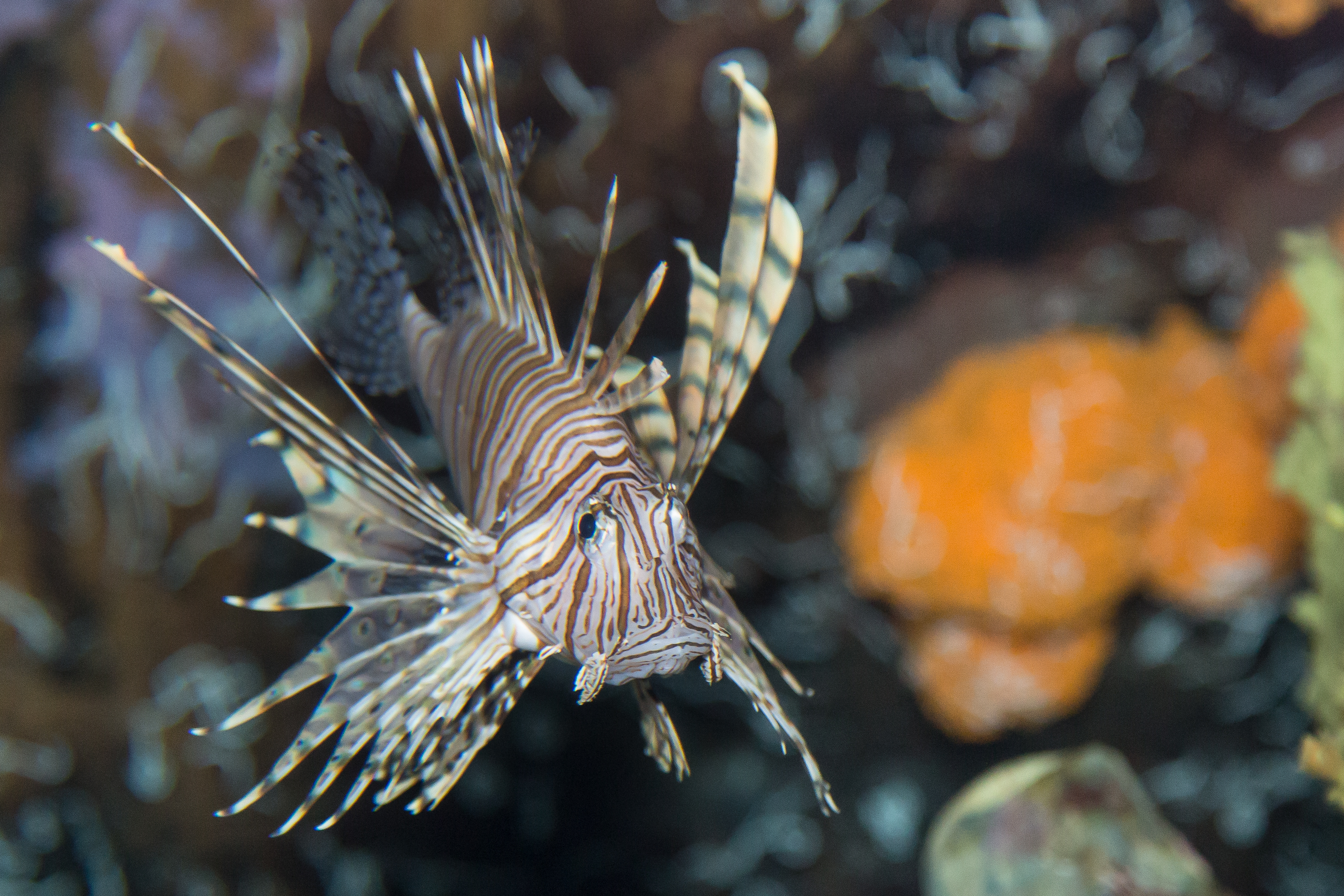
Red lionfish (Pterois volitans)

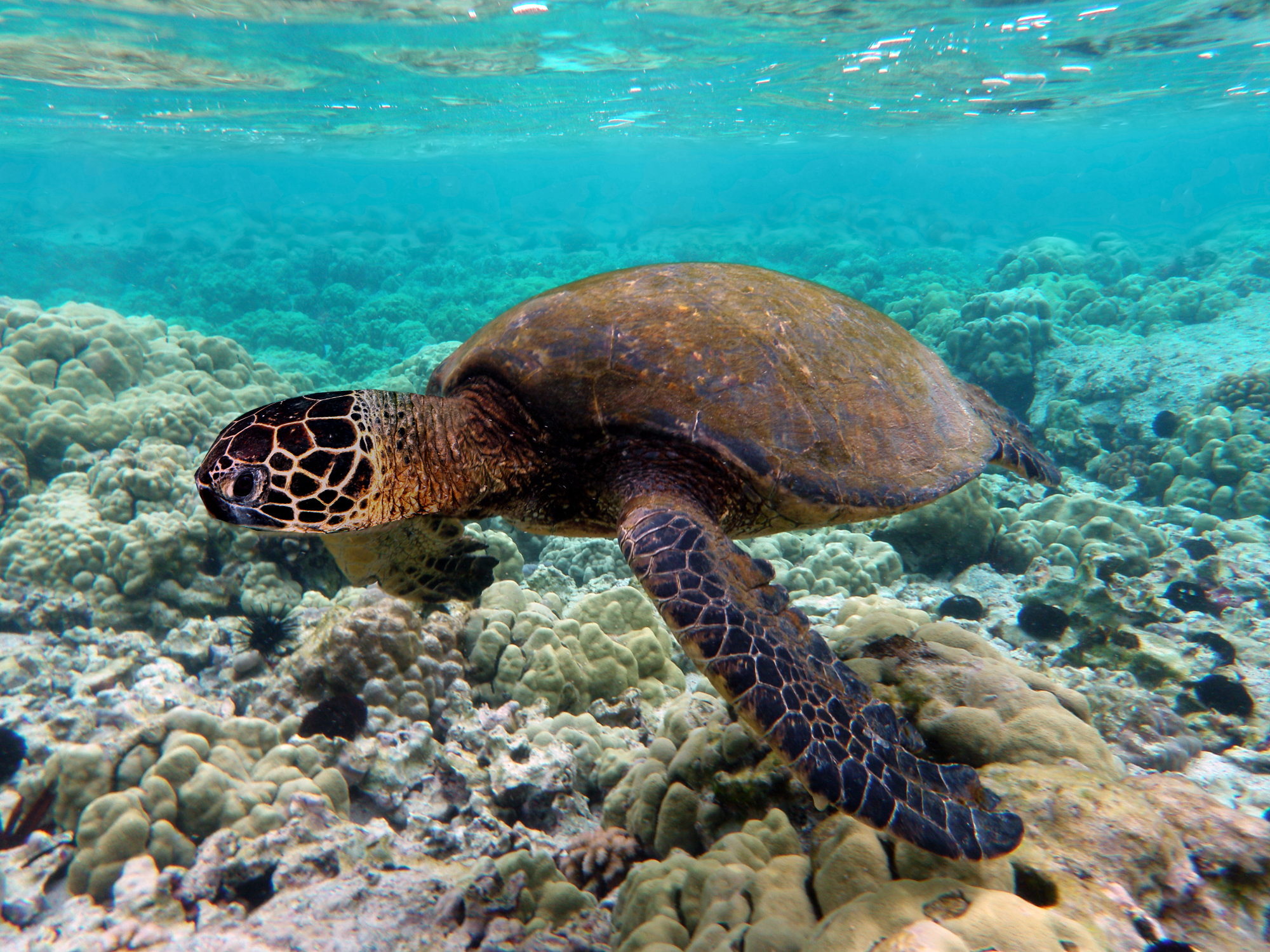
Green sea turtle (Chelonia mydas)

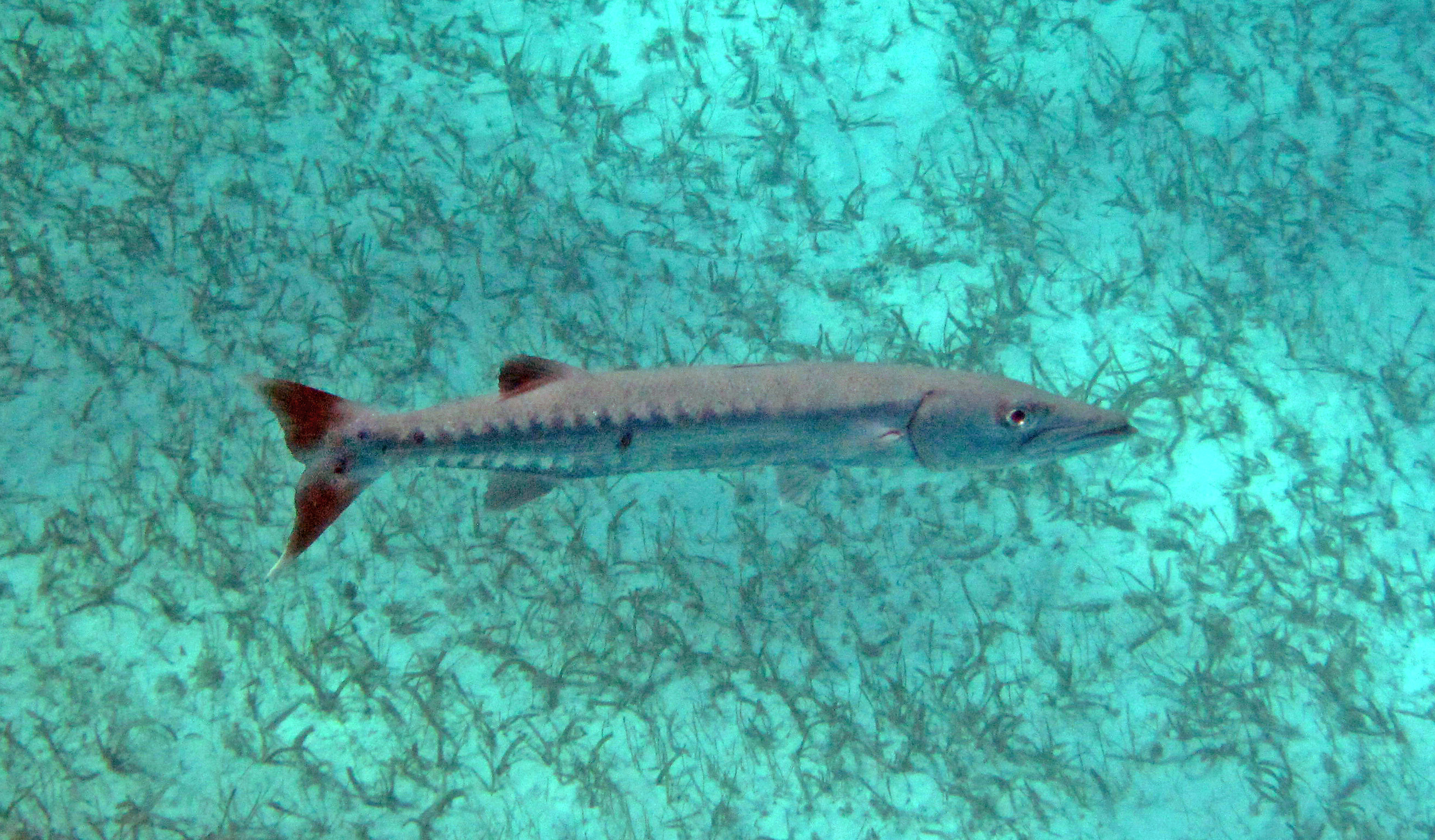
Great barracuda (Sphyraena barracuda)

== Diet ==
The Caribbean sharp-nose puffer is an omnivore. Much of its diet consists of spermatophytes and sponges. However, it is also known to consume seagrasses, algae, polychaete worms, shrimps, crabs, gastropods, worms, soft coral, sea-stars, sea-cucumbers, and urchins.

== Mating and parental care ==
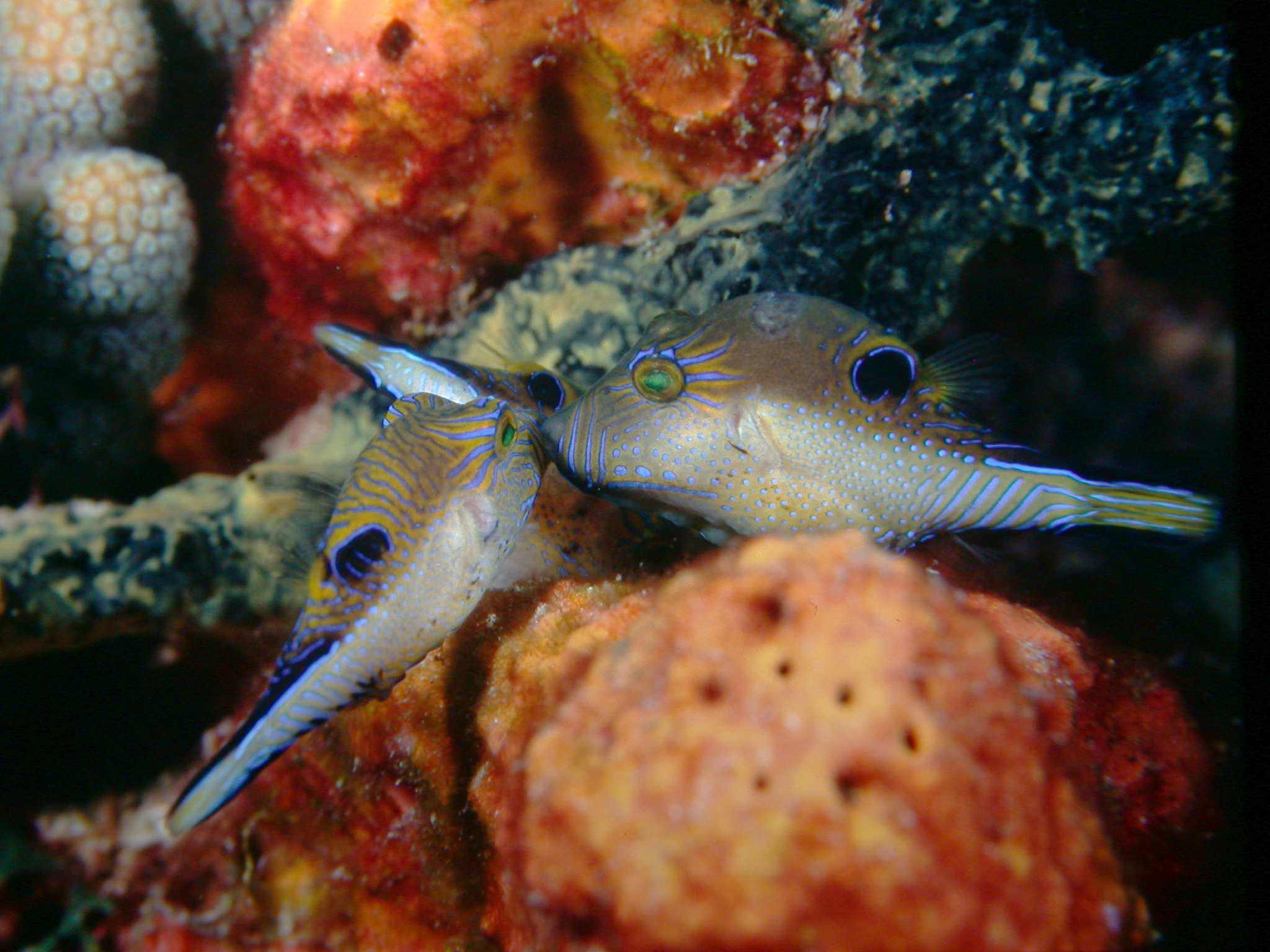
Canthigaster rostrata pair

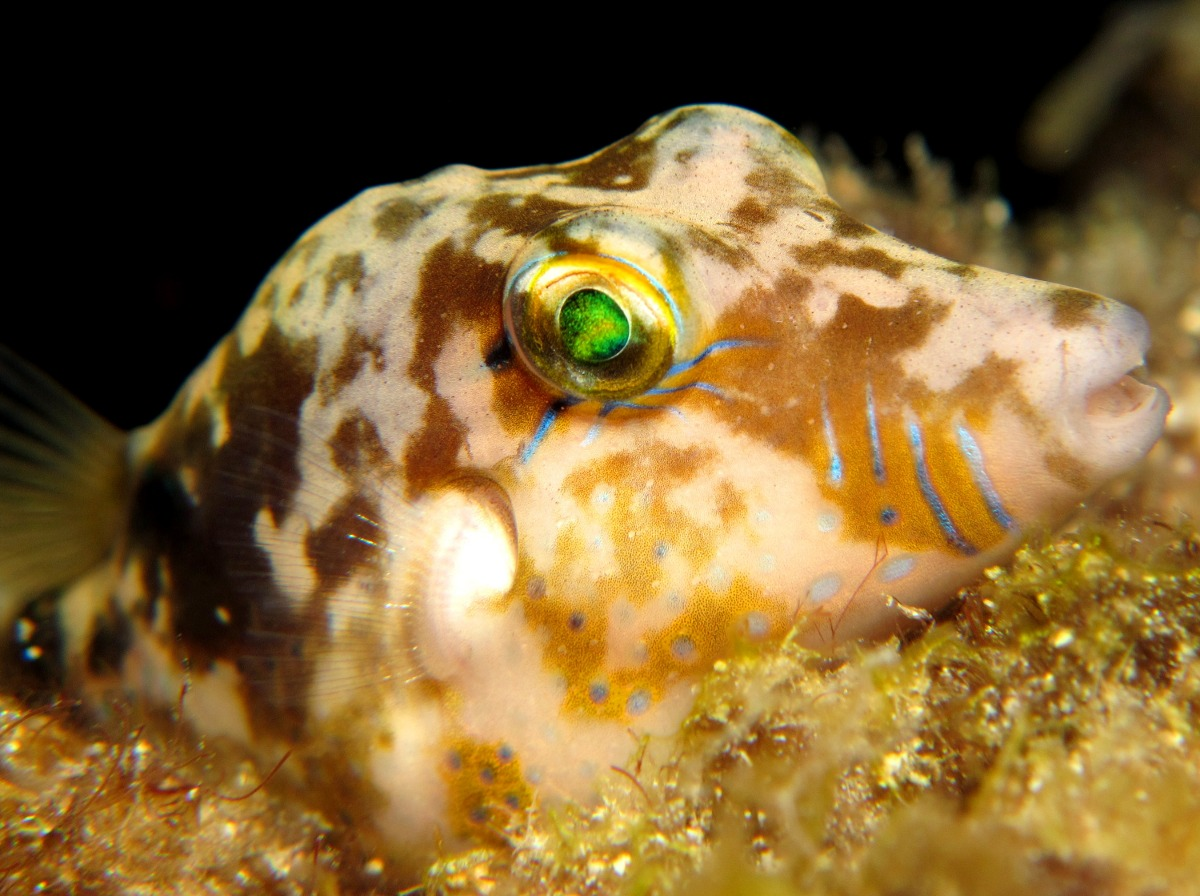
Mottled coloration

The Caribbean sharp-nose puffer is oviparous, meaning that the female lays eggs and the embryo develops externally. The typical mating season occurs during the spring, with the majority of spawning occurring at dawn. In order to mate, the male enters the female's territory and performs a display of spreading his fins. If the female is interested in mating, she will display a mottled color pattern, a submissive gesture.

During reproduction the female releases a cluster of eggs onto the sand or into an algae nest, typically in a seagrass bed. This is then fertilized externally by the male puffer. The eggs are transparent and spherical in shape.

They are a polygynous species, one male mates with multiple females. The male mates with the females that live within his territory. While the eggs are developing, they are protected by the female and the algae nest, within her territory. After the eggs are hatched, both parents demonstrate no parental care.

== Social behavior ==
Males of the species are extremely territorial. When entering another male's territory, puffer's will flatten themselves and display a mottled coloration as a sign of submission. If a territorial male spots another male within his territory, the defending male will puff up to appear larger, spread his fins, and tilt its body forward. If these warning signs are unsuccessful, the defending male will circle and attempt to bite the other fish. Smaller males of the species often lack a territory, and are known as wanderers.
