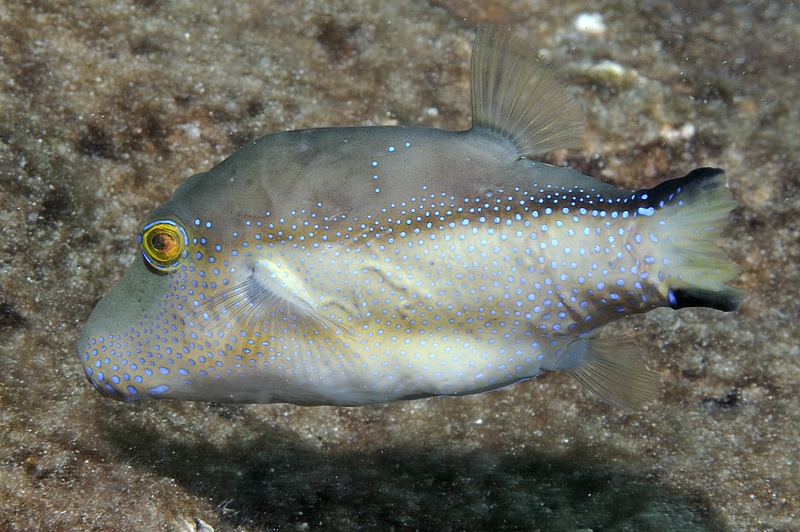

Conservation status
- Least Concern (IUCN 3.1)

Scientific classification
- Kingdom: Animalia
- Phylum: Chordata
- Class: Actinopterygii
- Division: Teleostei
- Order: Tetraodontiformes
- Family: Tetraodontidae
- Genus: Canthigaster
- Species: C. capistrata

Binomial name
- Canthigaster capistrata (Lowe, 1839)

Synonyms
- Tetrodon capistratus

= Canthigaster capistrata =

Species of fish

Canthigaster capistrata, known as the Macaronesian sharpnose-puffer, is a species of pufferfish in the family Tetraodontidae. It is native to the Eastern Atlantic, where it is known to occur near oceanic islands. Recently several juvenile specimens have been observed in the Mediterranean, precisely in the Alboran Sea. The species reaches at least 13 cm (5.1 inches) in total length.

== Identification ==
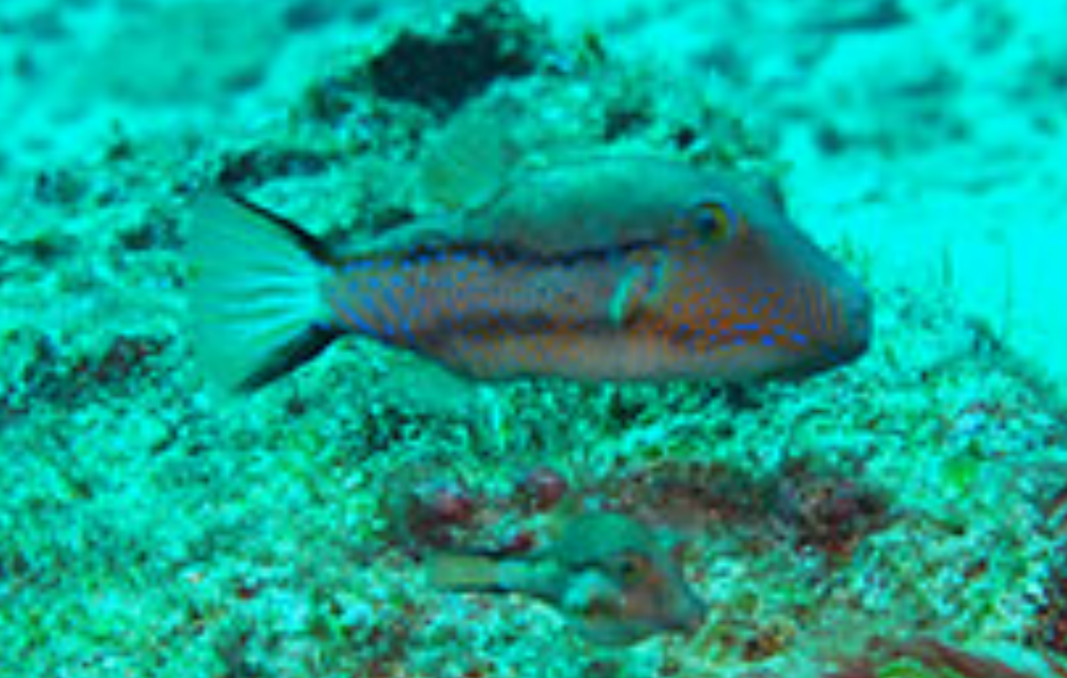
An image of Canthigaster capistrata.

Tetradontidae is the name of the pufferfish family. Within Tetradontidae there are two subfamilies: the Tetraodontinae and the Canthigasterinae family. Canthigaster capistrata belongs to the Canthigasterinae subfamily, which are known for their laterally compressed bodies, pointed snouts, and small gill openings. Bold and bright color patterns color their bodies to display and warn predators of their tetrodotoxin, a lethal toxin that is found within Tetradontidae.

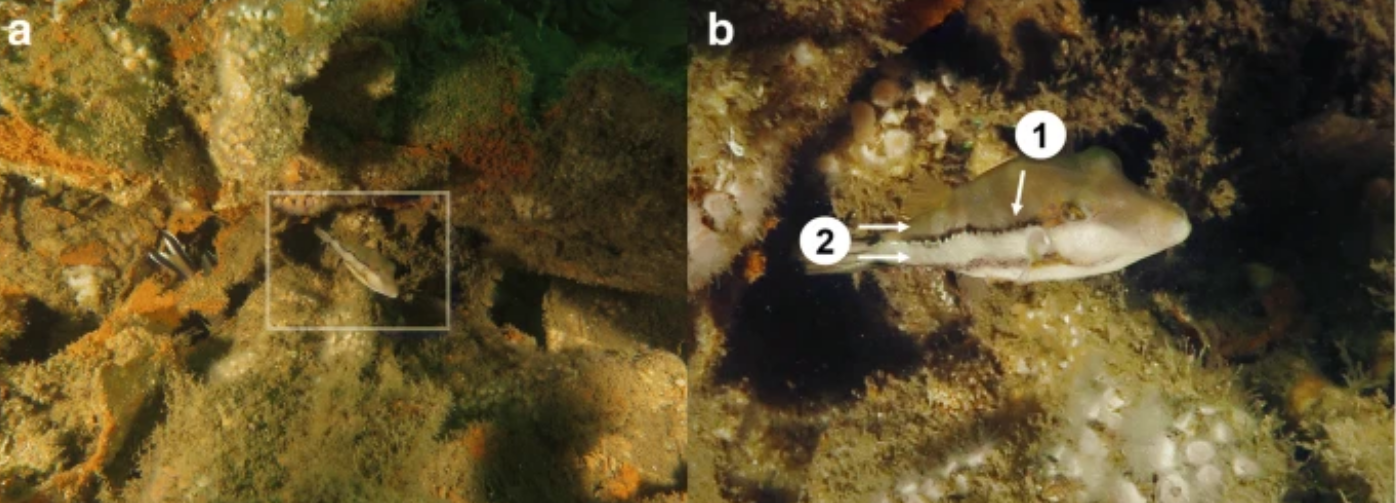
The identifying characteristics of C. capistrata

Only recently has C. capistrata been acknowledged as its own species. Previously, it had been classified as a junior synonym to the species C. rostrata. Identifying characteristics that help to individualize C. capistrata includes counts of 9-10 dorsal rays, 9 anal fin rays, and 14-16 pectoral rays per fin. In addition, C. capistrata is noted to have a tan body, with darker regions on the dorsal and ventral side. The body of the fish is spotted throughout with the exception of the area ventral to the pectoral fins. C. capistrata also has a distinct dark long stripe from the caudal peduncle up to the pectoral fin. This fish is speckled, with gray, blue, and bright blue dots and even bars on the snout of this puffer’s snout.

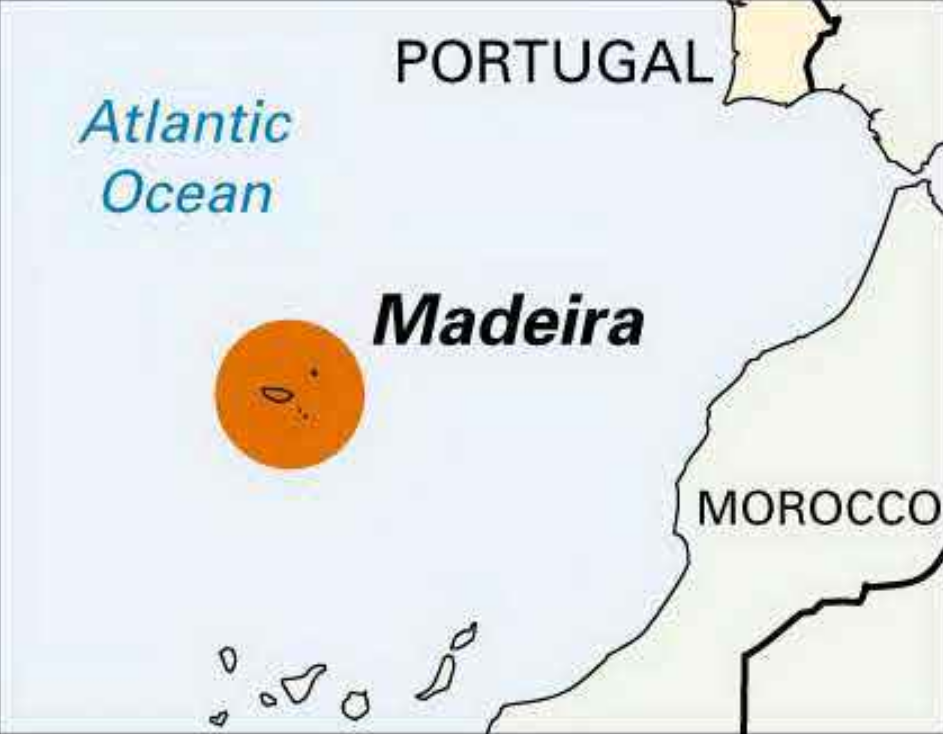
Map of the Madeira Island in the East Atlantic, where C. capistrata are known to be native.

To tell between this fish and others in the genus, note that this fish lacks a spot near the dorsal fin as well as a dark strip that other members of canthigaster would have, like its close relative, C. rostrata, which has these identifying features. This stripe that is found in other species extends from the caudal fin margin into the caudal peduncle. Another helpful for identification would be a dark, longitudinal strip that can be found starting from the caudal-fin margin up to the base of the pectoral fin. Another identifying feature would be a drastic color contrast between the dorsal and central side of the fish, between the previously mentioned longitudinal stripe. The dorsal region tends to be darker, and lacks as many blue dots in contrast to the ventral region. This species has a heavy and blunt body, with both the dorsal and anal fins farther back on the body of the fish. The fish lacks pelvic fins, which is a feature in the genus Canthigaster. The jaws of C. capistrata form a beak-like shape, with the eyes centered posteriorly on the head of the fish. The caudal tail of the fish is described as truncated or slightly rounded. As a defense mechanism, the fish produces a toxin, lethal to other fish. The toxins produced by this fish is known as tetrodotoxin, although some species also may produce saxitoxins, or both. The distribution of this toxin varies from species to species. Alluding to the toxins that this fish produces are the brightly colored speckles on the species, serving as an aposematic warning to predators. The toxin can be found and had been extracted from the muscles, liver, intestine, and other organs of the fish in studies.

Canthigaster capistrata is native to the East Atlantic sea. This specimen has been found in the Madeira islands, Azore islands, Selvagen islands, Canary islands, and Cape Verde Archipelago. The species is noted to have a broader distribution in Macaronesia, and used to be known as a Macaronesian endemic species.

They inhabit rock, coral, seagrass meadows and seaweed bottoms, and can be found in depths of 1–40 meters. Some individuals can also be found near shipwrecks according to data collected from various studies.

Canthigaster capistrata are prevalent and also native to the Azores, which are proximate to the Mid-Atlantic Ridge. Natural colonization via currents frequently occurs in the Azores, since the Azores were only recently formed, relative to time. There appears to be little cases of species introduction and invasion on these islands, likely due to geographic isolation. The warming of the seas seems to be shifting C. capistrata populations further northward into the Azores.

== Life History and Biology ==
There is still little known regarding the social dynamics and reproduction in this genus. Most current studies have been conducted on C. capistrata’s sister species, C.rostrata and another 2 species of the genus, C. valentini and C. punctatissima . Despite that, similarities within the studied genus shows that the species within the genus are all typically benthic foragers in their natural habitats consisting of coral and rocky bottoms.

To determine age and life histories, researchers have utilized fin clips to figure out genetic information and aging. Other researchers have also utilized length-weight relationships to discover life history details, fish health and condition, and information about fish growth and morphological differences between regions.

All studied species also are sexually dimorphic, with male individuals being larger than females. Between species, there are differing social systems within the genera. This includes systems of territorial harems and polygyny. Other species are also known to depository unguarded demursal eggs, sometimes with the formation of algal nests by females in certain species.

Pufferfish in the genus Canthigasterae all have some form of toxin, however the amount and distribution of the toxic in their bodies may vary between both genera and species. The toxins produced can be either tetrodotoxin and/or saxitoxins.

== Conservation Status ==
Based on spatial ecology research in the Canary Islands, it has been suggested that the presence of Canthigaster capistrata is both frequent and abundant. To add, the IUCN list also notes that this species of Canthigasteridae is of least concern, however, the current conservation status, whether it be decreasing, increasing, or stable, is still unknown.

The species can be put in marine aquariums and in the aquarium market but isn’t noted to be avidly sought after, likely due to toxicity and high maintenance.

== Taxonomy ==
Canthigaster capistrata is classified under Kingdom Animalia, Phylum Chordata, Class Actinopterygii, under the Order Tetraodontiformes, and under the Family Tetraodontidae.
