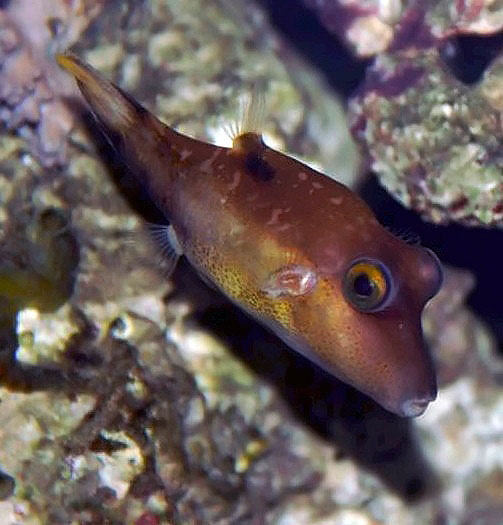

Conservation status
- Endangered (IUCN 3.1)

Scientific classification
- Kingdom: Animalia
- Phylum: Chordata
- Class: Actinopterygii
- Division: Teleostei
- Order: Tetraodontiformes
- Family: Tetraodontidae
- Genus: Canthigaster
- Species: C. sanctaehelenae

Binomial name
- Canthigaster sanctaehelenae (Günther, 1870)

Synonyms
- Tetrodon sanctaehelenae

= Canthigaster sanctaehelenae =

Species of fish

Canthigaster sanctaehelenae, known as the St. Helena sharpnose pufferfish, is a species of pufferfish in the family Tetraodontidae. It is native to the Southeast Atlantic, where it is known only from the islands of St. Helena and Ascension. It is a reef-associated species that occurs in tidal pools and rocky areas at depths of 50 m (164 ft) or less. Adults of the species are usually seen in pairs. It reaches 6.7 cm (2.6 inches) SL. It differs from other Atlantic Canthigaster species in patterning, with neither longitudinal dark stripes on the body or caudal peduncle nor a conspicuous dark spot on the dorsum.
