= Canthigaster leoparda =

Conservation status
- Least Concern (IUCN 3.1)

Scientific classification
- Kingdom: Animalia
- Phylum: Chordata
- Class: Actinopterygii
- Order: Tetraodontiformes
- Family: Tetraodontidae
- Genus: Canthigaster
- Species: C. leoparda

Binomial name
- Canthigaster leoparda Lubbock & Allen, 1979

Species of pufferfish

Canthigaster leoparda, known as the leopard sharpnose puffer, is a species of pufferfish in the family Tetraodontidae. It is native to the Indo-Pacific, ranging from Christmas Island to the Philippines, Ambon, and Guam. It occurs at a depth range of 30 to 50 m (98 to 164 ft), and it is usually found in the vicinity of drop-offs and caves. It reaches 7.5 cm (3 inches) SL and is often seen either alone or in pairs. The species is known to be oviparous.
