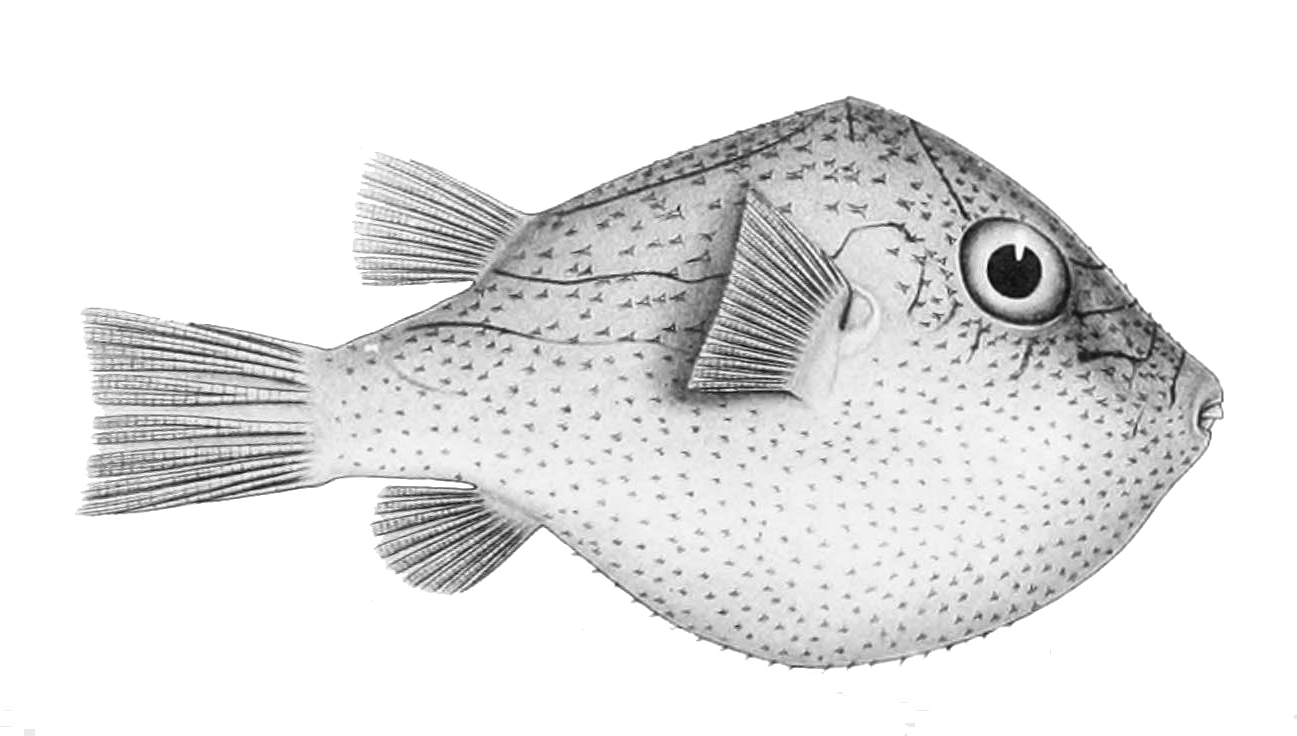

Conservation status
- Data Deficient (IUCN 3.1)

Scientific classification
- Kingdom: Animalia
- Phylum: Chordata
- Class: Actinopterygii
- Order: Tetraodontiformes
- Family: Tetraodontidae
- Genus: Canthigaster
- Species: C. investigatoris

Binomial name
- Canthigaster investigatoris (Annandale & Jenkins, 1910)

Synonyms
- Tropidichthys investigatoris

= Canthigaster investigatoris =

Species of pufferfish

Canthigaster investigatoris is a species of pufferfish in the family Tetraodontidae. It is an oviparous demersal species known only from Indonesia. It may occur as far down as 101 m (331 ft).
