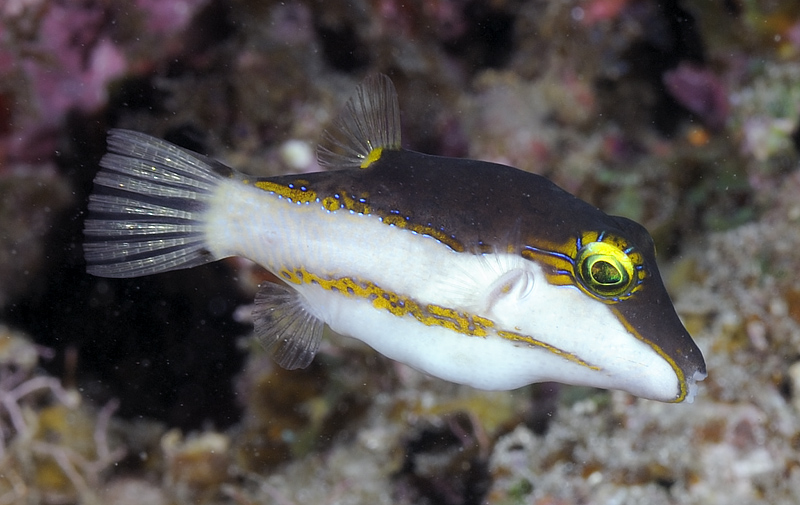

Conservation status
- Least Concern (IUCN 3.1)

Scientific classification
- Kingdom: Animalia
- Phylum: Chordata
- Class: Actinopterygii
- Order: Tetraodontiformes
- Family: Tetraodontidae
- Genus: Canthigaster
- Species: C. smithae

Binomial name
- Canthigaster smithae Allen & Randall, 1977

Synonyms
- Cathigaster smithae

= Canthigaster smithae =

Species of fish

Canthigaster smithae, known as the bicolored toby, is a species of pufferfish in the family Tetraodontidae native to the Indian Ocean. It ranges from Agaléga, Mauritius to Durban, South Africa, as well as the Maldives. It is a reef-associated species found at a depth of 20 to 40 m (66 to 131 ft), where it typically occurs alone near rubble and steep rock walls. It is oviparous and reaches 13 cm (5.1 inches) in total length.
