= Canthigaster marquesensis =

Conservation status
- Vulnerable (IUCN 3.1)

Scientific classification
- Kingdom: Animalia
- Phylum: Chordata
- Class: Actinopterygii
- Order: Tetraodontiformes
- Family: Tetraodontidae
- Genus: Canthigaster
- Species: C. marquesensis

Binomial name
- Canthigaster marquesensis Allen & Randall, 1977

Species of pufferfish

Canthigaster marquesensis is a species of pufferfish in the family Tetraodontidae. It is known only from Nuku Hiva in the Marquesas Islands, where it is found at a depth range of 15 to 42 m (49 to 138 ft). It is a reef-associated marine species that reaches 7.1 cm (2.8 inches) SL. It feeds on algae and small invertebrates. It is known to be oviparous.
