= Canthigaster rapaensis =

Conservation status
- Endangered (IUCN 3.1)

Scientific classification
- Kingdom: Animalia
- Phylum: Chordata
- Class: Actinopterygii
- Order: Tetraodontiformes
- Family: Tetraodontidae
- Genus: Canthigaster
- Species: C. rapaensis

Binomial name
- Canthigaster rapaensis G. R. Allen & J. E. Randall, 1977

Species of fish

Canthigaster rapaensis is a species of fish in the family Tetraodontidae. It is endemic to French Polynesia.
