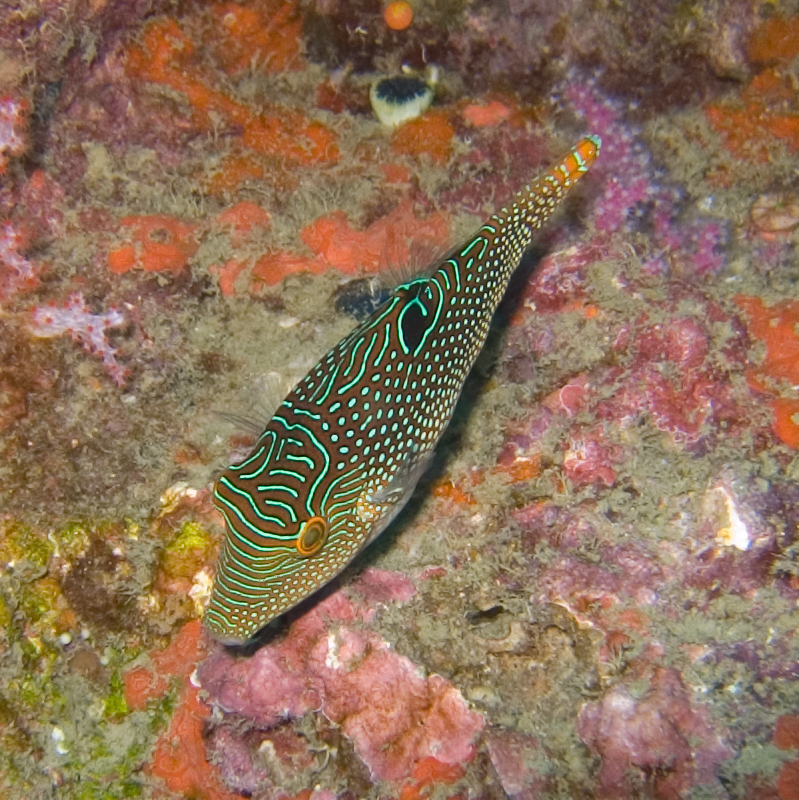

Conservation status
- Least Concern (IUCN 3.1)

Scientific classification
- Kingdom: Animalia
- Phylum: Chordata
- Class: Actinopterygii
- Order: Tetraodontiformes
- Family: Tetraodontidae
- Genus: Canthigaster
- Species: C. compressa

Binomial name
- Canthigaster compressa (Marion de Procé, 1822)

= Canthigaster compressa =

Species of fish

Canthigaster compressa, also known as the compressed toby or fingerprint toby, is a demersal Marine fish belonging to the family Tetraodontidae.

The fingerprint toby is a small sized fish which grows up to 12 cm.

It is widely distributed throughout the tropical waters of the western Pacific Ocean.

It inhabits the shallow sandy to silty lagoons, harbours or channels from 2 to 12 m. Canthigaster compressa has a diurnal activity.
