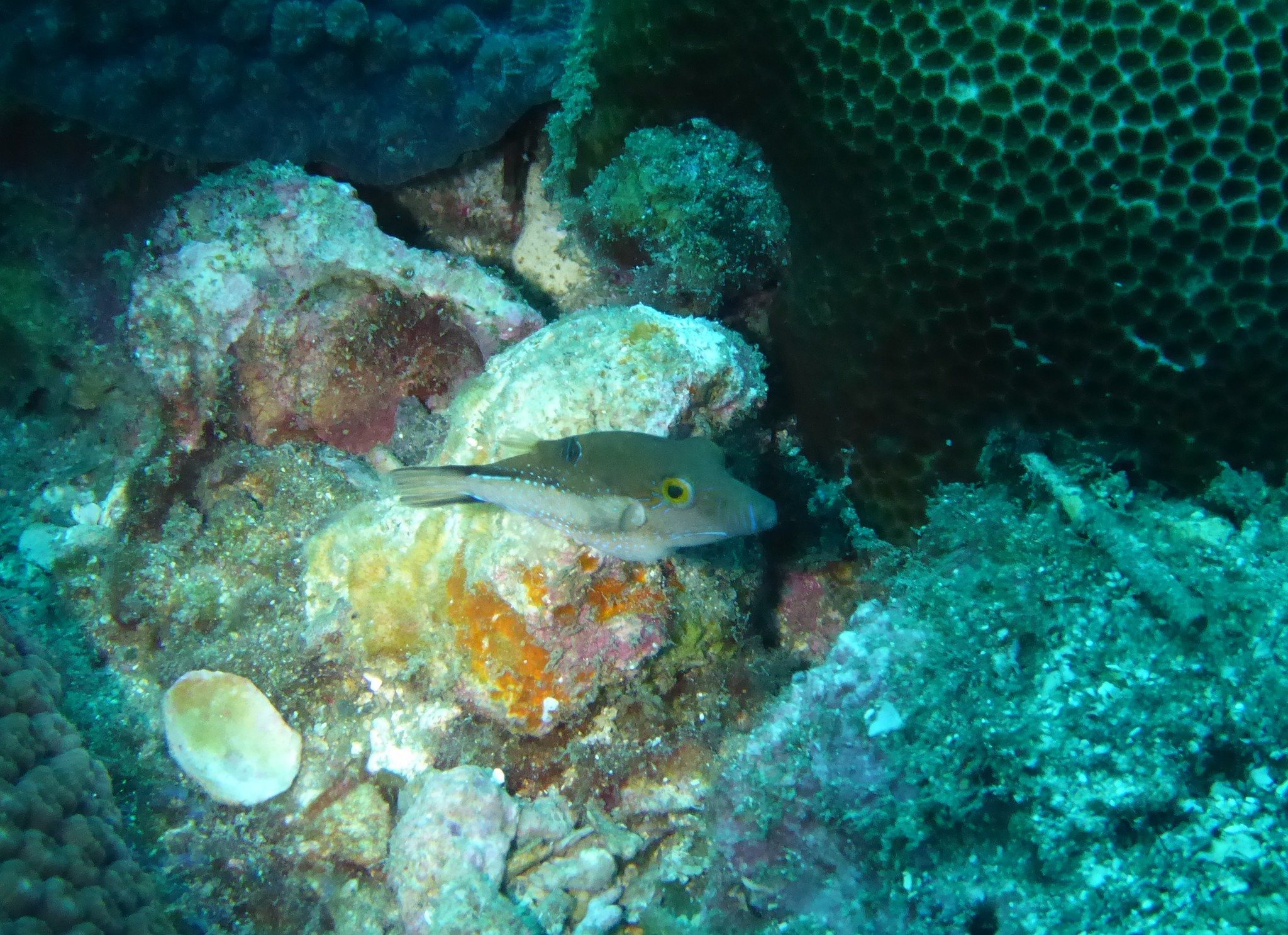
- West African sharpnose puffer seen off the coast of Sao Tomé

Conservation status
- Least Concern (IUCN 3.1)

Scientific classification
- Kingdom: Animalia
- Phylum: Chordata
- Class: Actinopterygii
- Order: Tetraodontiformes
- Family: Tetraodontidae
- Genus: Canthigaster
- Species: C. supramacula

Binomial name
- Canthigaster supramacula R. L. Moura & R. M. C. Castro, 2002

= Canthigaster supramacula =

Species of fish

Canthigaster supramacula, known as the West African sharpnose-puffer, is a species of marine fish in the family Tetraodontidae. It was first isolated from the coast of central Africa, in the Atlantic Ocean. It is named in reference to the conspicuous ocellus-like spot on its side, anterior to its dorsal fin's base.

== Description ==
Canthigaster supramacula can measure up to 3.9 centimetres (1.5 in), counting with no dorsal spines, possessing 10 dorsal soft rays and 9 anal soft rays. It shows a conspicuous dark spot resembling an ocellus on the dorsal portion of its trunk, the dorsal portion of which extends towards its dorsal fin. It lacks dark stripes along the sides of the body like some of its cogenerate species, bearing two to four lines that extend from the caudal peduncle through the dorsal fin's base .

== Distribution ==
The species is reef-associated. It is known from the Eastern Central Atlantic, first collected from off Côte d'Ivoire and Ghana.
