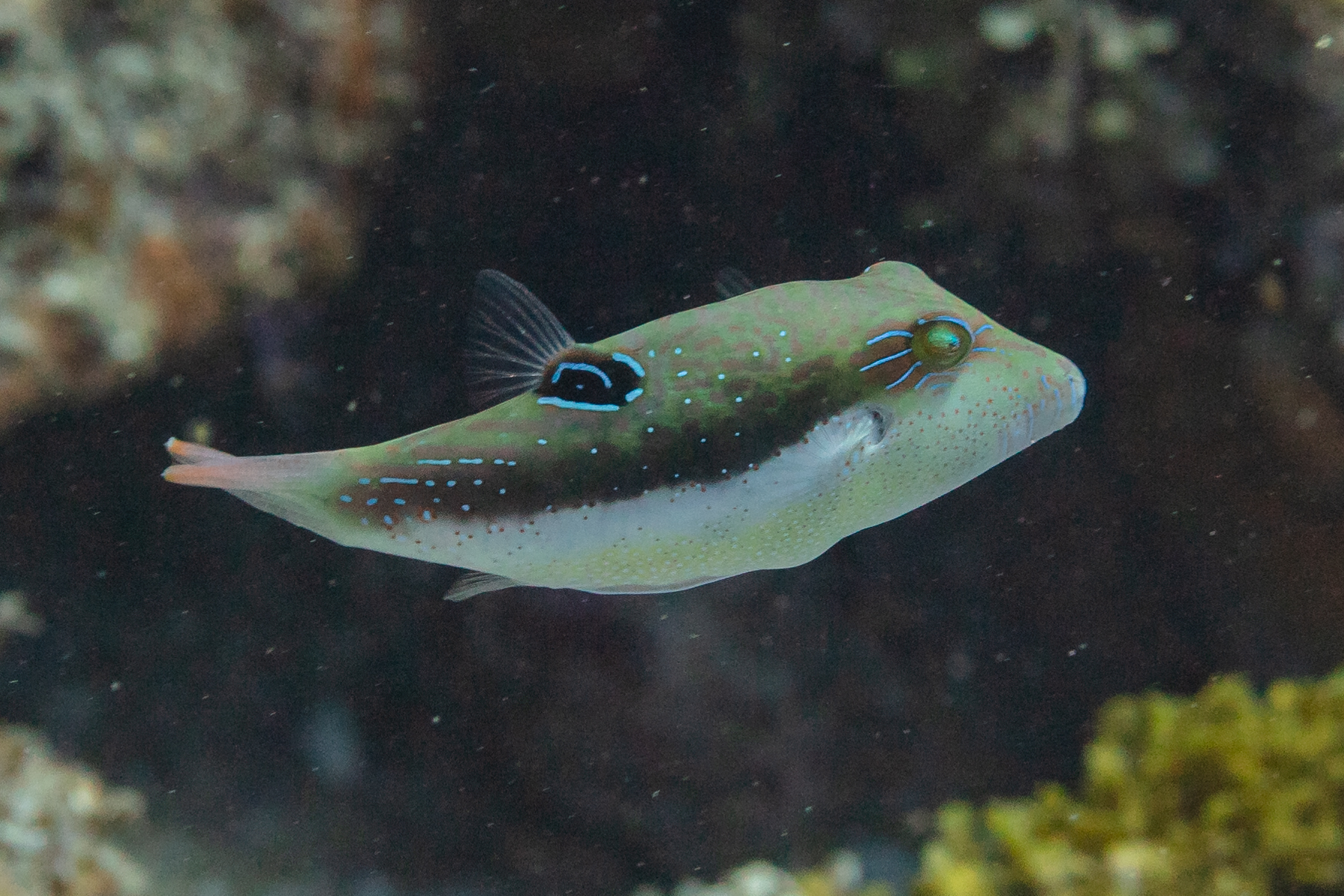

Conservation status
- Least Concern (IUCN 3.1)

Scientific classification
- Domain: Eukaryota
- Kingdom: Animalia
- Phylum: Chordata
- Class: Actinopterygii
- Order: Tetraodontiformes
- Family: Tetraodontidae
- Genus: Canthigaster
- Species: C. bennetti

Binomial name
- Canthigaster bennetti (Bleeker, 1854)

= Canthigaster bennetti =

Species of fish

Canthigaster bennetti is a pufferfish from the Indo-Pacific. It occasionally makes its way into the aquarium trade. It grows to a size of 10 cm in length.
