= Canthigaster tyleri =

Conservation status
- Least Concern (IUCN 3.1)

Scientific classification
- Kingdom: Animalia
- Phylum: Chordata
- Class: Actinopterygii
- Division: Teleostei
- Order: Tetraodontiformes
- Family: Tetraodontidae
- Genus: Canthigaster
- Species: C. tyleri

Binomial name
- Canthigaster tyleri (G. R. Allen & J. E. Randall, 1977 )

Species of fish

Canthigaster tyleri, also known as Tyler's toby, is a species of marine fish in the family Tetraodontidae.

== Description ==
The Tyler's toby possesses a globular body while being also a bit compressed laterally. It's a small sized fish, reaching 9 cm maximum in length. Its snout is elongated with a small terminal mouth. The background coloration is whitish, the sides are covered with red spots, the back is yellow to green with a network of blue lines from the caudal fin to the tip of the snout. Blue lines are parallel on the top of the snout. A white circle not closed on its top surrounds the eye. The belly is white and fins are translucent.

== Etymology ==
The puffer is named in honor of plectognath taxonomist James C. Tyler (b. 1935), who sent Allen and Randall the first specimen of this fish from the Comoro Islands in the Indian Ocean.

== Distribution & habitat ==
Canthigaster tyleri has a limited distribution in the Indian Ocean, it occurs in all the islands from western Indonesia to Tanzania. It has a preference for reef and lagoons where it can easily hide in holes and crevasses, it has a very secretive behavior. It can be found until 40 m depth.

== Biology ==
The Tyler's toby's diet is based on different kind of algae, sponge and other small invertebrates. As many of their congeners belonging to the family of Tetraodontidae, Canthigasters are toxic. Their body would have the capacity to generate from its food a powerful toxin, the tetrodotoxin, and to store it in the skin and certain internal organs like liver and gonads. The tetrodotoxin is a powerful neurotoxic substance which symptoms are serious and can lead, in the worst case, to the death by respiratory paralysis.
