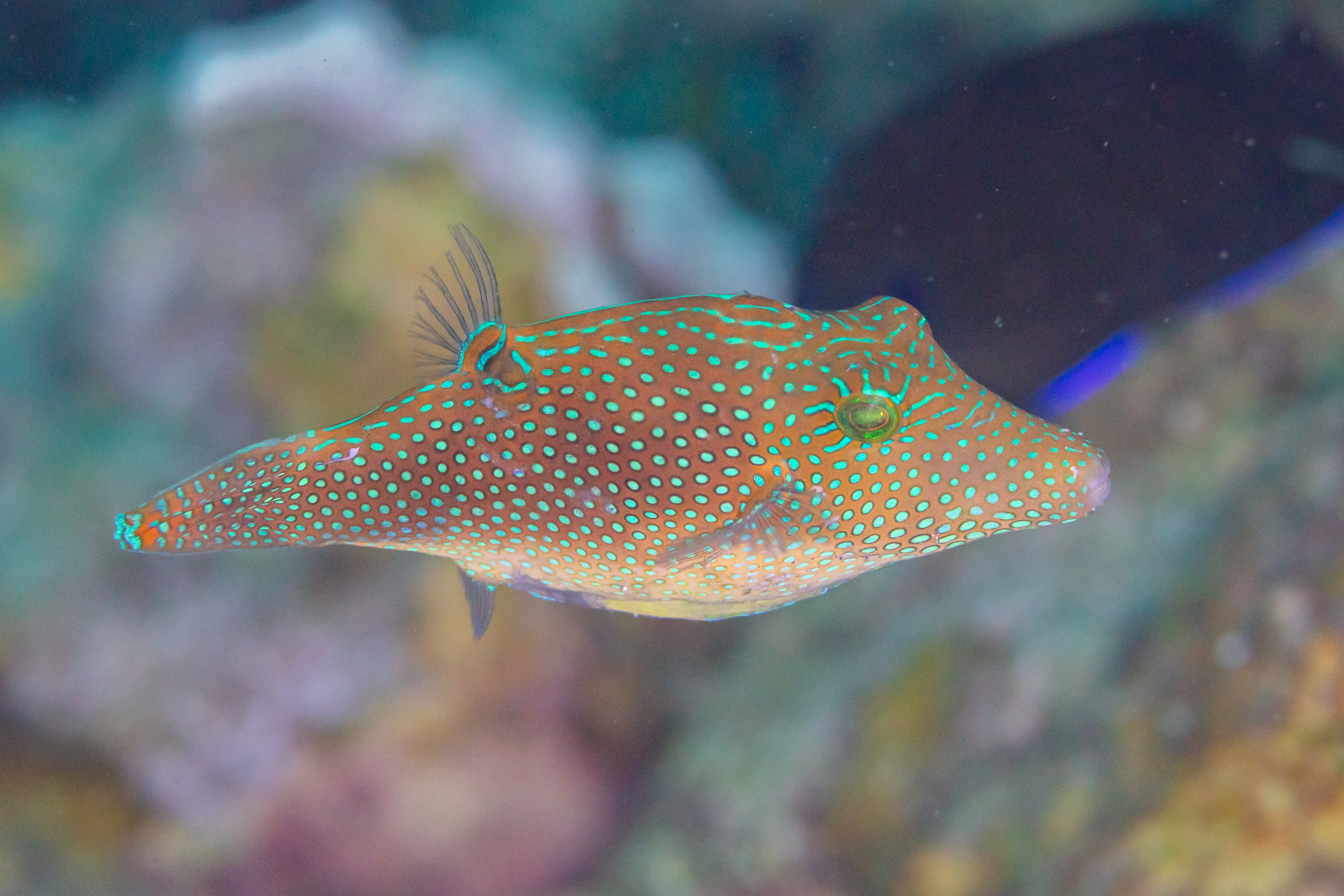

Conservation status
- Least Concern (IUCN 3.1)

Scientific classification
- Kingdom: Animalia
- Phylum: Chordata
- Class: Actinopterygii
- Order: Tetraodontiformes
- Family: Tetraodontidae
- Genus: Canthigaster
- Species: C. margaritata

Binomial name
- Canthigaster margaritata (Rüppell, 1829)

= Canthigaster margaritata =

Species of fish

Canthigaster margaritata, the pearl toby, is a species of "toby" or "sharpnose puffer" (Canthigaster), which is part of the pufferfish family, Tetraodontidae. This reef fish is found in Indo-Pacific waters, including the Red Sea.
