= Canthigaster ocellicincta =

Conservation status
- Least Concern (IUCN 3.1)

Scientific classification
- Kingdom: Animalia
- Phylum: Chordata
- Class: Actinopterygii
- Order: Tetraodontiformes
- Family: Tetraodontidae
- Genus: Canthigaster
- Species: C. ocellicincta

Binomial name
- Canthigaster ocellicincta Allen & Randall, 1977

Species of pufferfish

Canthigaster ocellicincta, commonly known as the shy toby, is a species of pufferfish in the family Tetraodontidae. It is native to the Western Pacific where it ranges from Indonesia and the Philippines to Fiji, the Ryukyu Islands, the Great Barrier Reef, and New Caledonia, although it has recently been recorded from Tonga. It occurs at a depth range of 10 to 53 m (33 to 174 ft) and reaches 7.5 cm (3 inches) SL. The species is usually seen in invertebrate-rich reef caves at more than 25 m (82 ft) depth. While generally found alone or in pairs, although small groups have been reported on at least one occasion. It is noted to be a very secretive species that feeds on algae and small invertebrates.
