= Canthigaster cyanetron =

Conservation status
- Endangered (IUCN 3.1)

Scientific classification
- Kingdom: Animalia
- Phylum: Chordata
- Class: Actinopterygii
- Order: Tetraodontiformes
- Family: Tetraodontidae
- Genus: Canthigaster
- Species: C. cyanetron

Binomial name
- Canthigaster cyanetron (Randall & Cea Egaña, 1989)

Species of fish

Canthigaster cyanetron (commonly referred to as the blue-belly toby) is a species of pufferfish of the family Tetraodontidae. The species is endemic to Easter Island, and is an Endangered species due to coral reef bleaching of its habitat.
