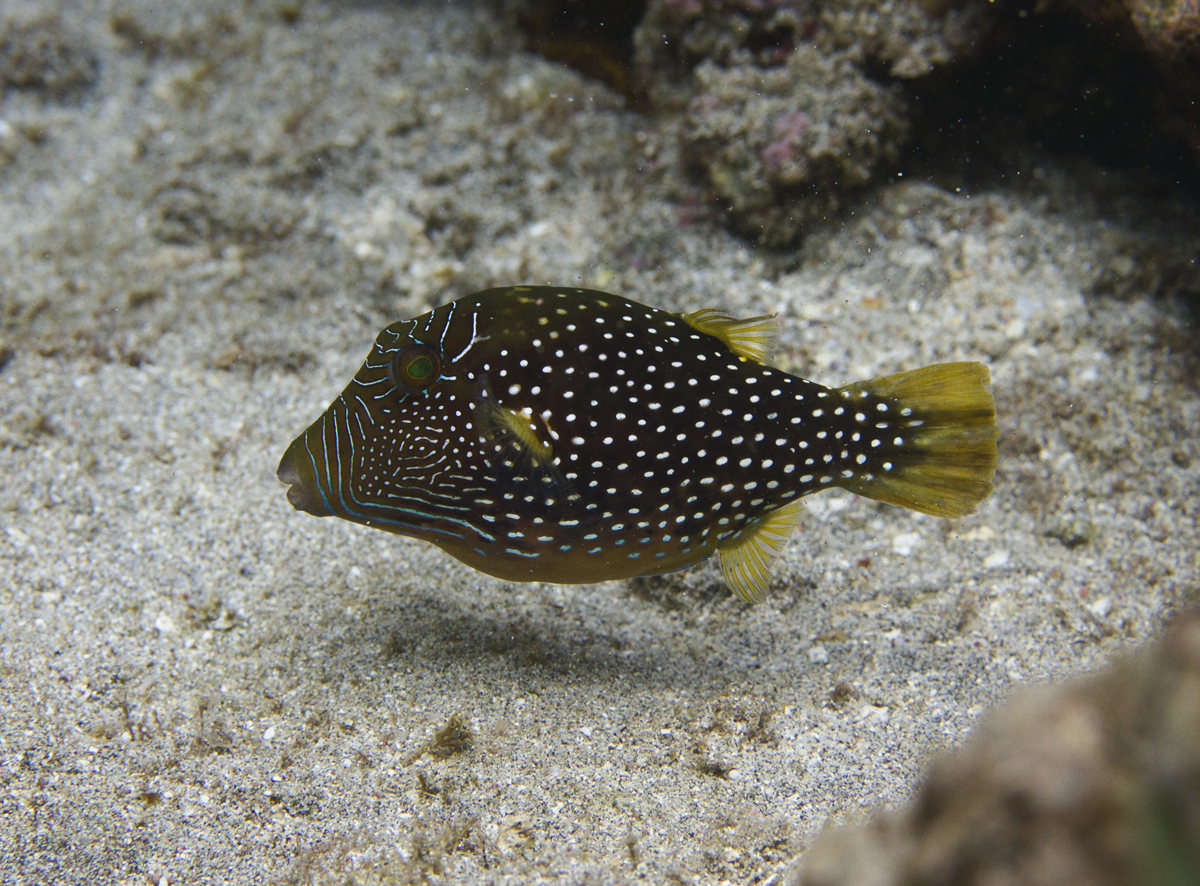

Conservation status
- Least Concern (IUCN 3.1)

Scientific classification
- Kingdom: Animalia
- Phylum: Chordata
- Class: Actinopterygii
- Division: Teleostei
- Order: Tetraodontiformes
- Family: Tetraodontidae
- Genus: Canthigaster
- Species: C. natalensis

Binomial name
- Canthigaster natalensis (Günther, 1870)

Synonyms
- Cathigaster natalensis; Tetrodon amboinensis natalensis

= Canthigaster natalensis =

Species of pufferfish

Canthigaster natalensis, known as the Natal toby, is a species of pufferfish in the family Tetraodontidae. It is native to the southwestern Indian Ocean, where it ranges from Mozambique and South Africa to Réunion and Mauritius. It is an oviparous species that reaches 8.6 cm (3.4 inches) SL.
