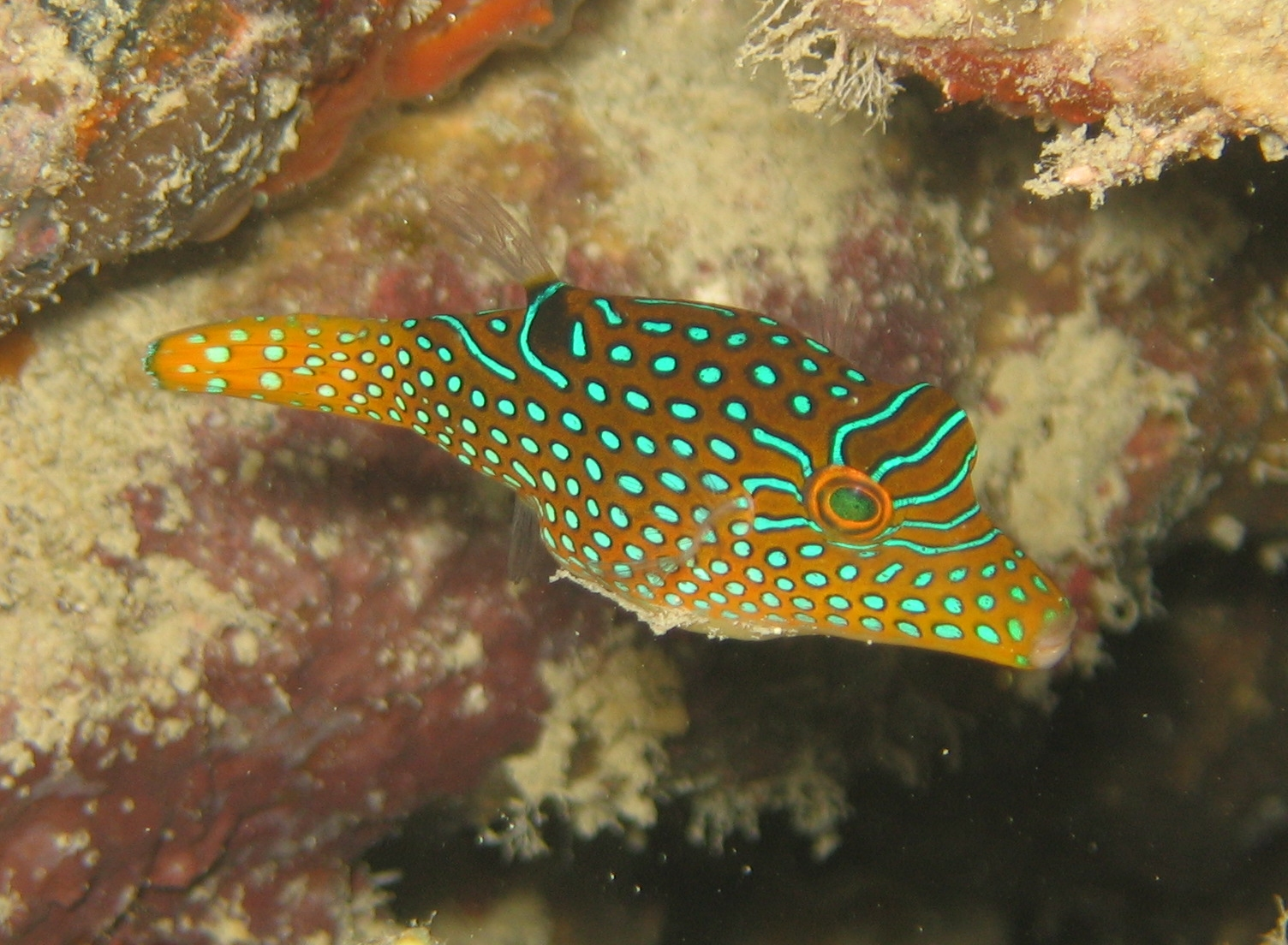

Conservation status
- Least Concern (IUCN 3.1)

Scientific classification
- Kingdom: Animalia
- Phylum: Chordata
- Class: Actinopterygii
- Order: Tetraodontiformes
- Family: Tetraodontidae
- Genus: Canthigaster
- Species: C. papua

Binomial name
- Canthigaster papua (Bleeker, 1848)

= Canthigaster papua =

Species of fish

Canthigaster papua, also known as the Papuan toby , is a demersal Marine fish belonging to the family Tetraodontidae.

The Papuan toby is a small sized fish which grows up to 10 cm.

It is widely distributed throughout the tropical waters of the Indian Ocean and of the western Pacific Ocean.

It inhabits coral reefs with clear water in lagoons and external slope even drop-off from 6 to 50 m. Canthigaster papua has a diurnal activity.

It occasionally makes its way into the aquarium trade.

== Identification ==
This species is identified as distinct from the similar Fingerprint Toby (Canthigaster compressa) by identifying the Papuan Toby (Canthigaster papua) has orange around the mouth.
