= Canthigaster criobe =

Conservation status
- Data Deficient (IUCN 3.1)

Scientific classification
- Kingdom: Animalia
- Phylum: Chordata
- Class: Actinopterygii
- Division: Teleostei
- Order: Tetraodontiformes
- Family: Tetraodontidae
- Genus: Canthigaster
- Species: C. criobe

Binomial name
- Canthigaster criobe Williams, Delrieu-Trottin & Planes, 2012

Species of pufferfish

Canthigaster criobe, known as the striped toby, is a species of pufferfish in the family Tetraodontidae. It is known only from French Polynesia, where it occurs at a depth range of 15 to 20 m (49 to 66 ft).

== Etymology ==
It was named for the Centre de Recherche Insulaire et Observatoire de l'Environnement (CRIOBE), Moorea, French Polynesia, in recognition of the laboratory's continued support of marine research in the area.

== Description ==
The holotype's length was 3.9 cm (1.5 in) SL. A subsequent specimen was 4.4 cm SL. It has multiple thin brown stripes along its body, a feature which sets it apart from its congeners.
