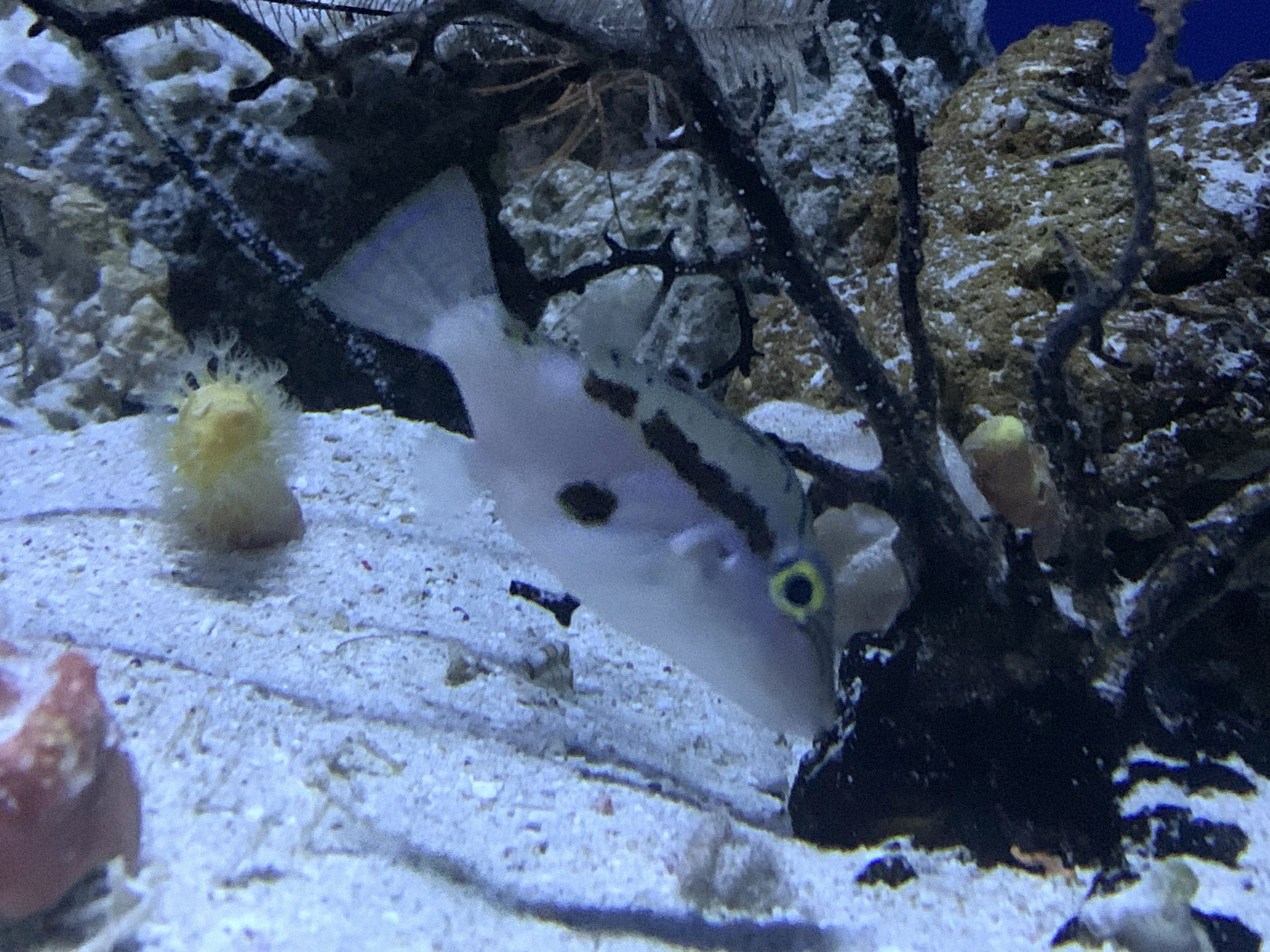

Conservation status
- Least Concern (IUCN 3.1)

Scientific classification
- Kingdom: Animalia
- Phylum: Chordata
- Class: Actinopterygii
- Order: Tetraodontiformes
- Family: Tetraodontidae
- Genus: Canthigaster
- Species: C. inframacula

Binomial name
- Canthigaster inframacula Allen & Randall, 1977

= Canthigaster inframacula =

Species of pufferfish

Canthigaster inframacula is a species of pufferfish in the family Tetraodontidae. It is native to the Pacific Ocean, where it is known from Japan, the Gulf of Tonkin, and the Hawaiian Islands. It is a benthopelagic oviparous species found at a depth range of 124 to 274 m (407 to 899 ft) and reaches 7.6 cm (3 inches) SL.
