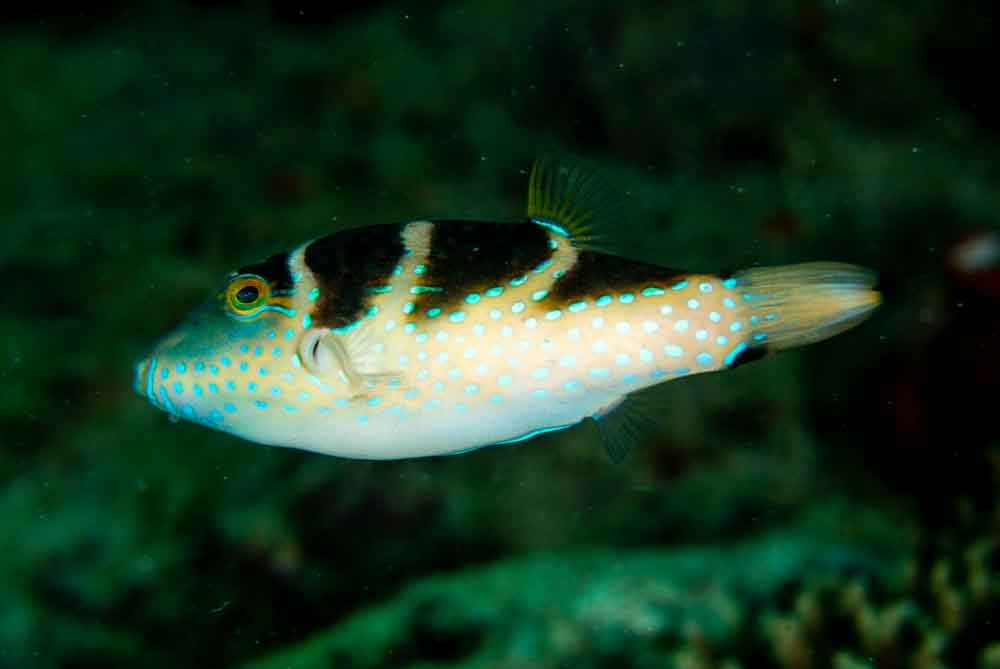

Conservation status
- Least Concern (IUCN 3.1)

Scientific classification
- Domain: Eukaryota
- Kingdom: Animalia
- Phylum: Chordata
- Class: Actinopterygii
- Order: Tetraodontiformes
- Family: Tetraodontidae
- Genus: Canthigaster
- Species: C. cyanospilota

Binomial name
- Canthigaster cyanospilota Randall, Williams & Rocha, 2008

= Canthigaster cyanospilota =

Species of fish

Canthigaster cyanospilota, commonly known as blue-spotted toby, is a species of pufferfish of the family Tetraodontidae. The species is found throughout the Indian Ocean, including the red Sea and Gulf of Aqaba. They feed on a variety of benthic invertebrates and are listed in the IUCN Red List as Least Concern.
