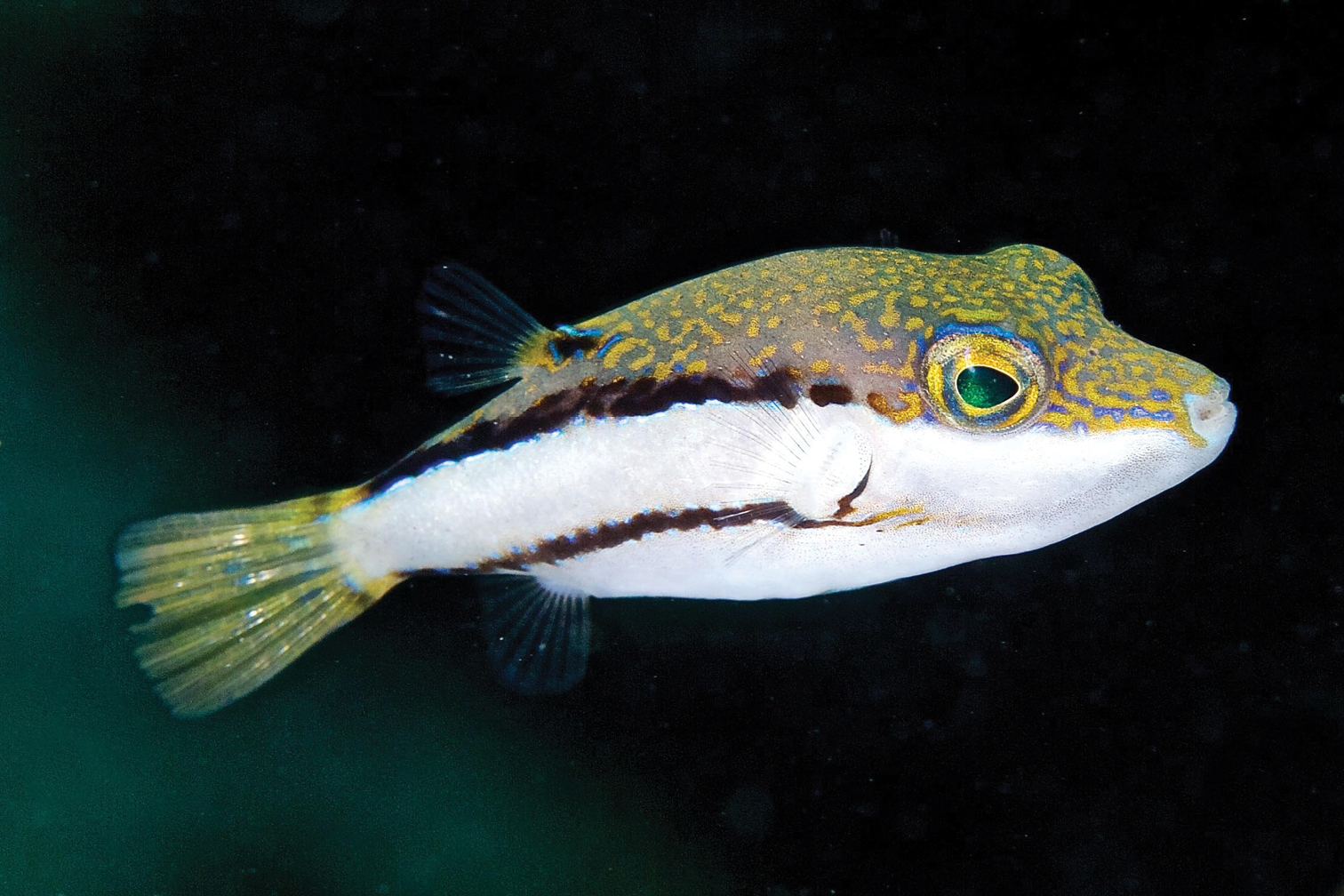

Conservation status
- Least Concern (IUCN 3.1)

Scientific classification
- Kingdom: Animalia
- Phylum: Chordata
- Class: Actinopterygii
- Order: Tetraodontiformes
- Family: Tetraodontidae
- Genus: Canthigaster
- Species: C. jamestyleri

Binomial name
- Canthigaster jamestyleri R. L. Moura & R. M. C. Castro, 2002

= Canthigaster jamestyleri =

Species of fish

Canthigaster jamestyleri, known as the goldface toby, is a species of marine fish in the family Tetraodontidae. It was first isolated from the southeast coast of the US, in the Atlantic Ocean.

== Etymology ==
It is named in honor of ichthyologist James C. Tyler (b. 1935), for his help and advice to the authors, also for his numerous contributions to the study of the systematics of the plectognath fishes.

== Description ==
C. jamestyleri can measure up to 8.5 centimetres (3.3 in), counting with 9 soft rays and anal soft rays. It shows no dark dorsal and ventral margins on its caudal fin but does show a small dark spot on the base of its dorsal fin. It also counts with bars on the caudal fin, as well as diagonal lines on the snout, and two dark stripes on the sides of its body.

== Distribution ==
The species is deep reef-associated, with a depth range between 90 and 100 metres (300 and 330 ft). It is found in the Western Atlantic, particularly on the southeast coast of the US and the Gulf of Mexico.
