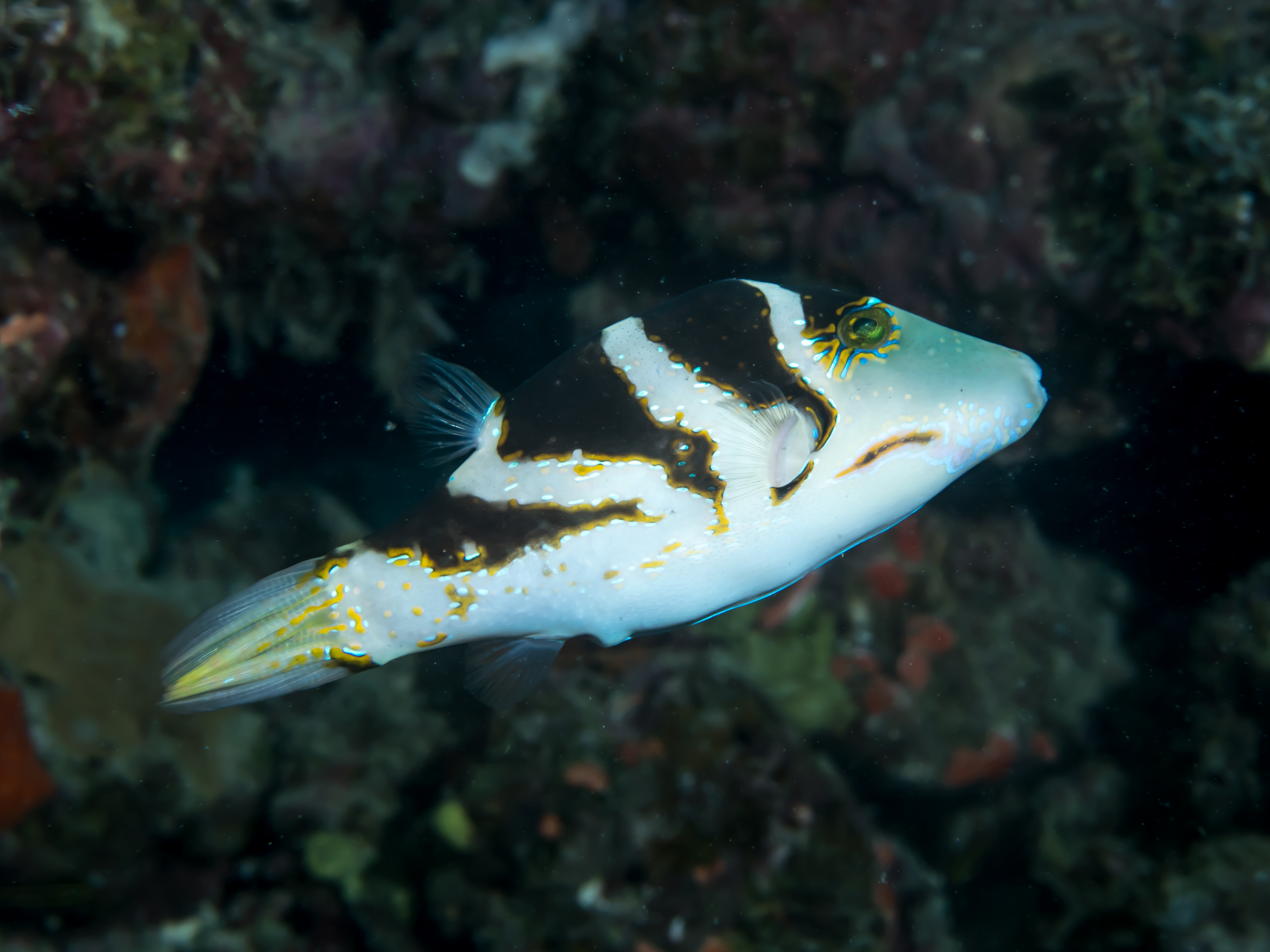

Conservation status
- Least Concern (IUCN 3.1)

Scientific classification
- Kingdom: Animalia
- Phylum: Chordata
- Class: Actinopterygii
- Division: Teleostei
- Order: Tetraodontiformes
- Family: Tetraodontidae
- Genus: Canthigaster
- Species: C. axiologus

Binomial name
- Canthigaster axiologus (Whitley, 1931)

= Canthigaster axiologus =

Species of fish

Canthigaster axiologus is a species of marine fish in the family Tetraodontidae. Also known as the Pacific crown toby, it is present throughout the tropical waters of the Western Pacific area, while other similar-looking species replace it in the Hawaiian Islands and the Indian Ocean.

In Indonesia

Canthigaster axiologus is a small sized fish that can reach a maximum size of 10.1 cm length.
