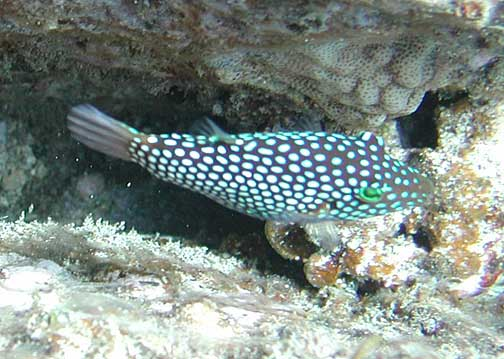

Conservation status
- Least Concern (IUCN 3.1)

Scientific classification
- Domain: Eukaryota
- Kingdom: Animalia
- Phylum: Chordata
- Class: Actinopterygii
- Order: Tetraodontiformes
- Family: Tetraodontidae
- Genus: Canthigaster
- Species: C. jactator

Binomial name
- Canthigaster jactator (O. P. Jenkins, 1901)

= Canthigaster jactator =

Species of fish

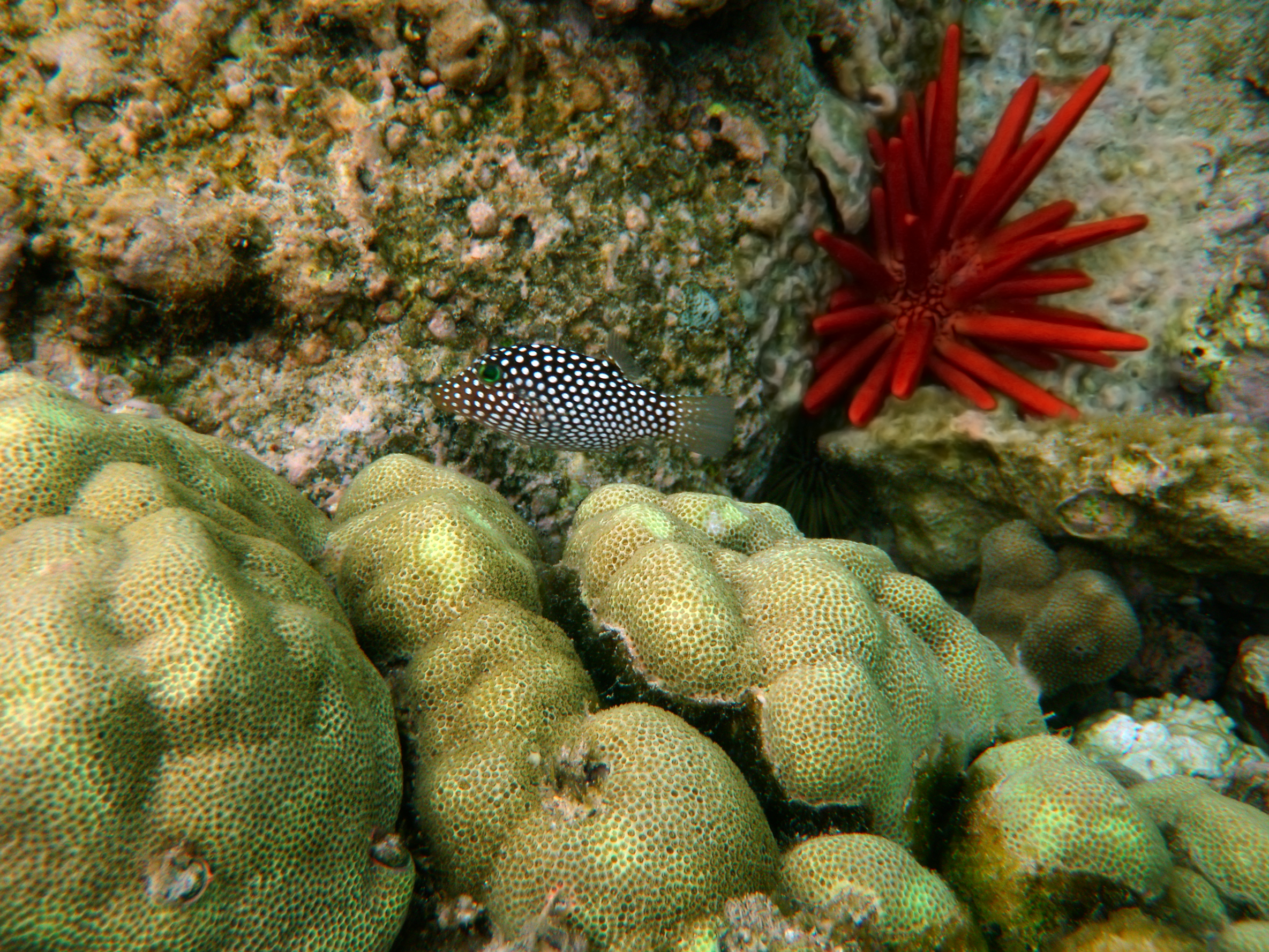
Hawaiian whitespotted puffer in Kona

Canthigaster jactator, the Hawaiian whitespotted toby, is a member of the pufferfish family that is endemic to the Hawaiian Islands. It occasionally makes its way into the aquarium trade. It grows to a length of 9 cm (3.5 in).

== Description ==
This fish has a compact, elongated body characterized by a pattern of white spots on a darker background. The white spots serve as a form of camouflage, helping it blend in with coral and rocky environments. Its head is relatively large compared to its body, and it has a small mouth with teeth that are fused into a beak-like structure. This unique anatomy is typical of pufferfish, allowing it to consume hard-shelled prey. Like other members of the pufferfish family, this species is capable of producing tetrodotoxin, a potent neurotoxin that serves as a defense mechanism against predators. The toxin is concentrated in certain tissues and renders the fish highly toxic if ingested.

== Distribution and habitat ==
The Hawaiian whitespotted toby is endemic to the Hawaiian Islands. Its primary habitat includes the warm, shallow waters surrounding the Hawaiian archipelago, and inhabits coral reefs and rocky areas, where it can find ample shelter. It is commonly found on lagoon and seaward reefs in Hawaii, where it thrives among coral structures and feeds on small invertebrates and algae. This fish prefer environments with plenty of crevices and ledges, which provide protection from predators. The species is well-adapted to the reef ecosystem, playing a role in maintaining the health of coral habitats. Its distribution is largely confined to the Hawaiian archipelago, making it an important part of the local marine biodiversity.

== Human use ==
The Hawaiian whitespotted toby is also known in the aquarium trade, where its striking coloration and compact size make it a popular choice for hobbyists. However, care should be taken when handling or keeping these fish, as they are known to release toxins when stressed, similar to other pufferfish species.
