= Keiichi Matsuura =

Japanese ichthyologist

- 松浦 啓一
- Born: August 1948 (age 77–78); Tokyo, Japan
- Education: Tokyo University of Fisheries; Hokkaido University
- Known for: Systematics and phylogeny of Tetraodontiformes
- Awards: Minakata Kumagusu Award (2025)
- Scientific career
- Fields: Ichthyology
- Workplaces: National Museum of Nature and Science; University of Tokyo

Keiichi Matsuura (Japanese: 松浦 啓一, born August 1948) is a Japanese ichthyologist and Honorary Researcher at the National Museum of Nature and Science. He served as the 18th and 20th president of the Ichthyological Society of Japan.

== Biography ==
Matsuura was born in Tokyo. He graduated from the Department of Aquaculture, Tokyo University of Fisheries in 1971. He completed his master's degree at the Graduate School of Fisheries Science, Hokkaido University in 1973, and obtained his doctorate there in 1978. His doctoral dissertation was titled “Phylogenetic studies of the superfamily Balistoidea, with the taxonomy of the species found around Japan and its adjacent waters”.

In 1979, he joined the National Museum of Nature and Science as a research scientist. He later served as senior researcher, section head, and department director. From 1995 he was an associate professor at the Graduate School of Science, University of Tokyo, becoming a full professor in 2003. He retired in 2013 and became director of the Shōwa Memorial Institute, Tsukuba Botanical Collections.

His research focuses on the systematics, phylogeny, and distribution of teleost fishes. He has conducted detailed studies on the phylogenetic relationships of the Balistoidea, which include the families Balistidae (triggerfishes) and Monacanthidae (filefishes).

During his presidency of the Ichthyological Society of Japan, he submitted a petition to Environment Minister Shunichi Suzuki requesting suspension of Unimat Real Estate’s resort development project at the mouth of the Urauchi River on Iriomote Island and the implementation of an environmental impact assessment. He served as a research committee member of the Science Council of Japan from 1997 to 2000 and as an associate member from 2014 to 2020.

In 2025, Matsuura received the 35th Minakata Kumagusu Award (Natural Sciences category).

== Publications ==
=== Books ===
- Animal Taxonomy. University of Tokyo Press, 2009.
- Shitatakana Sakana-tachi (Hardy Fishes). Kadokawa Shinsho, 2017.
- Illustrated Guide to Japanese Pufferfishes. Tokai University Press, 2017.
- Round Fishes Illustrated. X-Knowledge, 2020.
- Brave Fishes: The Toughness of Japanese Fish. X-Knowledge, 2020.

=== Co-authored and Edited Works ===
- Natural History of Fishes: Evolution in the Water (co-editor with Tadashi Miya). Hokkaido University Press, 1999.
- Names of Insects, Shells, and Fishes: Stories Behind Japanese Names (co-editor with Junichi Aoki and Takashi Okutani). Tokai University Press, 2002.
- Shogakukan Illustrated Book of Fish (co-supervisor with Hitoshi Ida and Masahiro Aizawa). Shogakukan, 2003.
- Considering the Shapes of Fishes. Tokai University Press, 2005.
- Illustrated Fish Mysteries. Natsume-sha, 2006.
- The World of Specimens. Tokai University Press, 2010.
- Fishes of the Kuroshio Current. Tokai University Press, 2012.
- Evergreen Forests in the Metropolis: Biodiversity and Environment of the Institute for Nature Study. (co-editor with Shoji Hamao). Tokai University Press, 2013.
- Specimen Science: Collection and Management of Natural History Specimens. Tokai University Press, 2014.
- The Natural History of Toxic Fishes. (co-editor with Yuji Nagashima). Hokkaido University Press, 2015.
- Beautiful Fishes of the World. PIE International, 2013.
- Sushi Conveyor Belt Fishes Illustrated. Shufu no Tomo Publishing, 2018.

=== Translations ===
- Andrew Campbell & John Dawes (eds.), Encyclopedia of Marine Animals: Fishes. Asakura Publishing, 2000.
- The Hidden World of Animals 12: Catfishes. Asakura Publishing, 2013.
