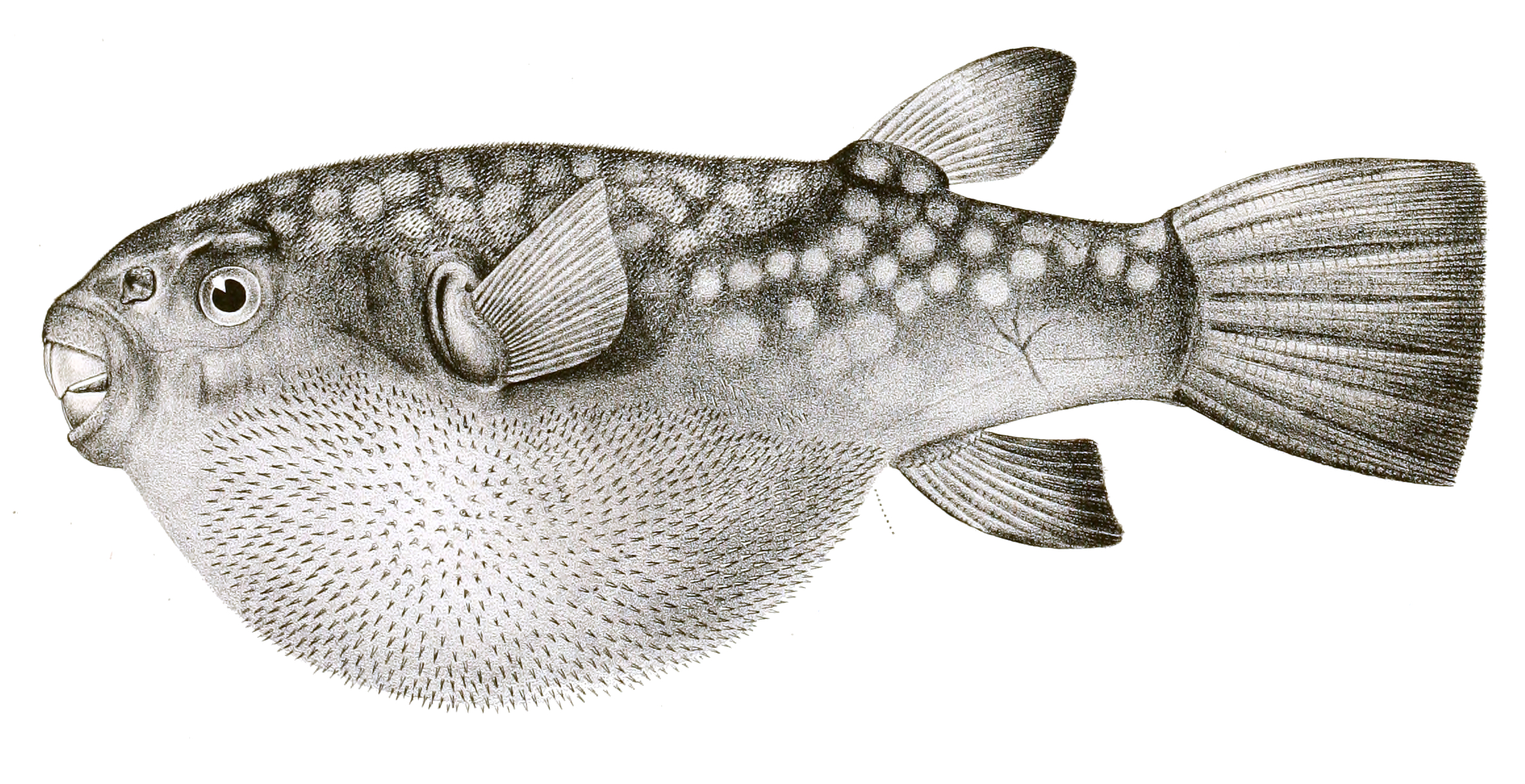

Scientific classification
- Kingdom: Animalia
- Phylum: Chordata
- Class: Actinopterygii
- Order: Tetraodontiformes
- Family: Tetraodontidae
- Genus: Chelonodon; J. P. Müller, 1841

Type species
- Tetrodon kappa Hamilton, 1822

Species
- see text

Synonyms
- Chelonodontops

= Chelonodon =

Genus of fishes

Chelonodon (from Ancient Greek χελώνη (khelṓnē), meaning "turtle", and ὀδούς (odoús), meaning "tooth") is a genus of pufferfishes native to the Indo-Pacific. They are mainly found in coastal regions and estuaries, but sometimes in rivers.

== Species and taxonomy ==
There are six recognized species in this genus:

- Chelonodon alvheimi (Psomadakis, Matsuura & Thein, 2018)
- Chelonodon kappa (Hamilton, 1822)
- Chelonodon laticeps (J. L. B. Smith, 1948) (Blue-spotted blaasop)
- Chelonodon leopardus (Day, 1878) (Banded leopard blowfish)
- Chelonodon patoca (F. Hamilton, 1822) (Milk-spotted puffer)
- Chelonodon pleurospilus (Regan, 1919) (Blaasop beauty)

Synonyms

- Chelonodon bengalensis (Habib et al., 2018) (Bengal reticulated puffer) is a synonym of Chelonodon patoca (Hamilton, 1822)

The type species of Chelonodon was Leiodon cutcutia, making it a synonym of Leiodon. As a consequence, Catalog of Fishes and other authorities instead placed the above species in Chelonodontops. FishBase, however, still uses Chelonodon, and therefore the type was changed to C. kappa in 2024.
