= Proline-Rich Coiled Coil 1 =

Protein

Identifiers
- Aliases
- External IDs: GeneCards: ; OMA:- orthologs
Orthologs
Species	Human	Mouse
Entrez	n/a	n/a
Ensembl	n/a	n/a
UniProt	n a	n/a
RefSeq (mRNA)	n/a	n/a
RefSeq (protein)	n/a	n/a
Location (UCSC)	n/a	n/a
PubMed search	n/a	n/a
- Wikidata
View/Edit Human

Proline Rich Coiled Coil-1 (PRCC1) is the commonly identified protein name of CAD38605. The PRCC1 gene is found on the long arm of Chromosome 5. It encodes for 445 amino acids for a predicted total of 6 exons. The predicted molecular weight is 46.7 kDa, and the isoelectric point is 5.46. Orthologs have been determined in most eukaryotes, the most highly conserved being found in most mammalian species. Moderate conservation is maintained among other distant species such as: Gallus gallus, Xenopus, Strongylocentrotus purpuratus, Tetraodon, etc.

The PRCC1 gene has two distinct regions: a proline-rich region on the N-terminus, and the DUF84 region on the C-terminus.

The DUF84 region is found in the genome of a bacterium called Vibrio cholerae. The region consists of approximately 183 amino acid residues. V. cholerae causes cholera and stomach flu in humans. The DUF84 region alone is about 160 amino acid residues. It is the only other protein that consists of DUF84 other than PRCC1.

The subcellular localization prediction program pTarget, predicted PRCC1 to be localized in the nucleus with a confidence of 95%. However, a research paper by Kamakari et al. determined the protein to localize in the Golgi Apparatus. PRCC1 is ubiquitously expressed, with high-density expression in the brain, hypothalamus and hippocampus in particular. No evidence of protein-protein interactions were found. No evidence of RNA alternate splicing was determined.
