= Tetrodon =

Tetrodon may refer to:

- a synonym of Dendrobium, a genus of orchid
- Tetraodon, a genus of puffer fish
