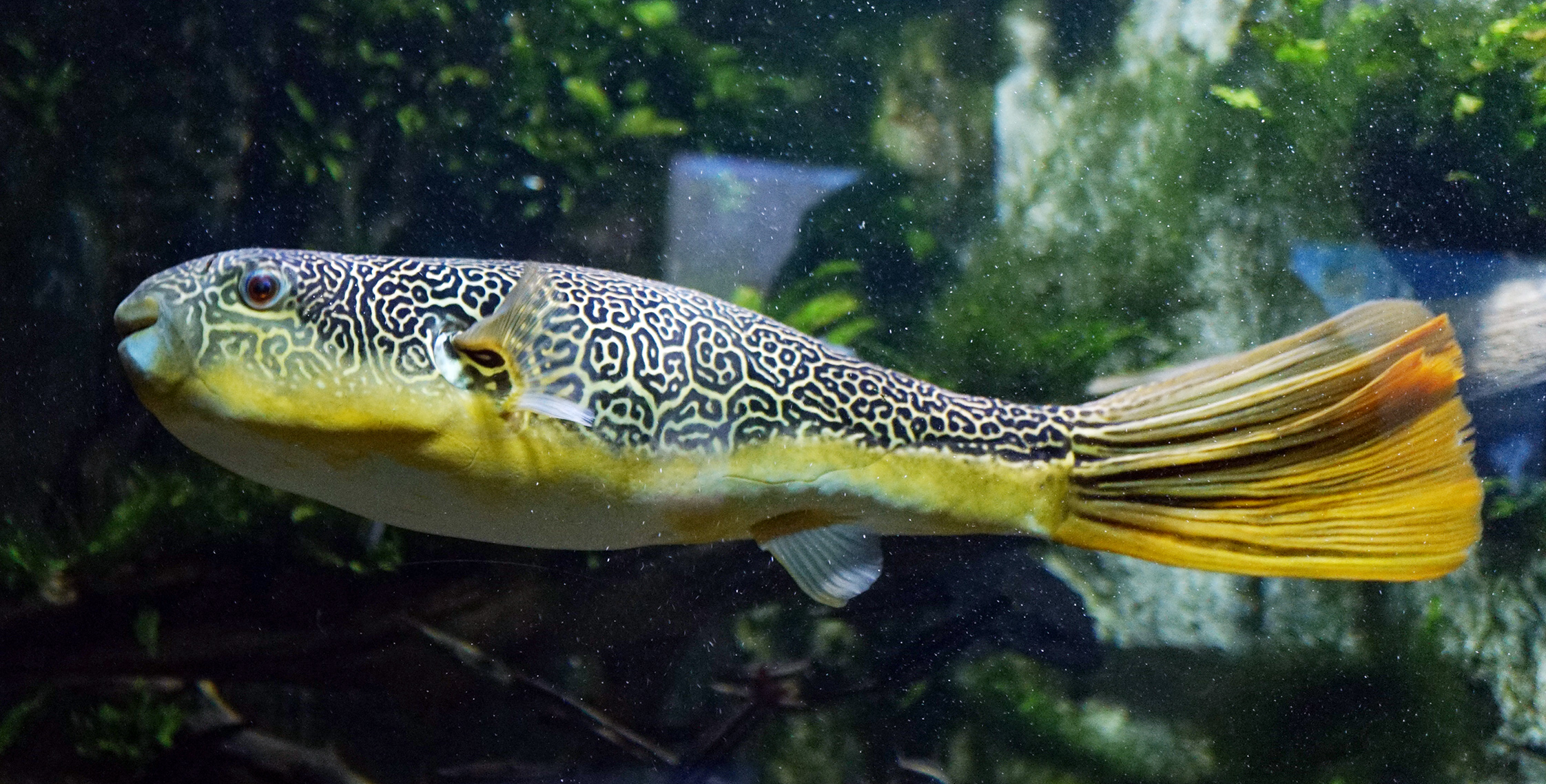
- At the Särkänniemi Aquarium

Conservation status
- Least Concern (IUCN 3.1)

Scientific classification
- Kingdom: Animalia
- Phylum: Chordata
- Class: Actinopterygii
- Order: Tetraodontiformes
- Family: Tetraodontidae
- Genus: Tetraodon
- Species: T. mbu

Binomial name
- Tetraodon mbu Boulenger, 1899
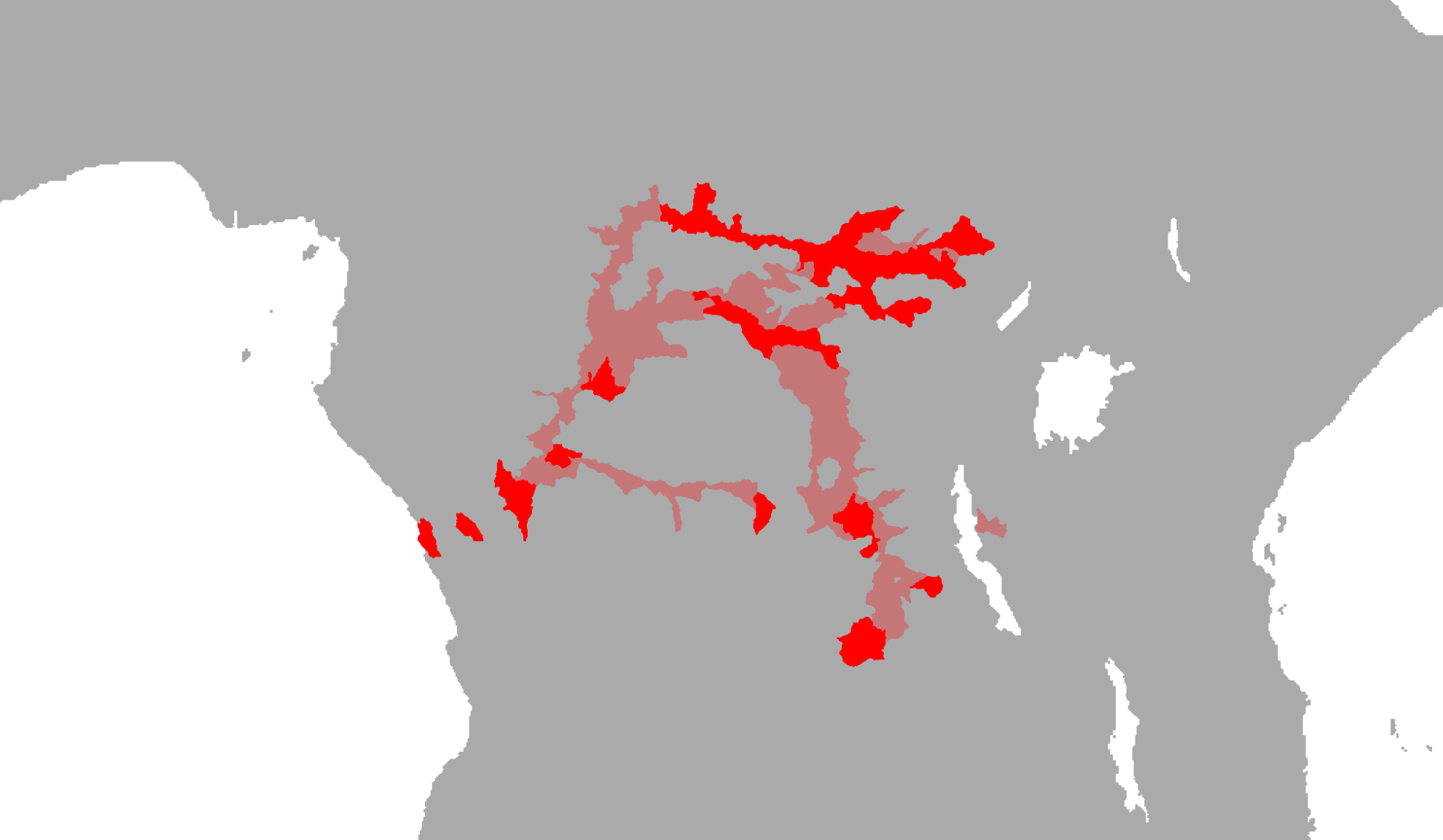

= Mbu pufferfish =

Species of fish

The Mbu pufferfish, also known as Mbuna pufferfish, giant pufferfish, or giant freshwater pufferfish (Tetraodon mbu), is a carnivorous freshwater pufferfish originating from the middle and lower sections of the Congo River in Africa, as well as the east coast of Lake Tanganyika near the Malagarasi River mouth.

== Description ==
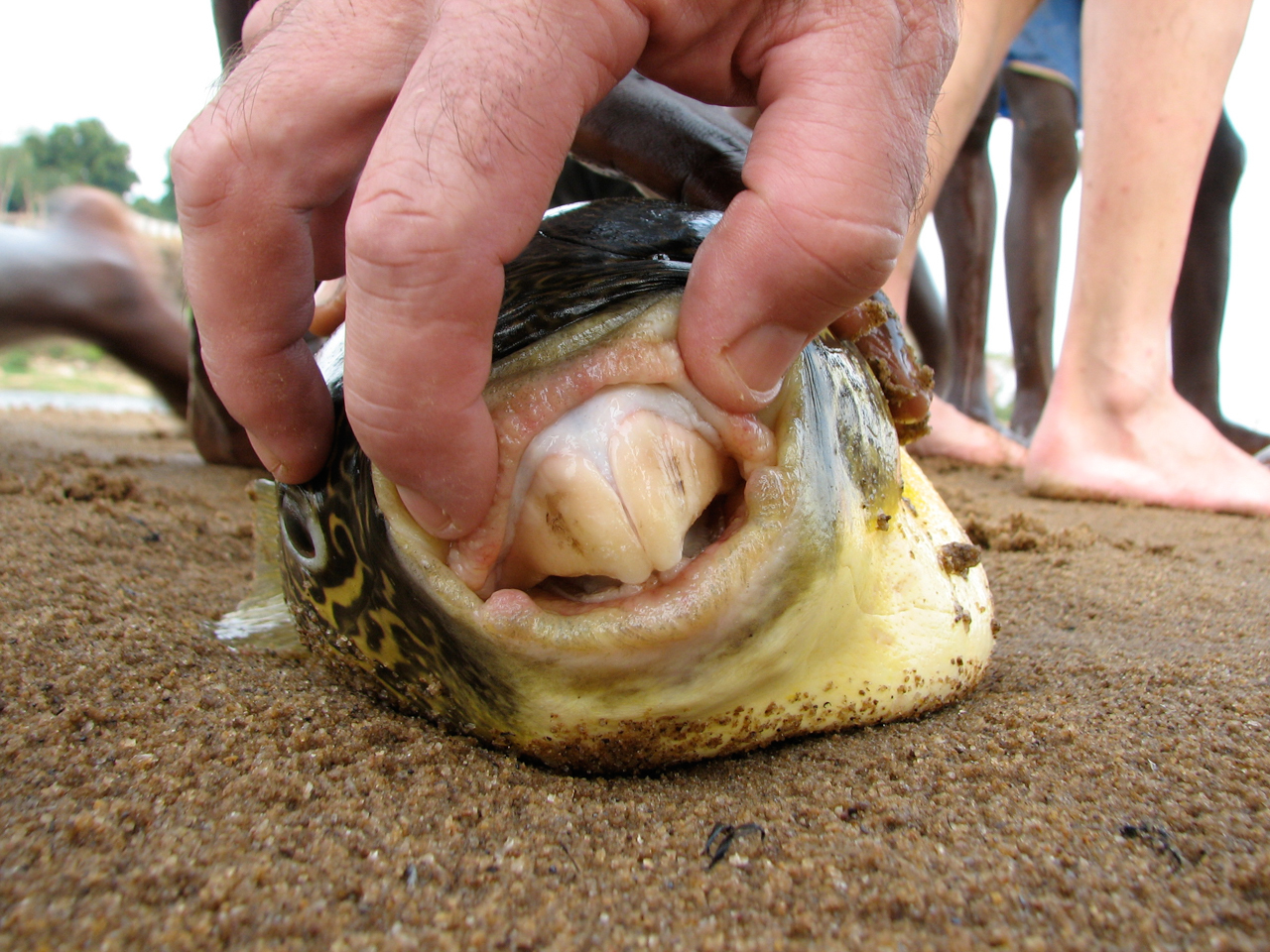
Mbu pufferfish teeth

The species is commonly referred to as the giant freshwater pufferfish due to its massive size, growing to a length of 67 cm (26 inches). As such, these fish are difficult to adequately house in home aquaria since they require a very large tank and appropriately scaled water filtration.

Mbu puffers are distinct from other members of the Tetraodon genus due to their labyrinthine patterns of skin pigmentation, in contrast to mottled or straight-striped patterns such as those seen in Fahaka pufferfish. These patterns become more pronounced as adults.

Like all of its relatives, the Mbu puffer is capable of inflating itself with water or air when stressed or otherwise frightened.

== Diet ==
It feeds on smaller fish, mollusks, crustaceans, snails, worms, and crayfish. Species kept in captivity require a varied diet consisting of shelled foods to help ensure good health and to prevent tooth overgrowth.

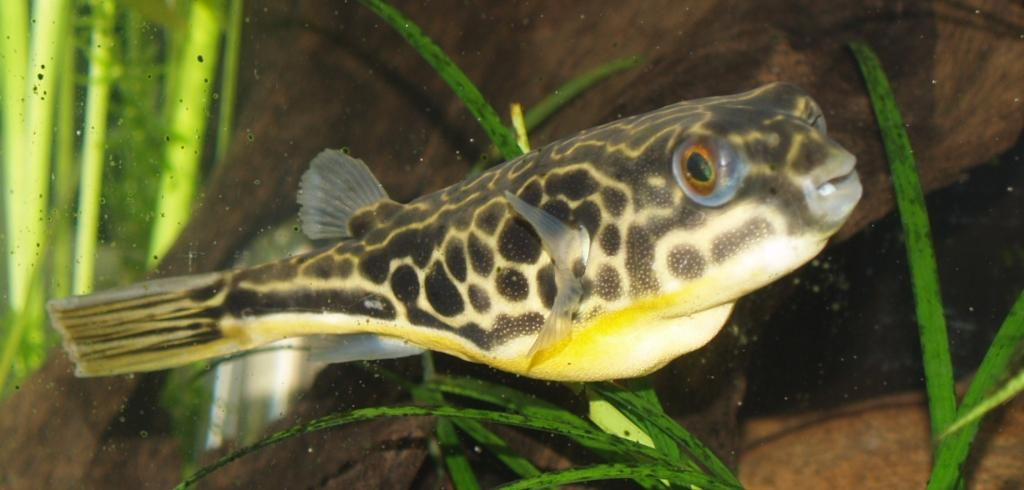
Juvenile mbu puffer

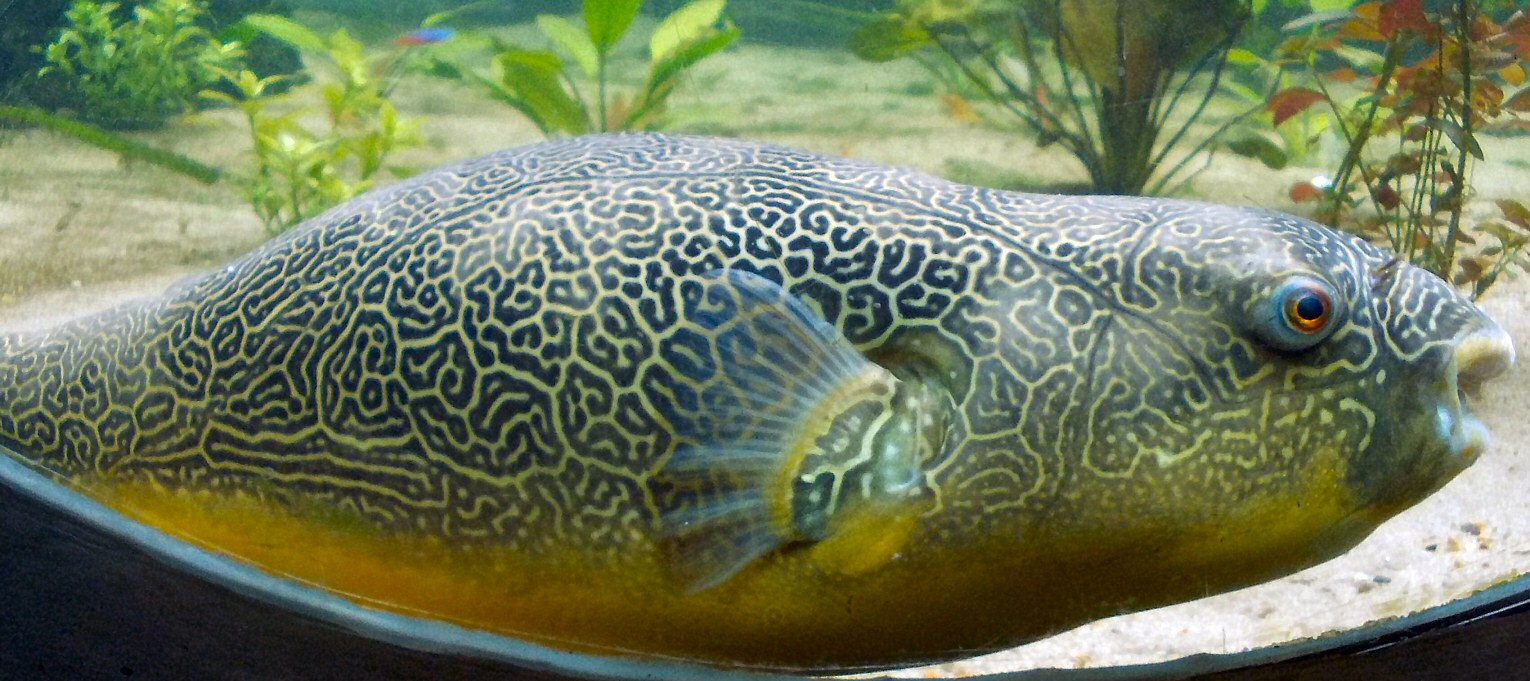
Adult mbu puffer showing its elaborate skin patterns

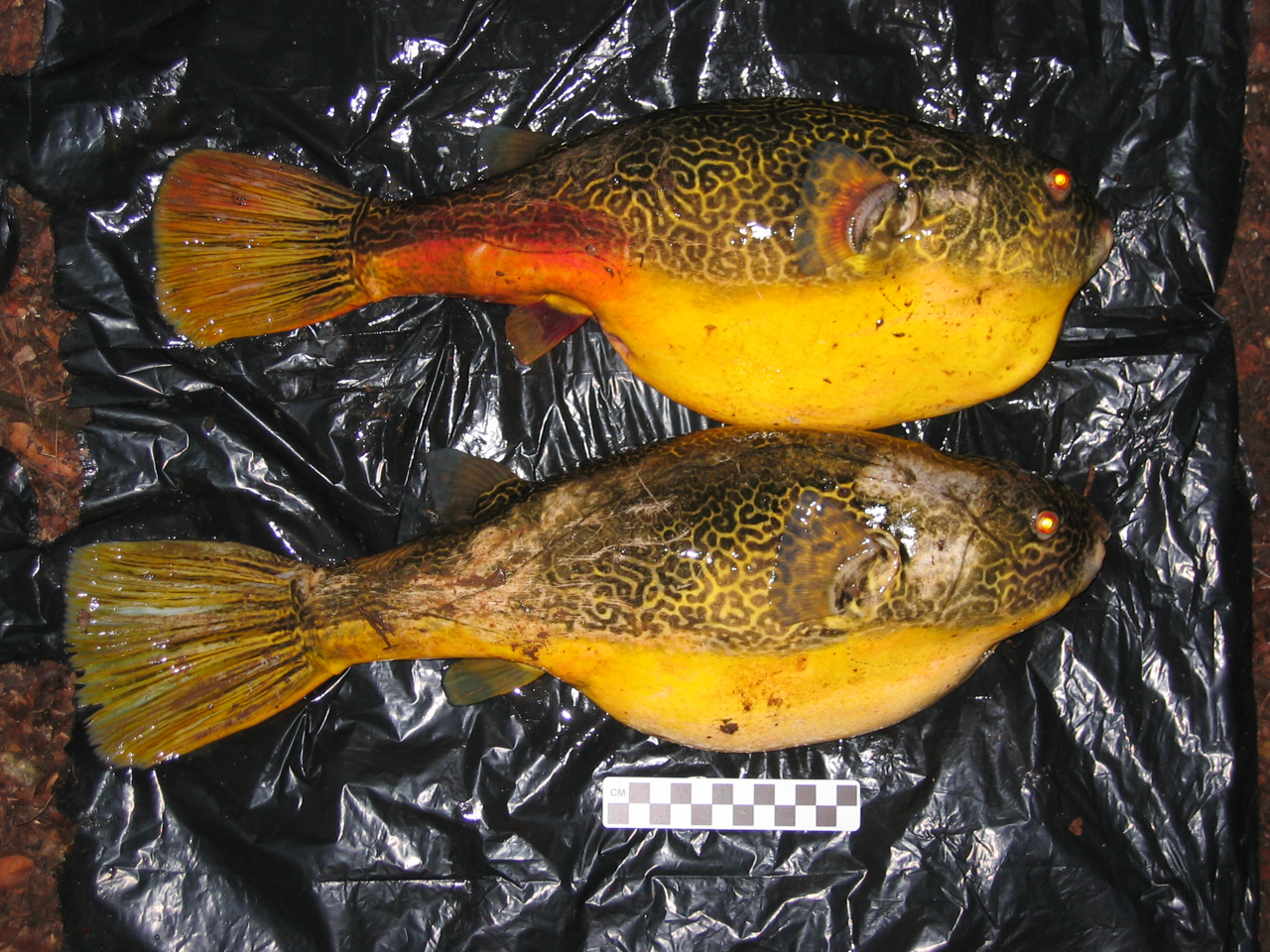
In Tanzania
