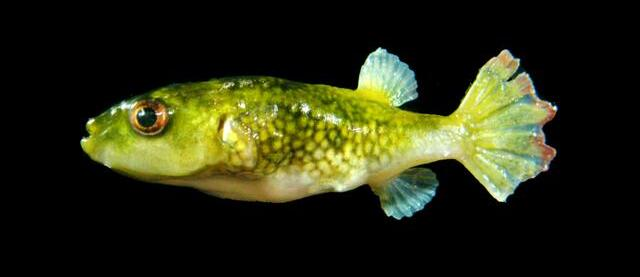

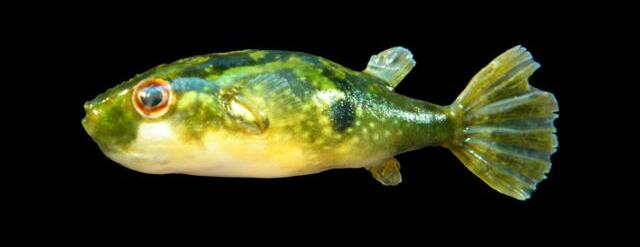

Conservation status
- Least Concern (IUCN 3.1)

Scientific classification
- Kingdom: Animalia
- Phylum: Chordata
- Class: Actinopterygii
- Order: Tetraodontiformes
- Family: Tetraodontidae
- Genus: Leiodon; Swainson, 1839
- Species: L. cutcutia

Binomial name
- Leiodon cutcutia (F. Hamilton, 1822)

Synonyms
- Tetraodon cutcutia F. Hamilton, 1822; Leisomus cutcutia (F. Hamilton, 1822); Monotretus cutcutia (F. Hamilton, 1822); Tetrodon caria F. Hamilton, 1822; Tetrodon gularis F. Hamilton, 1822; Monotreta gularis (F. Hamilton, 1822); Leisomus marmoratus Swainson, 1839

= Leiodon cutcutia =

Species of fish

Leiodon cutcutia, the ocellated pufferfish, is a species of pufferfish native to southern Asia from India to the Malay Archipelago where it is found in various bodies of fresh and brackish waters. This species grows to a length of 15 centimetres (5.9 in) TL. It was included in Tetraodon until 2013.

== Taxonomy ==
The species was first described in 1822 by Francis Buchanan-Hamilton as Tetraodon cutcutia from specimens collected in the Ganges River, India. For much of its history it was retained in the genus Tetraodon, alongside a wide range of freshwater and marine pufferfishes.

In 2013, Maurice Kottelat’s comprehensive review of Southeast Asian freshwater fishes revalidated the genus Leiodon, transferring cutcutia to this genus as its only recognized species.

Molecular phylogenetic studies have since supported its distinct placement, with Leiodon considered a valid and separate lineage within the family Tetraodontidae.

== In captivity ==
Leiodon cutcutia appears occasionally in the aquarium trade. A detailed care guide by Macauley Sykes, published through Pufferfish Enthusiasts Worldwide (PEW), notes that the species is best maintained in a densely planted aquarium with plentiful hiding spaces and moderate water flow. Reported water preferences for the species in captivity include a temperature of 24–28 °C and a pH of around 6.5–7.5.

The same guide describes the species as carnivorous, feeding readily on snails, small crustaceans, and other invertebrates. It cautions that individuals may display aggression toward tankmates and are therefore often kept either singly or in species-only aquaria. Frequent water changes and strong biological filtration are recommended, as the species is sensitive to deteriorating water quality.
