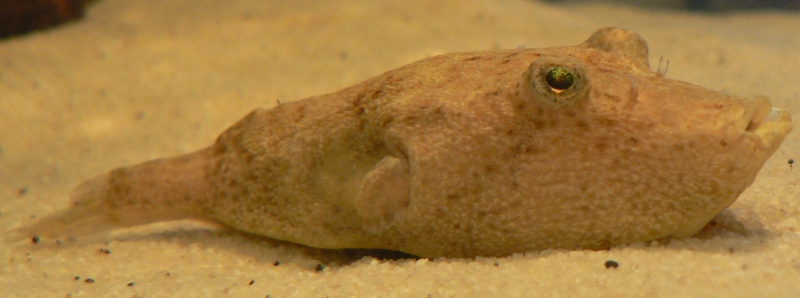

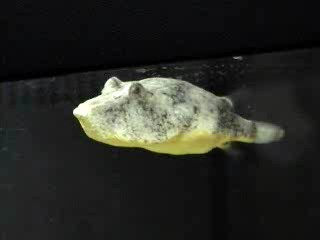

Conservation status
- Least Concern (IUCN 3.1)

Scientific classification
- Kingdom: Animalia
- Phylum: Chordata
- Class: Actinopterygii
- Division: Teleostei
- Order: Tetraodontiformes
- Family: Tetraodontidae
- Genus: Tetraodon
- Species: T. miurus

Binomial name
- Tetraodon miurus Boulenger, 1902
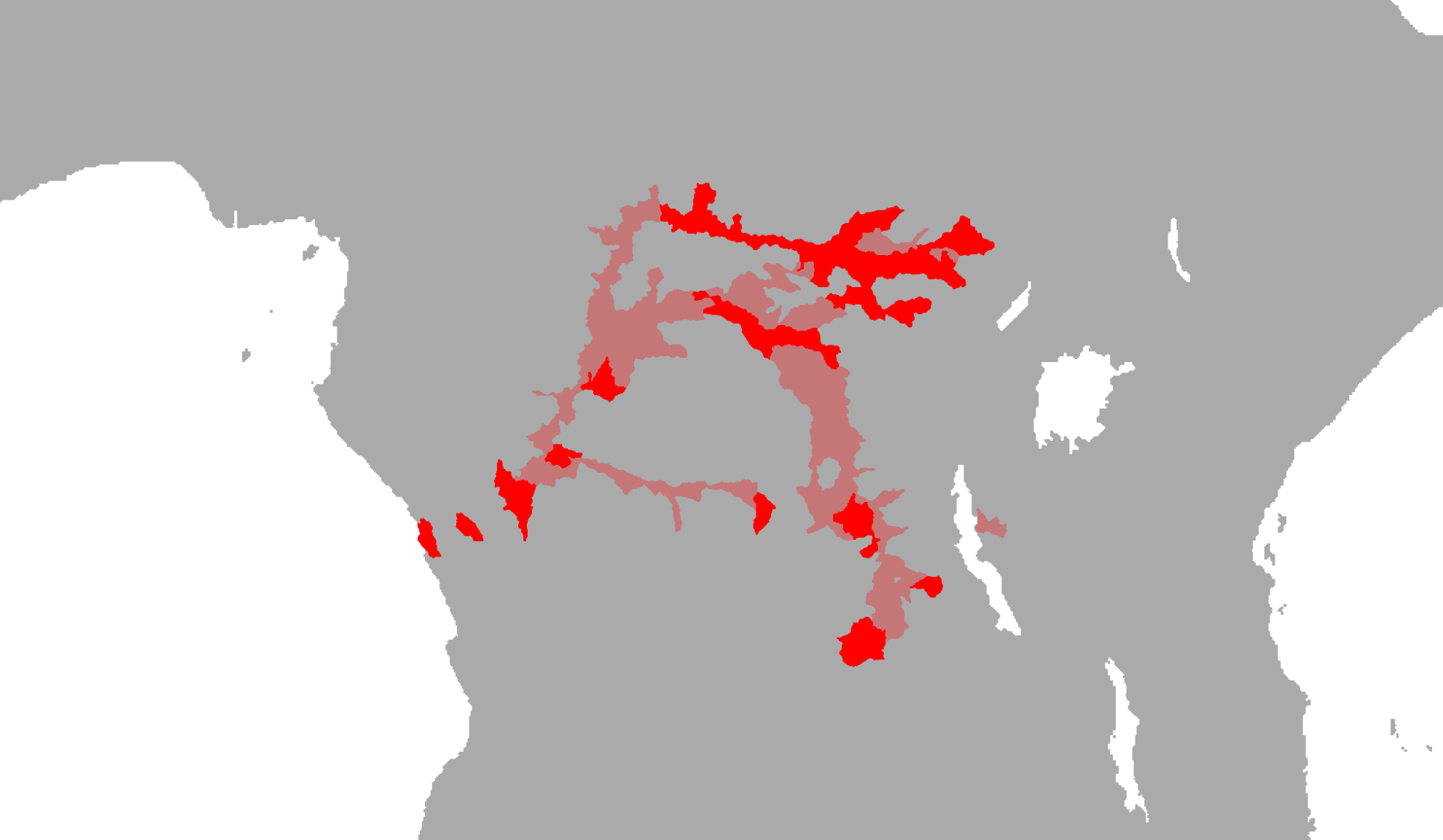

Synonyms
- Tetrodon miurus (Boulenger, 1902)

= Congo pufferfish =

Species of fish

The Congo puffer or potato puffer (Tetraodon miurus) is a freshwater pufferfish found in areas of the Congo River in Africa, including rapids.

== Description ==
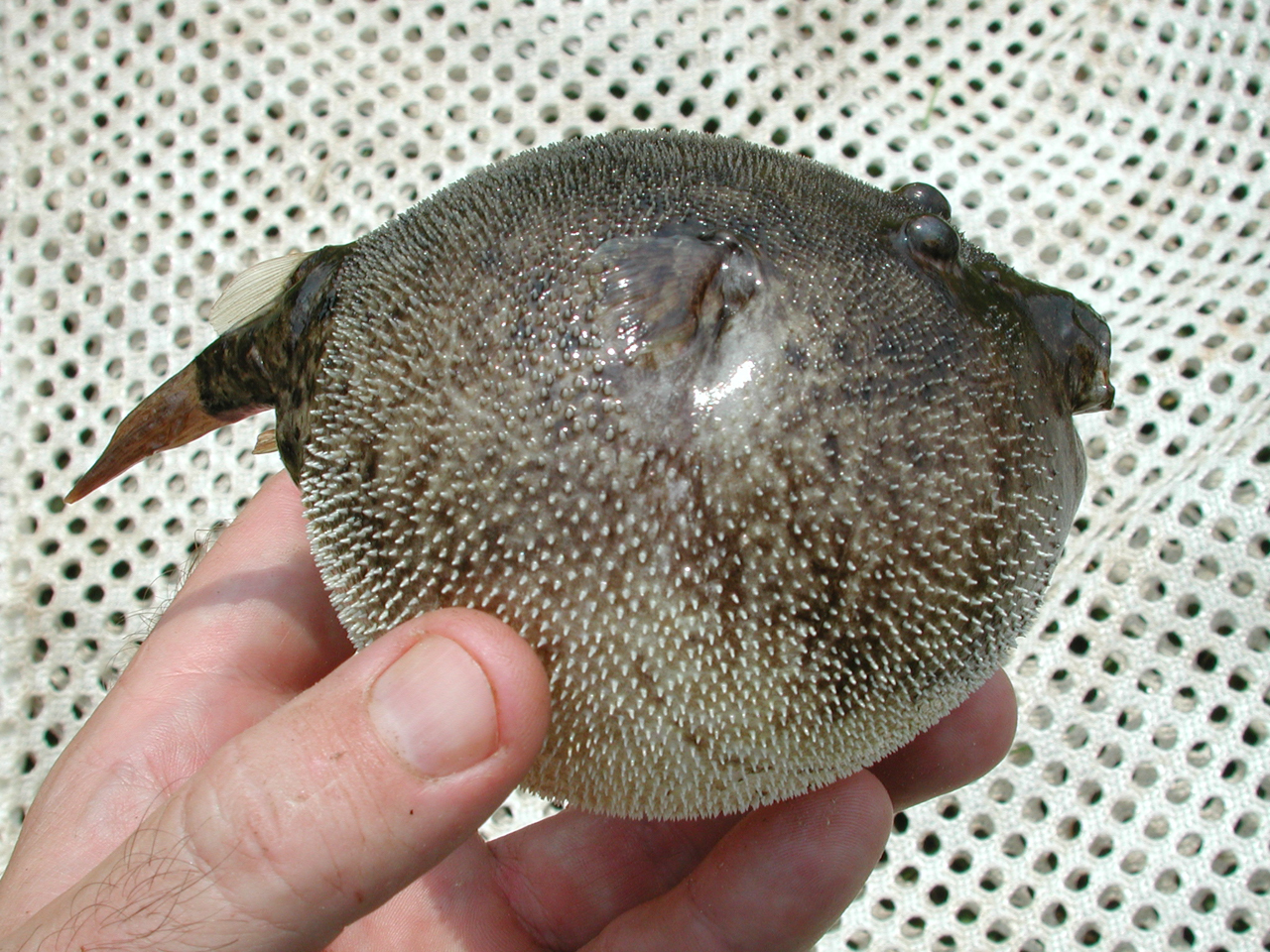
Inflated

Congo puffers can grow to an approximate length of 15 cm.

Like all members of the genus Tetraodon, the Congo puffer is capable of inflating itself with water or air when stressed or otherwise frightened. It also has a deadly toxin like most species.

They are inactive fishes, spending most of their time buried in sand or other substrate, with the ability to adapt their colouration to hide from potential prey. However, many colour variations are seen within the species, ranging from black to sandy to bright red. If in a dark substrate, it will generally become darker in color.

== In captivity ==
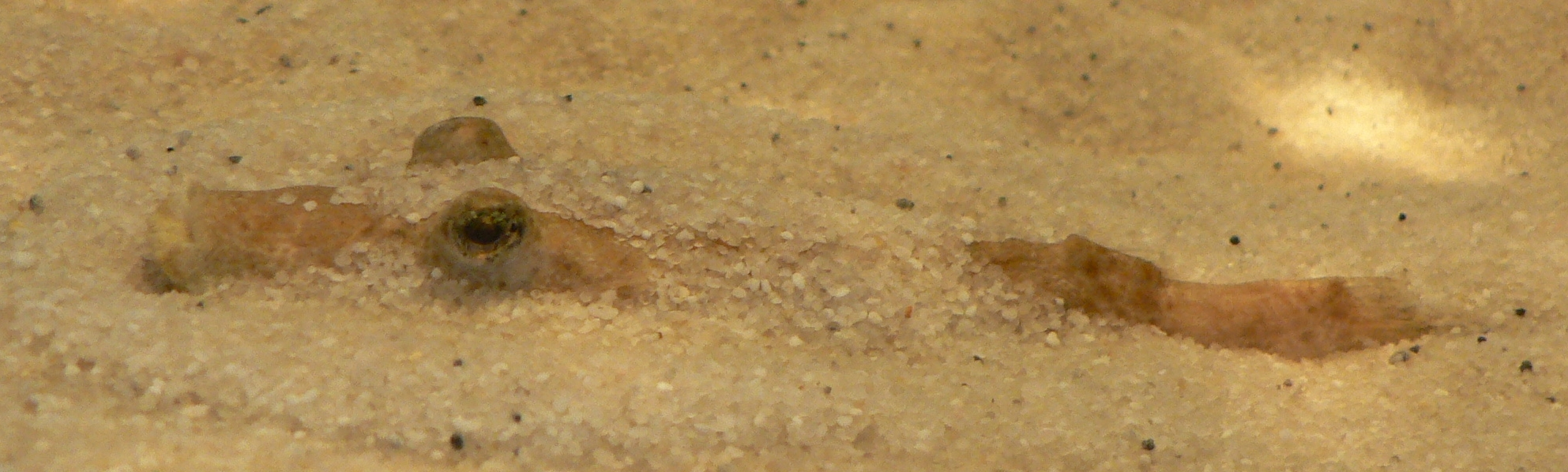
T. miurus wallowing in the substrate

Congo puffers require a tank with at least 60cm in length, 40cm depth and 30cm tall.

It is important that the Congo puffer is provided with a very soft, sand substrate - at least 5cm deep - so the fish is able to exhibit its natural wallowing behaviour.

== Diet ==
Congo puffer is primarily a piscivore, feeding mostly on smaller fish and maybe small amphibians. In captivity it is recommended to feed them a diet of 30% frozen thawed, thiaminase free freshwater fish and 70% earthworms, cockroaches and small terrestrial isopods

== Conservation ==
The Congo puffer populations in the wild are still healthy in suitable habitats and it is considered 'Least Concern' by the IUCN

== Gallery ==
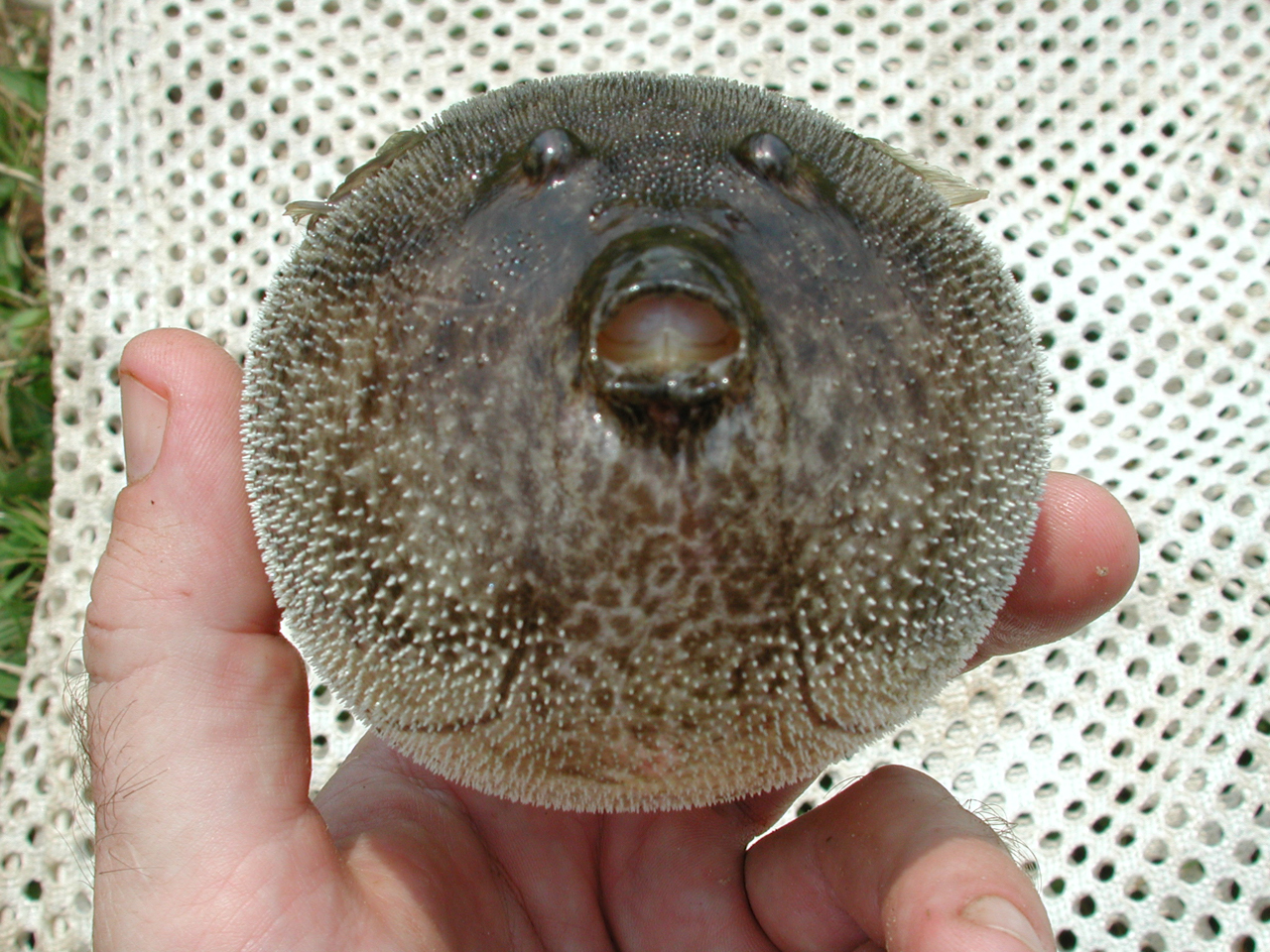
Inflated

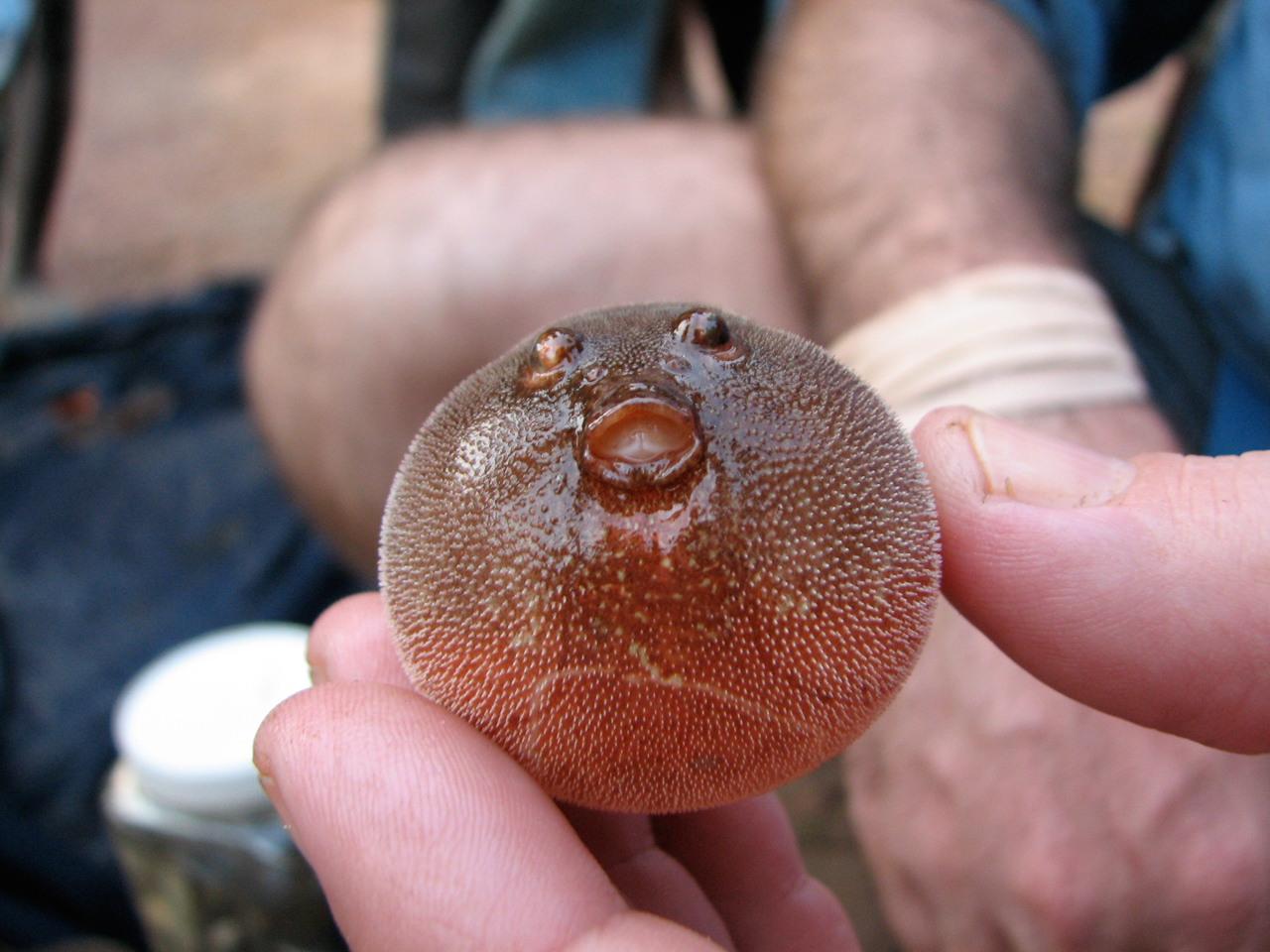
Inflated

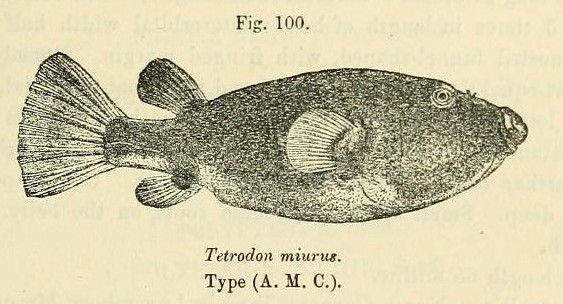
1916 illustration
