= Tetraodon duboisi =

Conservation status
- Data Deficient (IUCN 3.1)

Scientific classification
- Kingdom: Animalia
- Phylum: Chordata
- Class: Actinopterygii
- Order: Tetraodontiformes
- Family: Tetraodontidae
- Genus: Tetraodon
- Species: T. duboisi

Binomial name
- Tetraodon duboisi Poll, 1959
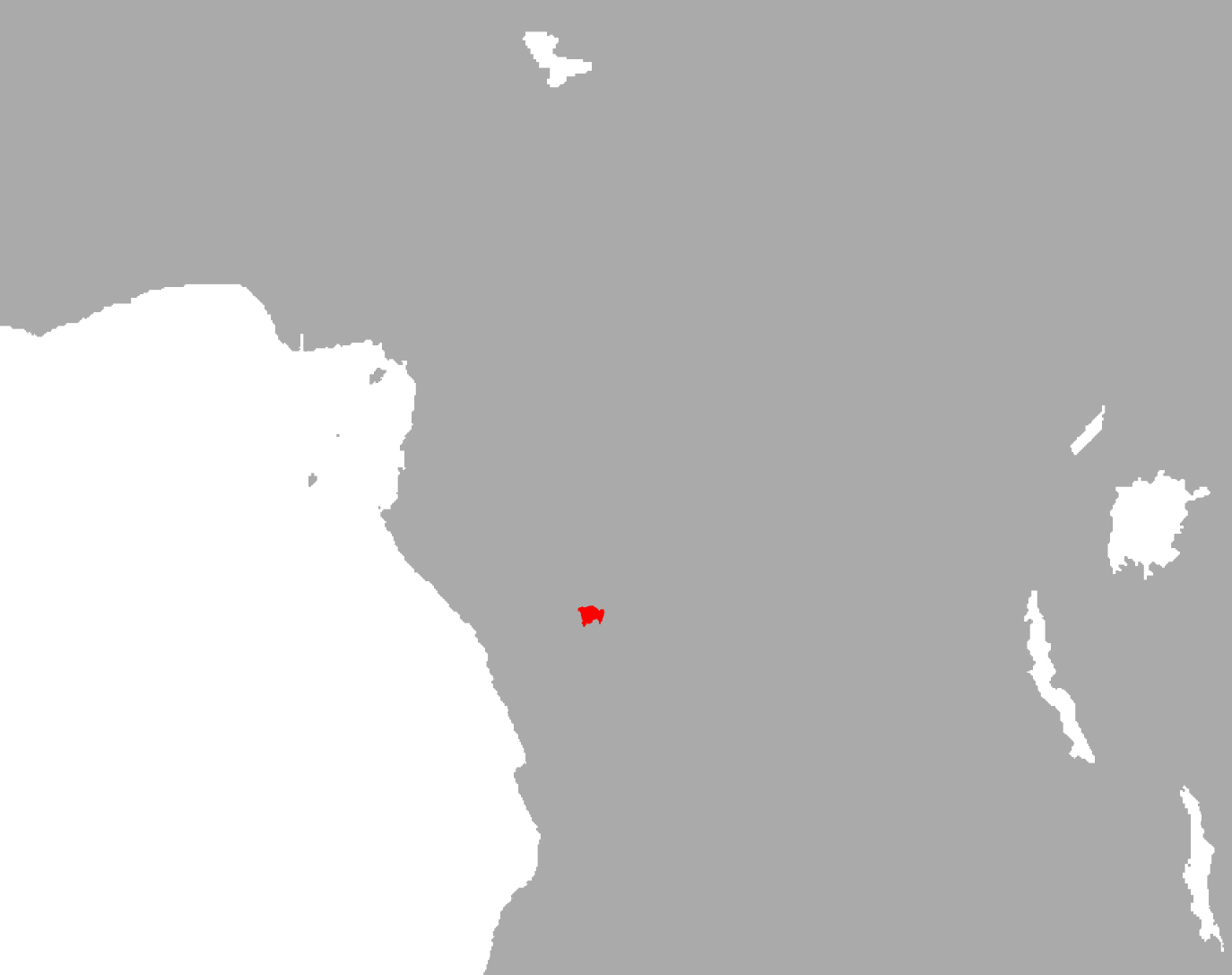

Species of fish

Tetraodon duboisi is a species of pufferfish endemic to the Democratic Republic of the Congo where it is known only from Stanley Pool. Some sources speculate that they are critically endangered in the wild, but that theory is difficult to verify as violence in the Democratic Republic of the Congo makes it extremely difficult to capture them for the aquarium trade and scientific research. However, there are a few Tetraodon duboisi specimens owned by private aquarists in the United States.
