= Leiodon dapsilis =

Conservation status
- Data Deficient (IUCN 3.1)

Scientific classification
- Kingdom: Animalia
- Phylum: Chordata
- Class: Actinopterygii
- Order: Tetraodontiformes
- Family: Tetraodontidae
- Genus: Leiodon
- Species: L. dapsilis

Binomial name
- Leiodon dapsilis (Whitley, 1943)

Synonyms
- Chelonodon dapsilis

Species of fish

Leiodon dapsilis, known as the plentiful toby, is a species of pufferfish in the family Tetraodontidae. It is native to the Western Pacific, where it is endemic to Australia. It is a tropical fish found in both marine and brackish environments, being known from coastal estuaries, mangrove swamps, and sandy areas in marine waters. The species is reported to be oviparous. ITIS lists this species as a member of the genus Chelonodon, although WoRMS and FishBase both include it within Leiodon. It was first described by Gilbert Whitley in 1943, from a specimen collected from the Fitzroy River, in Queensland.
