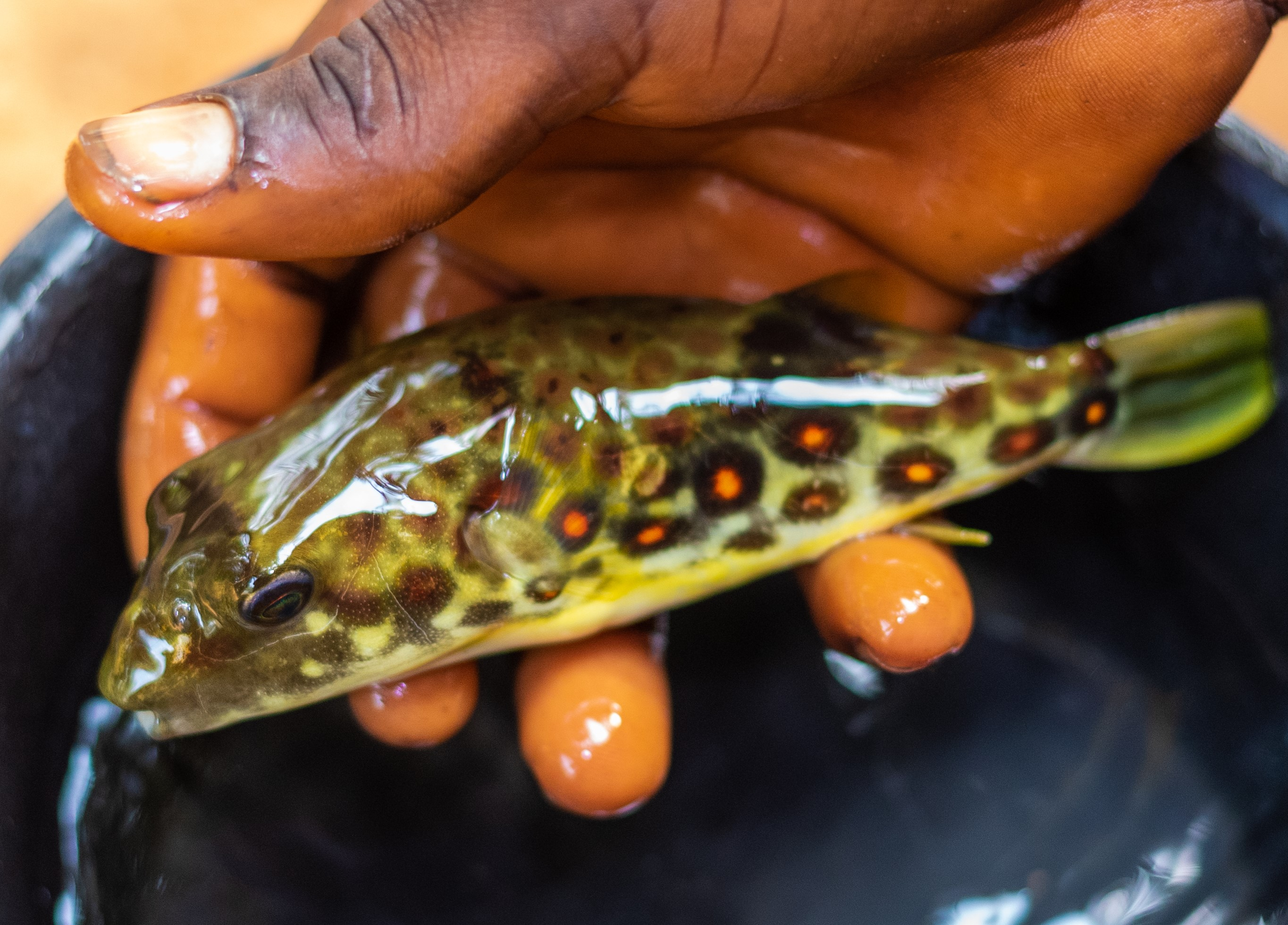

Conservation status
- Endangered (IUCN 3.1)

Scientific classification
- Kingdom: Animalia
- Phylum: Chordata
- Class: Actinopterygii
- Order: Tetraodontiformes
- Family: Tetraodontidae
- Genus: Tetraodon
- Species: T. pustulatus

Binomial name
- Tetraodon pustulatus Murray, 1857
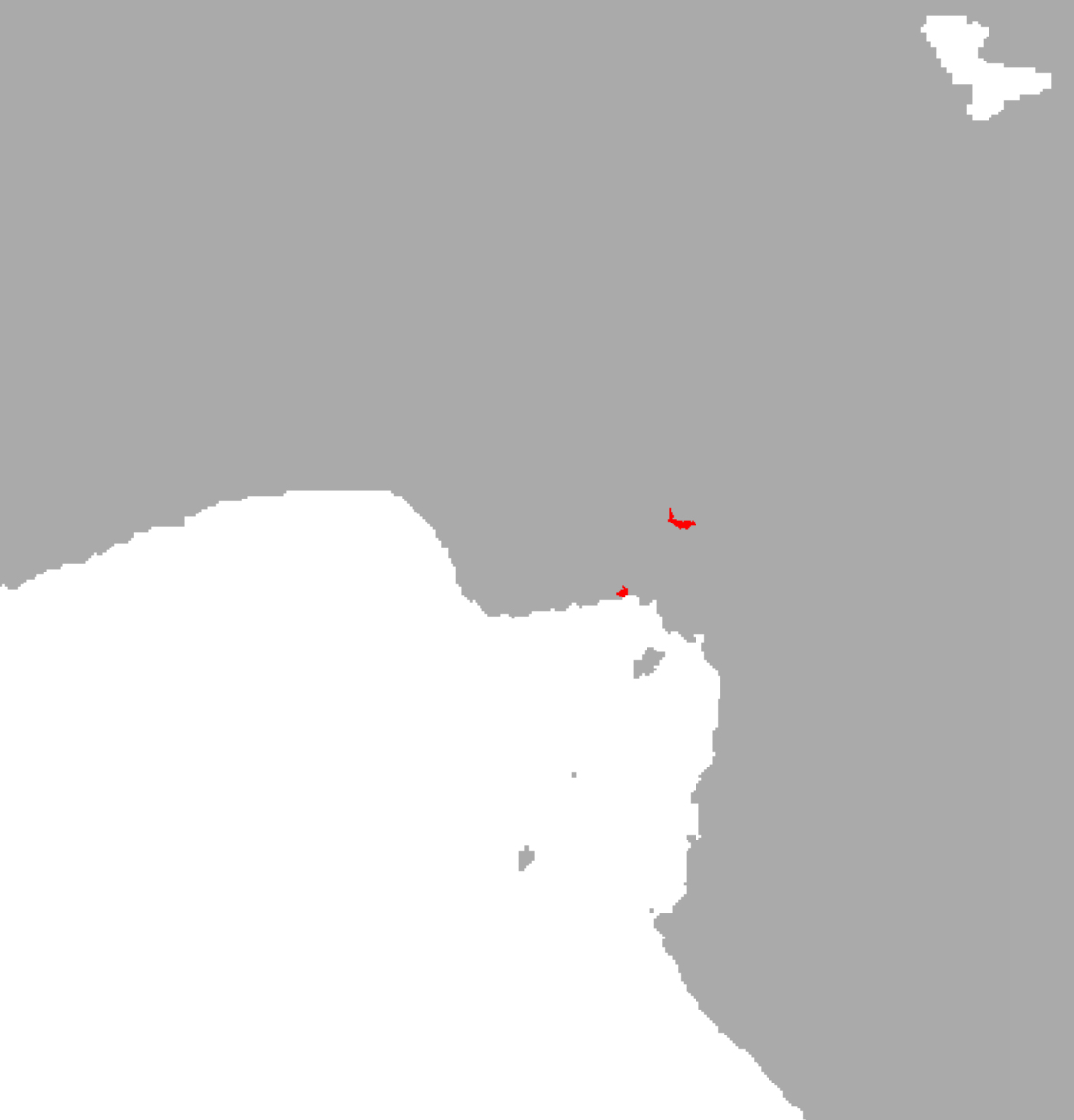

= Redline pufferfish =

Species of fish

Tetraodon pustulatus, commonly known as the Cross River pufferfish or Redline pufferfish, is a species of freshwater pufferfish endemic to the Cross River system in south-western Nigeria. It belongs to the family Tetraodontidae and is listed as Endangered on the IUCN Red List due to its restricted distribution and ongoing habitat degradation.

== Taxonomy ==
The species was described in 1857 by Andrew Murray. It is one of several large African riverine puffers forming the African Tetraodon complex. For much of the twentieth century, T. pustulatus was regarded as a regional form of Tetraodon lineatus, but molecular and morphological studies now confirm that the two are distinct species.

== Description ==
Tetraodon pustulatus reaches approximately 36 cm in length. It resembles T. lineatus but typically has a shorter body, broader head, thicker lips, smaller eyes, and darker or red-toned colouration with reduced vertical striping.

== Distribution and habitat ==
Tetraodon pustulatus occurs exclusively in the Cross River drainage of south-western Nigeria. It inhabits clear, shaded rainforest streams and tributaries where water is soft and acidic. Reported values include conductivity between 20 and 70 µS cm⁻¹, hardness below 5 °dH, pH 5.5–6.5, and temperature 24–26 °C.

== Ecology ==
T. pustulatus feeds on crustaceans, molluscs, and aquatic insects. It occupies fast-flowing channels and backwaters with submerged roots and detritus. The species is territorial, and individuals defend small areas within complex woody habitats. Reproduction has not been recorded in the wild, but spawning is presumed to coincide with early-season rainfall.

== Evolution and relationships ==
Genetic analyses of mitochondrial genes (cytochrome b and COI) indicate that T. pustulatus and T. lineatus diverged between five and ten million years ago, following the geological separation of the Cross River from the Niger system during the late Miocene. The Cameroon Volcanic Line and surrounding highlands act as a long-standing barrier, preventing gene flow and resulting in allopatric speciation.

== Physiology ==
Adaptation to soft, mineral-poor water is reflected in ion-regulatory efficiency and darker pigmentation suited to the low-light, tannin-stained environment of rainforest streams. In contrast, the closely related T. lineatus is adapted to harder, alkaline floodplains subject to greater seasonal change.

== Conservation ==
The species is assessed as Endangered under IUCN criteria B1ab(iii)+2ab(iii). Its habitat faces pressure from logging, agriculture, and mining, which increase sedimentation and mineral load. Collection for the aquarium trade is limited but may contribute to local decline. Conservation efforts focus on preserving the integrity of the Cross River's rainforest headwaters.

== In the aquarium trade ==
T. pustulatus occasionally appears in the aquarium trade but is considered difficult to maintain. It requires large aquaria with very soft, acidic water and is aggressive toward conspecifics. Captive breeding has not been documented.

== Hybridisation ==
Claims of hybridisation between T. pustulatus and T. lineatus have not been verified, and no scientific records confirm such crosses. Hybridisation in pufferfish is known primarily among certain marine Takifugu species under laboratory conditions; reproductive, ecological, and behavioural differences make such events between the African species highly unlikely.

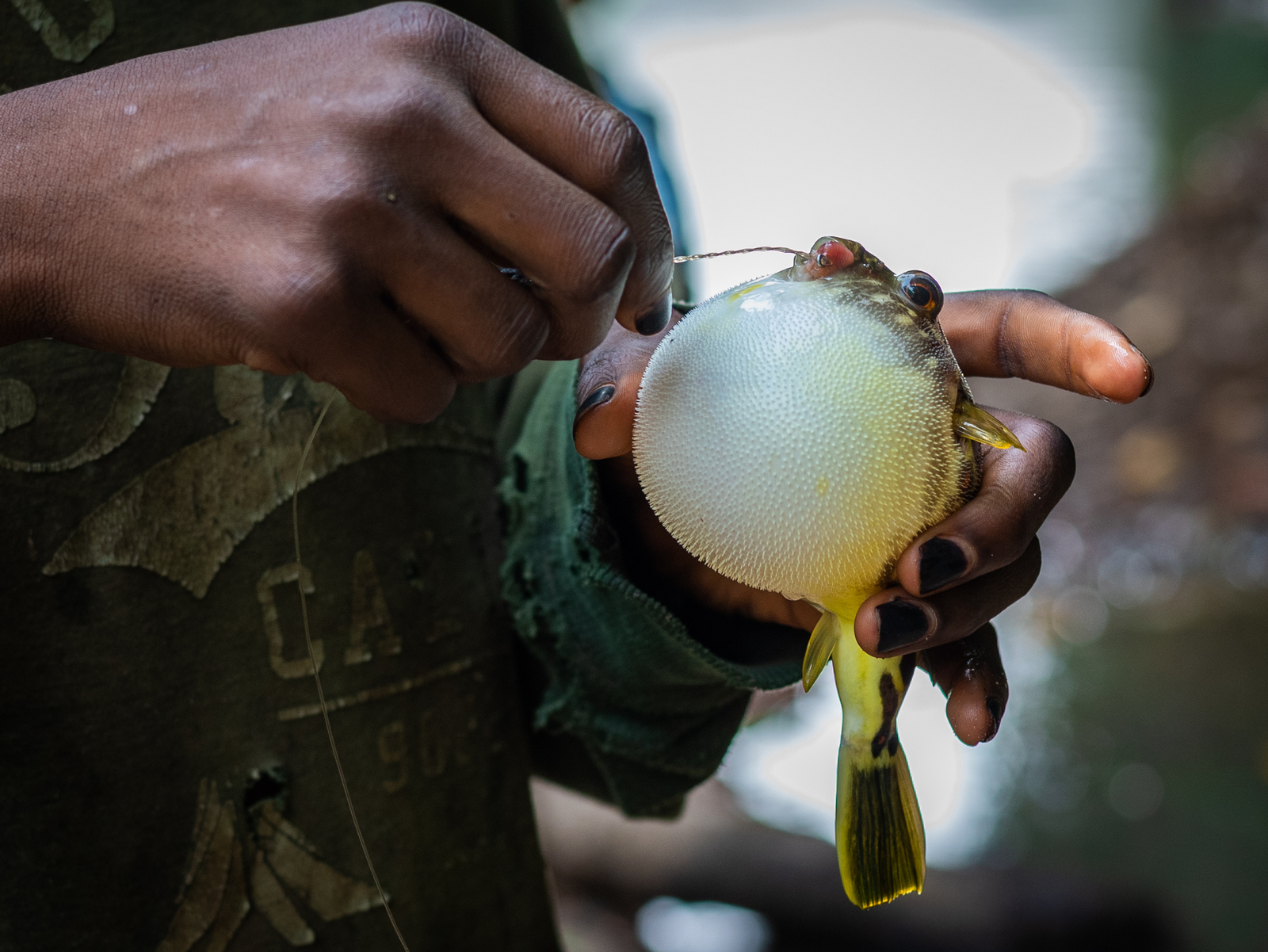
Redline pufferfish blown up after being caught on hook.

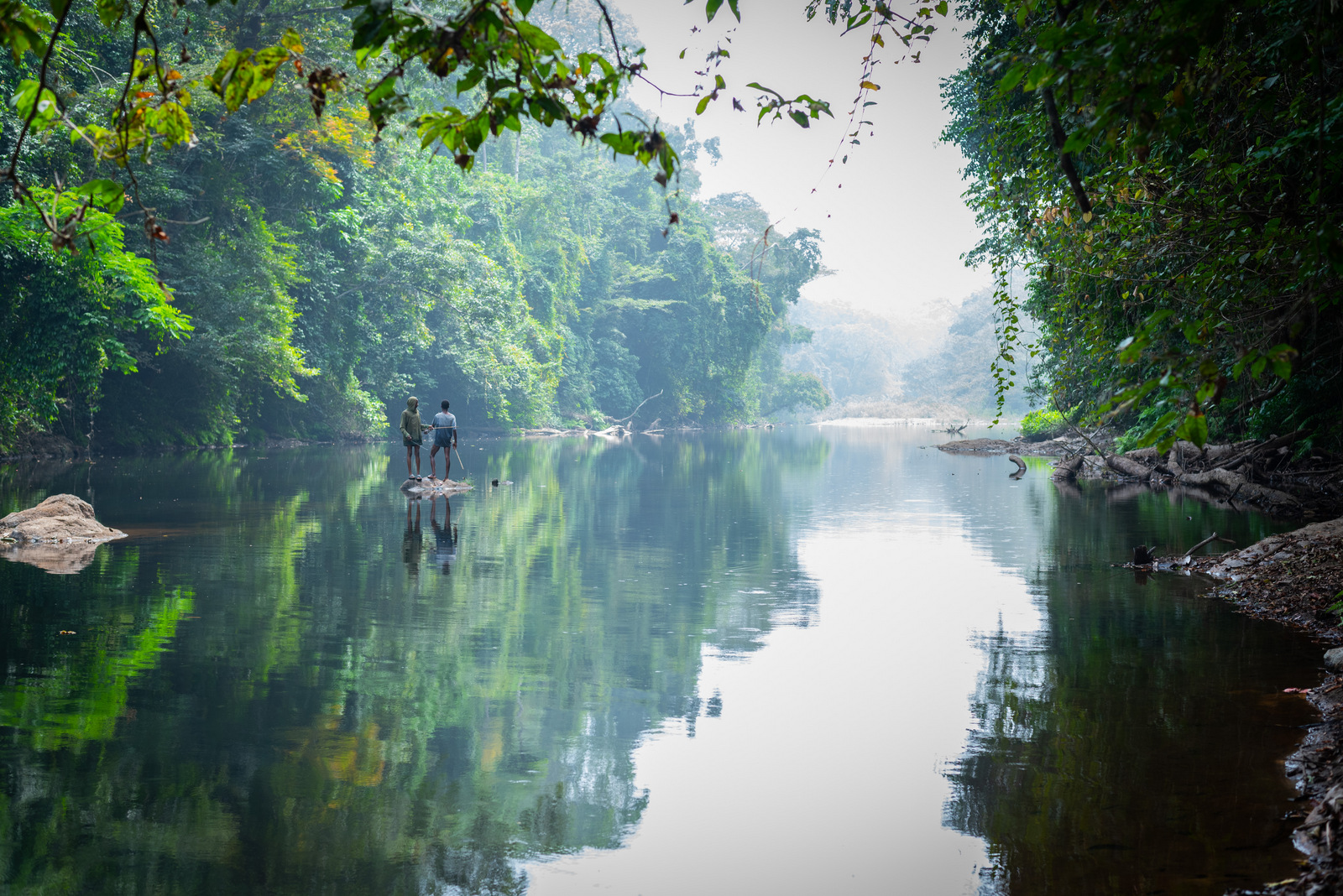
Children fishing pufferfish in river.
