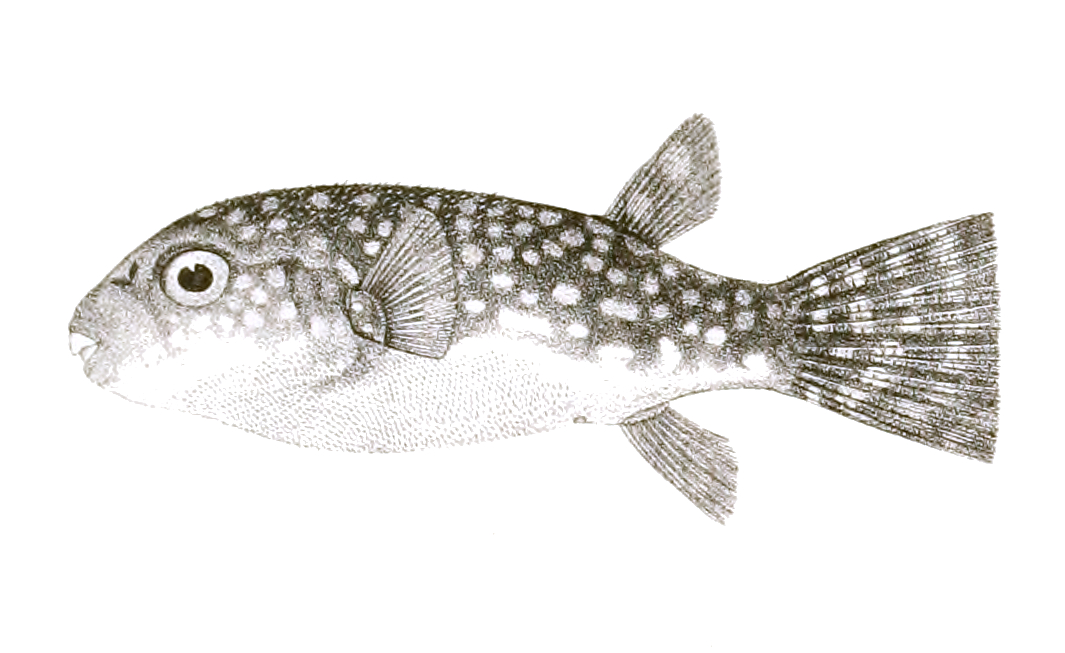

Conservation status
- Data Deficient (IUCN 3.1)

Scientific classification
- Kingdom: Animalia
- Phylum: Chordata
- Class: Actinopterygii
- Order: Tetraodontiformes
- Family: Tetraodontidae
- Genus: Chelonodon
- Species: C. leopardus

Binomial name
- Chelonodon leopardus (Day, 1878)

Synonyms
- Arothron leopardus; Tetraodon leopardus; Tetrodon leopardus; Chelonodontops leopardus Day, 1878

= Chelonodon leopardus =

Species of fish

Chelonodon leopardus, known as the banded leopard blowfish, is a species of pufferfish in the family Tetraodontidae. It is a tropical marine species native to the Indian Ocean, where it is known from India, although its status as a species is uncertain and FishBase has stated that more references are needed to confirm its classification.
