= Tetraodon schoutedeni =

Conservation status
- Data Deficient (IUCN 3.1)

Scientific classification
- Kingdom: Animalia
- Phylum: Chordata
- Class: Actinopterygii
- Division: Teleostei
- Order: Tetraodontiformes
- Family: Tetraodontidae
- Genus: Tetraodon
- Species: T. schoutedeni

Binomial name
- Tetraodon schoutedeni Pellegrin, 1926
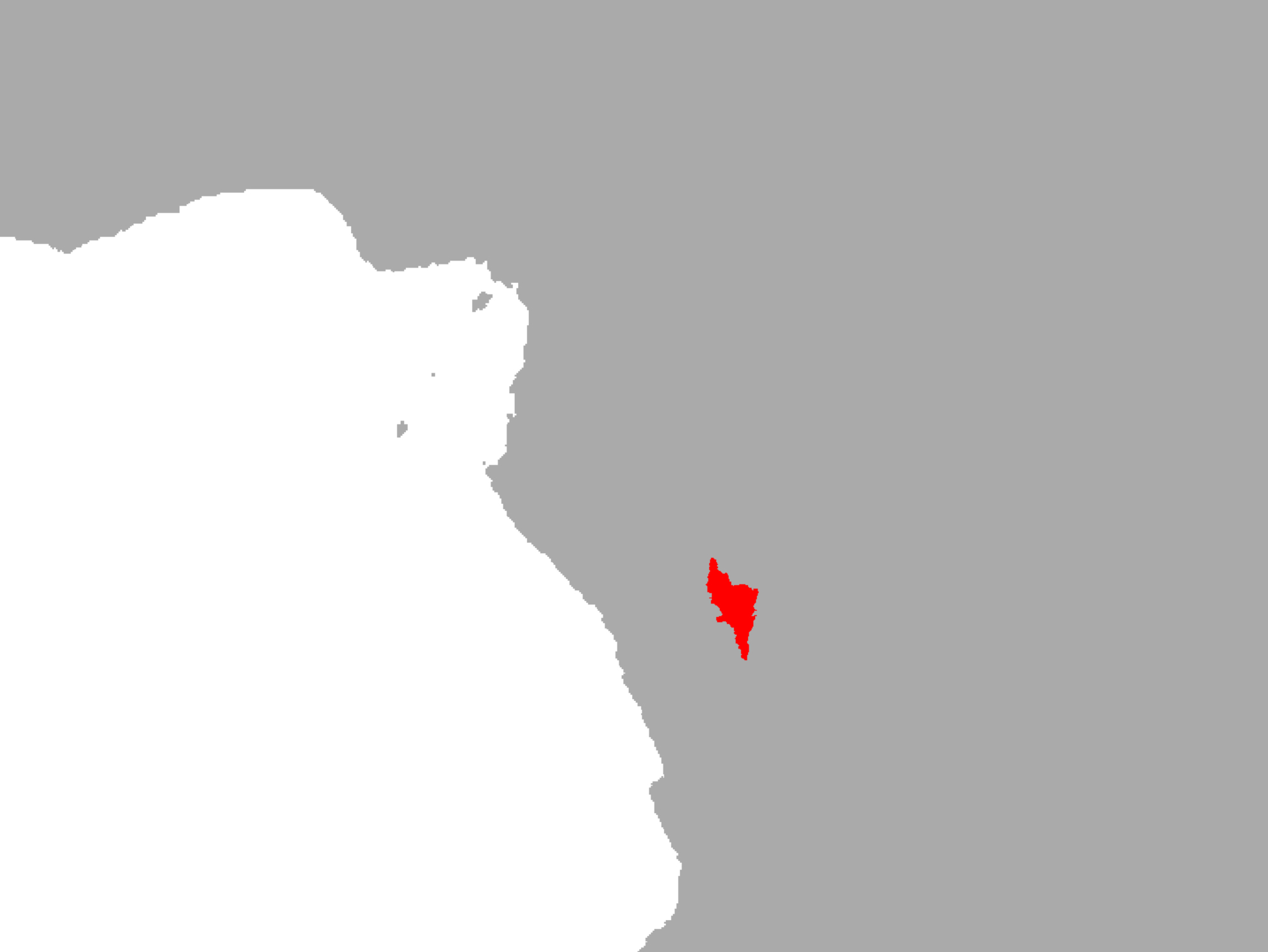

Species of fish

Tetraodon schoutedeni is a species of pufferfish native to Africa's Congo Basin. Growing to a length of 9–11.5 cm (3.5–4.5 in), the species features a slightly rounded, globular body plan that tapers into a teardrop towards the tail; a design often seen in puffers. Additionally, they feature a light brownish-green body covered in black spots which derive its common name of the "Spotted Congo Puffer". this brownish-green body plan features scaleless skin that may oftentimes change color depending on environmental conditions and possible stress responses within the individual fish. The rest of the body design is conducive of the general anatomy of species belonging to the Tetraodon genus. These features include largely independently moving eyes, the ability to inflate their body and puff up as a defense mechanism, and a sharp beak composed of fused teeth that allow them to crack open their prey, which generally consists of insects and shelled organisms. Moreover, they contain the most distinctive feature of Tetraodon, which is tetrodotoxin, a neurotoxin that is enveloped within the skin and internal organs of the fish, although the species is not nearly as toxic as others of its shared genus.

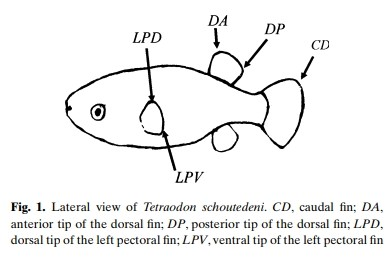
This image depicts the gross fin anatomy of a spotted congo puffer

Regarding sexual dimorphism, this species contains a few key differences between male and female fish. The males are oftentimes around 9 cm(3.5") while females may exceed 4". Additionally, females will appear rounder and slightly more swollen than the males. KFPI indicates that males tend to have a shorter snout and darker coloration of the spots along the cheek line

A smaller freshwater pufferfish, T. schoutedeni predominantly exists within the Lua River and Ubangi River basin within the Republic of Congo, where they are native alongside many other of the Tetraodon genus. This species has been made famous by its small size, unique spotted coloration, and tame social behavior. This makes it a popular choice among aquarium hobbyists.

Originally discovered in 1926, this species is named in honor of the Belgian zoologist Henri Schouteden.

== Distribution ==
Tetraodon Schoutedeni populations are often distributed throughout the Congo Basin, with much of the wild-caught populations being from the Ubangi River Basin. This species is believed to have invaded into freshwater from the northern coast of Africa 17–38 million years ago. Based on current studies, it is assumed that this species was the result of a single common ancestor between T. schoutedeni and four other species which diverged within the Congo Basin, giving us the species we observe today.

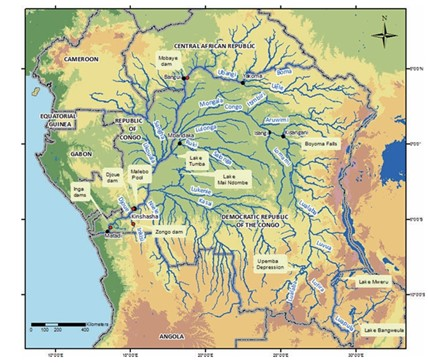
Map of the Congo River Basin

The modern range of T. schoutedeni is largely relegated to the Ubangi River Basin and the Lua River. While there isn't much information regarding other bodies of water, it is generally accepted that these species are widespread throughout this general region of the Congo River. Due to the demersal nature of the species, these fish are found within the large river systems where they can feed on benthic invertebrates, predominantly insects and mollusks. These fish are also strictly freshwater, making their environment more unique when compared to most other pufferfish, which are usually suited towards brackish or marine ecosystems.

== In captivity ==
During the 1960s the Tetraodon schoutedeni was among the most commonly kept species of freshwater pufferfish in the ornamental fish trade and a species which was often bred in captivity.

As a result of exports in wild caught fish being drastically reduced during the Congo Crisis and other events of civil war in the region, the species virtually disappeared from the fishkeeping hobby. However, exports of wild caught examples are now becoming very common and the species has been subject to several captive breeding endeavours. As a consequence there has been a sharp rise in the popularity of this species since circa 2018.

One catalyst of their popularity has been the erroneous claim that they are a very peaceful species, exhibiting no aggression towards conspecifics and allspecifics alike. The Tetraodon schoutedeni is very capable of unprovoked aggression and they are observed to be a loosely social species. It is recommended that they are kept either singularly or in a group consisting of at least six conspecifics, to evenly distribute aggression, with a female to male ratio of 2:1. This can often be understood through the generalized approach to understanding aggression dispersal. If conspecifics have a single individual to focus their aggression on, it will often lead to the death of one of the fish. However, if the aggression is spread between 5 or more fish, oftentimes there isn't enough to cause significant damage. Overall, while the species can be aggressive, it often is very peaceful with other fish and its own kind (when in the correct proportions). Understandably, this character combined with the small-sized and pure freshwater environment that make the T. schoutedeni such a popular species in the hobby.

== Biology and Reproduction ==
Given the political turmoil that made accessibility of this fish limited for the pet industry, in captivity breeding efforts have developed greatly to better understand and distribute these pufferfish. Considering this, fish ethologists have come to understand their courting behavior greater than most other fish, especially because T. schoutedeni is so unique in this area.

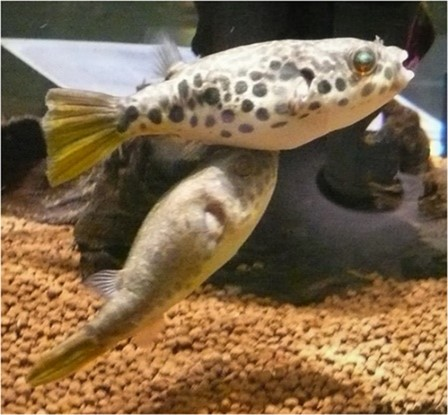
Biting behavior exhibited during spawning

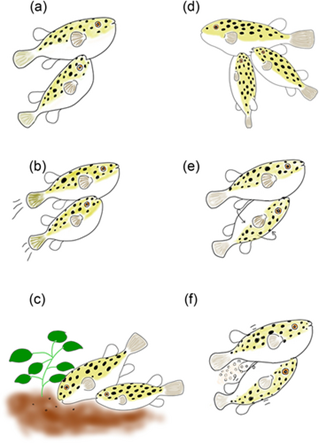
Tandem spawning behavior of the Tetraodon Schoutedeni

The initiation of mating behavior begins with tandem swimming events where no actual spawning behavior occurs. In this unique case for this African freshwater puffer, a female can initiate in a pair or even trio with two males clung to its stomach. This has been observed to occur twice, often starting in the afternoon with actual spawning occurring in the late afternoon. Successful spawning behavior led to the male initiating biting behavior, which exhibits the male biting and clinging to the female's abdomen. This is then followed by the first round of tandem swimming, which leads to periods of the male biting and clinging to the abdomen of the female until she is ready to mate. Once the female is ready, there is a reorientation of the male before spawning which aligns the bellies of the two fish to initiate a successful spawn. The weakly adhesive eggs will then scatter onto the substrate or any décor to be left unguarded by either parent. Standard batches can generally range from 3–50 eggs. Parents will often exhibit instances of eating their eggs as well as the eggs of others. This entire process will often last around 100 minutes.

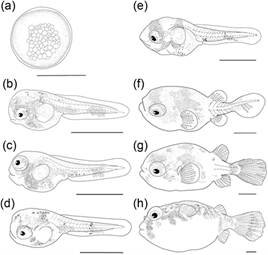
Neonatal Development of Tetraodon Schoutedeni

Eggs will form embryos with a small oil globule after around 2 days, with eyes coming around 5. Subsequent hatching from the eggs comes only a week after spawning. Upon leaving the egg, the larvae continue to form their fin folds, mouth and anus using the large yolk sac as a nutrition source. Melanophores then start to become especially present after 10 days, giving that distinct coloration the species is known for. Past this stage, the fish develops into a fully mature adult in around a year, where they will be able to begin the spawning process over again.

== Conservation Status ==
Not much is known about the populations in the wild, though many speculate that the native populations have been affected by the political turmoil in Congo, due to the environmental destruction that had come as a product. However, due to the modern ability of aquarium hobbyists and researchers to breed this unique species, the Tetraodon Schoutedeni population in captivity appears to be relatively stable.

There is no current defined status as the IUCN points to it being data deficient at this time.

== Diet ==
In the wild this species preys upon freshwater snails, other benthic animals and insect larvae. In captivity is recommended to feed them snails, earthworm, fresh insects and insect-based foods. These species, like other pufferfish, retain teeth that grow forever. So, it is imperative that they are fed hard foods that can grind down their beaks, otherwise impairment of their jaws and feeding mechanisms can become present. The bicarbonate shells of snails and clams usually keep the beaks filed down in the wild. In captivity, these species can often prove difficult to be trained on anything other than small clams and snails. Many report success with bloodworms, artificial foods, and other insects, but it may very well depend on the individual.
