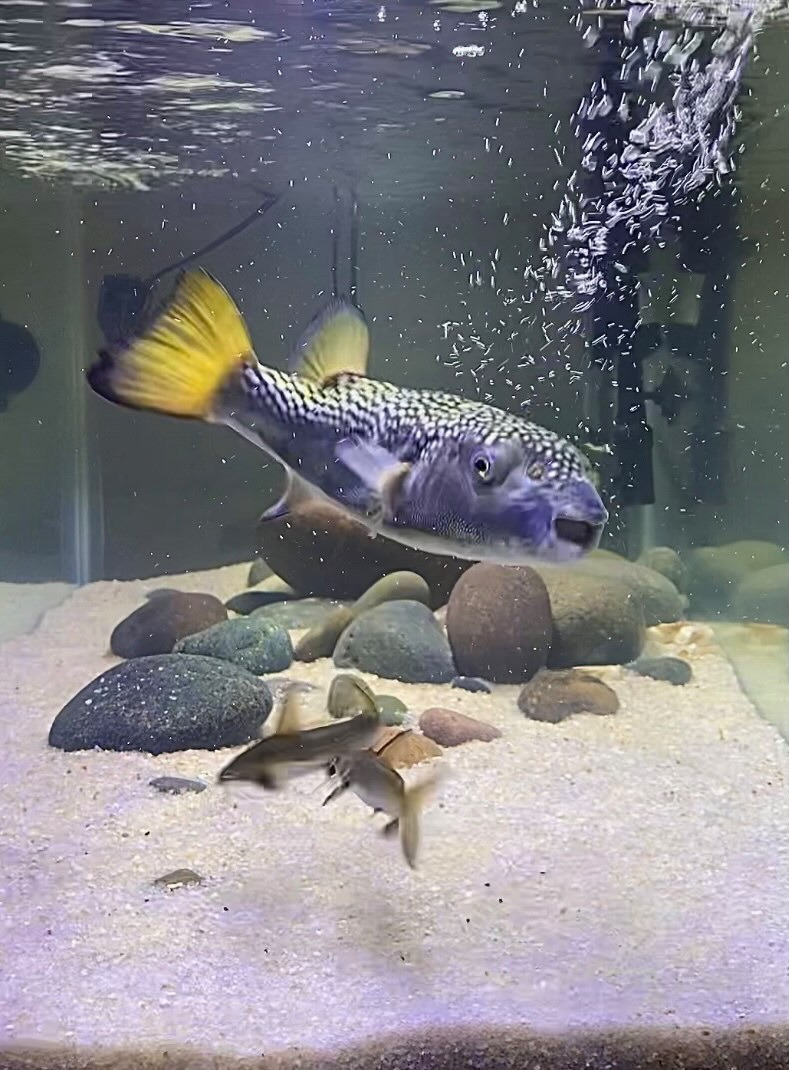

Scientific classification
- Domain: Eukaryota
- Kingdom: Animalia
- Phylum: Chordata
- Class: Actinopterygii
- Order: Tetraodontiformes
- Family: Tetraodontidae
- Genus: Chelonodontops
- Species: C. bengalensis

Binomial name
- Chelonodontops bengalensis Habib et al., 2018

Synonyms
- Chelonodon bengalensis

= Chelonodontops bengalensis =

Species of fish

Chelonodontops bengalensis, also known as Bengal reticulated puffer, is a species of pufferfish in the family Tetraodontidae. It was first discovered at Alor Kol in Dublar Char of Bangladesh. It is found in the northern Bay of Bengal in Bangladesh and India.

Though C. bengalensis is closely related to C. patoca, they are distinct species. A group of researchers from Bangladesh and South Korea ran their scientific research from May 2016 to December 2017 in Sundarban and discovered the new species of pufferfish. The color of the species is blackish and it has tints like trellis. It can grow to 32 cm (13 in) standard length.
