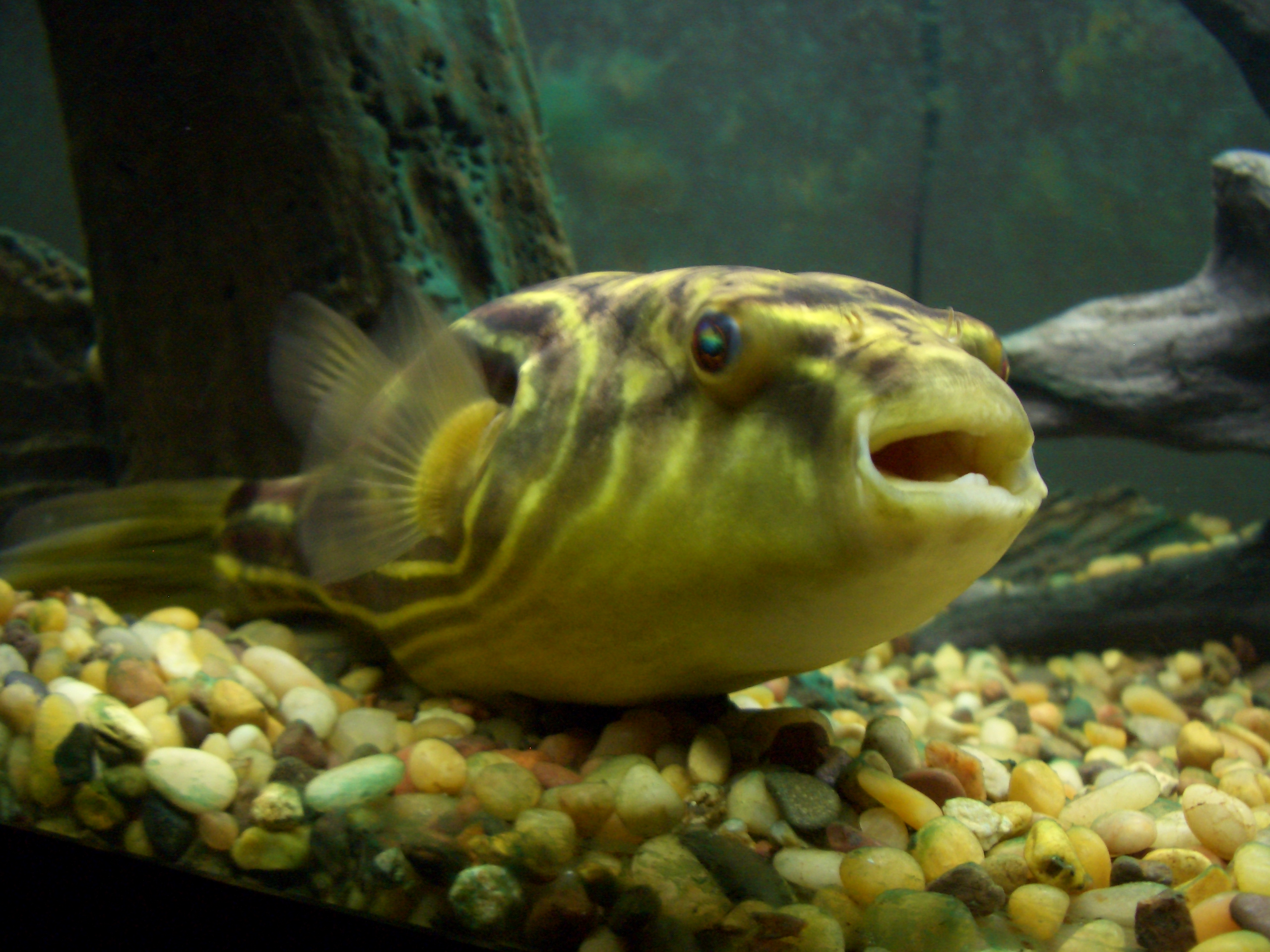

Conservation status
- Least Concern (IUCN 3.1)

Scientific classification
- Kingdom: Animalia
- Phylum: Chordata
- Class: Actinopterygii
- Order: Tetraodontiformes
- Family: Tetraodontidae
- Genus: Tetraodon
- Species: T. lineatus

Binomial name
- Tetraodon lineatus Linnaeus, 1758
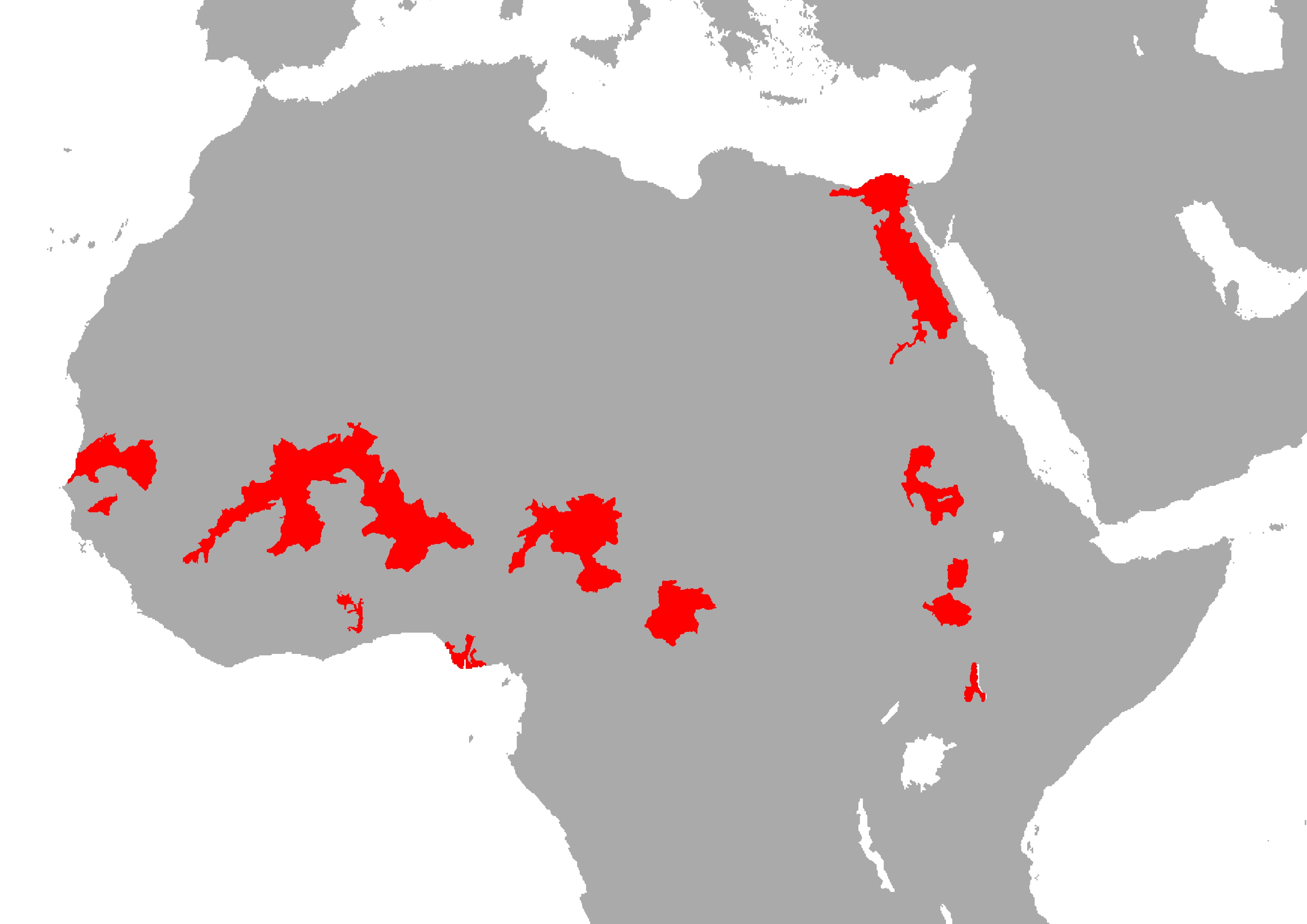

= Fahaka pufferfish =

Species of fish

The fahaka pufferfish (from Arabic: فهقة), also known as the Nile puffer, globe fish, lined puffer (Tetraodon lineatus), is a tropical freshwater pufferfish found in the upper Nile, Chad, Senegal, Gambia, Geba, Volta and Turkana basins in West, Northeast and East Africa.

== Characteristics ==
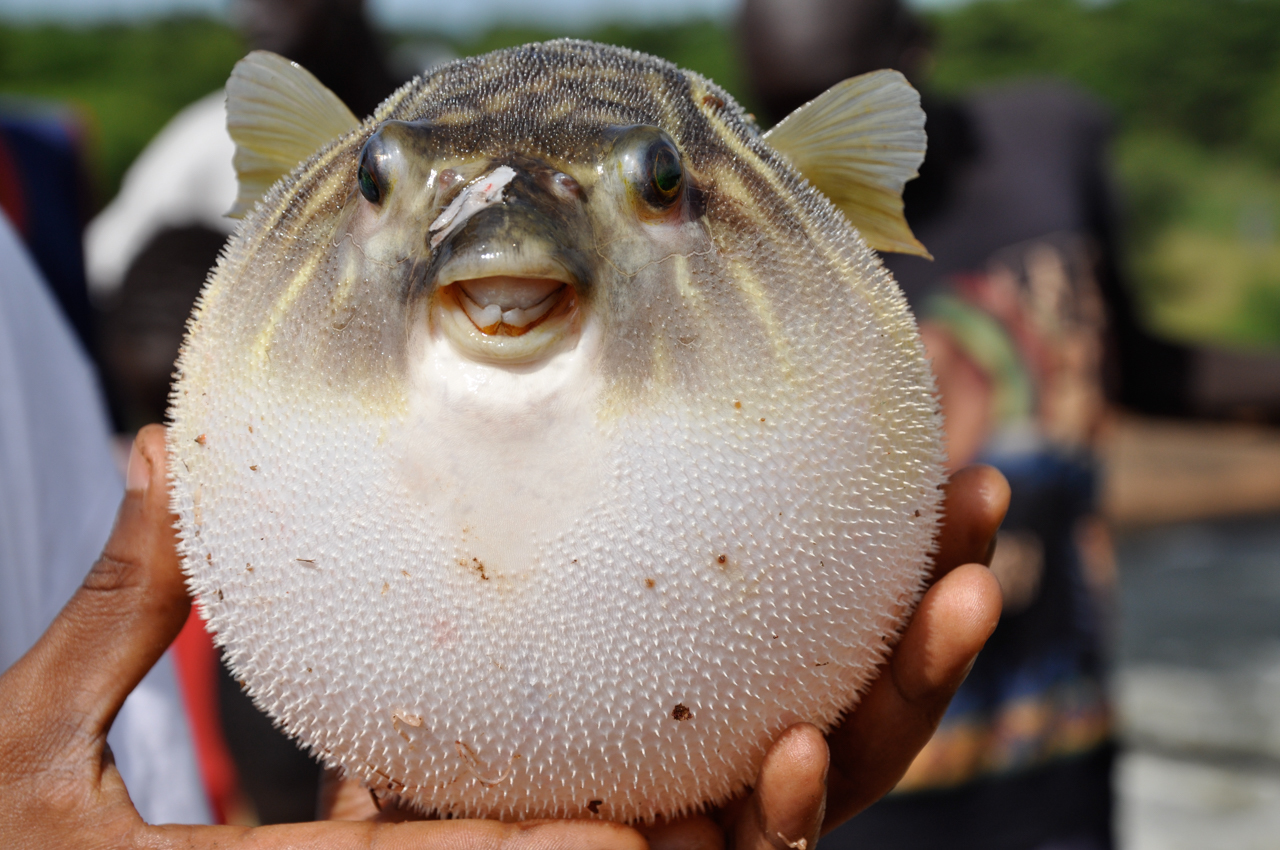
Inflated. In Ethiopia.

Fahaka pufferfish can reach up to 43 cm (1.4 ft) in length. They have the ability to inflate when threatened and, like many puffers, carry the toxin tetrodotoxin.

Fahaka pufferfish, like other molluscivores, feed mainly on benthic organisms which may include freshwater mussels and snails. They are typically found in large rivers, open water, weed beds and vegetated fringes.

In the River Nile, the recorded average lifespans of Fahaka pufferfish have measured about five years.

Researchers AbouelFadl and Farrag have measured the gonadosomatic index of the Fahaka pufferfish to increase from April to August. They have interpreted these readings to suggest a spawning season during this period.

== Gallery ==
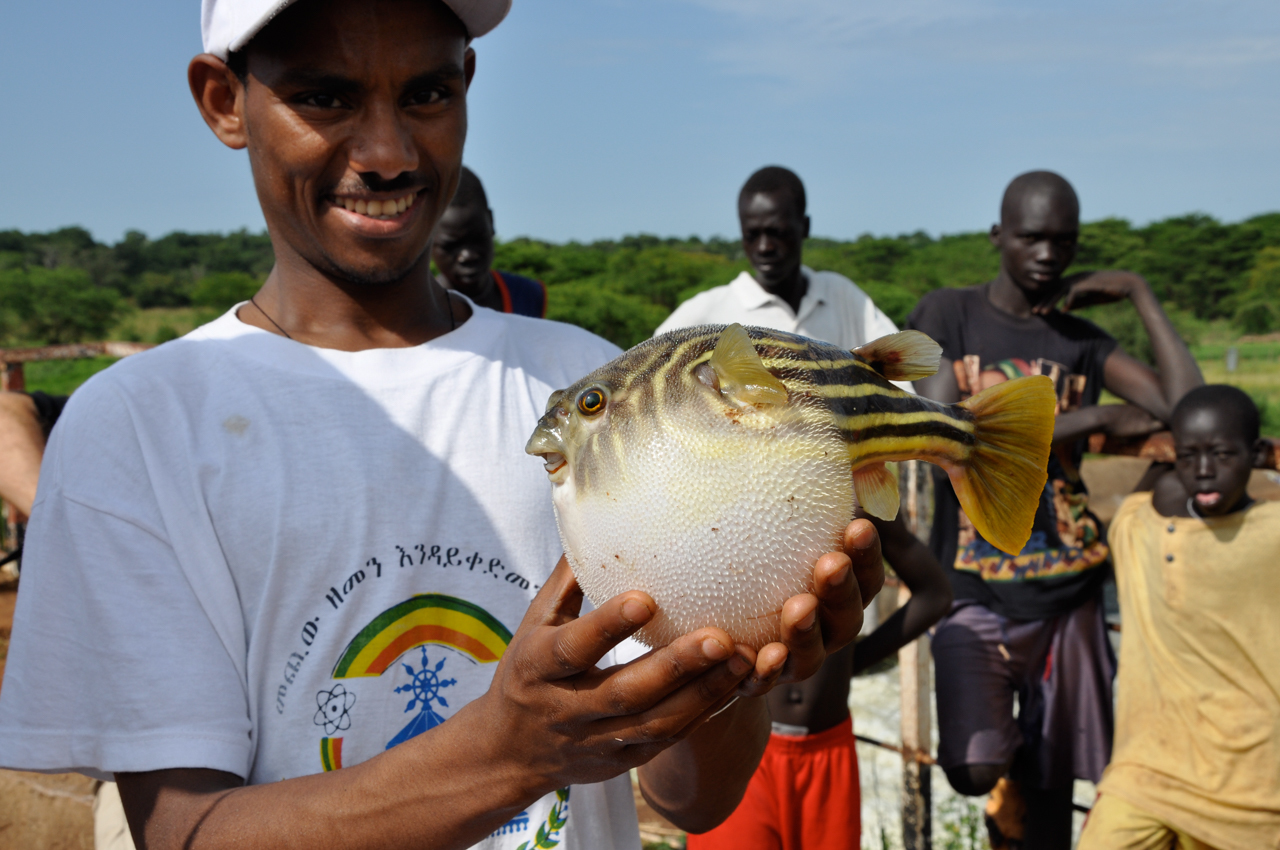
Inflated, Ethiopia

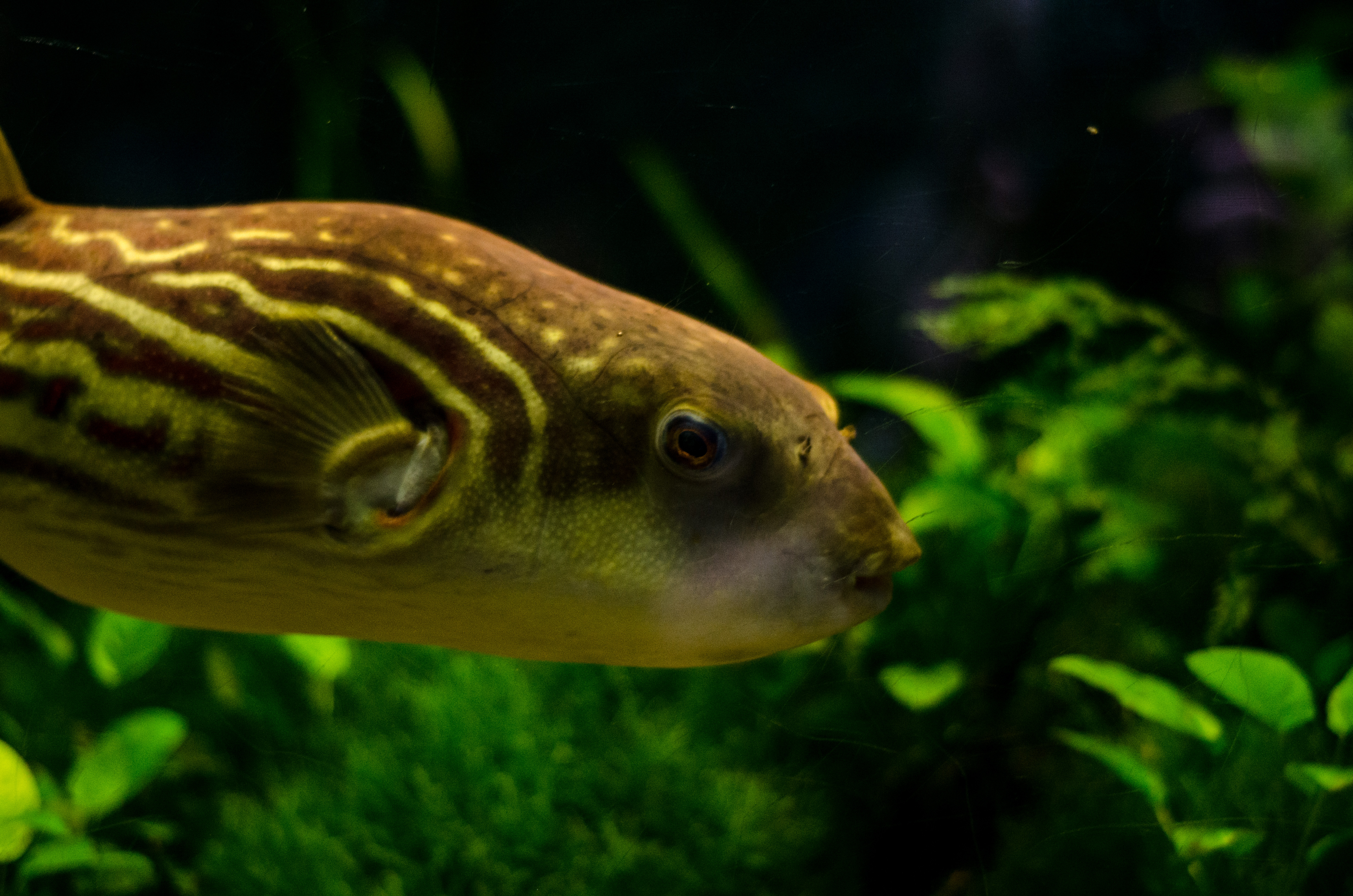

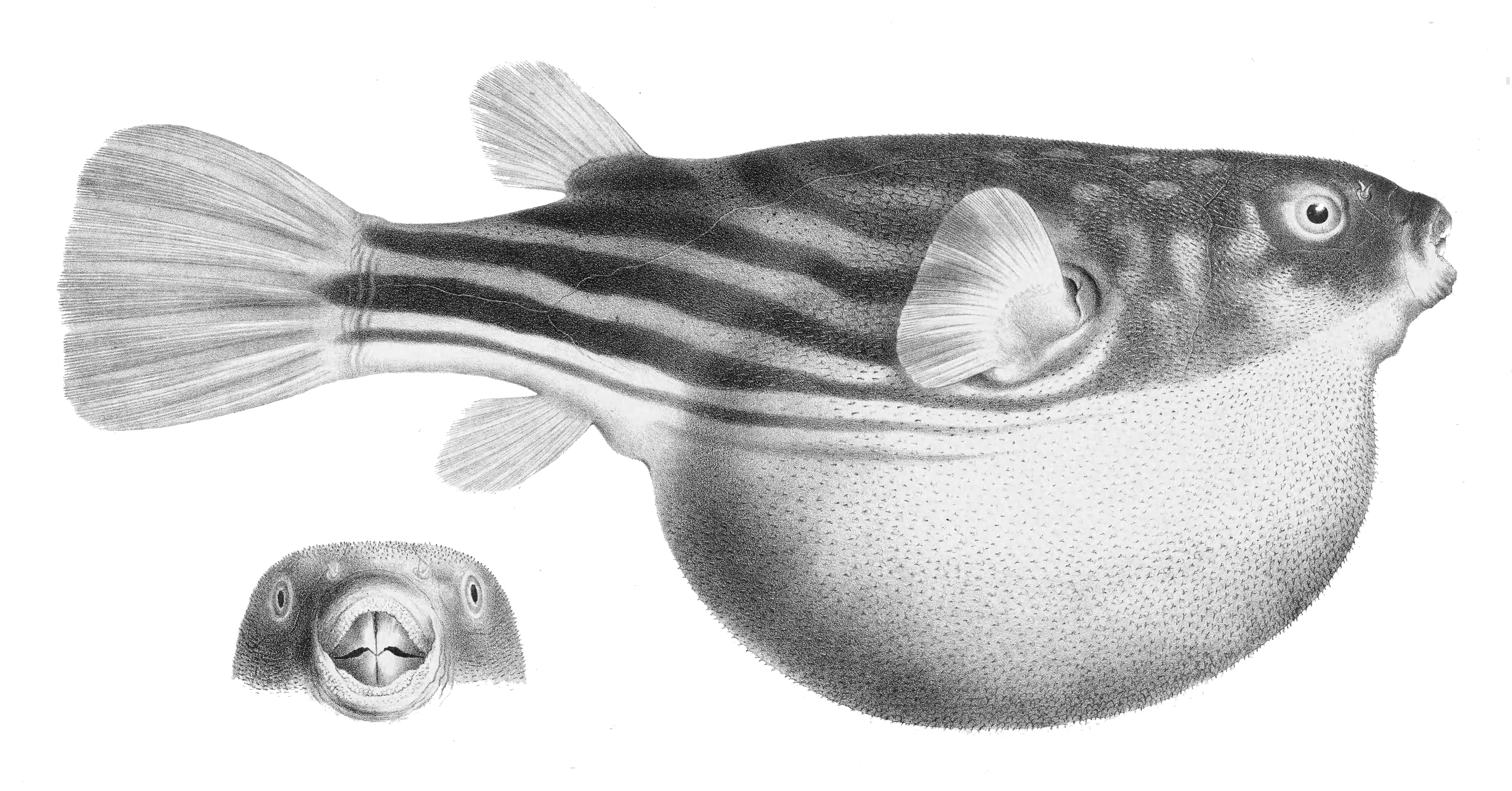
1907 illustration
