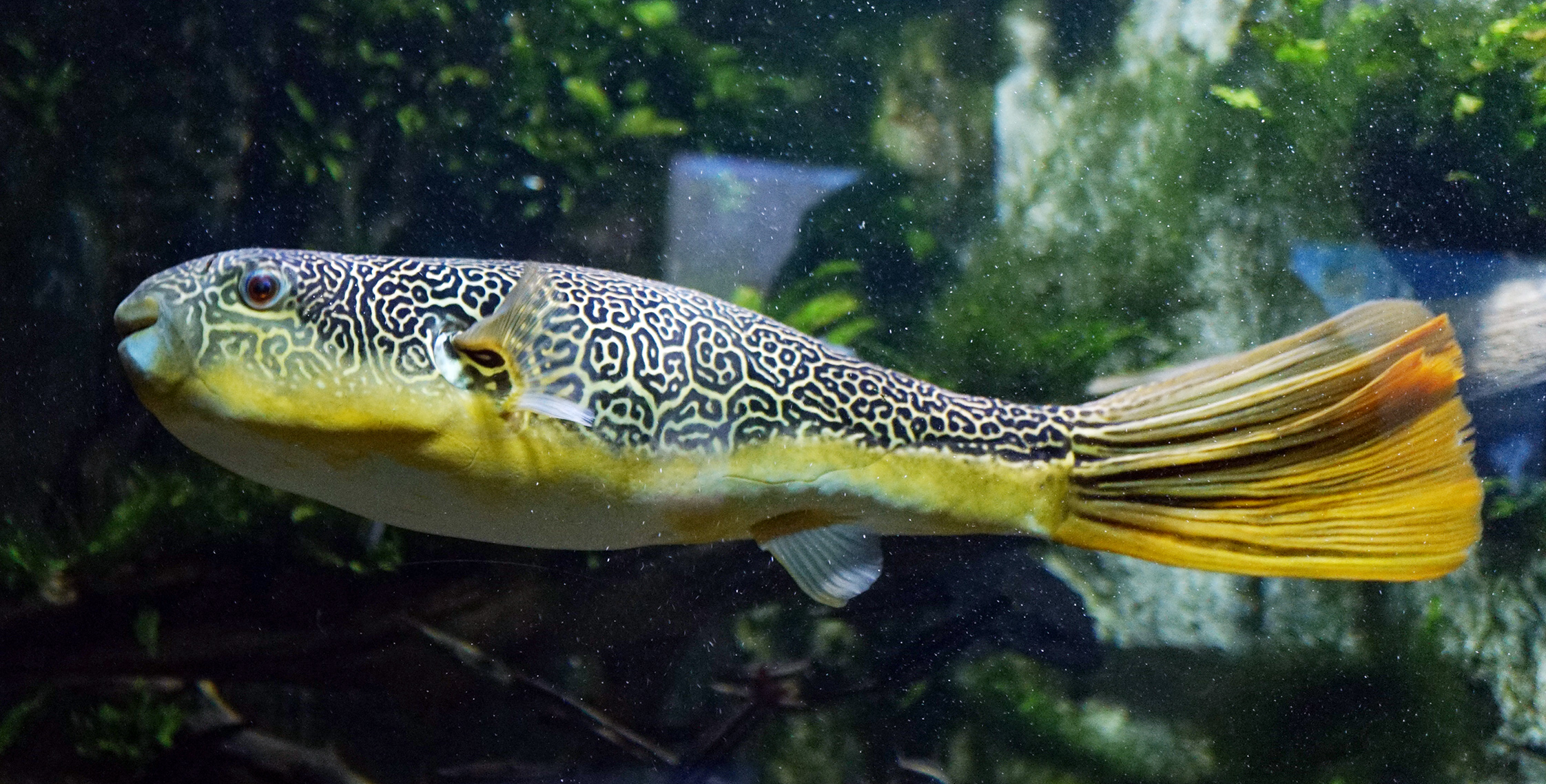
- Mbu pufferfish (T. mbu)
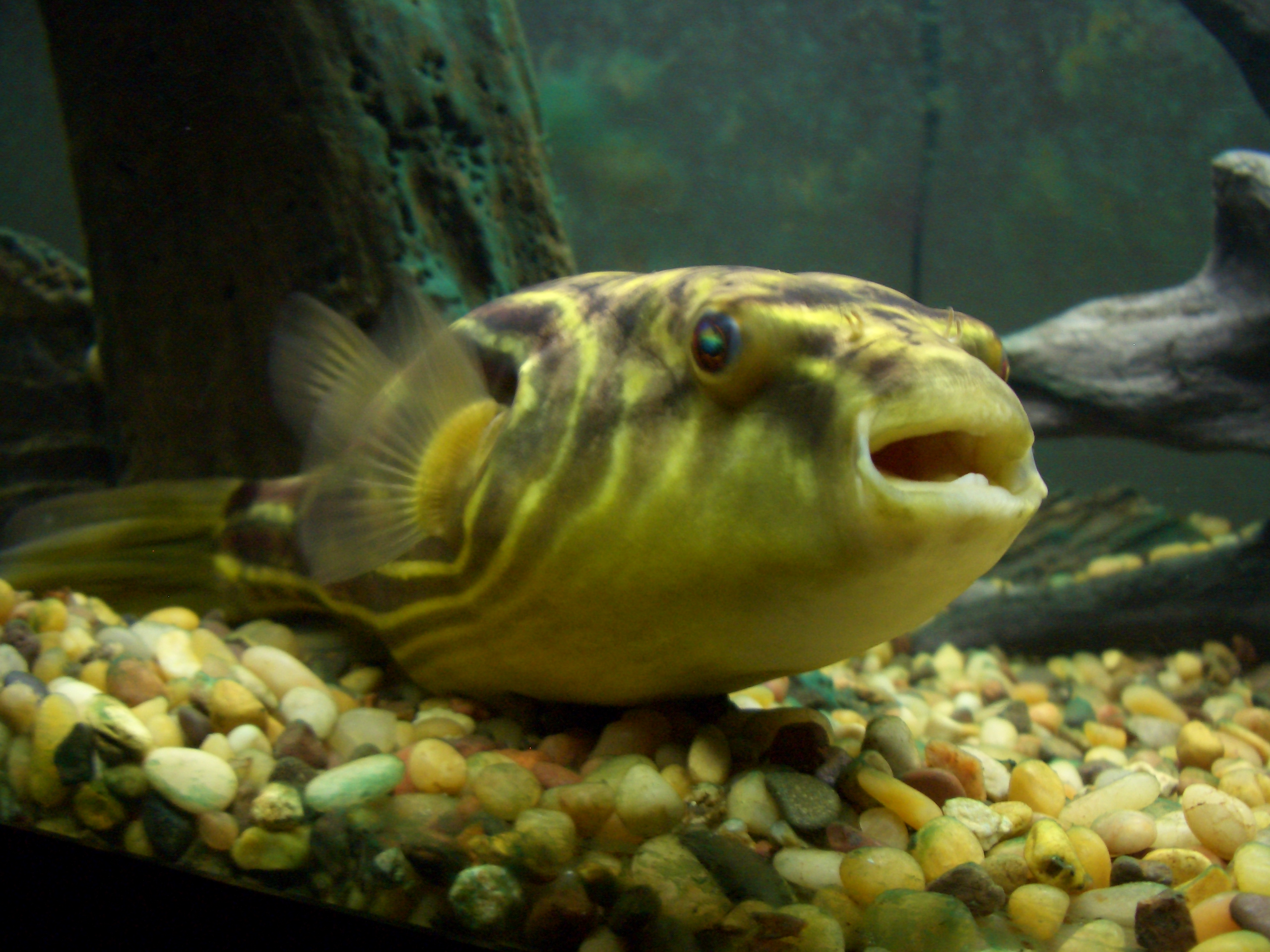
- Fahaka pufferfish (T. lineatus)

Scientific classification
- Kingdom: Animalia
- Phylum: Chordata
- Class: Actinopterygii
- Division: Teleostei
- Order: Tetraodontiformes
- Family: Tetraodontidae
- Subfamily: Tetraodontinae
- Genus: Tetraodon; Linnaeus, 1758

Type species
- Tetraodon lineatus Linnaeus, 1758
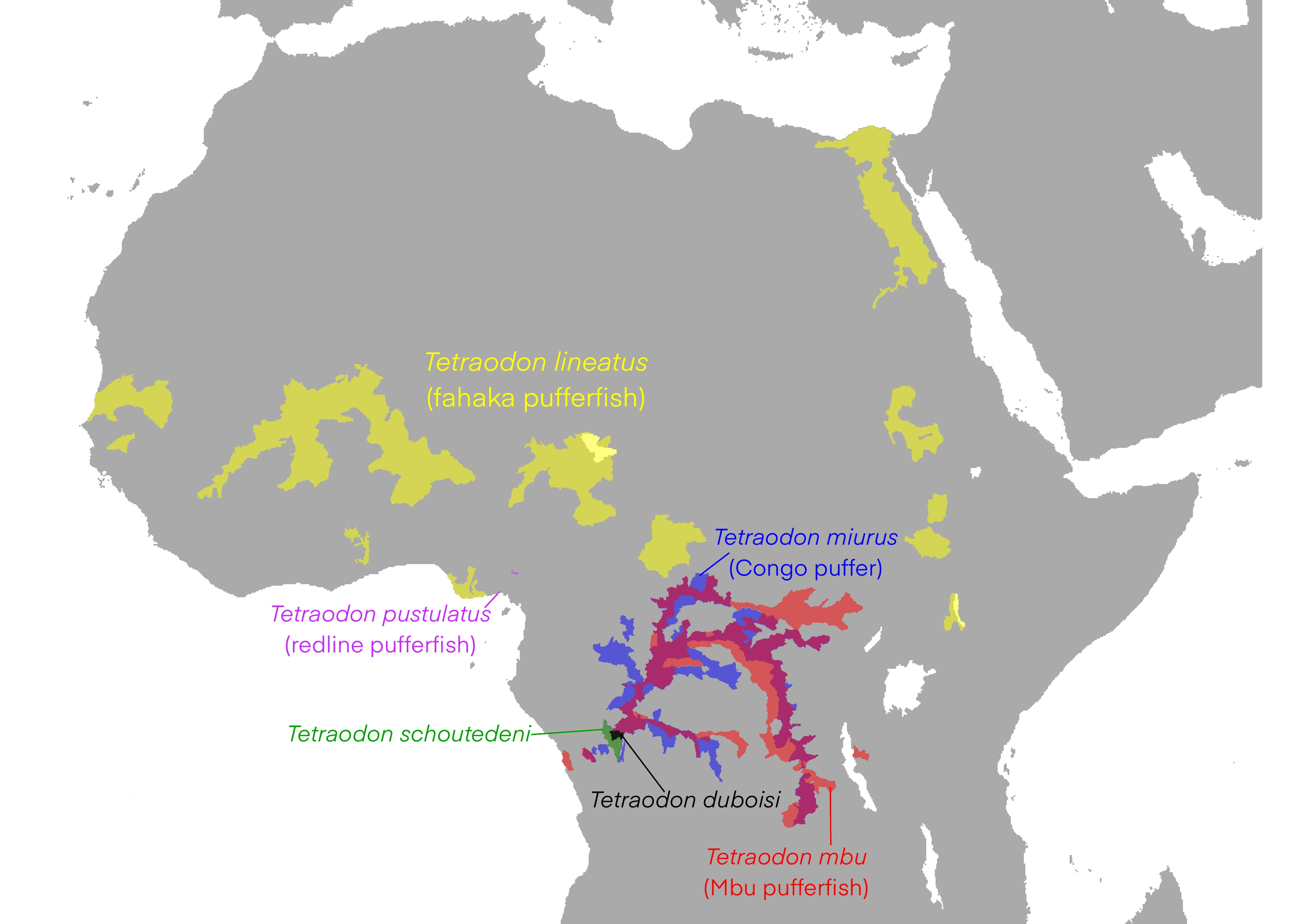
- Native distribution of Tetraodon species (both extinct and extant)

= Tetraodon =

Tetraodon Temporal range: Middle Miocene to present

Genus of fishes

Tetraodon is a genus in the pufferfish family (Tetraodontidae) found in freshwater in Africa. It is the type genus of the family and historically included numerous other species; several Asian species were moved to the genera Dichotomyctere, Leiodon and Pao in 2013. The genus name comes from Ancient Greek τετρα- (tetra-), meaning "four", and ὀδούς (odoús), meaning "tooth", referring to the genus' four teeth.

== Species ==
There are 6 recognized species in this genus:

- Tetraodon duboisi Poll, 1959
- Tetraodon lineatus Linnaeus, 1758 (Fahaka pufferfish, Nile pufferfish, lineatus puffer or globe fish)
- Tetraodon mbu Boulenger, 1899 (mbu pufferfish or giant pufferfish)
- Tetraodon miurus Boulenger, 1902 (Congo pufferfish or potato pufferfish)
- Tetraodon pustulatus A. D. Murray, 1857 (Cross River pufferfish)
- Tetraodon schoutedeni Pellegrin, 1926

The following cladogram is based on a 2013 analysis of Tetraodontid mitogenomes:

- - Omegophora
  - Arothron
- - Chelonodon
  - Tetraodon
    - - Tetraodon lineatus
      - Tetraodon pustulatus
    - - Tetraodon mbu
      - - Tetraodon miurus
        - - Tetraodon duboisi
          - Tetraodon miurus
