= Chelonodontops laticeps =

Conservation status
- Least Concern (IUCN 3.1)

Scientific classification
- Kingdom: Animalia
- Phylum: Chordata
- Class: Actinopterygii
- Order: Tetraodontiformes
- Family: Tetraodontidae
- Genus: Chelonodontops
- Species: C. laticeps

Binomial name
- Chelonodontops laticeps (Smith, 1948)

Synonyms
- Chelonodon laticeps Smith 1948

Species of fish

Chelonodontops laticeps, also known as the bluespotted blaasop, is a species of pufferfish in the family Tetraodontidae. It is native to the western Indian Ocean on the coast of Africa, from South Africa north to Tanzania, and around Madagascar. FishBase includes also Papua New Guinea (Western Central Pacific) in its range.

It is a tropical species found in quiet, weedy areas of marine and brackish waters. It reaches 20 cm (7.9 in) in total length.
