= Leiodon =

Scientific classification
- Kingdom: Animalia
- Phylum: Chordata
- Class: Actinopterygii
- Order: Tetraodontiformes
- Family: Tetraodontidae
- Genus: Leiodon; Swainson, 1839

Synonyms
- Leisomus Swainson, 1839; Chelonodon J. P. Müller, 1841; Monotrète Bibron, 1855; Monotretus Troschel, 1856; Monotreta Hollard, 1857

Genus of fish

Leiodon is a genus of pufferfishes consisting of two species.

== Species ==
- Leiodon cutcutia (Hamilton, 1822) (Indian Ocean, Asia)
- Leiodon dapsilis (Whitley, 1943) (Western Pacific, Australasia)
