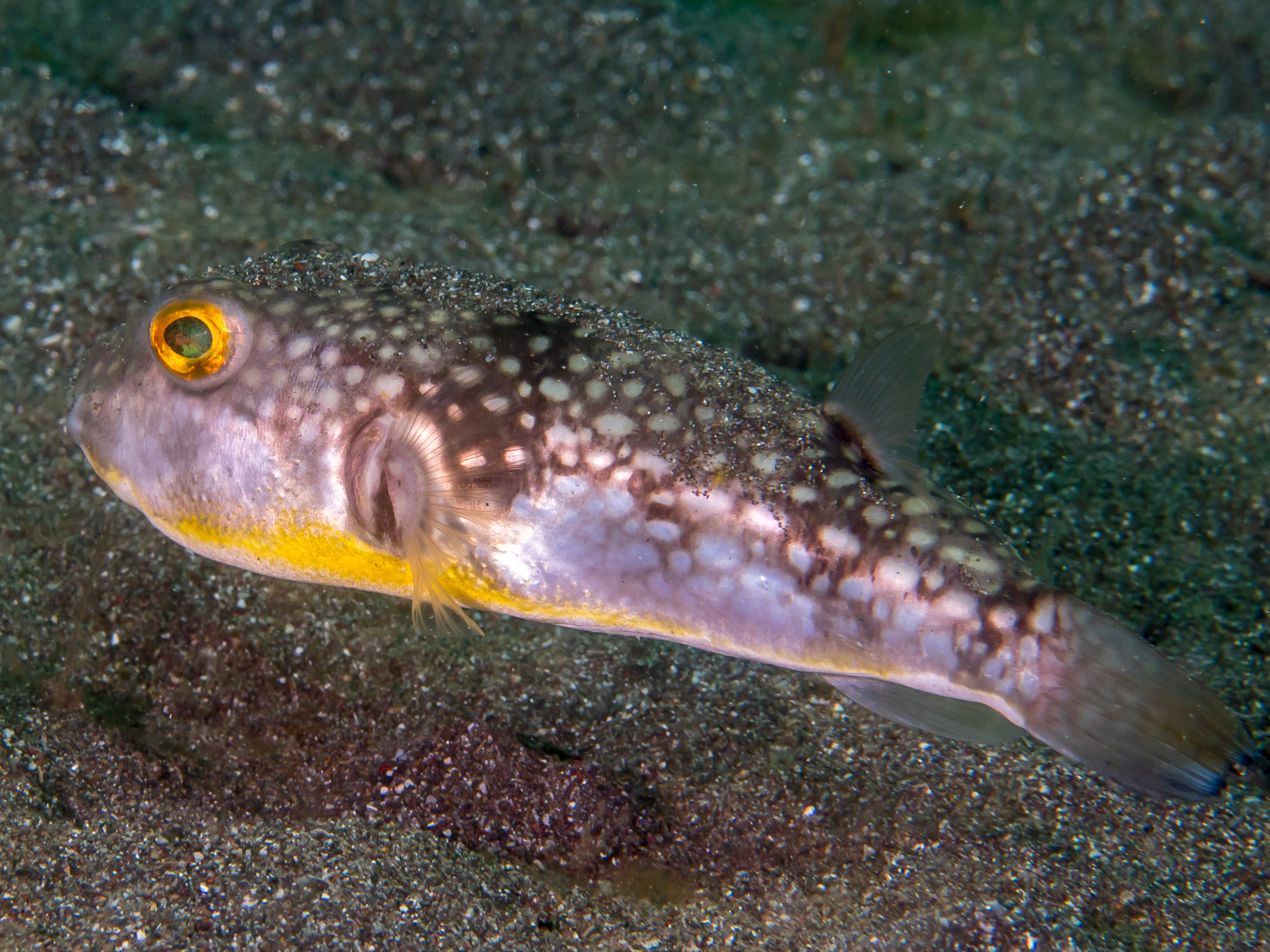

Conservation status
- Least Concern (IUCN 3.1)

Scientific classification
- Kingdom: Animalia
- Phylum: Chordata
- Class: Actinopterygii
- Order: Tetraodontiformes
- Family: Tetraodontidae
- Genus: Chelonodontops
- Species: C. patoca

Binomial name
- Chelonodontops patoca (Hamilton, 1822)

Synonyms
- Arothron kappa; Cheilichthys kappa; Chelondon patoca; Chelonodon kappa; Leiodon patoca; Tetraodon kappa; Tetraodon patoca; Tetrodon dissutidens; Tetrodon patoca

= Chelonodontops patoca =

Species of fish

Chelonodontops patoca, also known as the milk-spotted pufferfish, milkspotted puffer, milkspotted toadfish, Gangetic blow fish, Gangetic pufferfish, or marbled toad, is a species of pufferfish in the family Tetraodontidae native to the Indo-Pacific. It ranges from East Africa to the Western Pacific from Korea in the north to northern Australia in the south. It is a tropical species that occurs in coastal waters, lagoons, estuaries, and rivers. While it does enter fresh water, the species does not occur more than a few kilometres from the sea. It is often seen in schools which sometimes enter freshwater streams. It is usually found at a depth range of 4 to 60 m (13 to 197 ft) and reaches 38 cm (15 in) standard length. The species is poisonous but reportedly considered a delicacy in Japan.
