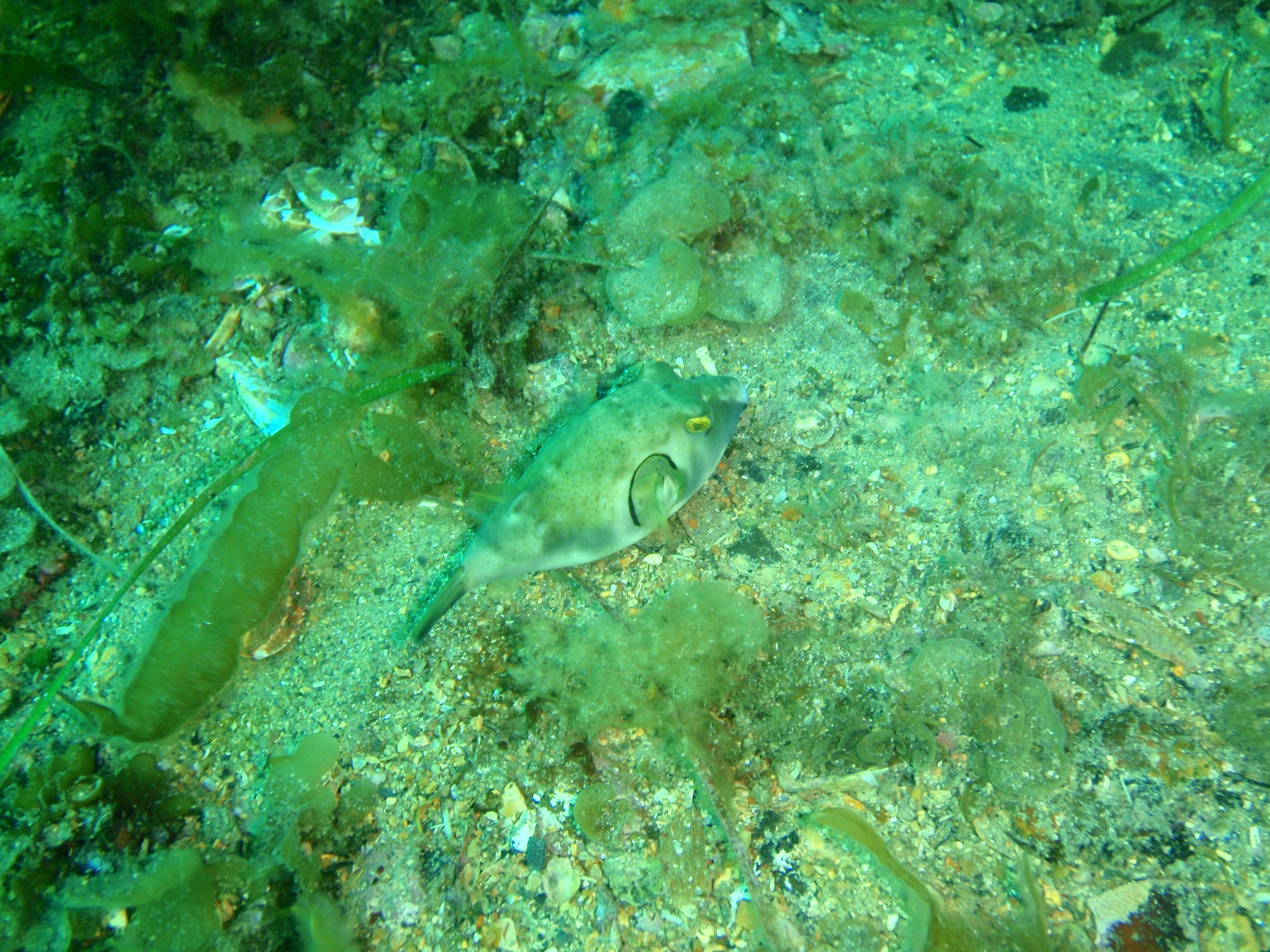

Conservation status
- Least Concern (IUCN 3.1)

Scientific classification
- Kingdom: Animalia
- Phylum: Chordata
- Class: Actinopterygii
- Order: Tetraodontiformes
- Family: Tetraodontidae
- Genus: Omegophora
- Species: O. armilla

Binomial name
- Omegophora armilla Waite & McCulloch, 1915

= Ringed toadfish =

Species of pufferfish

The ringed toadfish (Omegophora armilla) is a species of puffer in the family Tetraodontidae. It grows up to 25 cm (9.8 in) in length, and is poisonous to consume. It has a black ring surrounding its pectoral fins, and an oval-like body covered in small spines.

== Distribution, habitat, and feeding ==
It lives in seagrass beds, rocky reefs, and sandy bottoms from 1 to 146 meters deep. It is found in the eastern Indian Ocean, around southern Australia. Its prey consists of small, benthic invertebrates, making it a carnivore.

== Conservation ==
It is sometimes bycatched in Australian fisheries, and its aquatic resources are being harvested, but these factors do not impact it much. It has no specific threats, and its distribution overlaps with marine protected areas, so it has been listed as Least Concern by the IUCN Red List.

== Taxonomy ==
Omegophora armilla is one of two species in its genus, alongside the bluespotted toadfish (Omegophora cyanopunctata), with which it overlaps.
