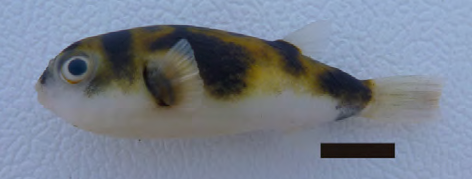
- Tocantins, Brazil, scale bar = 1 cm

Scientific classification
- Domain: Eukaryota
- Kingdom: Animalia
- Phylum: Chordata
- Class: Actinopterygii
- Order: Tetraodontiformes
- Family: Tetraodontidae
- Genus: Colomesus
- Species: C. tocantinensis

Binomial name
- Colomesus tocantinensis Amaral, Brito, Silva & Carvalho, 2013

= Colomesus tocantinensis =

Species of pufferfish

Colomesus tocantinensis is a species of pufferfish in the family Tetraodontidae. It is endemic to Brazil, where it inhabits the Tocantins River basin. It reaches a length of 3.5 cm (1.4 inches) SL. The species was described in 2013 by Cesar R. L. Amaral, Paulo M. Brito, Dayse A. Silva, and Elizeu F. Carvalho based on morphology and genetic evidence, both of which separate it from its congeners Colomesus asellus and C. psittacus.
