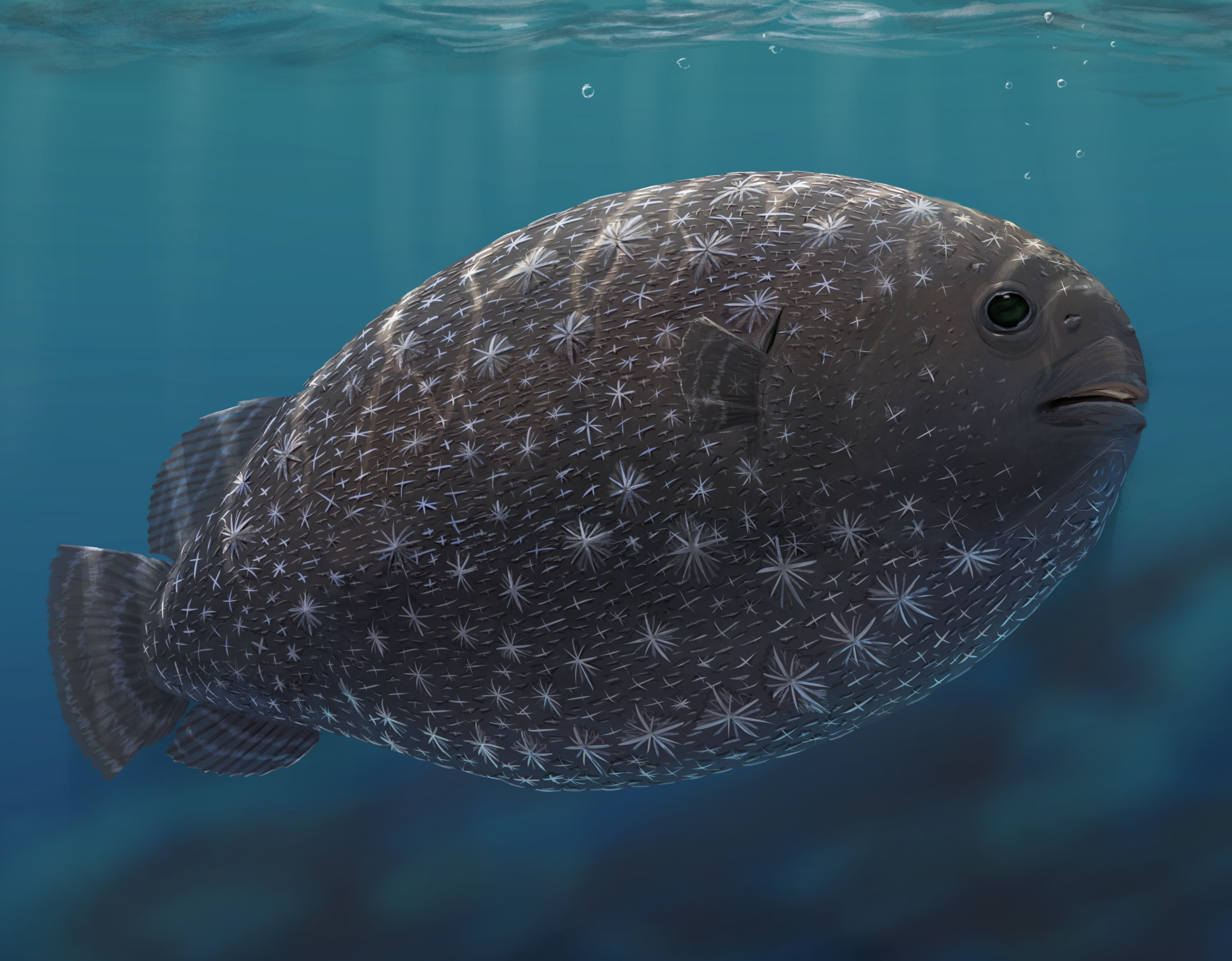
- Artist's reconstruction

Scientific classification
- Kingdom: Animalia
- Phylum: Chordata
- Class: Actinopterygii
- Order: Tetraodontiformes
- Family: Tetraodontoidea
- Genus: †Iraniplectus; Tyler, Mirzaie & Nazemi 2006
- Species: †I. bakhtiari

Binomial name
- †Iraniplectus bakhtiari Tyler, Mirzaie & Nazemi 2006

= Iraniplectus =

Extinct genus of fishes

Iraniplectus bakhtiari is an extinct relative of modern-day pufferfish and porcupine fish from the Middle Oligocene of Iran. It is closely related to the Eocene Zignoichthys.
