= Marilyna meraukensis =

Scientific classification
- Kingdom: Animalia
- Phylum: Chordata
- Class: Actinopterygii
- Order: Tetraodontiformes
- Family: Tetraodontidae
- Genus: Marilyna
- Species: M. meraukensis

Binomial name
- Marilyna meraukensis (de Beaufort, 1955)

Synonyms
- Sphoeroides meraukensis

Species of pufferfish

Marilyna meraukensis, known as the Merauke toadfish, is a species of pufferfish in the family Tetraodontidae. It is a tropical brackish-water species known from New Guinea and northern Australia, where it occurs in mangrove estuaries and tidally influenced sections of rivers. It reaches 19 cm (7.5 inches) SL.
