= M. darwinii =

M. darwinii may refer to:

- Marilyna darwinii
- Moruloidea darwinii
- Mylodon darwinii, an extinct genus of giant ground sloth

== See also ==
- M. darwini (disambiguation)
- Darwinii (disambiguation)
