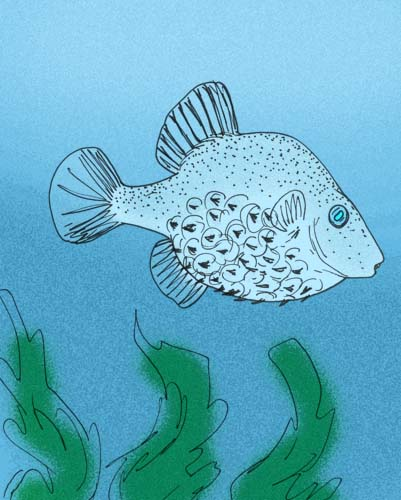
- Artist's reconstruction

Scientific classification
- Kingdom: Animalia
- Phylum: Chordata
- Class: Actinopterygii
- Order: Tetraodontiformes
- Family: †Zignoichthyidae
- Genus: †Zignoichthys; Tyler, 1975
- Species: †Z. oblongus

Binomial name
- †Zignoichthys oblongus Tyler, 1975

= Zignoichthys =

Extinct species of fish

Zignoichthys oblongus is an extinct prehistoric relative of the pufferfish and porcupine fish that lived during the Lutetian epoch of the Eocene. Z. oblongus fossils are found from the Monte Bolca lagerstätte of what is now Italy.

It lacked a pelvis, and probably could not inflate its body like its modern-day relatives. In life, it would have resembled a paunchy triggerfish or a pufferfish with an elongated, downturned face.

== See also ==
- List of prehistoric bony fish
- Iraniplectus, a close relative from Oligocene Iran
- Eotetraodon, a genus of primitive pufferfish, one species, E. pygmaeus, lived sympatrically with Z. oblongus
