= G. formosa =

G. formosa may refer to:

- Geothlypis formosa, a New World warbler
- Glaucopis formosa, an African moth
- Grevillea formosa, a shrub endemic to Northern Territory
- Guentheridia formosa, a pufferfish native to the coasts of the eastern Pacific Ocean
