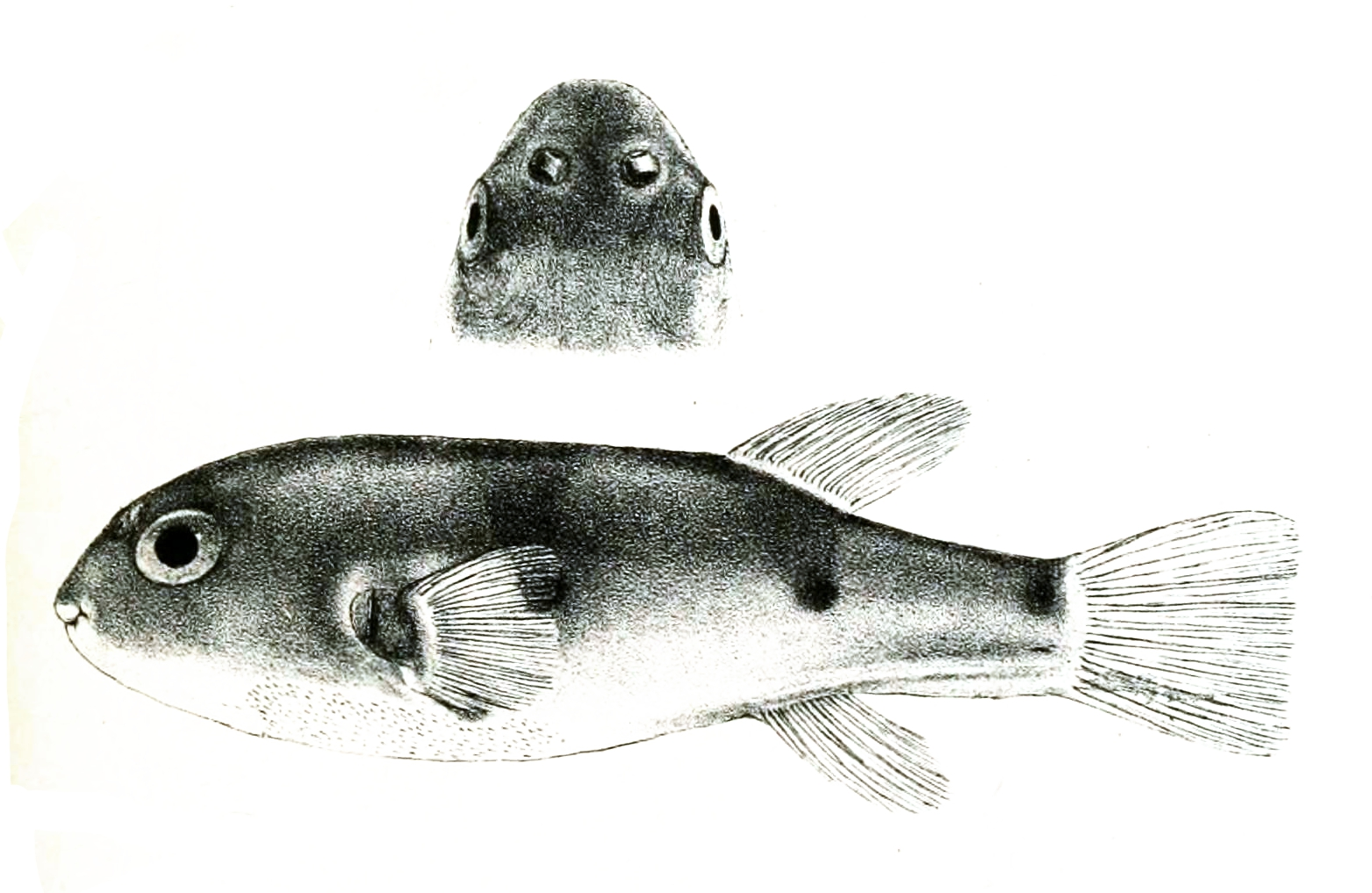

Scientific classification
- Domain: Eukaryota
- Kingdom: Animalia
- Phylum: Chordata
- Class: Actinopterygii
- Order: Tetraodontiformes
- Family: Tetraodontidae
- Genus: Marilyna
- Species: M. pleurosticta

Binomial name
- Marilyna pleurosticta (Günther, 1872)

Synonyms
- Sphoeroides pleurostictus; Tetrodon pleurostictus

= Marilyna pleurosticta =

Species of pufferfish

Marilyna pleurosticta, known as the banded toadfish, is a species of pufferfish in the family Tetraodontidae. It is native to Australia, where it ranges from Darwin to Sydney. It is known from silty and muddy areas in coastal waters and estuaries, although it also enters freshwater regions. It is most frequently seen in tidal channels, mangrove swamps, and salt marshes. It is carnivorous, feeding on gastropods and crustaceans. It reaches 13.5 cm (5.3 inches) SL and is reported to live for up to 30 years.
