= Spiny blaasop =

Conservation status
- Least Concern (IUCN 3.1)

Scientific classification
- Kingdom: Animalia
- Phylum: Chordata
- Class: Actinopterygii
- Order: Tetraodontiformes
- Family: Tetraodontidae
- Genus: Tylerius; Hardy, 1984
- Species: T. spinosissimus

Binomial name
- Tylerius spinosissimus (Regan, 1908)

Synonyms
- Spheroides spinosissimus Regan, 1908; Amblyrhynchotes spinosissimus (Regan 1908); Spheroides unifasciatus von Bonde, 1923

Species of fish

The spiny blaasop (Tylerius spinosissimus) is a species of marine ray-finned fish belonging to the family Tetraodontidae, the pufferfishes. This puffer is native to the Indian Ocean, the southwestern Pacific Ocean and the Atlantic Ocean along the coast of South Africa. It has recently been recorded in the Eastern Mediterranean Sea. This species is the only species in the monospecific genus Tylerius.

== Taxonomy ==
The spiny blassop was first formally described as Spheroides spinosissimus by the English ichthyologist Charles Tate Regan with its type locality given as the Saya de Malha Bank in the western Indian Ocean from a depth of over 123 fathoms (738 ft; 225 m). In 1984 the New Zealand ichthyologist Graham S. Hardy proposed the monospecific genus Tylerius with this species being the type species by monotypy. The genus Tylerius belongs to the family Tetraodontidae.

== Etymology ==
The spiny blassop is the only species in the genus Tylerius, an name that honours the American ichthyologist James C. Tyler in recognition of his considerable contribution to the study of the Tetraodontiformes. The specific name, spinosissimus, means "very spiny", a reference to the head and body being covered with double rooted spines.

== Description ==
The spiny blassop is grey with a dark blotch above and to the rear of the eye, with another at the base of dorsal fin. The posterior margin of caudal fin is black and there are black spots on belly. This species grows to a maximum total length of 12 cm (4.7 in).

== Distribution ==
The spiny blaasop is found in the Atlantic off the southeast coast of South Africa, and in the Indo-Pacific from South Africa to northwestern Australia; northward to South China Sea. It has recently colonised the Levantine waters of the Mediterranean Sea off Rhodes and Turkey, most likely as a Lessepsian migrant from the Red Sea or in ballast water.
