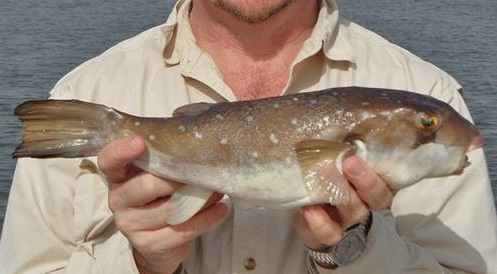

Conservation status
- Least Concern (IUCN 3.1)

Scientific classification
- Kingdom: Animalia
- Phylum: Chordata
- Class: Actinopterygii
- Order: Tetraodontiformes
- Family: Tetraodontidae
- Genus: Ephippion; Bibron, 1855
- Species: E. guttifer

Binomial name
- Ephippion guttifer (E. T. Bennett, 1831)

= Ephippion =

Prickly puffer

Genus of fishes

Ephippion guttifer, commonly known as the prickly puffer, is a species of pufferfish native to the coasts of the eastern Atlantic Ocean from Gibraltar to Angola. This species grows to a length of 80 centimetres (31 in) TL. It is of importance to commercial fisheries and is popular as a gamefish. This species has the ability to get prickly when it puffs up. It is the only known member of the monotypic genus Ephippion.
