= Javichthys =

Conservation status
- Least Concern (IUCN 3.1)

Scientific classification
- Kingdom: Animalia
- Phylum: Chordata
- Class: Actinopterygii
- Order: Tetraodontiformes
- Family: Tetraodontidae
- Genus: Javichthys; Hardy, 1985
- Species: J. kailolae

Binomial name
- Javichthys kailolae Hardy, 1985

Species of fish

Javichthys kailolae is a species of pufferfish known only from the Bali Strait off Java in Indonesia. It has been found at depths of from 62 to 85 metres (200 to 280 ft). The species was described in 1985 and little else is known about it. It is so far the only known member of the monotypic genus Javichthys.
