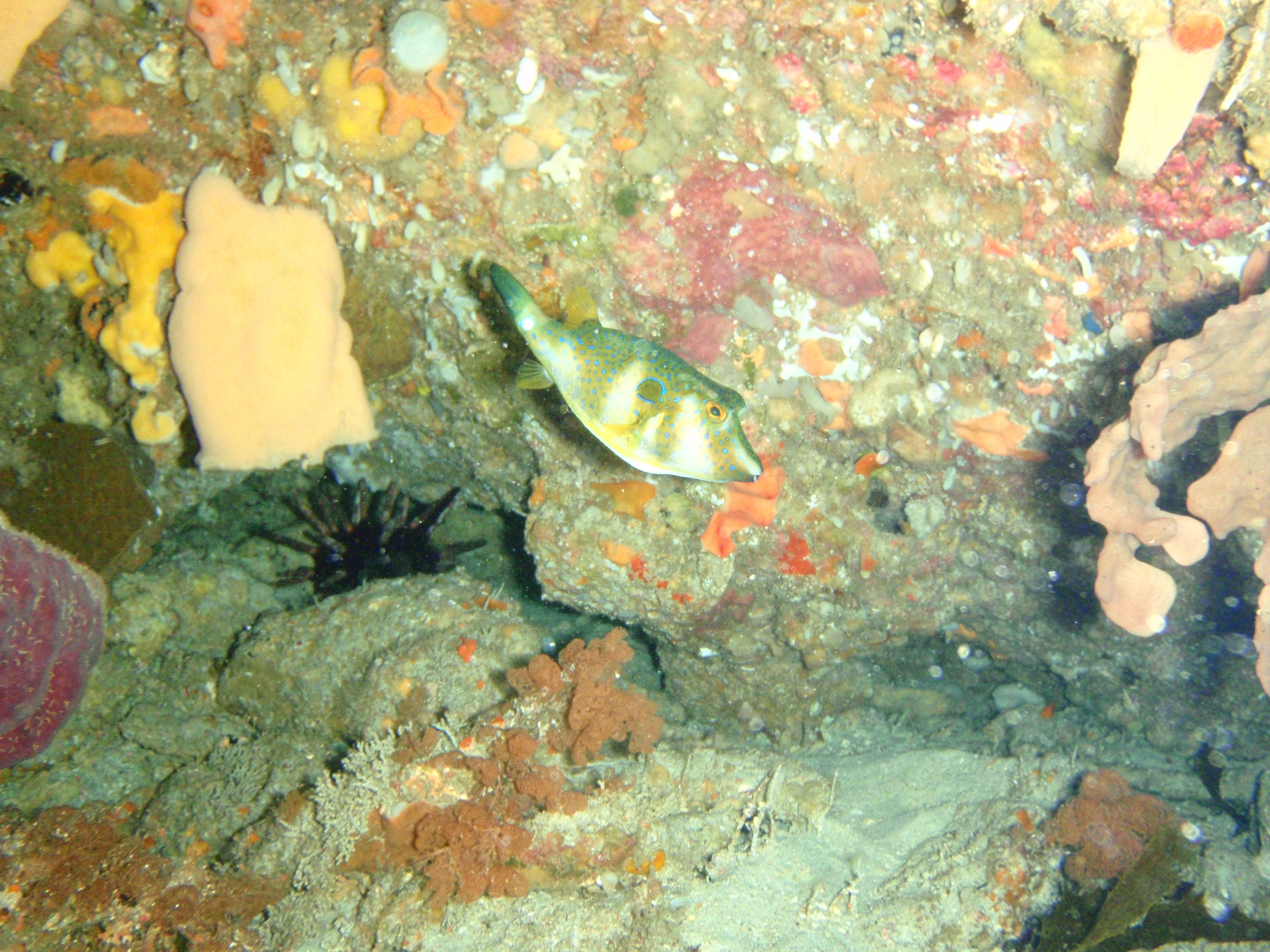
- Omegophora cyanopunctata (Bluespotted toadfish)

Scientific classification
- Domain: Eukaryota
- Kingdom: Animalia
- Phylum: Chordata
- Class: Actinopterygii
- Order: Tetraodontiformes
- Family: Tetraodontidae
- Genus: Omegophora; Whitley, 1934

= Omegophora =

Genus of fishes

Omegophora is a genus of pufferfishes native to the coastal waters of Australia.

== Species ==
There are currently two recognized species in this genus:

- Omegophora armilla (Waite & McCulloch, 1915) (Ringed toadfish)
- Omegophora cyanopunctata (Hardy & Hutchins, 1981) (Bluespotted toadfish)
