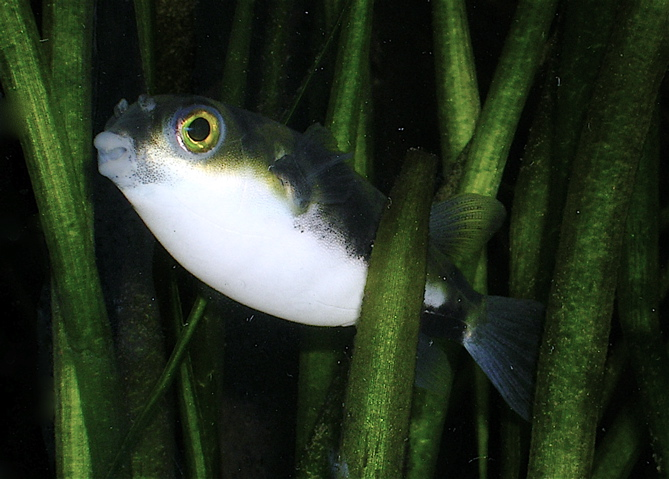
- South American freshwater puffer (Colomesus asellus)

Scientific classification
- Domain: Eukaryota
- Kingdom: Animalia
- Phylum: Chordata
- Class: Actinopterygii
- Order: Tetraodontiformes
- Family: Tetraodontidae
- Genus: Colomesus; T. N. Gill, 1884

Species
- See the text

= Colomesus =

Genus of fishes

Colomesus is a genus of pufferfishes confined to tropical South America. Apart from differences in size, the three species are superficially similar, being green above, white below, and patterned with black transverse bands across the dorsal surface. C. asellus is commonly found in the aquarium trade, while C. psittacus, due to its size and more specialized requirements, is not found as often.

== Species ==
There are currently three recognized species in this genus according to FishBase which the Catalog of Fishes allocates to Sphoeroides.

- Colomesus asellus (J. P. Müller & Troschel, 1849) (Amazon puffer)
- Colomesus psittacus (Bloch & J. G. Schneider, 1801) (Banded puffer)
- Colomesus tocantinensis Amaral, Brito, Silva & Carvalho, 2013
