= Marilyna darwinii =

Scientific classification
- Kingdom: Animalia
- Phylum: Chordata
- Class: Actinopterygii
- Division: Teleostei
- Order: Tetraodontiformes
- Family: Tetraodontidae
- Genus: Marilyna
- Species: M. darwinii

Binomial name
- Marilyna darwinii (Castelnau, 1873)

Synonyms
- Tetraodon darwinii; Tetraodon fasciatus; Tetrodon darwinii; Tetrodon fasciatus

Species of pufferfish

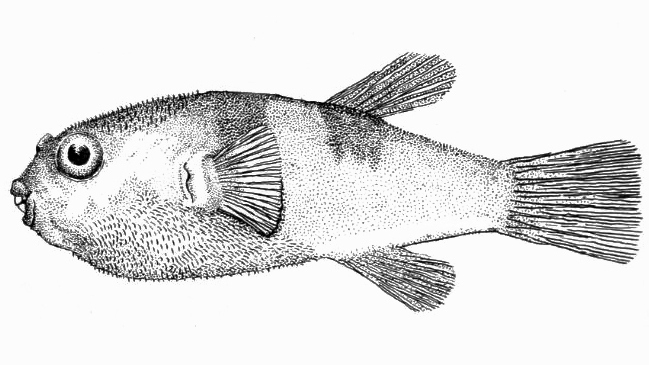
Marilyna darwinii

Marilyna darwinii, known as the Darwin toadfish, is a species of pufferfish in the family Tetraodontidae. It is native to the Western Pacific, where it is known from Papua New Guinea and reported from Australia. It inhabits tropical marine and brackish waters and reaches 9.5 cm (3.7 inches) SL.
