= M. darwini =

M. darwini may refer to:

- Mallada darwini
- Masoniella darwini
- Megalomus darwini
- Mesocyclops darwini, a copepod crustacean species in the genus Mesocyclops
- Microdontomerus darwini
- Minihippus darwini
- Mycale darwini
- Myllocerus darwini
- Mylodon darwini, an extinct giant ground sloth species
- Mysteria darwini

== See also ==
- M. darwinii (disambiguation)
- Darwini (disambiguation)
