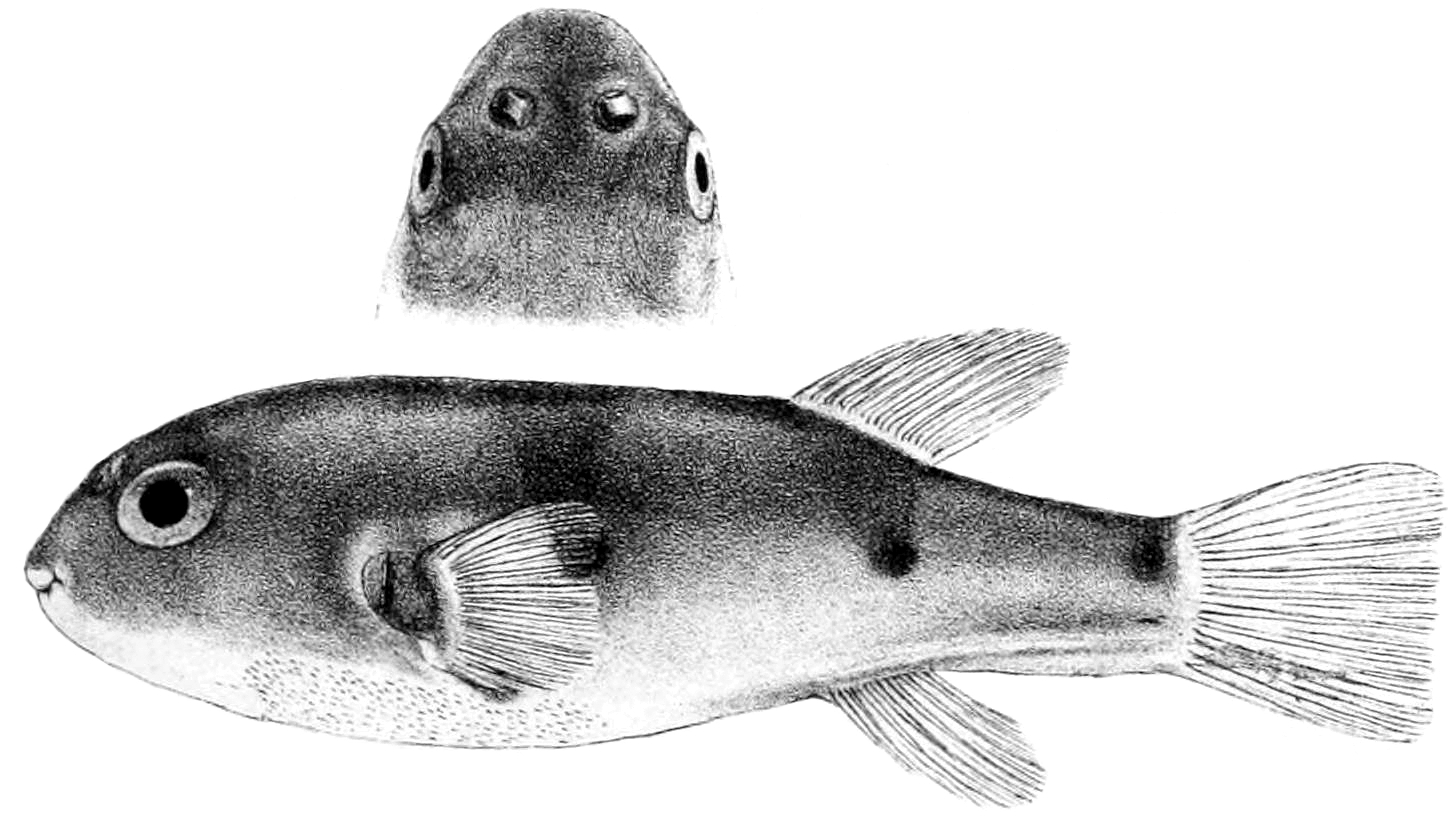
- (M. pleurosticta)

Scientific classification
- Kingdom: Animalia
- Phylum: Chordata
- Class: Actinopterygii
- Order: Tetraodontiformes
- Family: Tetraodontidae
- Subfamily: Tetraodontinae
- Genus: Marilyna; Hardy, 1982

= Marilyna =

Genus of fishes

Marilyna is a genus of pufferfishes native to the western Pacific Ocean.

== Species ==
There are currently three recognized species in this genus:

- Marilyna darwinii (Castelnau, 1873) (Darwin toadfish)
- Marilyna meraukensis (de Beaufort, 1955) (Merauke toadfish)
- Marilyna pleurosticta (Günther, 1872) (Banded toadfish)
