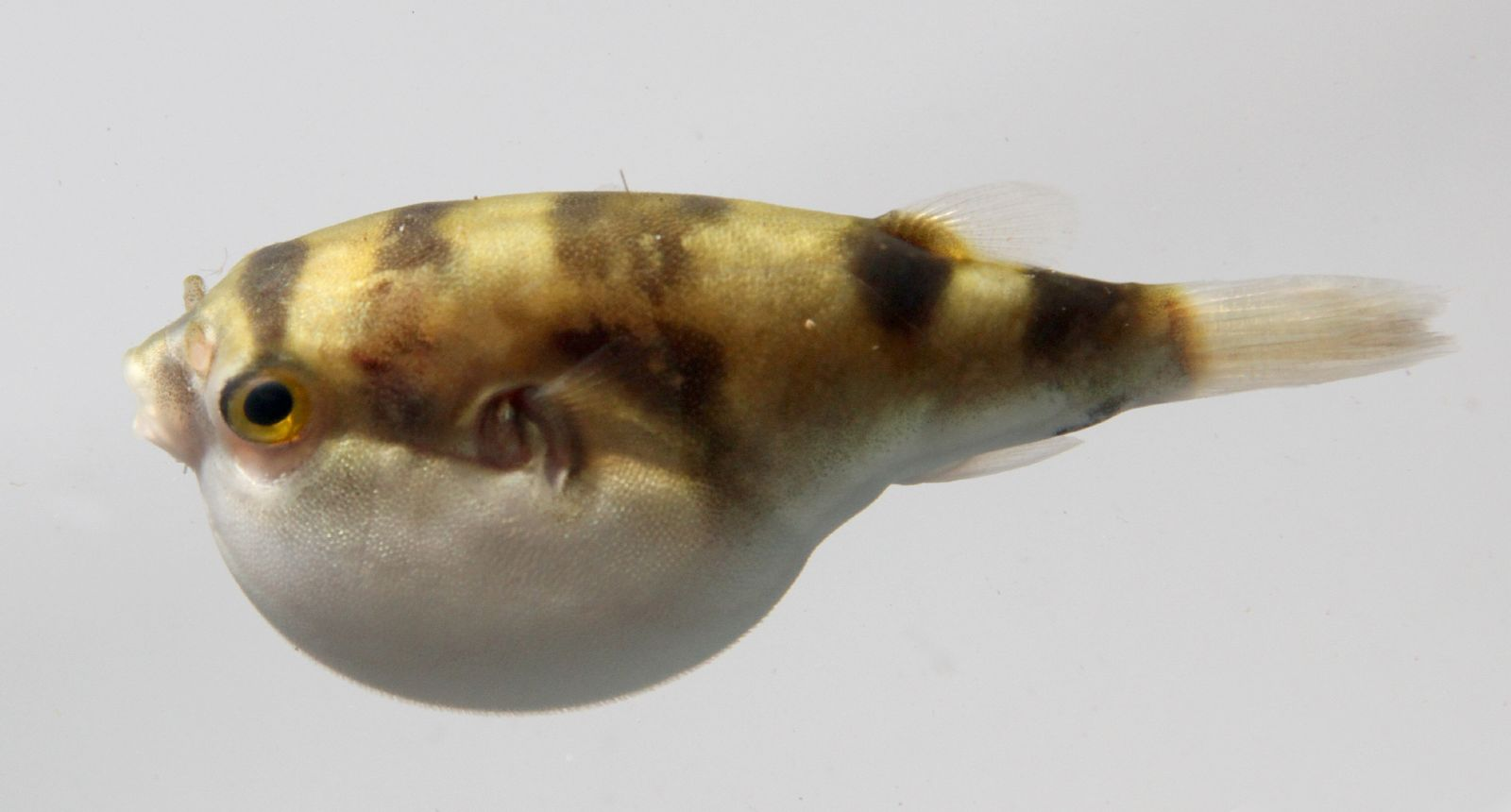

Conservation status
- Least Concern (IUCN 3.1)

Scientific classification
- Kingdom: Animalia
- Phylum: Chordata
- Class: Actinopterygii
- Order: Tetraodontiformes
- Family: Tetraodontidae
- Genus: Colomesus
- Species: C. psittacus

Binomial name
- Colomesus psittacus (Bloch & J. G. Schneider, 1801)

= Colomesus psittacus =

Species of fish

Colomesus psittacus, the Banded puffer, parrot puffer or South American estuarine puffer, is a species of pufferfish found all along the Western Atlantic coastline of South America from the Gulf of Paria down to the mouth of the Amazon River in Brazil.

== Description ==
The coloration of this fish is green above, white below, and patterned with black transverse bands across the dorsal surface. Compared with Colomesus asellus, the black bands on the back are much thinner, and it also lacks a distinctive black band that rings the base of the caudal fin. This species grows to a length of 28.9 centimetres (11.4 in) SL. This species is known to have edible flesh but a toxic liver but whether it contains saxitoxin or tetrodotoxin (as is the case with many marine puffers) is not known.

== Ecology ==
It is a euryhaline species that moves freely between freshwater and the sea. The natural diet of Colomesus psittacus is carnivorous and consists mainly of molluscs. In the aquarium they eat a variety of invertebrates including snails, clams and shrimps. Like other pufferfish, they have the ability to inflate themselves when threatened, making themselves much larger and therefore more difficult for predators to handle or swallow.

== Aquarium keeping ==
Because of its large size and need for salt water, Colomesus psittacus is rarely kept in home aquaria, but it is otherwise similar to Colomesus asellus in terms of maintenance. It is not a schooling species and may be aggressive towards others of its species, so is usually kept alone.
