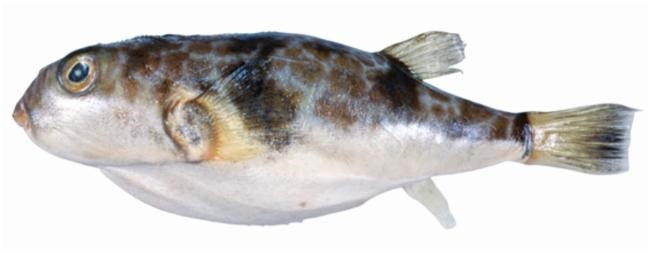

Conservation status
- Least Concern (IUCN 3.1)

Scientific classification
- Kingdom: Animalia
- Phylum: Chordata
- Class: Actinopterygii
- Division: Teleostei
- Order: Tetraodontiformes
- Family: Tetraodontidae
- Genus: Reicheltia; Hardy, 1982
- Species: R. halsteadi

Binomial name
- Reicheltia halsteadi (Whitley, 1957)

= Reicheltia =

Species of fish

Reicheltia halsteadi, Halstead's toadfish, is a species of pufferfish endemic to Australia. This species grows to a length of 16 centimetres (6.3 in) TL. This species is the only known member of the genus Reicheltia.

== Description ==
The Halstead's toadfish is a species representing a monotypic genus of tetraodontid fishes. The most obvious characteristic of the Halstead's toadfish is an elongated body that is rounded dorsally. The body is also flattened ventrally, tapering to a narrow caudal peduncle. It has a small terminal mouth with no chin and triturating teeth are absent. The top of pectoral fin base is below the lower margin of eye and the pectoral fin margins are rounded. The Nasal organ has two small, almost equally sized openings. The eyes are round, moderate in size and the rim is completely adnate. The lips are moderately thick and covered with numerous short papillae. The prefrontals are moderately large, rounded, each with a small olfactory nerve foramen; frontals wide over orbit; sphenotic not contacting supraoccipital. The spines are restricted to the nape and belly.

The color of the body varies, the ground color of dorsum is pale yellowish green with many irregular light browns or reddish-brown blotches. Dark brown bands cross the dorsum at the eyes, between the eyes and pectoral fin base, just behind the pectoral fin base and are extending down side at dorsal fin base, and at the caudal fin base. Brownish blotches and yellow green background continue to mid-lateral region of the fish and are replaced by small silverfish-grey flecks which gradually merges into the white belly. The cheeks and lower lateral surfaces have a silverfish-grey sheen. Spinose region of the belly is white. All fins are pale, and a reddish-brown patch is seen on anterior of pectoral fin insert.

== Distribution and habitat ==
Halstead's toadfish is distributed in the southwestern Pacific, from Queensland to New South Wales, Australia. It is found at depths ranging from 1 to 80 metres (3 ft 3 in to 262 ft 6 in).

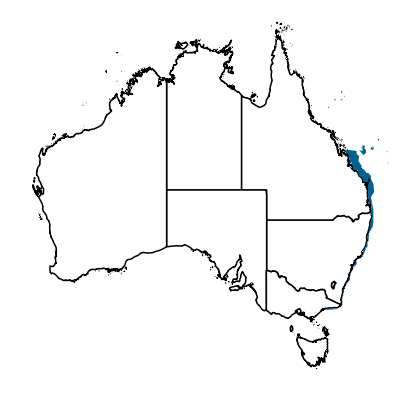
Halstead's toadfish range

Reicheltia halsteadi is demersal marine species. It is typically found on sand just beyond turbulent zone off surf beaches, and can also be found in sheltered bays. Young fishes occur in small schools over sandy bottoms. It does not appear to be overly common throughout its known range.

== Diet ==
The feeding habits of Halstead's toadfish have been little researched in general. However research into similar demersal tetraodontid fishes would suggest that their diet consists mostly of algae and small invertebrates such as crustaceans and mollusks. They can survive on a completely vegetarian diet if their environment is lacking resources, but prefer an omnivorous food selection.

== Toxicity ==
The muscles of Halstead's toadfish contain less than 10 MU/g of tetrodotoxin in its tissue and considered harmless. Many species of pufferfish bear this toxin, obtaining it from tetrodotoxin-containing bacteria in their diet.
