= Polyspina =

Conservation status
- Least Concern (IUCN 3.1)

Scientific classification
- Kingdom: Animalia
- Phylum: Chordata
- Class: Actinopterygii
- Order: Tetraodontiformes
- Family: Tetraodontidae
- Genus: Polyspina; Hardy, 1983
- Species: P. piosae

Binomial name
- Polyspina piosae (Whitley, 1955)

Species of fish

Polyspina piosae, commonly known as the orangebarred puffer, is a species of pufferfish endemic to the coast of western Australia. This species is the only known member of its genus.
