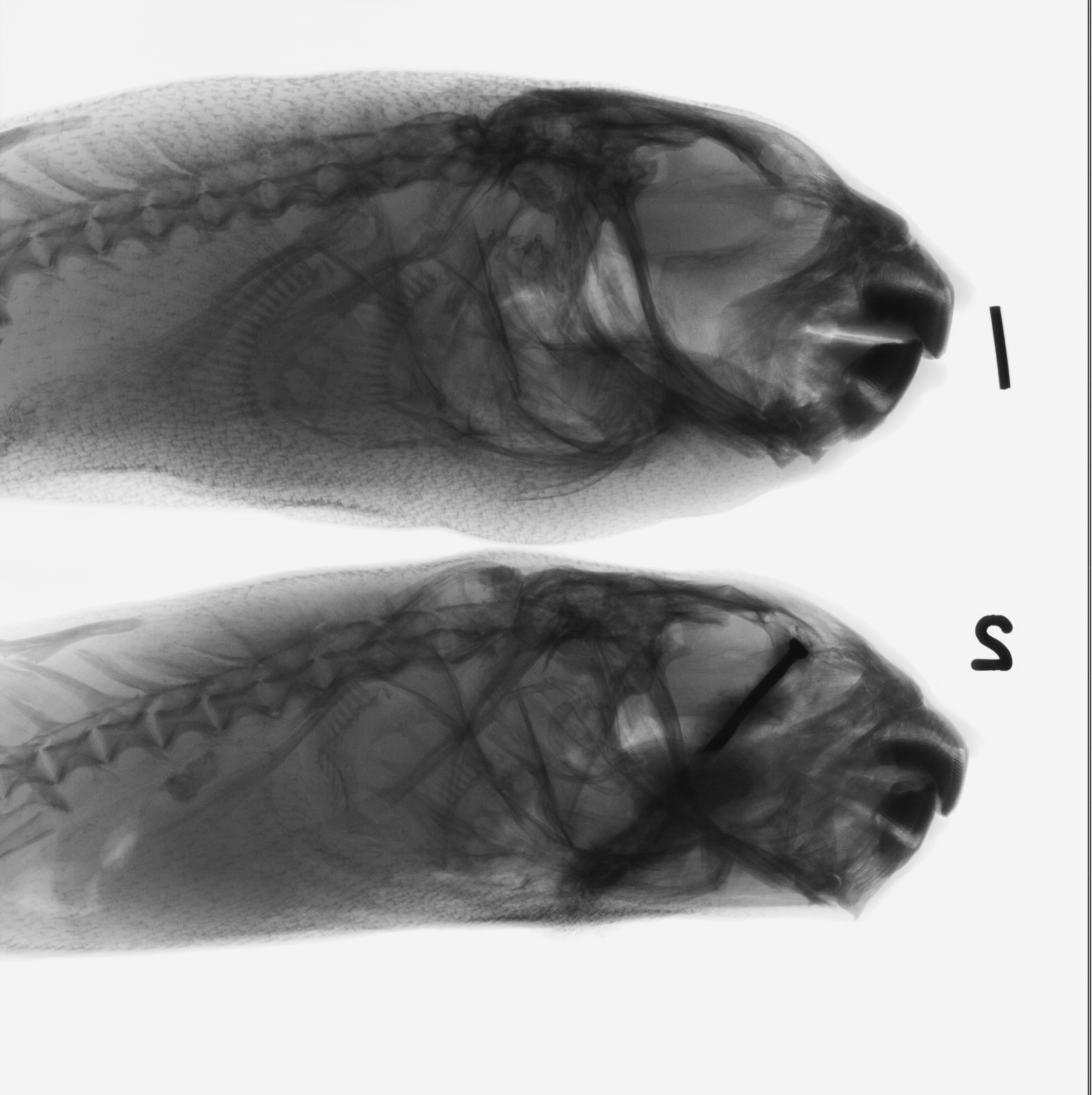
- A radiograph of a spotted puffer's head

Conservation status
- Least Concern (IUCN 3.1)

Scientific classification
- Kingdom: Animalia
- Phylum: Chordata
- Class: Actinopterygii
- Order: Tetraodontiformes
- Family: Tetraodontidae
- Genus: Guentheridia; C. H. Gilbert & Starks, 1904
- Species: G. formosa

Binomial name
- Guentheridia formosa (Günther, 1870)

= Spotted puffer =

Species of fish

Guentheridia formosa, the spotted puffer, is a species of pufferfish native to the coasts of the eastern Pacific Ocean from Costa Rica to Ecuador. This species grows to a length of 26 centimetres (10 in) TL. It is the only known member of the monotypic genus Guentheridia.

Other common names for the fish include compère taché in French and tamborín and tamboril manchado in Spanish.

== Description ==
The spotted puffer has a white body with dense dark spots on its back and sides in various patterns, with variable yellowish markings. Its head is wider than it is deep, and is convex between the eyes. It has a single dorsal fin at its rear, a similar-shaped anal fin below, and in front of the pectoral fin it has a slit-like gill opening. The spotted puffer's tail fin is generally straight, and can be dusky or greenish.

== Habitat ==
Found in coastal shallow water at depths between 0–10 m, generally at the bottom on soft substrate such as mud or sand.
