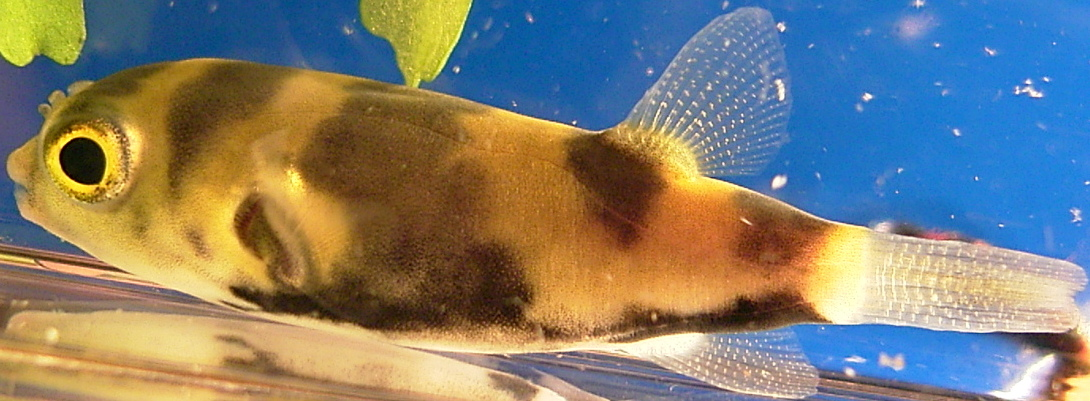

Scientific classification
- Kingdom: Animalia
- Phylum: Chordata
- Class: Actinopterygii
- Order: Tetraodontiformes
- Family: Tetraodontidae
- Genus: Colomesus
- Species: C. asellus

Binomial name
- Colomesus asellus (J. P. Müller & Troschel, 1849)

= Colomesus asellus =

Species of fish

Colomesus asellus, the Amazon puffer, asellus puffer, South American freshwater puffer, Peruvian puffer, or Brazilian puffer is a species of pufferfish confined to the Amazon, Essequibo and Orinoco basins in tropical South America. It is a popular aquarium species.

It has typically been recognized as the only true freshwater pufferfish of South America, but a study in 2013 recommended that the population in the Tocantins River basin (quite similar to C. asellus in appearance, but differs in genetics) should be considered as a separate species, C. tocantinensis. This is followed by Catalog of Fishes, but not FishBase.

== Description ==
The coloration of this fish is green above, white below, and patterned with black transverse bands across the dorsal surface. Compared with Colomesus psittacus, the black bands on the back are much thicker, and it also has a distinctive black band that rings the base of the caudal fin. This species grows to a length of 12.8 centimetres (5.0 in) SL. It is known to contain the toxin saxitoxin, and gonyautoxin such as the GTX 2 and GTX 3.

== Ecology ==
Colomesus asellus is normally only found in freshwater environments although it will tolerate slightly brackish water.

Wild Colomesus asellus are reported to consume benthic crustaceans, fish, planktonic invertebrates, and plants. Aquarium specimens consume various invertebrates including midge larvae and Mysida.

Like other pufferfish, they have the ability to inflate themselves when threatened, making themselves much larger and therefore more difficult for predators to handle or swallow. Colomesus asellus is unusual among freshwater pufferfish for being migratory and non-territorial.

Colomesus asellus is known to breed during the wet season, spawning in rivers, with the numerous small eggs being scattered on the substrate and the larvae drifting downstream. Colomesus asellus is nearly impossible to breed in the aquarium because their eggs are very small and they go through a planktonic phase before growing into "real'' fish.

== In the aquarium ==
Colomesus asellus is fairly widely kept as an aquarium fish. An aquarium tank with volume of at least 109 liters is required ( approx. 29 US gallons). Compared to other freshwater pufferfish, Colomesus asellus is unusual in being tolerant of conspecifics and tends to be nervous when kept singly. It is known to be a fin-nipper and could attack slow moving species such as angelfish, guppies, and Corydoras. Colomesus asellus has some of the fastest growing teeth of the freshwater puffers, so feeding crunchy foods and possibly having to do dentistry are two important factors.
