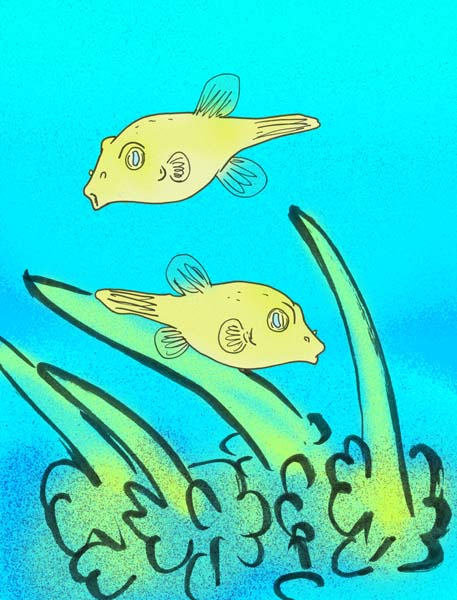
- Reconstruction of E. pygmaeus

Scientific classification
- Kingdom: Animalia
- Phylum: Chordata
- Class: Actinopterygii
- Division: Teleostei
- Order: Tetraodontiformes
- Family: Tetraodontidae
- Genus: †Eotetraodon; Tyler, 1980

Type species
- †Tetraodon pygmaeus de Zigno, 1887

Species
- †E. gornylutshensis Bannikov & Tyler, 2012; †E. pygmaeus (de Zigno, 1887); †E. tavernei Tyler & Bannikov, 2012

= Eotetraodon =

Eotetraodon Temporal range: Late Ypresian to Bartonian

Extinct genus of fishes

Eotetraodon ("dawn Tetraodon") is an extinct genus of miniature prehistoric pufferfish that lived in Europe from the early to mid-late Eocene. It is the earliest pufferfish known from fossil remains.

The following species are known:

- †E. gornylutshensis Bannikov & Tyler, 2008 - mid-late Eocene (Bartonian) of the North Caucasus, Russia (Kuma Formation)
- †E. pygmaeus (de Zigno, 1887) (type species) - early Eocene of Italy (Monte Bolca lagerstatten)
- †E. tavernei Tyler & Bannikov, 2012 - early Eocene of Italy (Monte Bolca lagerstatten)

As the name of the type species suggests, Eotetraodon was a very small fish that (depending on the species) reached only 17.5 to 20.1 millimetres (0.69 to 0.79 in). Despite this very small size, fossil specimens are fully ossified, suggesting that they are of adult individuals.

Although generally considered an early pufferfish, some recent studies have placed it as part of an evolutionary grade, containing several other Bolca tetraodontiforms, leading to the threetooth puffer (Triodon), a different tetraodontiform fish.
