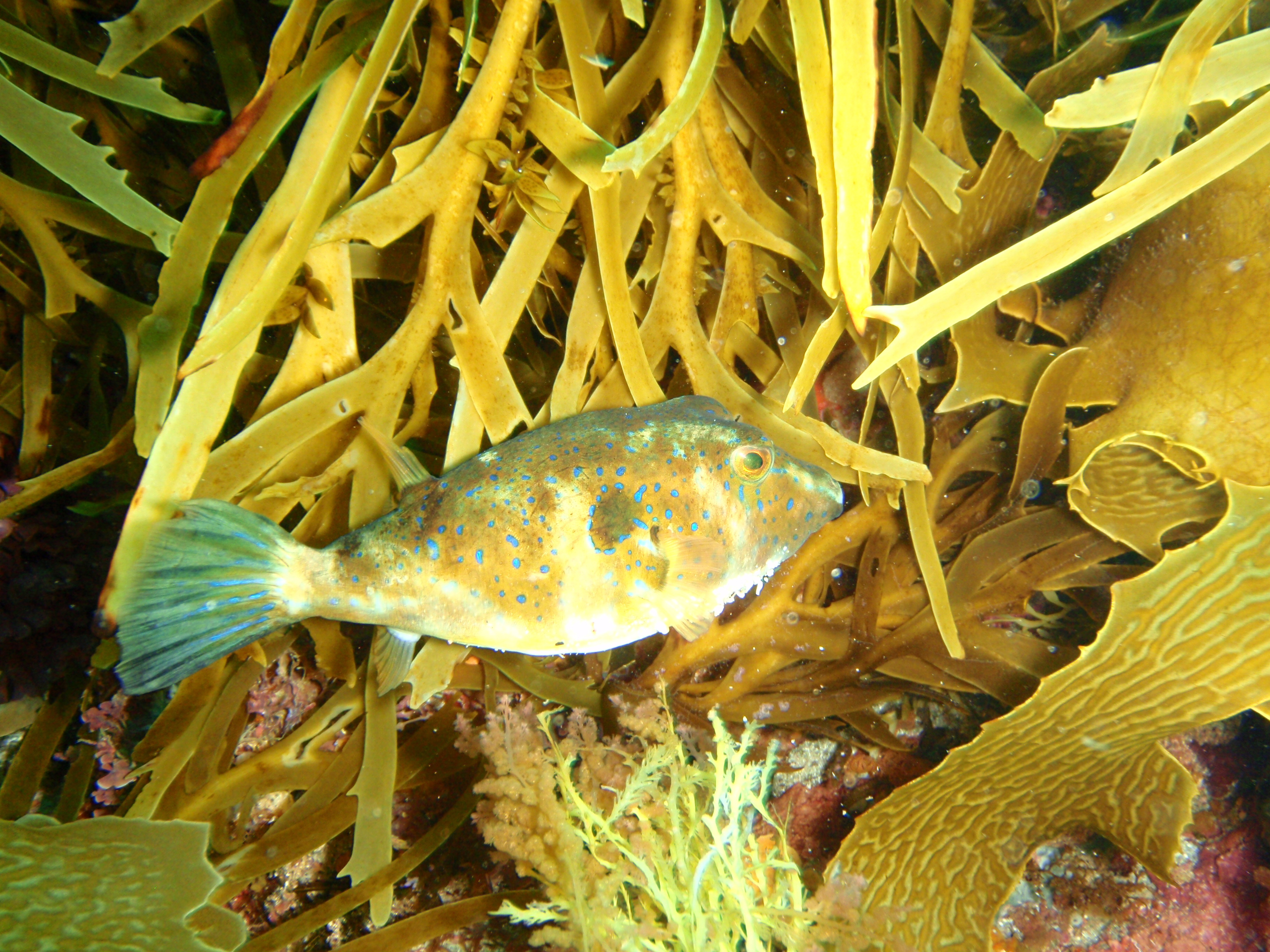

Scientific classification
- Kingdom: Animalia
- Phylum: Chordata
- Class: Actinopterygii
- Order: Tetraodontiformes
- Family: Tetraodontidae
- Genus: Omegophora
- Species: O. cyanopunctata

Binomial name
- Omegophora cyanopunctata Hardy & Hutchins, 1981

= Omegophora cyanopunctata =

Species of pufferfish

Omegophora cyanopunctata, known as the bluespotted toadfish or bluespotted puffer, is a species of pufferfish in the family Tetraodontidae. It is a marine, reef-associated species endemic to Australian waters, where it ranges from Gulf St Vincent to Rottnest Island. The type locality of the species is Canal Rocks. It occurs at a depth range of 1 to 25 m (3 to 82 ft) and reaches 18 cm (7 inches) in total length.
