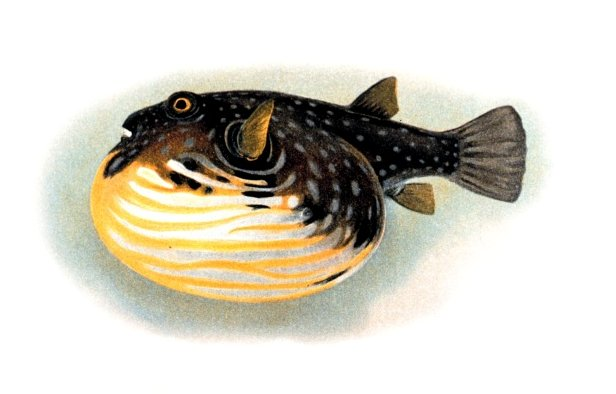
- Inflated white-spotted puffer

Scientific classification
- Kingdom: Animalia
- Phylum: Chordata
- Class: Actinopterygii
- Division: Teleostei
- Order: Tetraodontiformes
- Suborder: Tetraodontoidei
- Family: Tetraodontidae; Bonaparte, 1832

Type species
- Tetraodon lineatus Linnaeus, 1758

Genera
- See text

= Tetraodontidae =

Puffers Temporal range: Early Eocene to present

Family of pufferfish

Tetraodontidae is a family of marine and freshwater fish in the order Tetraodontiformes. The family includes many familiar species variously called pufferfishes, puffers, balloonfishes, blowfishes, blowers, blowies, bubblefishes, globefishes, swellfishes, toadfishes, toadies, botetes, toadle, honey toads, sugar toads, and sea squabs. They are morphologically similar to the closely related porcupinefish, which have large external spines (unlike the thinner, hidden spines of the Tetraodontidae, which are only visible when the fish have puffed up). The family name comes from Ancient Greek τετρα- (tetra-), meaning "four", and ὀδούς (odoús), meaning "tooth", referring to the four teeth of the type genus Tetraodon.

The majority of pufferfish species are toxic, with some among the most poisonous vertebrates in the world. In certain species, the internal organs, such as the liver, and sometimes the skin, contain mucus tetrodotoxin, and are highly toxic to most animals when eaten; nevertheless, the meat of some species is considered a delicacy in Japan (as 河豚, fugu), Korea (as 복, bok, or 복어, bogeo), and China (as 河豚, hétún) when prepared by specially trained chefs who know which part is safe to eat and in what quantity. Other pufferfish species with nontoxic flesh, such as the northern puffer, Sphoeroides maculatus, of the Chesapeake Bay, are considered a delicacy elsewhere.

== Morphology ==
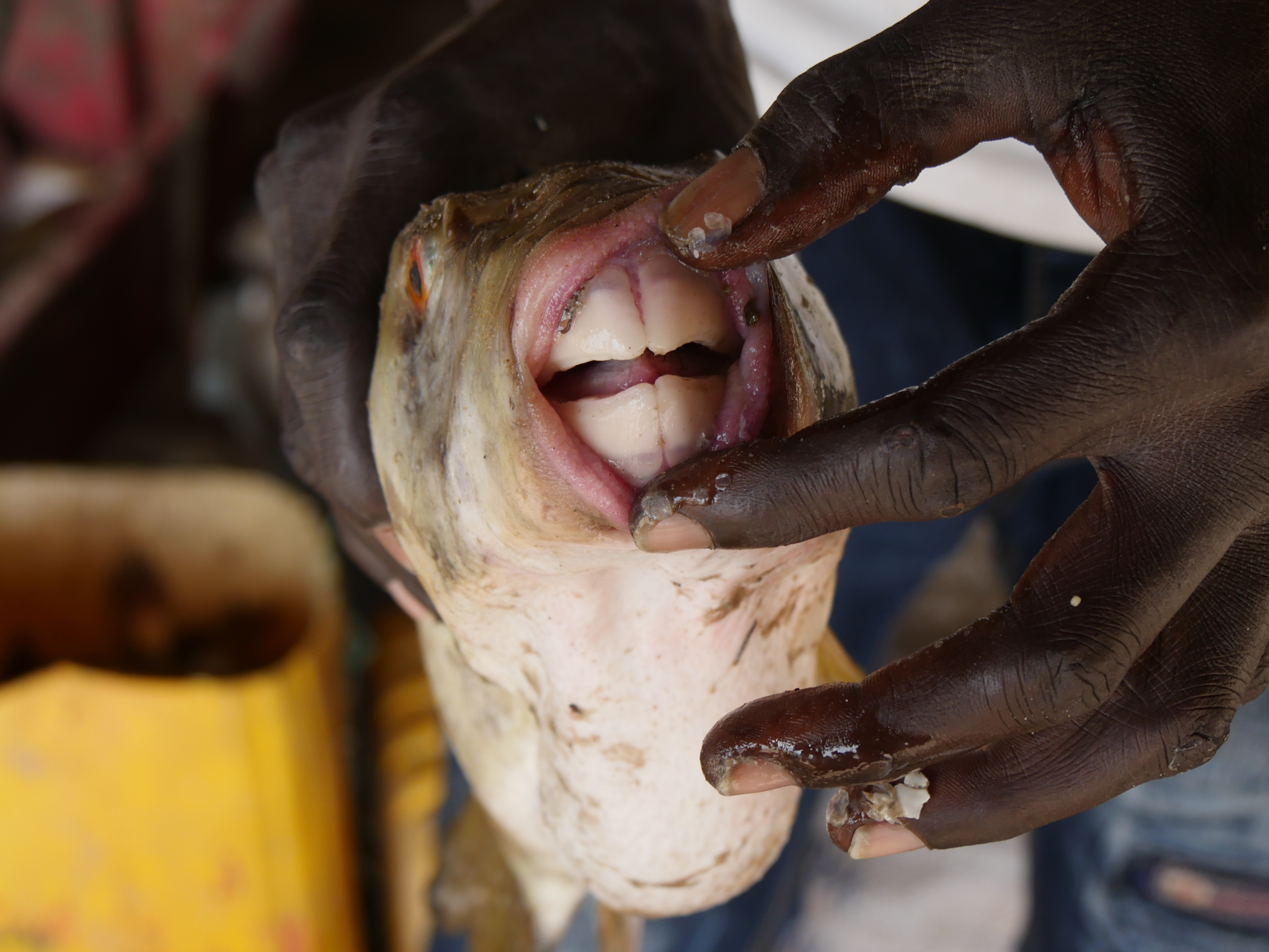
Prickly puffer (Ephippion guttifer) showing the four teeth eponymous of the family Tetraodontidae

Pufferfish are typically small to medium in size, although a few species such as the Mbu pufferfish can reach lengths greater than 50 cm (20 in).

Tetraodontiformes, or pufferfish, are most significantly characterized by their four beak-like teeth – hence the name combining the Greek terms "tetra" for four and "odous" for tooth. Each of the top and bottom arches is fused together with a visible midsagittal demarcation, which are used to break apart and consume small crustaceans. The lack of ribs, a pelvis, and pelvic fins are also unique to pufferfish. The notably missing bone and fin features are due to the pufferfish's specialized defense mechanism, expanding by sucking in water through an oral cavity.

Pufferfish can also have many varied structures of caltrop-like dermal spines, which account for the replacement of typical fish scales, and can range in coverage extent from the entire body, to leaving the frontal surface empty. Tetraodontidae typically have smaller spines than the sister family Diodontidae, with some spines not being visible until inflation.

== Taxonomy ==
The Tetraodontidae contains 193 to 206 species of puffers in 27 or 28 genera:

- Amblyrhynchotes Troschel, 1856
- Arothron Müller, 1841
- Auriglobus Kottelat, 1999
- Canthigaster Swainson, 1839
- Carinotetraodon Benl, 1957
- Chelonodon Müller, 1841
- Chonerhinos Bleeker, 1854
- Colomesus Gill, 1884
- Contusus Whitley, 1947
- Dichotomyctere Duméril, 1855
- Ephippion Bibron, 1855
- Feroxodon Su, Hardy et Tyler, 1986
- Guentheridia Gilbert et Starks, 1904
- Javichthys Hardy, 1985
- Leiodon Swainson, 1839
- Lagocephalus Swainson, 1839
- Marilyna Hardy, 1982
- Omegophora Whitley, 1934
- Pelagocephalus Tyler & Paxton, 1979
- Polyspina Hardy, 1983
- Pao Kottelat, 2013
- Reicheltia Hardy, 1982
- Sphoeroides Anonymous, 1798
- Takifugu Abe, 1949
- Tetractenos Hardy, 1983
- Tetraodon Linnaeus, 1758
- Torquigener Whitley, 1930
- Tylerius Hardy, 1984
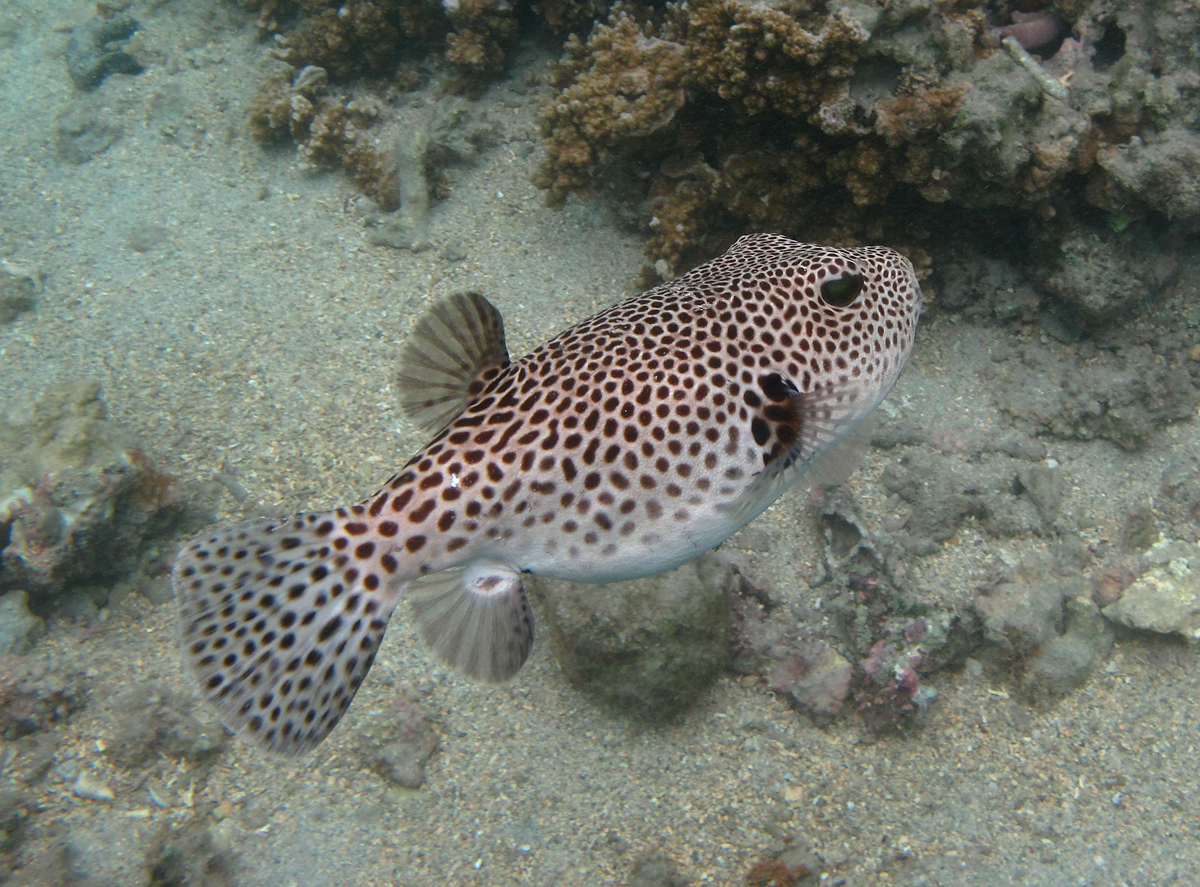
Arothron stellatus

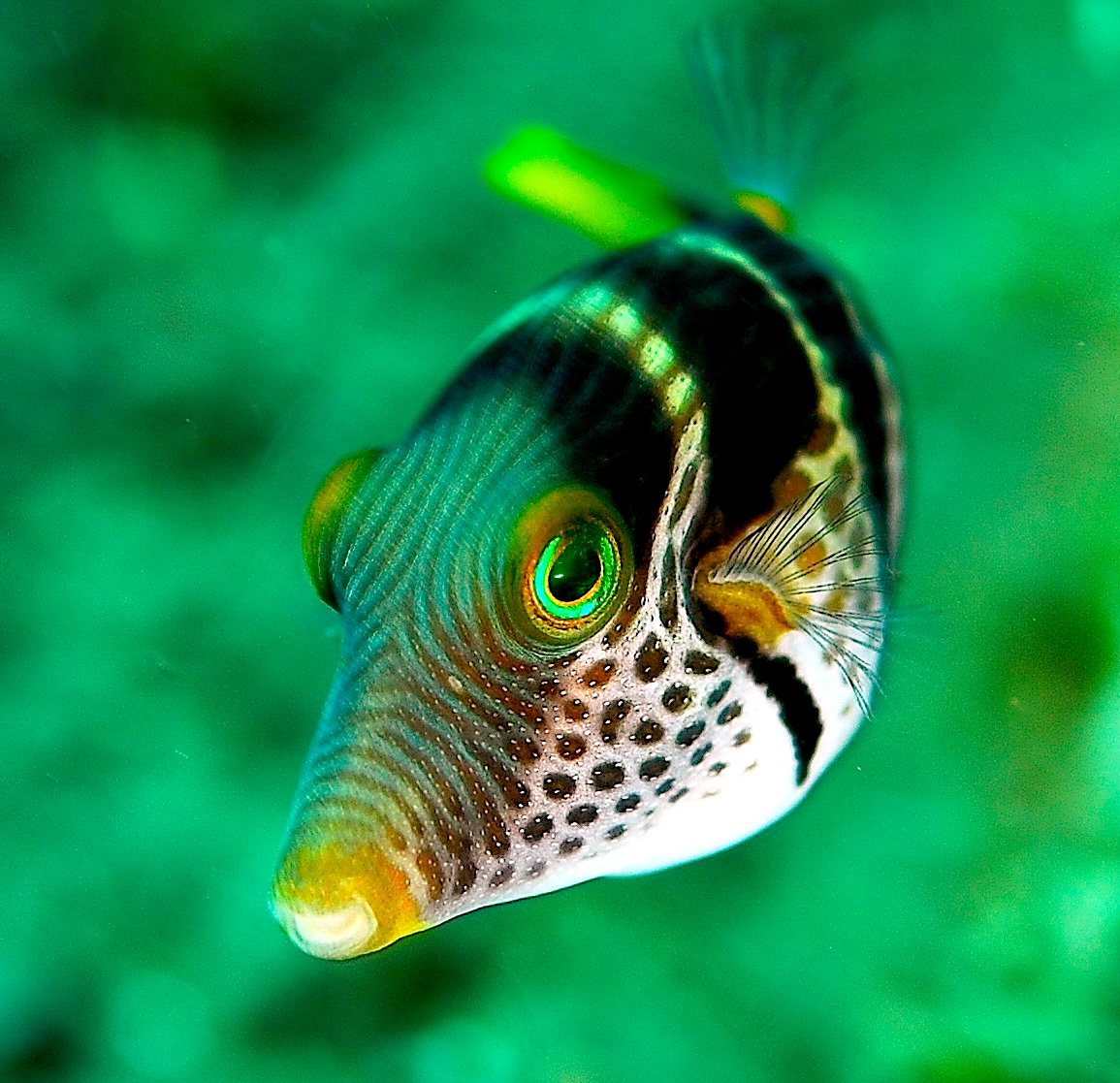
Canthigaster valentini

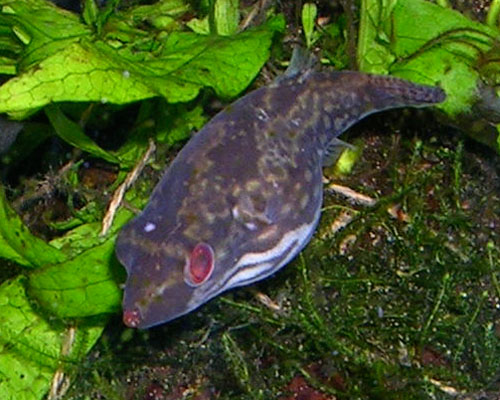
Carinotetraodon irrubesco

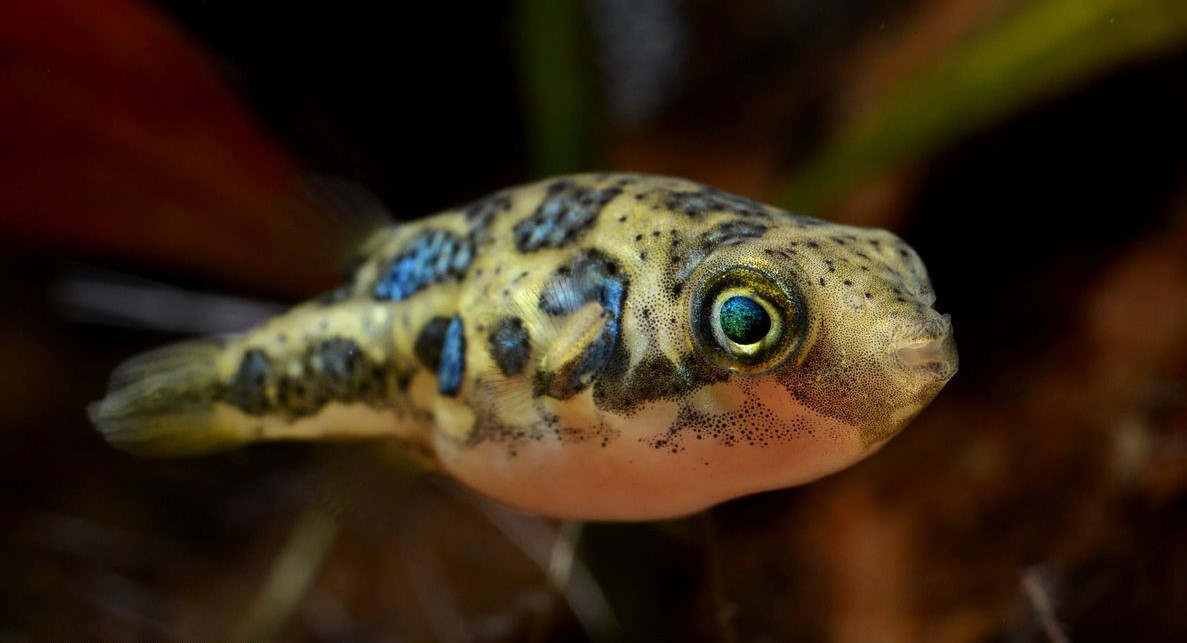
Carinotetraodon travancoricus

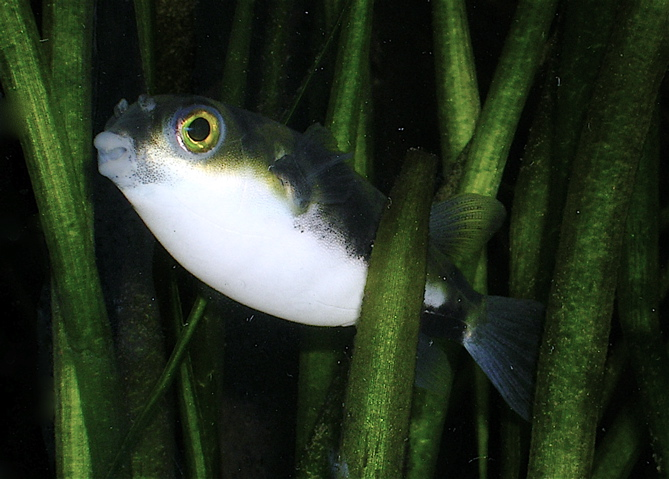
Colomesus asellus

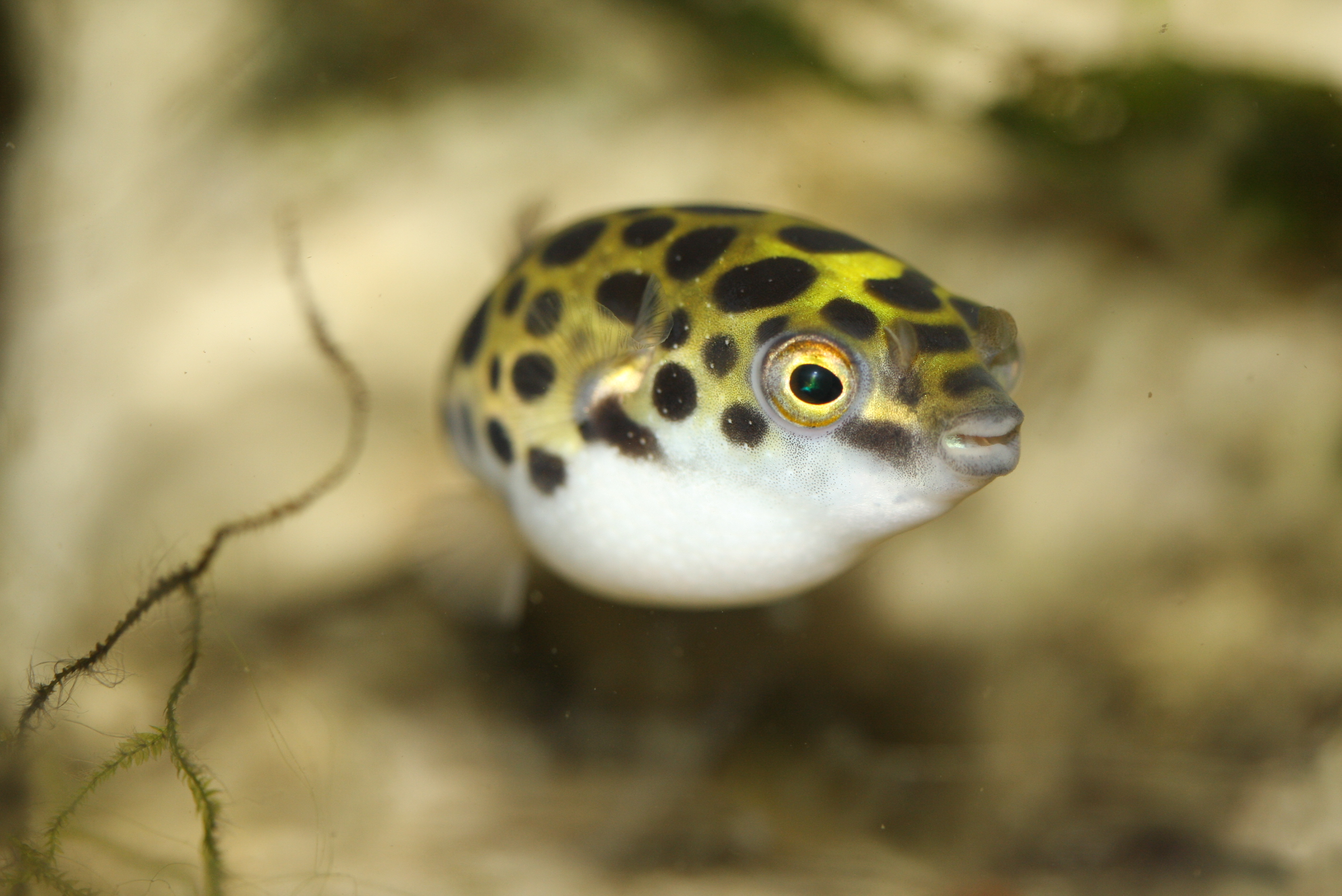
Dichotomyctere nigroviridis

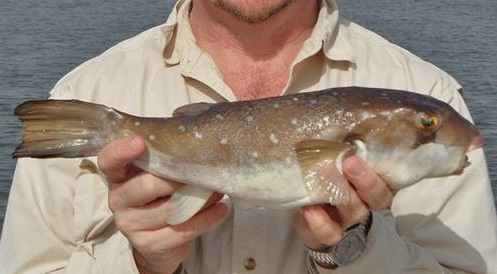
Ephippion guttifer

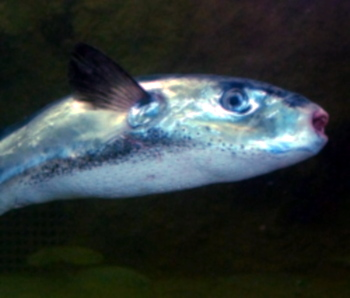
Lagocephalus lagocephalus

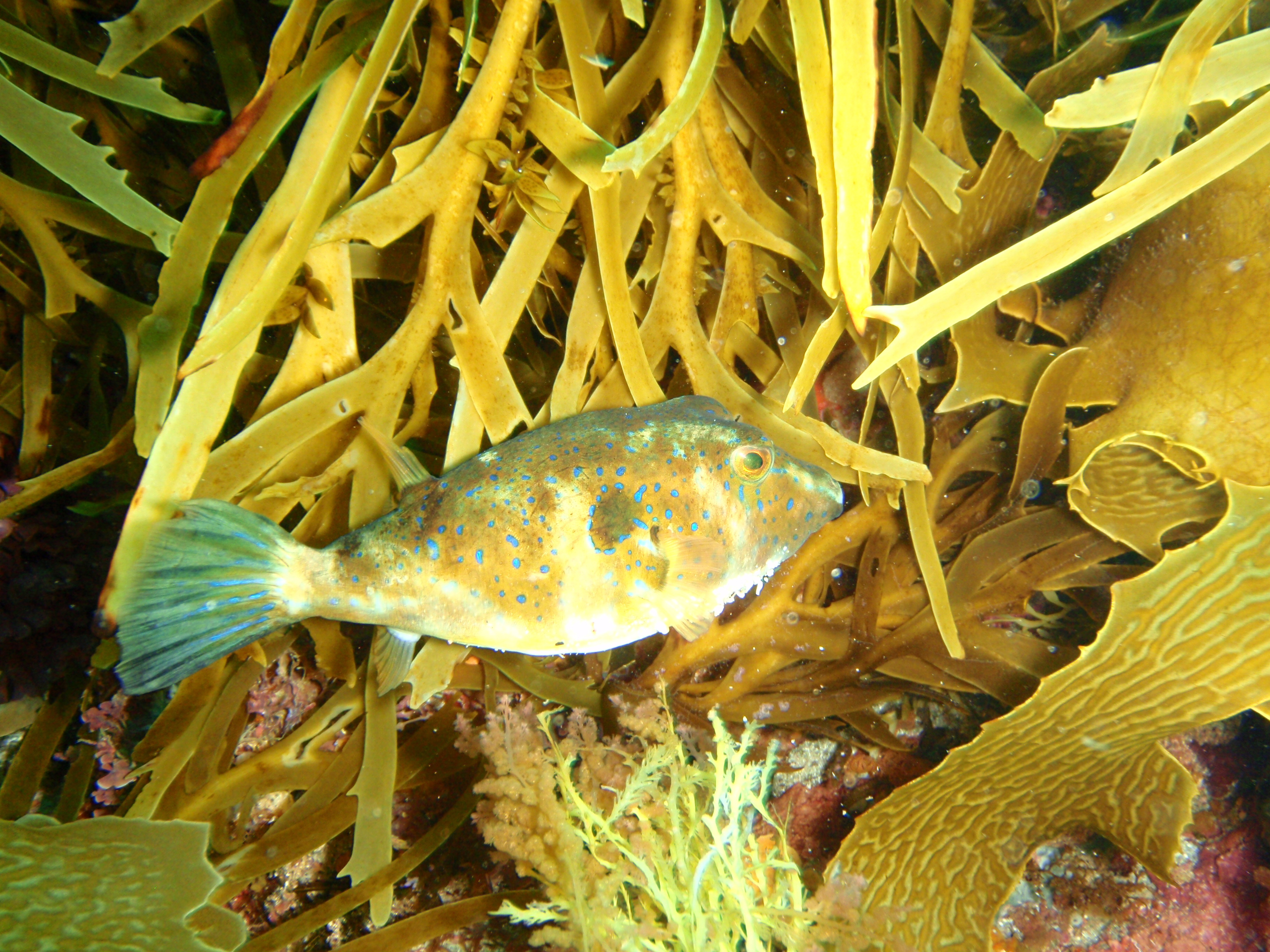
Omegophora cyanopunctata

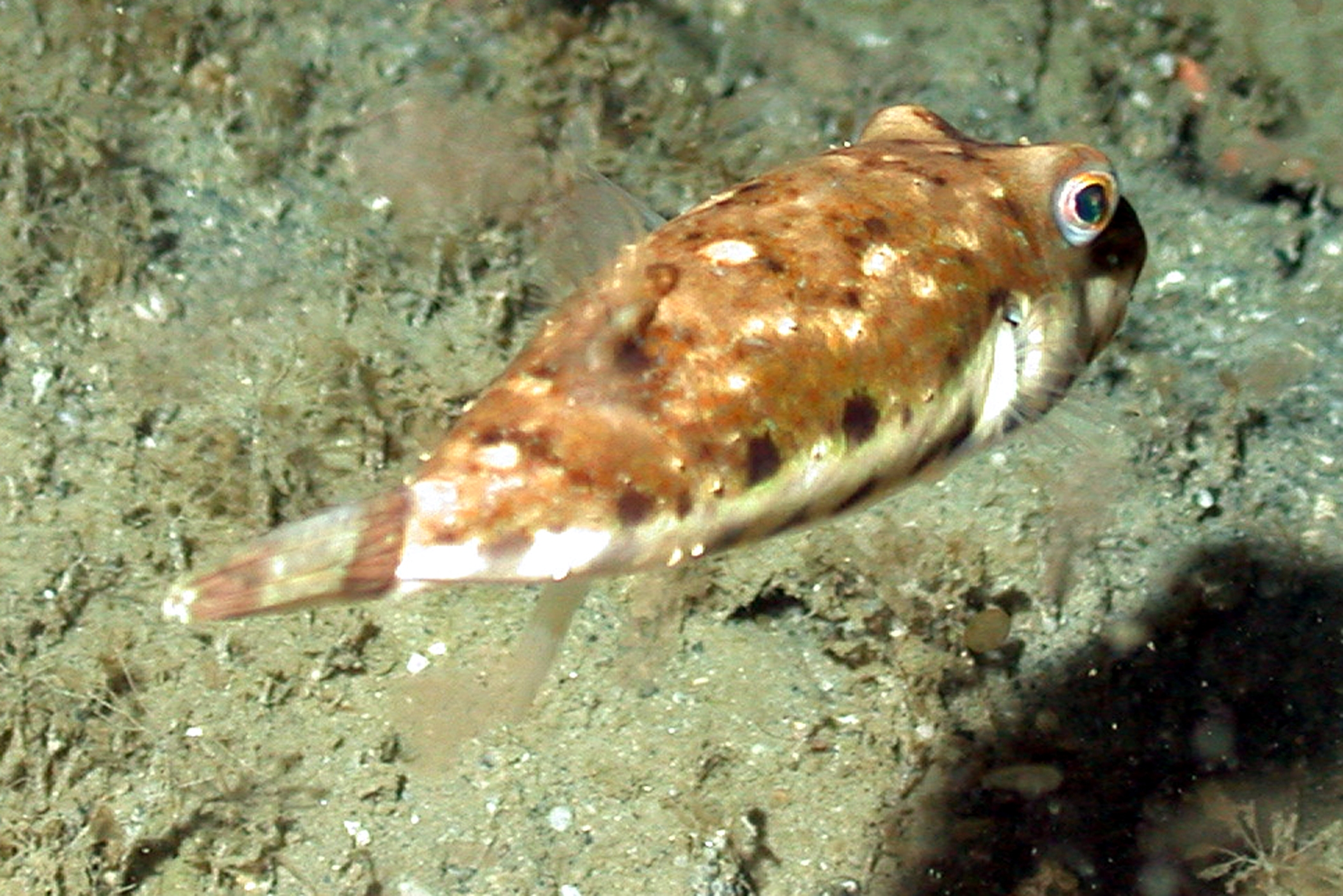
Sphoeroides spengleri

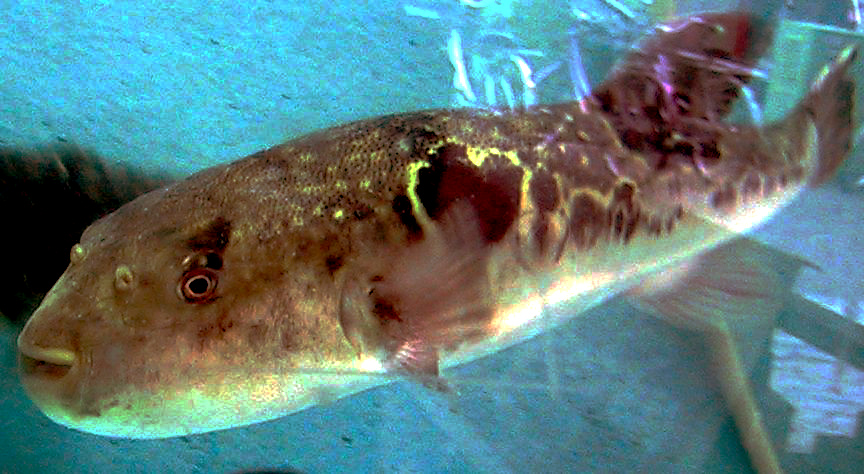
Takifugu rubripes

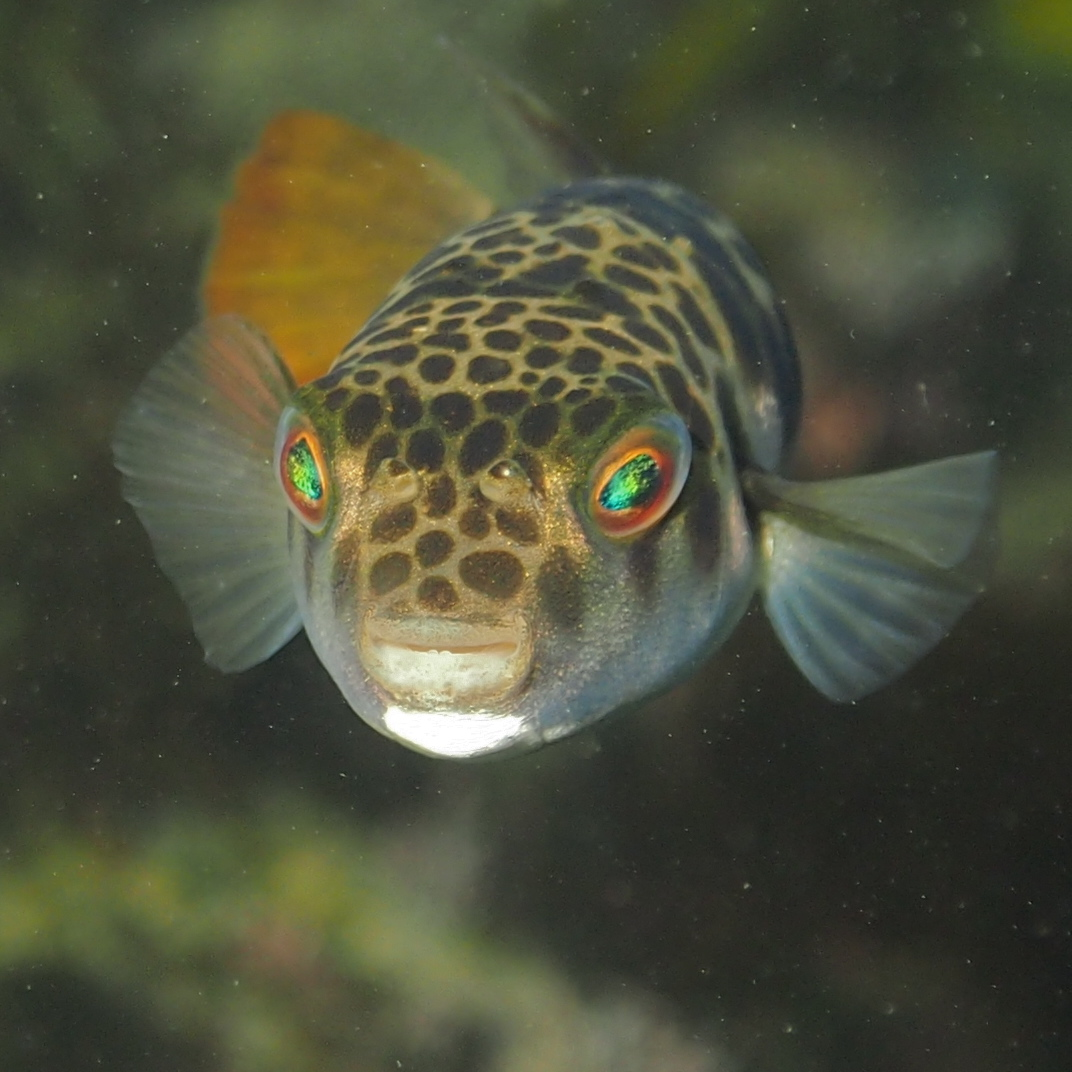
Tetractenos glaber

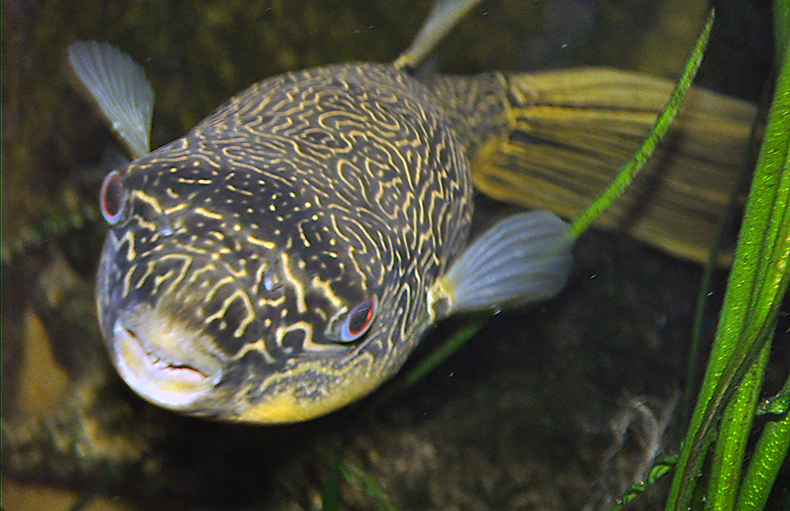
Tetraodon mbu

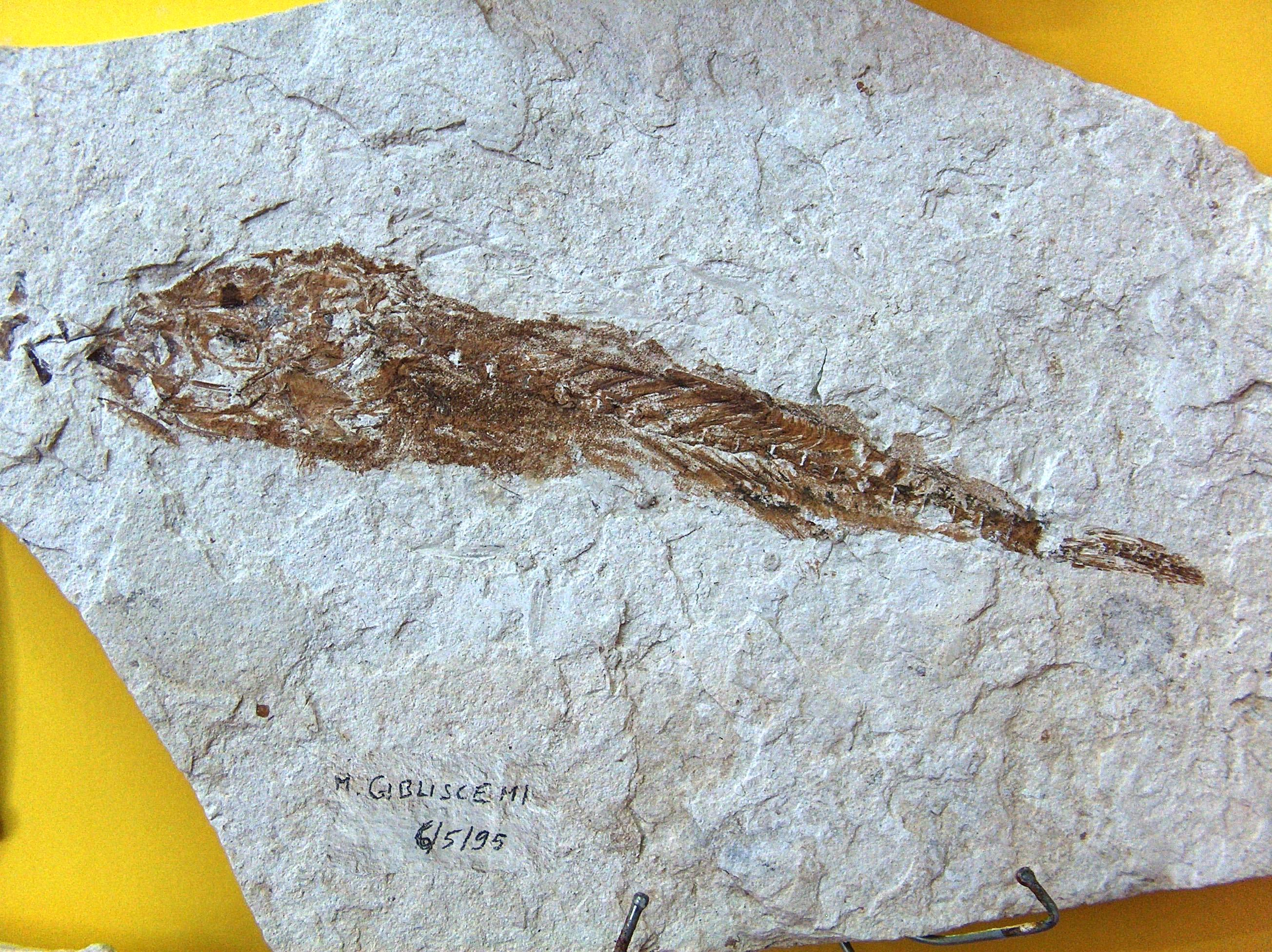
Archaeotetraodon, a Miocene-aged fossil pufferfish from Italy

In addition, the following fossil genera are known:

- †Archaeotetraodon Carnevale & Santini, 2006
- †Eotetraodon Tyler, 1980
- †Leithaodon Carnevale & Tyler, 2015

== Evolution ==
The tetraodontids have been estimated to have diverged from diodontids between 89 and 138 million years ago. The four major clades diverged during the Cretaceous between 80 and 101 million years ago. The oldest known pufferfish genus is Eotetraodon, from the Lutetian epoch of Middle Eocene Europe, with fossils found in Monte Bolca and the Caucasus Mountains. The Monte Bolca species, E. pygmaeus, coexisted with several other tetraodontiforms, including an extinct species of diodontid, primitive boxfish (Proaracana and Eolactoria), and other, totally extinct forms, such as Zignoichthys and the spinacanthids. The extinct genus, Archaeotetraodon is known from Miocene-aged fossils from Europe.

The following cladogram is based on a 2013 analysis of Tetraodontid mitogenomes:

- Triodon
- - - Mola
    - Ranzania
  - - - Chilomycterus
      - Diodon
    - Tetraodontidae
      - Lagocephalus
      - - Sphoeroides
        - - - Marilyna
            - - Tetractenos
              - - Tylerius
                - - - Torquigener pleurogramma
                    - Polyspina piosae
                  - - - Torquigener hypselogeneion
                      - Torquigener brevipinnis
                    - Takifugu
          - - Auriglobus
            - - Leiodon
              - - Carinotetraodon
                - Pao
            - - - - Pelagocephalus
                  - Canthigaster
                - Dichotomyctere
              - - - Omegophora
                  - Arothron
                - - Chelonodon
                  - Tetraodon

== Distribution ==
They are most diverse in the tropical zone, relatively uncommon in the temperate zone, and completely absent from cold waters.

== Ecology and life history ==
Most pufferfish species live in marine or brackish waters, but several tropical genera, comprising about 35 species, spend their entire lifecycles in fresh water. These freshwater species are found in disjunct tropical regions of South America (Colomesus asellus and Colomesus tocantinensis), Africa (six Tetraodon species), and Southeast Asia (Auriglobus, Carinotetraodon, Dichotomyctere, Leiodon and Pao).

Pufferfish diets can vary depending on their environment. Typically, their diet consists mostly of algae and small invertebrates. They can survive on a completely vegetarian diet if their environment is lacking resources, but prefer an omnivorous food selection. Larger species of pufferfish are able to use their beak-like front teeth to break open clams, mussels, and other shellfish. Some species of pufferfish have also been known to enact various hunting techniques ranging from ambush to open-water hunting.

=== Defenses ===
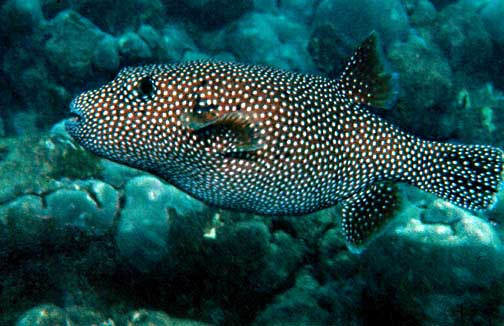
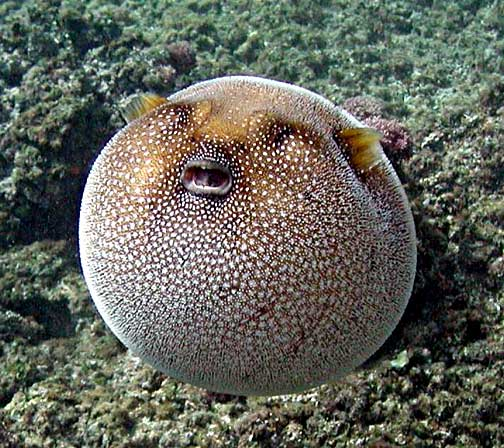
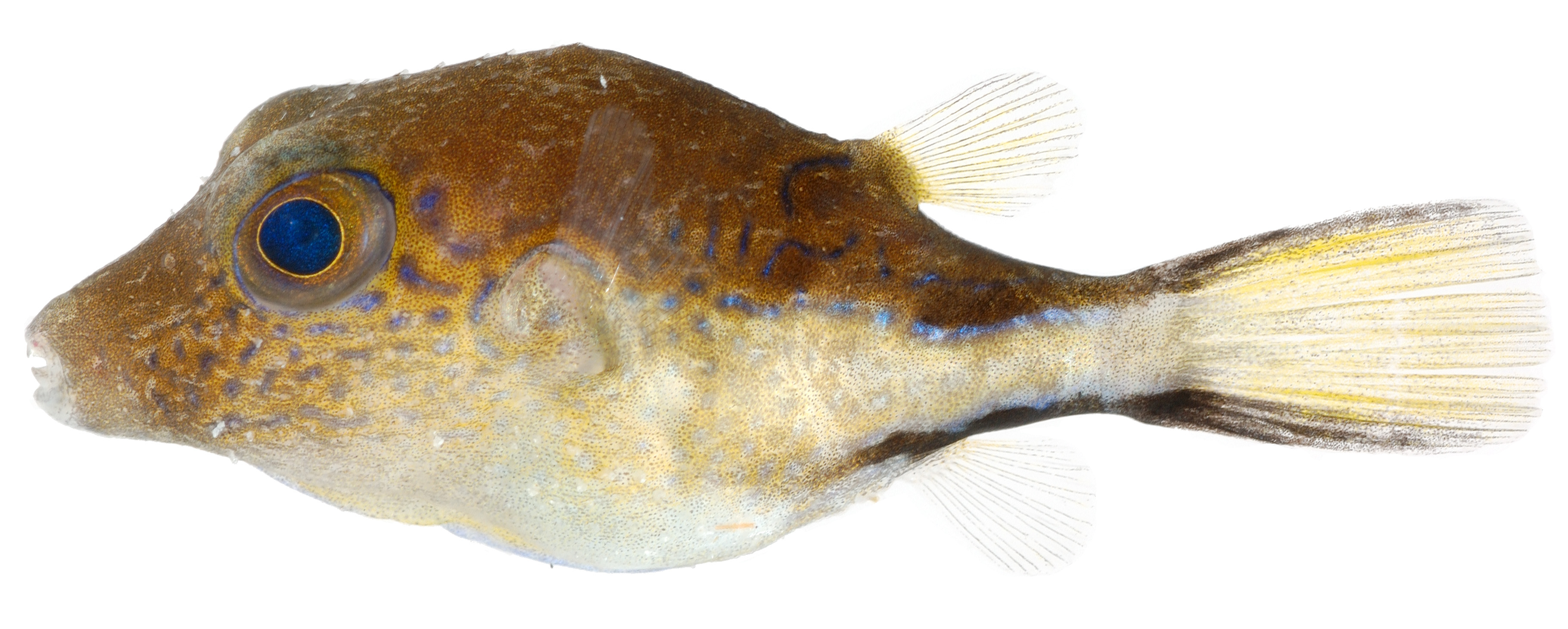
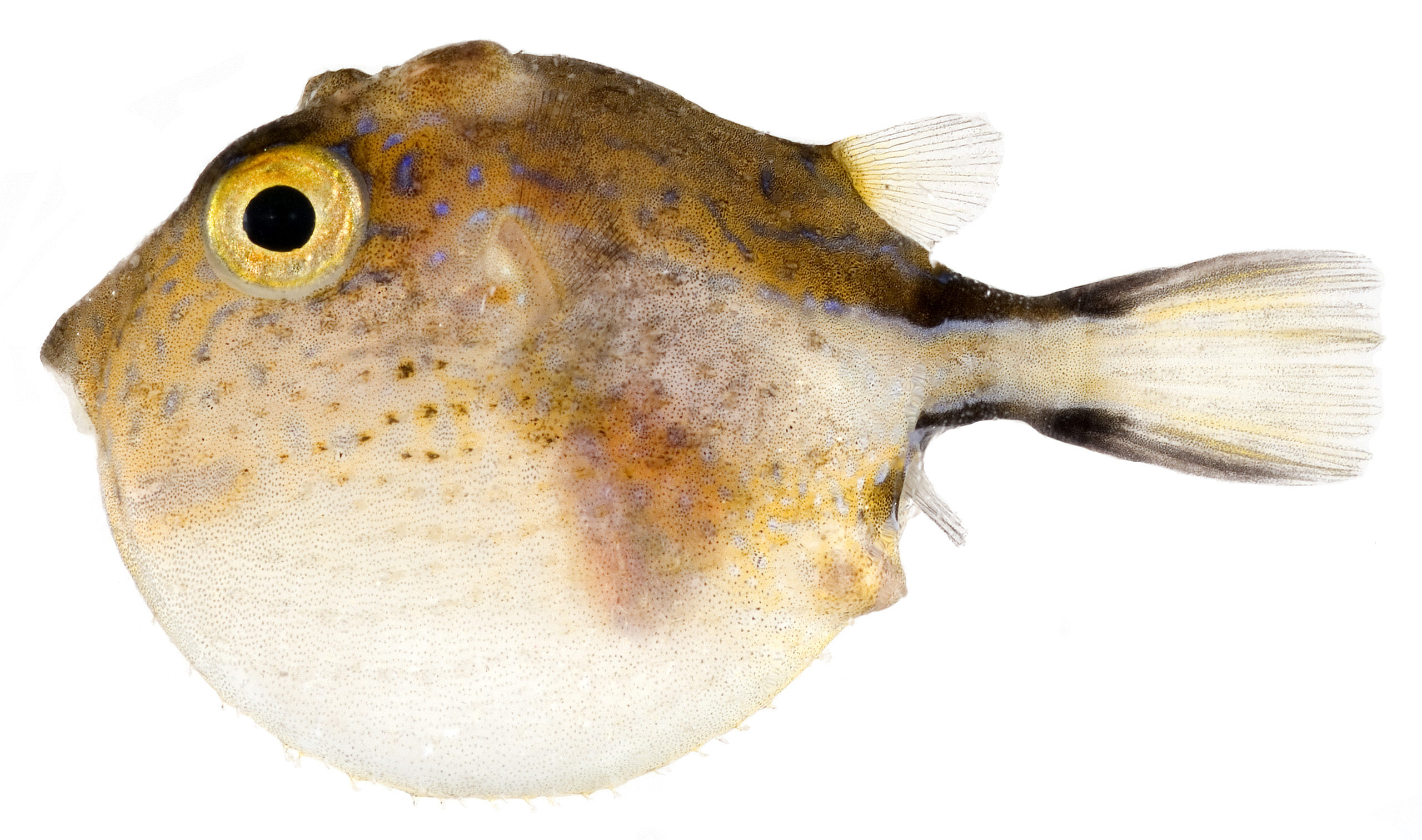
Normal and inflated pufferfish. Top: Guineafowl puffer (Arothron meleagris), Bottom: Caribbean sharp-nose puffer (Canthigaster rostrata)

The puffer's natural defenses help compensate for its slow locomotion. It moves by combining pectoral, dorsal, anal, and caudal fin motions. This makes it highly maneuverable, but very slow, so a comparatively easy predation target. Its tail fin is mainly used as a rudder, but it can be used for a sudden evasive burst of speed that shows none of the care and precision of its usual movements. The puffer's excellent eyesight, combined with this speed burst, is the first and most important defense against predators.

Puffers are able to move their eyes independently, and many species can change the color or intensity of their patterns in response to environmental changes. In these respects, they are somewhat similar to the terrestrial chameleon. Although most puffers are drab, many have bright colors and distinctive markings, and make no attempt to hide from predators. This is likely an example of honestly signaled aposematism.

==== Inflation ====
The pufferfish's secondary defense mechanism, used if successfully pursued, is to fill its extremely elastic stomach with water (or air when outside the water) until it is much larger and almost spherical in shape. Even if they are not visible when the puffer is not inflated, all puffers have pointed spines, so a hungry predator may suddenly find itself facing an unpalatable, prickly balloon that is much more voluminous than what initially seemed a slow, easy meal. Predators that do not heed this warning (or are "lucky" enough to swallow the puffer suddenly, before or during inflation) may die from choking.

==== Toxicity ====
Predators that do manage to swallow pufferfish may find their stomachs full of tetrodotoxin (TTX), making puffers an unpleasant, possibly lethal, choice of prey. Generally, this neurotoxin is found primarily in the ovaries and liver, although smaller amounts exist in the intestines and skin, as well as trace amounts in muscle. It does not always have a lethal effect on large predators such as sharks, but it can kill humans.

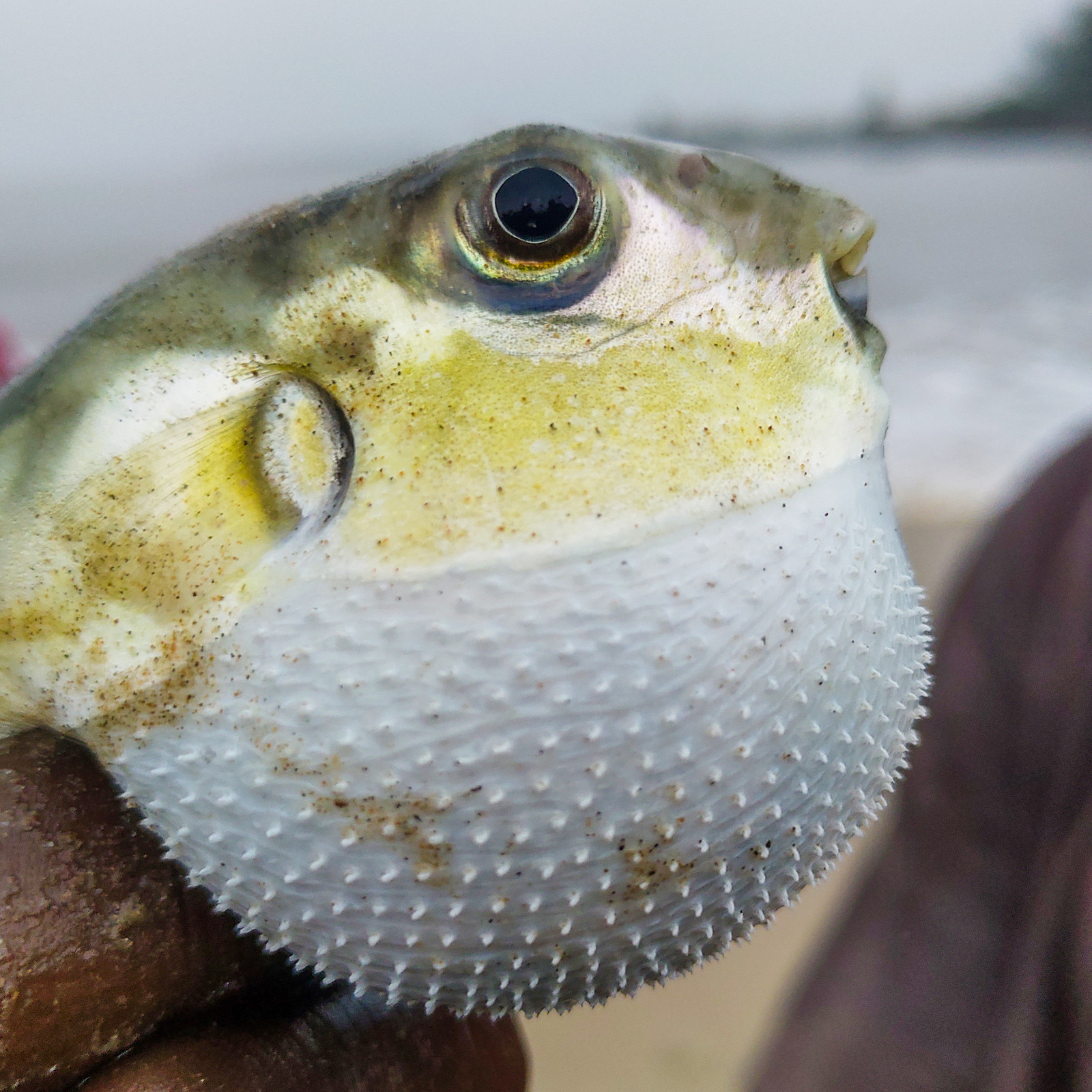
Handpicked Lagocephalus puffer from a day's catch before being thrown back to prevent poisoning. Tarkwa bay, Lagos

Toxicity varies widely between species; the flesh of the northern puffer is not toxic (although a level of poison can be found in its viscera) and it is eaten in North America. In some toxic species, the toxicity of the flesh falls within acceptable levels for human consumption. On the other hand, many species often have highly toxic flesh that is highly dangerous for human consumption, such as Chelonodon patoca, Arothron manillensis, A. nigropunctatus, and A. hispidus. Toxicity can vary widely between species that look highly similar; Lagocephalus lunaris is notorious for its highly toxic flesh, while Lagocephalus wheeleri is considered nontoxic. Toxin levels can vary widely even in species that are poisonous. TTX is accumulated in pufferfish from their diet. As a result, Japan farms torafugu or tiger puffer (Takifugu rubripes) with a controlled diet that renders the entire fish non-toxic for human consumption, even the liver and other organs.

A puffer's neurotoxin is not necessarily as toxic to other animals as it is to humans, and puffers are eaten routinely by some species of fish, such as lizardfish and sharks.

A study of Takifugu alboplumbeus showed that larvae are chemically defended by tetrodotoxin inherited from their mother's body. This maternal tetrodotoxin protects larvae from predators during a vulnerable stage in their life. On the other hand, larvae of non-toxic cultured parents are similarly non-toxic.

Dolphins have been filmed expertly handling pufferfish amongst themselves in an apparent attempt to get intoxicated or enter a trance-like state.

=== Reproduction ===
Many marine puffers have a pelagic, or open-ocean, life stage. Spawning occurs after males slowly push females to the water surface or join females already present. The eggs are spherical and buoyant. Hatching occurs after roughly four days. The fry are tiny, but under magnification have a shape usually reminiscent of a pufferfish. They have a functional mouth and eyes, and must eat within a few days. Brackish-water puffers may breed in bays in a manner similar to marine species, or may breed more similarly to the freshwater species, in cases where they have moved far enough upriver.

Reproduction in freshwater species varies quite a bit. The dwarf puffers court with males following females, possibly displaying the crests and keels unique to this subgroup of species. After the female accepts his advances, she will lead the male into plants or another form of cover, where she can release eggs for fertilization. The male may help her by rubbing against her side. This has been observed in captivity, and they are the only commonly captive-spawned puffer species.

Target-group puffers have also been spawned in aquaria, and follow a similar courting behavior, minus the crest/keel display. Eggs are laid, though, on a flat piece of slate or other smooth, hard material, to which they adhere. The male will guard them until they hatch, carefully blowing water over them regularly to keep the eggs healthy. His parenting is finished when the young hatch and the fry are on their own.

In 2012, males of the species Torquigener albomaculosus were documented while carving large and complex geometric, circular structures in the seabed sand in Amami Ōshima, Japan. The structures serve to attract females and to provide a safe place for them to lay their eggs.

Information on breeding of specific species is very limited. D. nigroviridis, the green-spotted puffer, has recently been spawned artificially under captive conditions. It is believed to spawn in bays in a similar manner to saltwater species, as their sperm was found to be motile only at full marine salinities, but wild breeding has never been observed. Xenopterus naritus has been reported to be the first bred artificially in Sarawak, Northwestern Borneo, in June 2016, and the main purpose was for development of aquaculture of the species.

Spots, stripes and elaborations

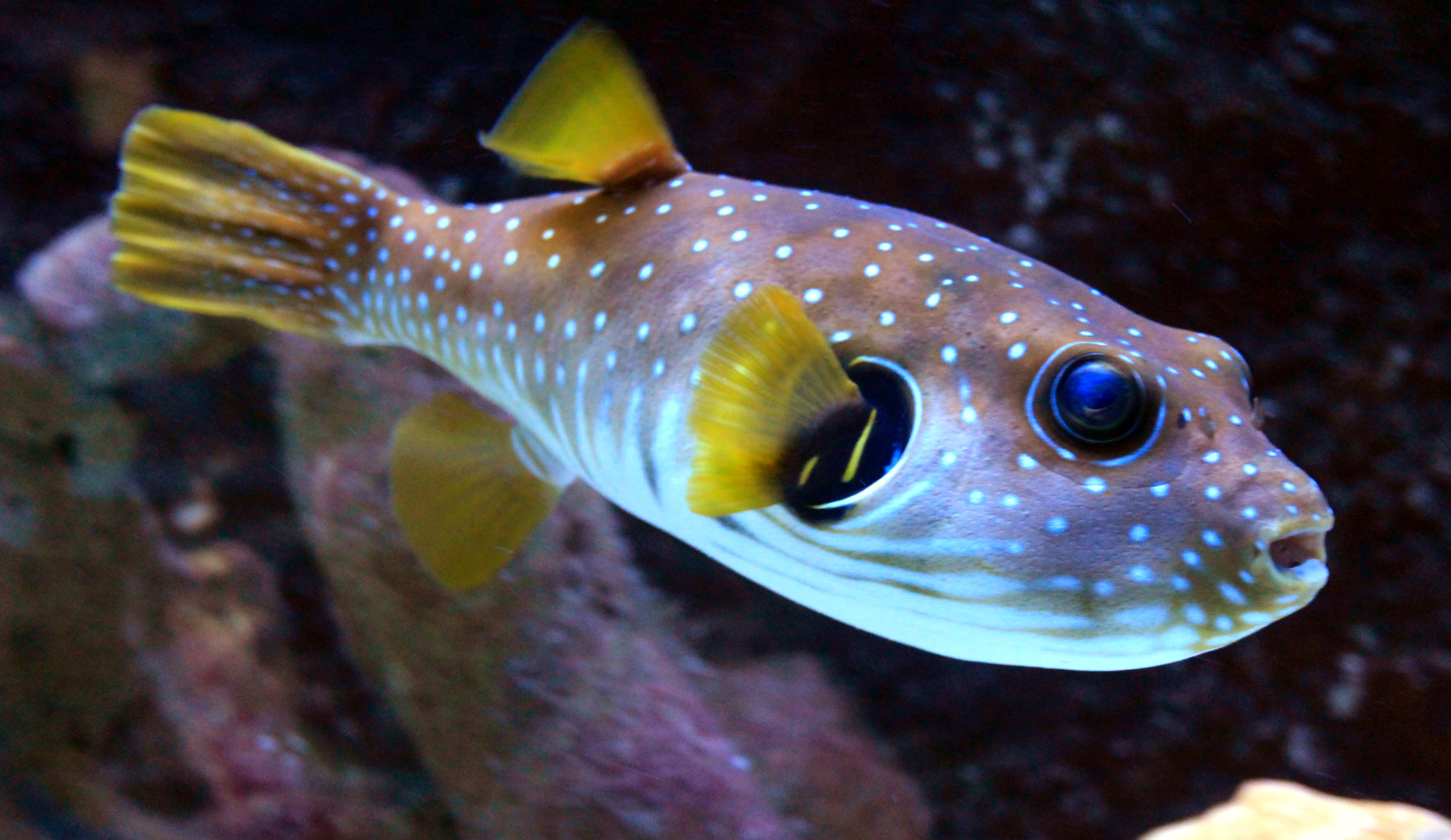
White-spotted puffer

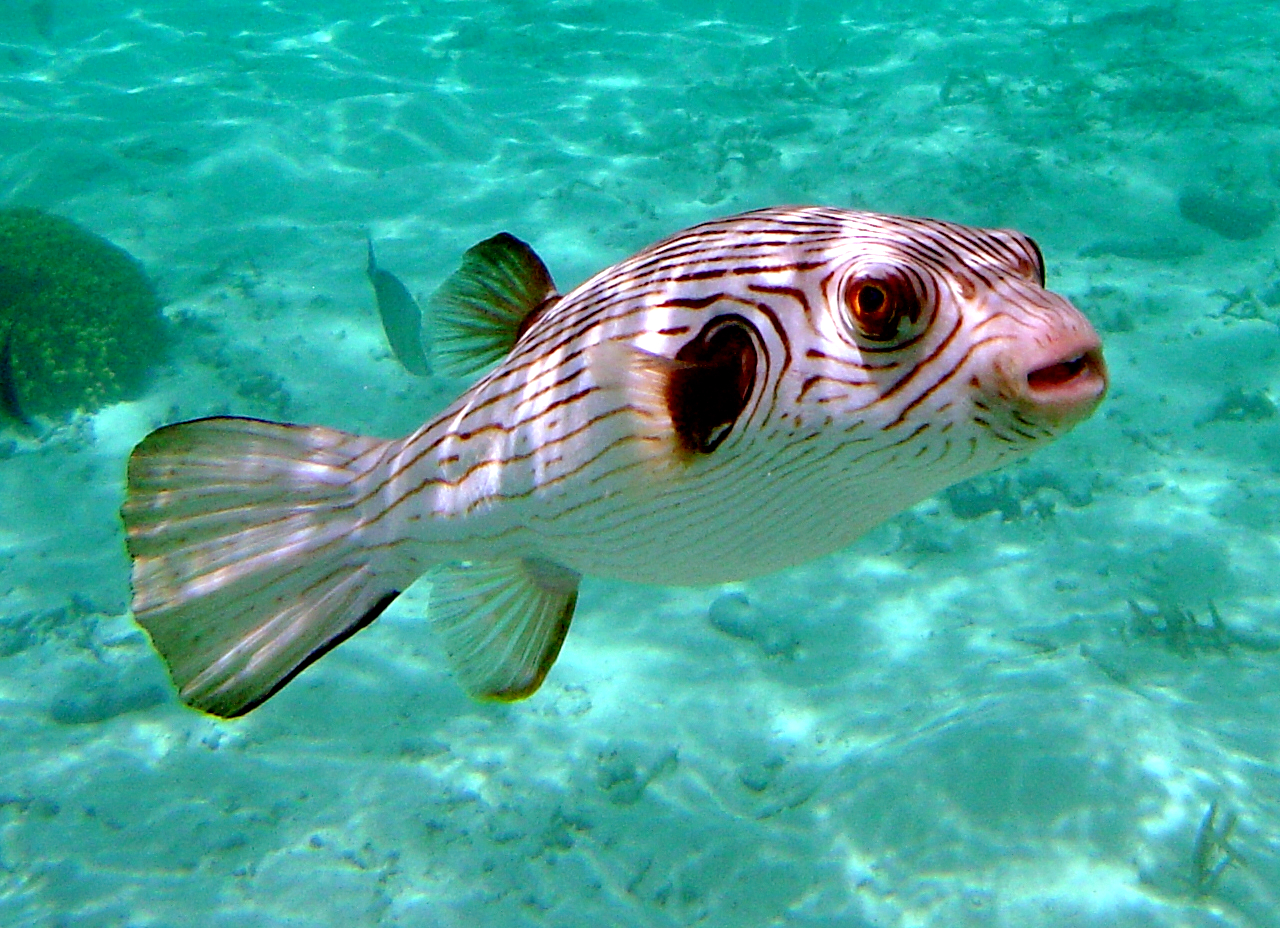
Striped puffer

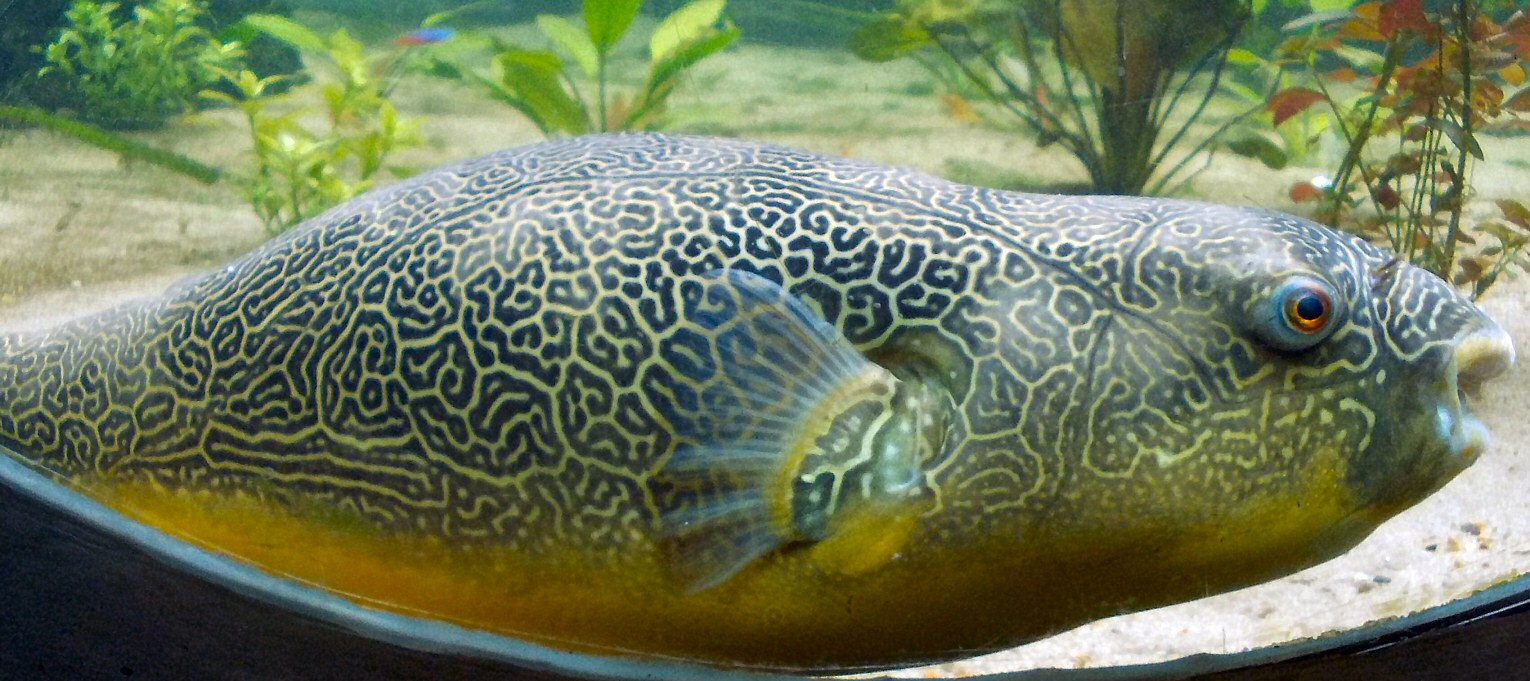
Elaborate skin pattern of the giant or mbu puffer

== Poisoning ==
The source of tetrodotoxin in puffers has been a matter of debate, but it is increasingly accepted that bacteria in the fish's intestinal tract are the source.

Saxitoxin, the cause of paralytic shellfish poisoning and red tide, can also be found in certain puffers.

=== Symptoms ===
Pufferfish can be lethal if not served properly. Puffer poisoning usually results from consumption of incorrectly prepared puffer soup, fugu chiri, or occasionally from raw puffer meat, sashimi fugu. While chiri is much more likely to cause death, sashimi fugu often causes intoxication, light-headedness, and numbness of the lips.

Pufferfish tetrodotoxin deadens the tongue and lips, and induces dizziness and vomiting, followed by numbness and prickling over the body, rapid heart rate, decreased blood pressure, and muscle paralysis. The toxin paralyzes the diaphragm muscle and stops the person who has ingested it from breathing. People who live longer than 24 hours typically survive, although possibly after a coma lasting several days.

=== Treatment ===
Treatment is mainly supportive and consists of intestinal decontamination with gastric lavage and activated charcoal, and life-support until the toxin is metabolized. Case reports suggest anticholinesterases such as edrophonium may be effective.

=== By country ===
==== Philippines ====
In September 2012, the Bureau of Fisheries and Aquatic Resources in the Philippines issued a warning not to eat pufferfish after local fishermen died after consuming pufferfish for dinner. The warning indicated that pufferfish toxin is 100 times more potent than cyanide. Fisheries Administrative Order No. 249 of 2014 bans the distribution of raw and processed pufferfish to mitigate poisoning incidents.

==== Thailand ====
Pufferfish, called pakapao in Thailand, are usually consumed by mistake. They are often cheaper than other fish, and because they contain inconsistent levels of toxins between fish and season, there is little awareness or monitoring of the danger. Consumers are regularly hospitalized and some even die from the poisoning.

==== United States ====
Cases of neurological symptoms, including numbness and tingling of the lips and mouth, have been reported to rise after the consumption of puffers caught in the area of Titusville, Florida, US. The symptoms generally resolve within hours to days, although one affected individual required intubation for 72 hours. As a result, Florida banned the harvesting of puffers from certain bodies of water.

== See also ==
- Shimonoseki – Japanese city known for its locally caught pufferfish
- Yangzhong – Chinese city known for its pufferfish aquaculture and cuisine
- Toado – common Australian name for local varieties of pufferfish
