= Gymnothorax pikei =

Conservation status
- Least Concern (IUCN 3.1)

Scientific classification
- Kingdom: Animalia
- Phylum: Chordata
- Class: Actinopterygii
- Order: Anguilliformes
- Family: Muraenidae
- Genus: Gymnothorax
- Species: G. pikei

Binomial name
- Gymnothorax pikei Bliss, 1883

Species of fish

Gymnothorax pikei, or Pike's moray, is a rare moray eel found in the western Pacific and Indian Oceans. It was first named by Bliss in 1883. The species is represented by only two specimens – the type specimen discovered in 1883, and a second found in 1962. It is very similar to two other species, Gymnothorax berndti and Gymnothorax ypsilon, and is distinguished from the latter by fewer black lines and the presence of horizontal black lines towards the tail, and differs from both species in the absence of a white margin along the anal fin.
