= Pygmy moray =

Pygmy moray is a common name for several fishes and may refer to:

- Anarchias similis
- Gymnothorax robinsi
