= Marbled reef-eel =

Marbled reef-eel may refer to:

- Uropterygius marmoratus, Marbled reef-eel, or slender conger eel
- Anarchias seychellensis, Seychelles moray, or marbled reef-eel
- Gymnothorax obesus, Speckled moray, or marbled reef eel
