= Mottled moray =

Mottled moray may refer to three species of eels:

- Echidna delicatula, or the fine-speckled moray
- Gymnothorax prionodon, or the Australian mottled moray
- Gymnothorax undulatus, or the undulated moray
