= Brown-spotted moray eel =

Conservation status
- Least Concern (IUCN 3.1)

Scientific classification
- Kingdom: Animalia
- Phylum: Chordata
- Class: Actinopterygii
- Order: Anguilliformes
- Family: Muraenidae
- Genus: Gymnothorax
- Species: G. fuscomaculatus

Binomial name
- Gymnothorax fuscomaculatus (L. P. Schultz, 1953)

Species of fish

The brown-spotted moray (Gymnothorax fuscomaculatus) is a moray eel found in coral reefs in the Pacific and Indian Oceans. It was first named by Schultz in 1953 and is also commonly known as the freckled moray.
