= Gymnothorax microstictus =

Conservation status
- Least Concern (IUCN 3.1)

Scientific classification
- Kingdom: Animalia
- Phylum: Chordata
- Class: Actinopterygii
- Order: Anguilliformes
- Family: Muraenidae
- Genus: Gymnothorax
- Species: G. microstictus

Binomial name
- Gymnothorax microstictus E. B. Böhlke, 2000

Species of fish

The smallspot moray (Gymnothorax microstictus) is a moray eel found in the western central Pacific Ocean around Papua New Guinea. It was first named by Böhlke in 2000.
