= Gymnothorax sagenodeta =

Scientific classification
- Kingdom: Animalia
- Phylum: Chordata
- Class: Actinopterygii
- Order: Anguilliformes
- Family: Muraenidae
- Genus: Gymnothorax
- Species: G. sagenodeta

Binomial name
- Gymnothorax sagenodeta (J. Richardson, 1848)

Species of fish

Gymnothorax sagenodeta is a moray eel found in the western Indian Ocean, around Mauritius. It was first named by John Richardson in 1848. This species is classified as Nomen dubium by FishBase, but is accepted by the World Register of Marine Species.
