= Easter Island moray eel =

Scientific classification
- Kingdom: Animalia
- Phylum: Chordata
- Class: Actinopterygii
- Order: Anguilliformes
- Family: Muraenidae
- Genus: Gymnothorax
- Species: G. nasuta

Binomial name
- Gymnothorax nasuta F. de Buen, 1961

Species of fish

The Easter Island moray (Gymnothorax nasuta) is a moray eel found in the southeast Pacific Ocean, around Easter Island and Chile. It was first named by de Buen in 1961.
