= Ringed moray =

Scientific classification
- Kingdom: Animalia
- Phylum: Chordata
- Class: Actinopterygii
- Order: Anguilliformes
- Family: Muraenidae
- Genus: Gymnothorax
- Species: G. annulatus

Binomial name
- Gymnothorax annulatus D. G. Smith & E. B. Böhlke, 1997

Species of fish

The ringed moray (Gymnothorax annulatus) is a moray eel found in the western Pacific Ocean, around the Philippines and Thailand. It was first named by D. G. Smith and Eugenia B. Böhlke in 1997.
