= Short-tooth moray eel =

Conservation status
- Least Concern (IUCN 3.1)

Scientific classification
- Kingdom: Animalia
- Phylum: Chordata
- Class: Actinopterygii
- Order: Anguilliformes
- Family: Muraenidae
- Genus: Gymnothorax
- Species: G. kontodontos

Binomial name
- Gymnothorax kontodontos E. B. Böhlke, 2000

Species of fish

The short-tooth moray (Gymnothorax kontodontos) is a moray eel found in coral reefs in the eastern central Pacific Ocean around Fanning Island.
