= Gymnothorax formosus =

Conservation status
- Least Concern (IUCN 3.1)

Scientific classification
- Kingdom: Animalia
- Phylum: Chordata
- Class: Actinopterygii
- Order: Anguilliformes
- Family: Muraenidae
- Genus: Gymnothorax
- Species: G. formosus

Binomial name
- Gymnothorax formosus Bleeker, 1864

Species of fish

Gymnothorax formosus is a species of moray eel found in the western central Pacific Ocean. It was first named by Pieter Bleeker in 1864.
