= Gymnothorax parini =

Scientific classification
- Kingdom: Animalia
- Phylum: Chordata
- Class: Actinopterygii
- Order: Anguilliformes
- Family: Muraenidae
- Genus: Gymnothorax
- Species: G. parini

Binomial name
- Gymnothorax parini Collette, D. G. Smith & E. B. Böhlke, 1991

Species of fish

Gymnothorax parini is a moray eel found in the western Indian Ocean, around Walters Shoals. It was first named by Collette, Smith and Böhlke in 1991.
