= One-spot moray eel =

Conservation status
- Least Concern (IUCN 3.1)

Scientific classification
- Kingdom: Animalia
- Phylum: Chordata
- Class: Actinopterygii
- Order: Anguilliformes
- Family: Muraenidae
- Genus: Gymnothorax
- Species: G. monostigma

Binomial name
- Gymnothorax monostigma (Regan, 1909)

Species of fish

The one-spot moray (Gymnothorax monostigma) is a moray eel found in coral reefs in the Pacific and Indian Oceans. It was first named by Charles Tate Regan in 1909.
