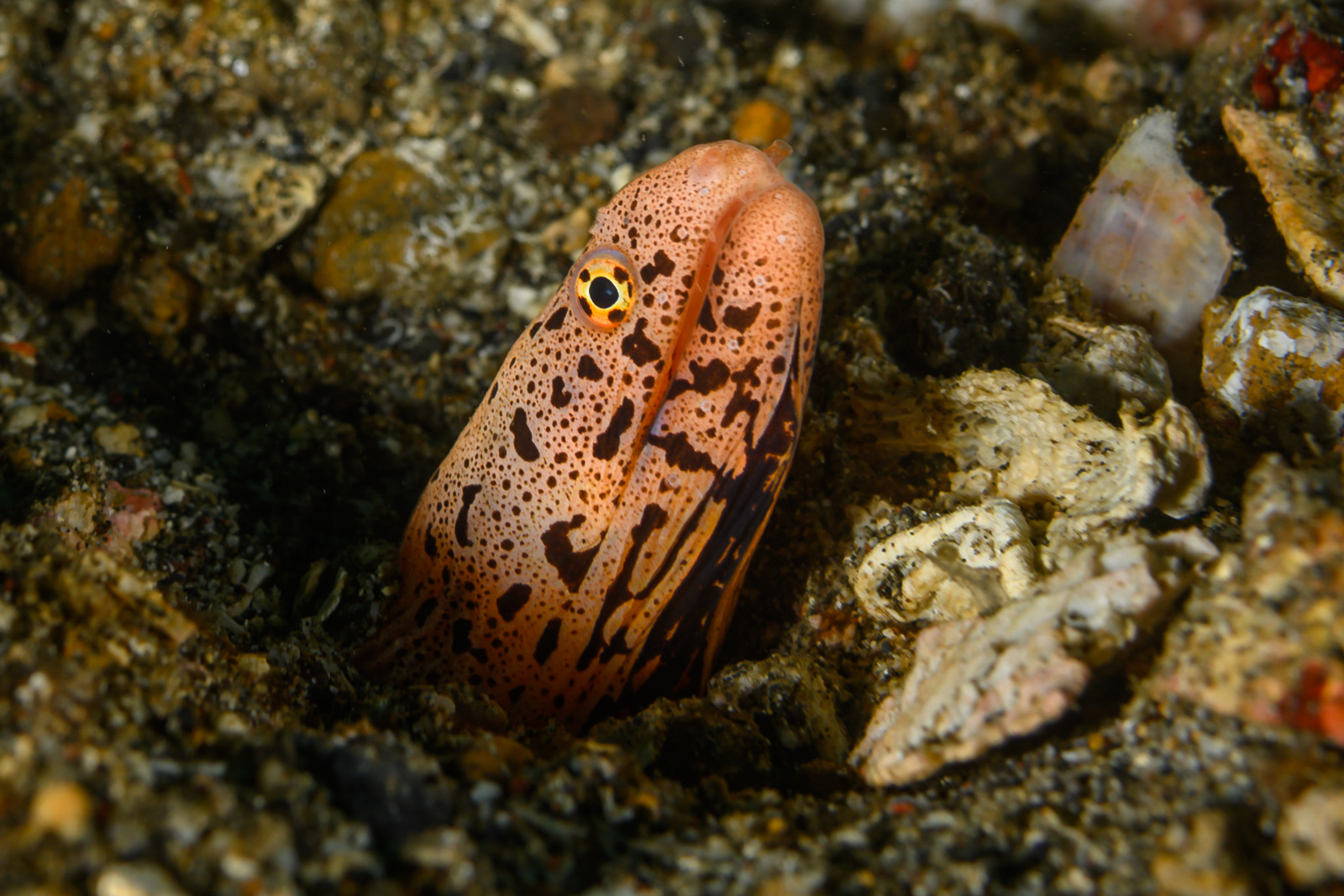

Conservation status
- Least Concern (IUCN 3.1)

Scientific classification
- Kingdom: Animalia
- Phylum: Chordata
- Class: Actinopterygii
- Order: Anguilliformes
- Family: Muraenidae
- Genus: Gymnothorax
- Species: G. chlamydatus

Binomial name
- Gymnothorax chlamydatus Snyder, 1908

= Banded mud moray eel =

Species of fish

The banded mud moray (Gymnothorax chlamydatus) is a moray eel found in coral reefs in the western Pacific Ocean (Taiwan and Indonesia). It was first named by Snyder in 1908, because of dark bands along its body.
