= Whitetip moray eel =

Whitetip moray

Scientific classification
- Domain: Eukaryota
- Kingdom: Animalia
- Phylum: Chordata
- Class: Actinopterygii
- Order: Anguilliformes
- Family: Muraenidae
- Genus: Gymnothorax
- Species: G. intesi

Binomial name
- Gymnothorax intesi (Fourmanoir & Rivaton, 1979)

Species of fish

The whitetip moray (Gymnothorax intesi) is a moray eel found in the western Pacific Ocean, around New Caledonia. It was first named by Fourmanoir and Rivaton in 1979.
