= Gymnothorax panamensis =

Conservation status
- Least Concern (IUCN 3.1)

Scientific classification
- Kingdom: Animalia
- Phylum: Chordata
- Class: Actinopterygii
- Order: Anguilliformes
- Family: Muraenidae
- Genus: Gymnothorax
- Species: G. panamensis

Binomial name
- Gymnothorax panamensis (Steindachner, 1876)

Species of fish

Gymnothorax panamensis, the masked moray or Panamic moray, is a moray eel found in the eastern Pacific Ocean.
