= Gymnothorax shaoi =

Conservation status
- Data Deficient (IUCN 3.1)

Scientific classification
- Kingdom: Animalia
- Phylum: Chordata
- Class: Actinopterygii
- Order: Anguilliformes
- Family: Muraenidae
- Genus: Gymnothorax
- Species: G. shaoi

Binomial name
- Gymnothorax shaoi H. M. Chen & K. H. Loh, 2007

Species of eel

Gymnothorax shaoi, or Shao's moray eel, is an eel in the family Muraenidae (moray eels). It is a marine, temperate-water eel known from Taiwan, in the northwest Pacific Ocean. Males are known to reach a maximum total length of 60.8 cm.

The species epithet and common name were provided by the authors in honour of Kwang-Tsao Shao, whom they credited for supportive contributions both to the fish database in Taiwan and to their own eel-related studies.
