= Gymnothorax porphyreus =

Conservation status
- Least Concern (IUCN 3.1)

Scientific classification
- Kingdom: Animalia
- Phylum: Chordata
- Class: Actinopterygii
- Order: Anguilliformes
- Family: Muraenidae
- Genus: Gymnothorax
- Species: G. porphyreus

Binomial name
- Gymnothorax porphyreus (Guichenot, 1848)

Species of fish

Gymnothorax porphyreus is a moray eel found in the south Pacific ocean. It was first named by Guichenot in 1848, and is commonly known as the lowfin moray.
