= Narrowtail moray =

Scientific classification
- Kingdom: Animalia
- Phylum: Chordata
- Class: Actinopterygii
- Order: Anguilliformes
- Family: Muraenidae
- Genus: Gymnothorax
- Species: G. angusticauda

Binomial name
- Gymnothorax angusticauda (Weber & de Beaufort, 1916)

Species of fish

The narrowtail moray (Gymnothorax angusticauda) is a moray eel found in the Pacific and Indian Oceans, in the Red Sea, and around Indonesia. It was first named by Weber and de Beaufort in 1916.
