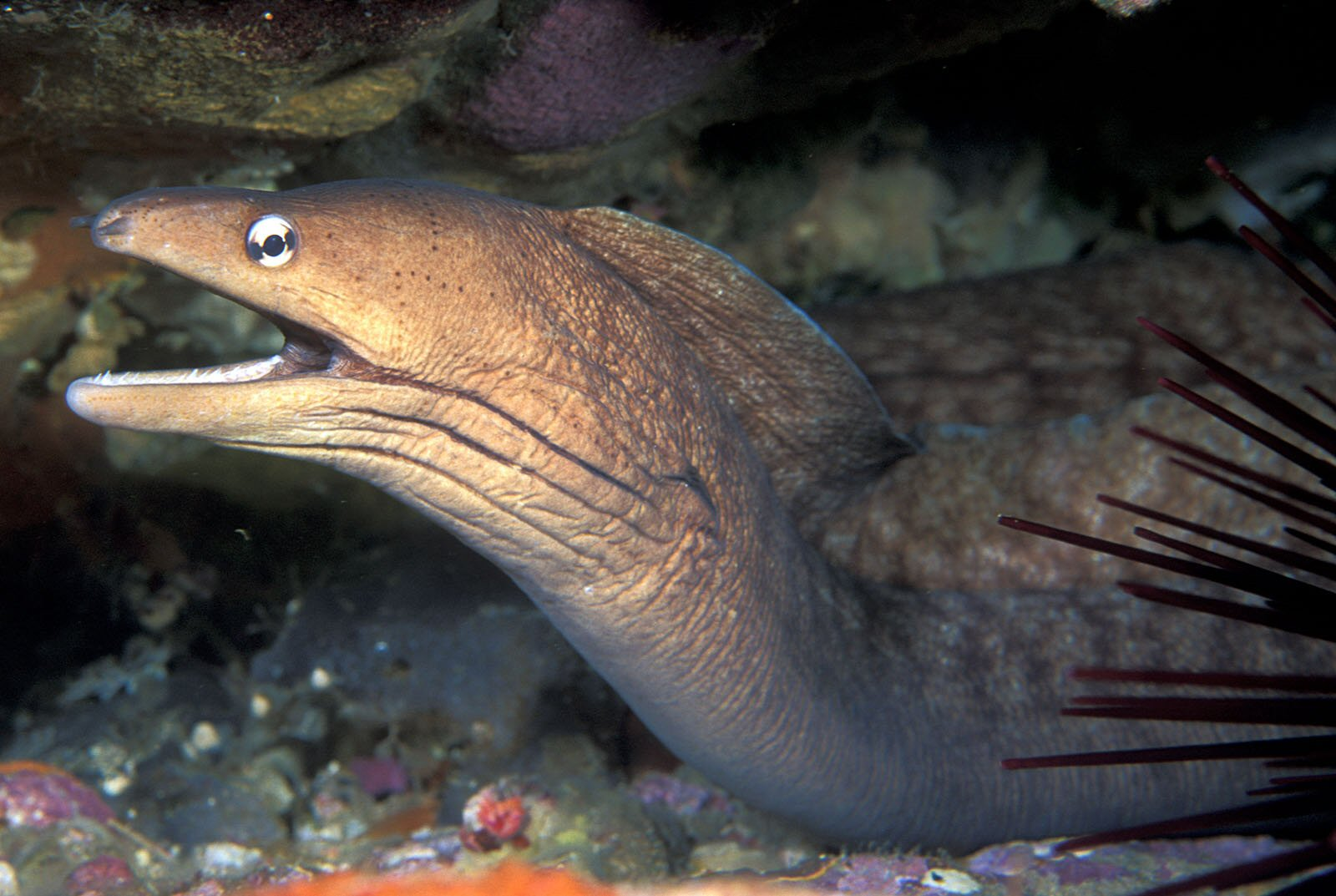

Conservation status
- Least Concern (IUCN 3.1)

Scientific classification
- Kingdom: Animalia
- Phylum: Chordata
- Class: Actinopterygii
- Order: Anguilliformes
- Family: Muraenidae
- Genus: Gymnothorax
- Species: G. nubilus

Binomial name
- Gymnothorax nubilus (J. Richardson, 1848)

= Grey moray =

Species of fish

The grey moray (Gymnothorax nubilus) is a moray eel of the genus Gymnothorax, found around the offshore islands off Northland and the Bay of Plenty on the North Island of New Zealand.
