= Gymnothorax megaspilus =

Conservation status
- Least Concern (IUCN 3.1)

Scientific classification
- Kingdom: Animalia
- Phylum: Chordata
- Class: Actinopterygii
- Order: Anguilliformes
- Family: Muraenidae
- Genus: Gymnothorax
- Species: G. megaspilus

Binomial name
- Gymnothorax megaspilus E. B. Böhlke & J. E. Randall, 1995

Species of fish

Gymnothorax megaspilus, the Oman moray, is a moray eel found in the western Indian Ocean.
