= Gymnothorax randalli =

Conservation status
- Data Deficient (IUCN 3.1)

Scientific classification
- Kingdom: Animalia
- Phylum: Chordata
- Class: Actinopterygii
- Order: Anguilliformes
- Family: Muraenidae
- Genus: Gymnothorax
- Species: G. randalli

Binomial name
- Gymnothorax randalli D. G. Smith & E. B. Böhlke, 1997

Species of fish

Gymnothorax randalli, Randall's moray, is a moray eel found in the Pacific and Indian Oceans. It was first named by David G. Smith and Eugenia Brandt Böhlke in 1997, and can reach a maximum length of approximately 36 centimetres.
