= Southern moray eel =

Conservation status
- Data Deficient (IUCN 3.1)

Scientific classification
- Kingdom: Animalia
- Phylum: Chordata
- Class: Actinopterygii
- Order: Anguilliformes
- Family: Muraenidae
- Genus: Gymnothorax
- Species: G. austrinus

Binomial name
- Gymnothorax austrinus E. B. Böhlke & McCosker, 2001

Species of fish

The southern moray (Gymnothorax austrinus) is a moray eel found in the eastern Indian Ocean, around Victoria, Australia. It was first named by Eugenia Brandt Böhlke and John E. McCosker in 2001. It lives in moderate-temperature, marine habitat; it is a demersal fish. The maximum length discovered was a female at 88.2 cm long.
