= Gymnothorax longinquus =

Conservation status
- Least Concern (IUCN 3.1)

Scientific classification
- Kingdom: Animalia
- Phylum: Chordata
- Class: Actinopterygii
- Order: Anguilliformes
- Family: Muraenidae
- Genus: Gymnothorax
- Species: G. longinquus

Binomial name
- Gymnothorax longinquus (Whitley, 1948)

Species of fish

Gymnothorax longinquus is a moray eel found in coral reefs in the southwest Pacific Ocean. It is commonly known as the yellow-gilled reef-eel, yellow-gilled moray, brown moray-eel, or long moray.
