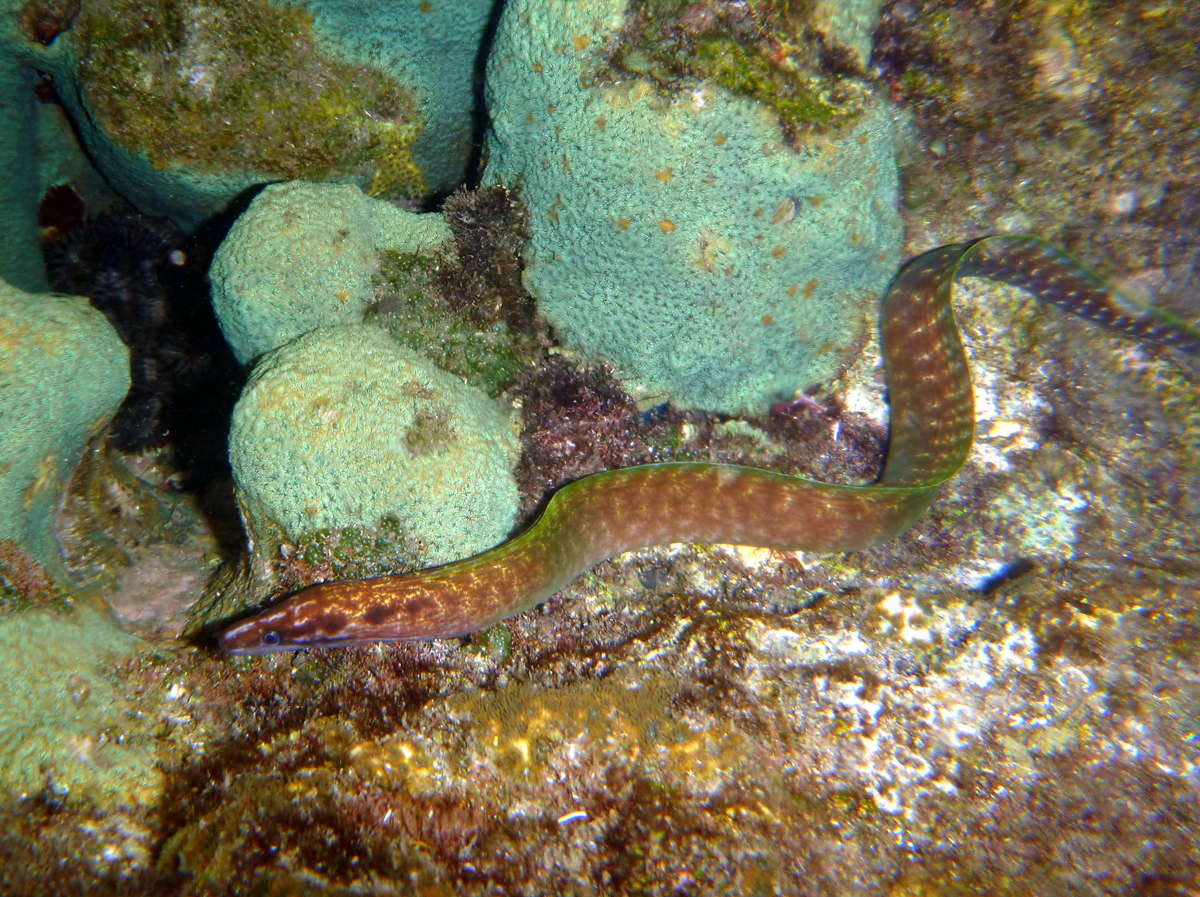

Conservation status
- Least Concern (IUCN 3.1)

Scientific classification
- Kingdom: Animalia
- Phylum: Chordata
- Class: Actinopterygii
- Division: Teleostei
- Order: Anguilliformes
- Family: Muraenidae
- Genus: Gymnothorax
- Species: G. margaritophorus

Binomial name
- Gymnothorax margaritophorus Bleeker, 1864

= Gymnothorax margaritophorus =

Species of fish

Gymnothorax margaritophorus is a moray eel found in coral reefs in the Pacific and Indian Oceans. It was first named by Pieter Bleeker in 1864 and is commonly known as the blotch-necked moray, blackpearl moray, pearly moray, pearly reef-eel, or trunk-eyed moray.
