= White-edged moray =

Conservation status
- Least Concern (IUCN 3.1)

Scientific classification
- Kingdom: Animalia
- Phylum: Chordata
- Class: Actinopterygii
- Order: Anguilliformes
- Family: Muraenidae
- Genus: Gymnothorax
- Species: G. verrilli

Binomial name
- Gymnothorax verrilli (D. S. Jordan & C. H. Gilbert, 1883)

Species of fish

The white-edged moray (Gymnothorax verrilli) is a moray eel found in the eastern central Pacific Ocean, from Panama to Baja California. It lives on shallow-water sandy and muddy bottoms, and can grow to 43 cm (17 in) length.
