= Gymnothorax tamilnaduensis =

Scientific classification
- Kingdom: Animalia
- Phylum: Chordata
- Class: Actinopterygii
- Order: Anguilliformes
- Family: Muraenidae
- Genus: Gymnothorax
- Species: G. tamilnaduensis

Binomial name
- Gymnothorax tamilnaduensis Kodeeswaran, Kantharajan, Mohapatra, Kumar & Sarkar, 2023

Species of fish

Gymnothorax tamilnaduensis is a species of moray eel native to the southeast coast of India, more specifically the Bay of Bengal, on the coast of Tamil Nadu. The body lacks any pattern of spots or stripes, and is very short compared to other morays. The first specimens of the species were collected at a depth of 25–30 meters.
