= White-spotted moray eel =

Conservation status
- Least Concern (IUCN 3.1)

Scientific classification
- Kingdom: Animalia
- Phylum: Chordata
- Class: Actinopterygii
- Order: Anguilliformes
- Family: Muraenidae
- Genus: Gymnothorax
- Species: G. johnsoni

Binomial name
- Gymnothorax johnsoni (J. L. B. Smith, 1962)

Species of fish

The white-spotted moray (Gymnothorax johnsoni) is a moray eel found in the western Indian Ocean. It was first named by Smith in 1962.
