= Gymnothorax enigmaticus =

Conservation status
- Least Concern (IUCN 3.1)

Scientific classification
- Kingdom: Animalia
- Phylum: Chordata
- Class: Actinopterygii
- Order: Anguilliformes
- Family: Muraenidae
- Genus: Gymnothorax
- Species: G. enigmaticus

Binomial name
- Gymnothorax enigmaticus McCosker & J. E. Randall, 1982

Species of fish

Gymnothorax enigmaticus, the enigmatic moray, tiger moray or banded moray, is a moray eel found in coral reefs in the Pacific and Indian oceans. It was first named by McCosker and Randall in 1982,
