= Gymnothorax aurocephalus =

Scientific classification
- Domain: Eukaryota
- Kingdom: Animalia
- Phylum: Chordata
- Class: Actinopterygii
- Order: Anguilliformes
- Family: Muraenidae
- Genus: Gymnothorax
- Species: G. aurocephalus

Binomial name
- Gymnothorax aurocephalus Nashad, Mohapatra, Varghese, Ramalingam, Bineesh & Mohanty, 2020

Species of fish

Gymnothorax aurocephalus is a species of moray eel described on the basis of 4 specimens found in depths of 125 to 130 m (410 to 427 ft). It was found in the Andaman and Nicobar Islands, India. The body which is deep-brown in color is covered by white spots. Its sharp, jagged teeth are arranged in a single series.
