= Atoll moray eel =

Scientific classification
- Domain: Eukaryota
- Kingdom: Animalia
- Phylum: Chordata
- Class: Actinopterygii
- Order: Anguilliformes
- Family: Muraenidae
- Genus: Gymnothorax
- Species: G. atolli

Binomial name
- Gymnothorax atolli (Pietschmann, 1935)

Species of fish

The atoll moray eel (Gymnothorax atolli) is a moray eel found in coral reefs in the eastern central Pacific Ocean. It was first named by Pietschmann in 1935.
