= Headspot moray =

Conservation status
- Least Concern (IUCN 3.1)

Scientific classification
- Kingdom: Animalia
- Phylum: Chordata
- Class: Actinopterygii
- Order: Anguilliformes
- Family: Muraenidae
- Genus: Gymnothorax
- Species: G. cephalospilus

Binomial name
- Gymnothorax cephalospilus E. B. Böhlke & McCosker, 2001

Species of fish

The headspot moray (Gymnothorax cephalospilus) is a moray eel found in the Pacific and Indian Oceans. It was first named by E.B. Böhlke and J. E. McCosker in 2001.
