= Gymnothorax indicus =

Scientific classification
- Kingdom: Animalia
- Phylum: Chordata
- Class: Actinopterygii
- Order: Anguilliformes
- Family: Muraenidae
- Genus: Gymnothorax
- Species: G. indicus

Binomial name
- Gymnothorax indicus Mohapatra, Ray, Smith & Mishra, 2016

Species of fish

Gymnothorax indicus is a species of moray eel described as being brown and long. It's native to northern Bengal, India. The species has around 194 vertebrae.

== Description ==
The body is long thin and gets thinner towards the end. Its upper jaw is marginally longer than its lower jaw. It has black spots on its midline. head is elongated with somewhat bigger eyes and its snout is dull.
