= Gymnothorax angusticeps =

Conservation status
- Least Concern (IUCN 3.1)

Scientific classification
- Kingdom: Animalia
- Phylum: Chordata
- Class: Actinopterygii
- Order: Anguilliformes
- Family: Muraenidae
- Genus: Gymnothorax
- Species: G. angusticeps

Binomial name
- Gymnothorax angusticeps (Hildebrand & F. O. Barton, 1949)

Species of fish

Gymnothorax angusticeps is a moray eel found in the southeast Pacific Ocean, around Peru. It was first named by Hildebrand and Barton in 1949. It is colloquially known as the wrinkled moray.
