= Gymnothorax andamanensis =

Scientific classification
- Kingdom: Animalia
- Phylum: Chordata
- Class: Actinopterygii
- Order: Anguilliformes
- Family: Muraenidae
- Genus: Gymnothorax
- Species: G. andamanensis

Binomial name
- Gymnothorax andamanensis Mohapatra, Kiruba-Sankar, Praveenraj & Mohanty, 2019

Species of fish

Gymnothorax andamanensis is a species from the moray eel family found in South Andaman, India. The dorsal fin is situated behind the gill, its teeth is flat and a black rim covers the jaw opening. It has around 135 to 136 vertebrae. This mid-sized fish is brown and it has an unpatterned body. It is fairly long with a dull snout and smooth teeth.
