= Black body moray =

Scientific classification
- Kingdom: Animalia
- Phylum: Chordata
- Class: Actinopterygii
- Order: Anguilliformes
- Family: Muraenidae
- Genus: Gymnothorax
- Species: G. melanosomatus

Binomial name
- Gymnothorax melanosomatus K. H. Loh, K. T. Shao & H. M. Chen, 2011

Species of fish

The black body moray (Gymnothorax melanosomatus) is an eel in the family Muraenidae (moray eels). It was described by Loh Kar-Hoe, Shao Kwang-Tsao, and Chen Hong-Ming in 2011. It is a tropical, marine eel which is known from southeastern Taiwan, off Changbin, Taitung to Shihtiping, Hualien City and in the Pacific Ocean. Males are known to reach a maximum total length of 49.6 cm, while females are known to reach a maximum of 50.4 cm.

The species epithet melansomatus means "black body" in Ancient Greek, and like the eel's common name, it refers to the black colouring of the body.
