= Deep-dwelling moray =

Conservation status
- Least Concern (IUCN 3.1)

Scientific classification
- Kingdom: Animalia
- Phylum: Chordata
- Class: Actinopterygii
- Order: Anguilliformes
- Family: Muraenidae
- Genus: Gymnothorax
- Species: G. bathyphilus

Binomial name
- Gymnothorax bathyphilus J. E. Randall & McCosker, 1975

Species of fish

The deep-dwelling moray (Gymnothorax bathyphilus) is a deepwater moray eel found in the south Pacific Ocean, around Easter Island and Desventuradas Islands. It reaches a maximum length of about 76 cm. The type specimen was taken at a depth of 250 m.
