= Gymnothorax taiwanensis =

Conservation status
- Least Concern (IUCN 3.1)

Scientific classification
- Kingdom: Animalia
- Phylum: Chordata
- Class: Actinopterygii
- Order: Anguilliformes
- Family: Muraenidae
- Genus: Gymnothorax
- Species: G. taiwanensis

Binomial name
- Gymnothorax taiwanensis Chen, Loh & Shao, 2008

Species of fish

Gymnothorax taiwanensis (Taiwanese moray eel) is a moray eel found in the northwest Pacific Ocean around Taiwan. It was described by Chen, Loh and Shao in 2008.

Gymnothorax taiwanensis occurs in shallow reef and rocky shorelines southeastern Taiwan at depths of 3–30 m (9.8–98.4 ft). It can grow to 54 cm (21 in) total length.
