= Purplemouth moray eel =

Conservation status
- Least Concern (IUCN 3.1)

Scientific classification
- Kingdom: Animalia
- Phylum: Chordata
- Class: Actinopterygii
- Division: Teleostei
- Order: Anguilliformes
- Family: Muraenidae
- Genus: Gymnothorax
- Species: G. vicinus

Binomial name
- Gymnothorax vicinus (Castelnau, 1855)

Synonyms
- Leptocephalus forsstromi

Species of fish

The purplemouth moray eel Gymnothorax vicinus, is a moray eel found in the Atlantic Ocean. It was first named by Francis de Laporte de Castelnau in 1855.
