= Gymnothorax walvisensis =

Scientific classification
- Domain: Eukaryota
- Kingdom: Animalia
- Phylum: Chordata
- Class: Actinopterygii
- Order: Anguilliformes
- Family: Muraenidae
- Genus: Gymnothorax
- Species: G. walvisensis

Binomial name
- Gymnothorax walvisensis Prokofiev, 2009

Species of fish

Gymnothorax walvisensis is an eel in the family Muraenidae (moray eels). It was described by Artem Mikhailovich Prokofiev in 2009. It is a subtropical, marine eel which is known from Walvis Ridge, in the southeastern Atlantic Ocean (from which its species epithet is derived). Males are known to reach a maximum total length of 41.3 cm.
