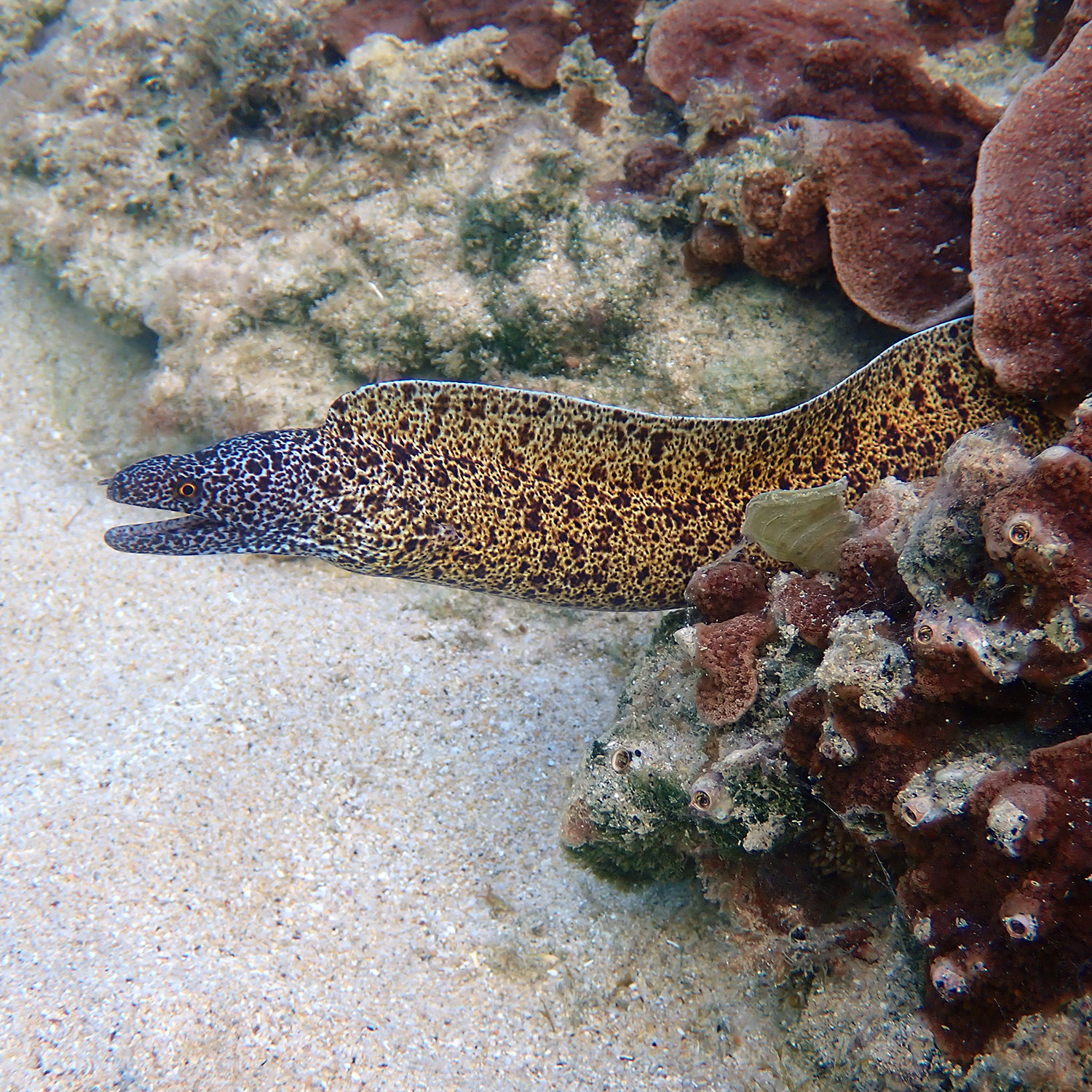

Conservation status
- Least Concern (IUCN 3.1)

Scientific classification
- Kingdom: Animalia
- Phylum: Chordata
- Class: Actinopterygii
- Order: Anguilliformes
- Family: Muraenidae
- Genus: Gymnothorax
- Species: G. annasona

Binomial name
- Gymnothorax annasona Whitley, 1937

Synonyms
- Gymnothorax flavimarginatus annasona

= Gymnothorax annasona =

Species of fish

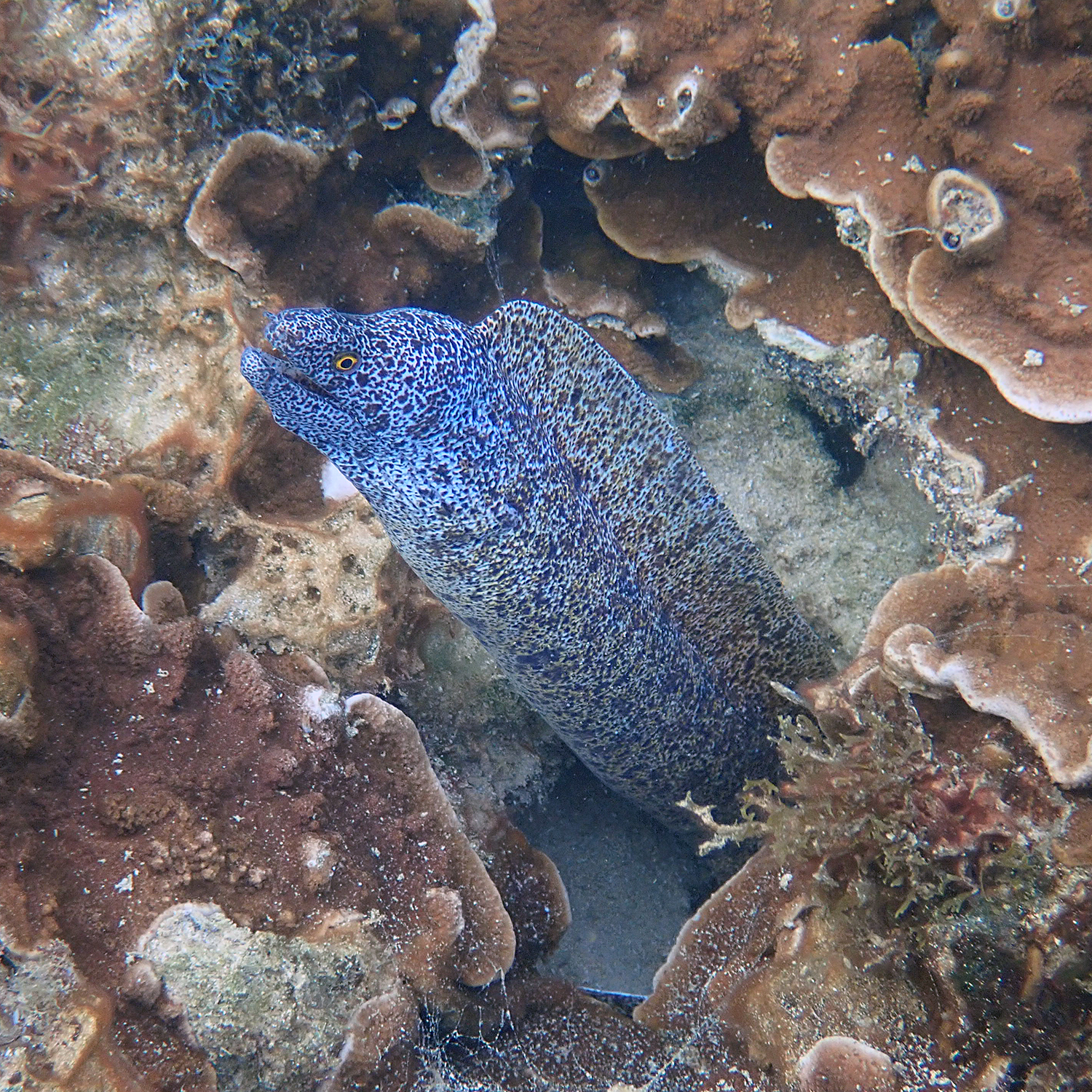

Gymnothorax annasona is a moray eel found in the southwest Pacific Ocean, around Lord Howe Island and Norfolk Island. It was described by Gilbert Percy Whitley in 1937, and is commonly known as the Lord Howe Island moray or the Lord Howe moray.

Gymnothorax annasona can grow to 55 cm (22 in) total length.
