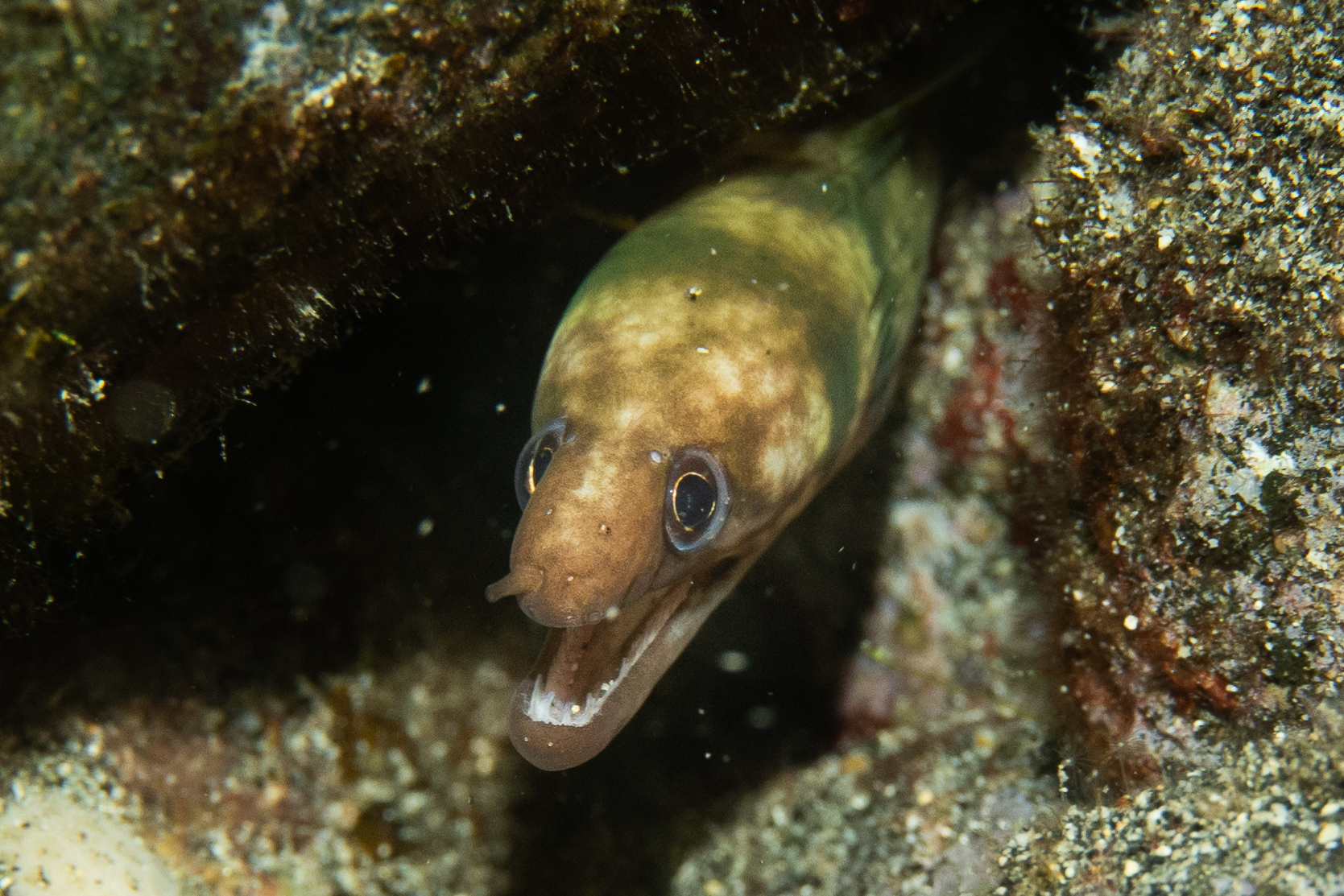

Conservation status
- Least Concern (IUCN 3.1)

Scientific classification
- Kingdom: Animalia
- Phylum: Chordata
- Class: Actinopterygii
- Order: Anguilliformes
- Family: Muraenidae
- Genus: Gymnothorax
- Species: G. gracilicauda

Binomial name
- Gymnothorax gracilicauda O. P. Jenkins, 1903

= Slendertail moray eel =

Species of fish

The slendertail moray eel (Gymnothorax gracilicauda) is a moray eel found in coral reefs in the Pacific Ocean. It was first named by Jenkins in 1903, and is also commonly known as the graceful-tailed moray. It is known for its elongated body and small white spots.
