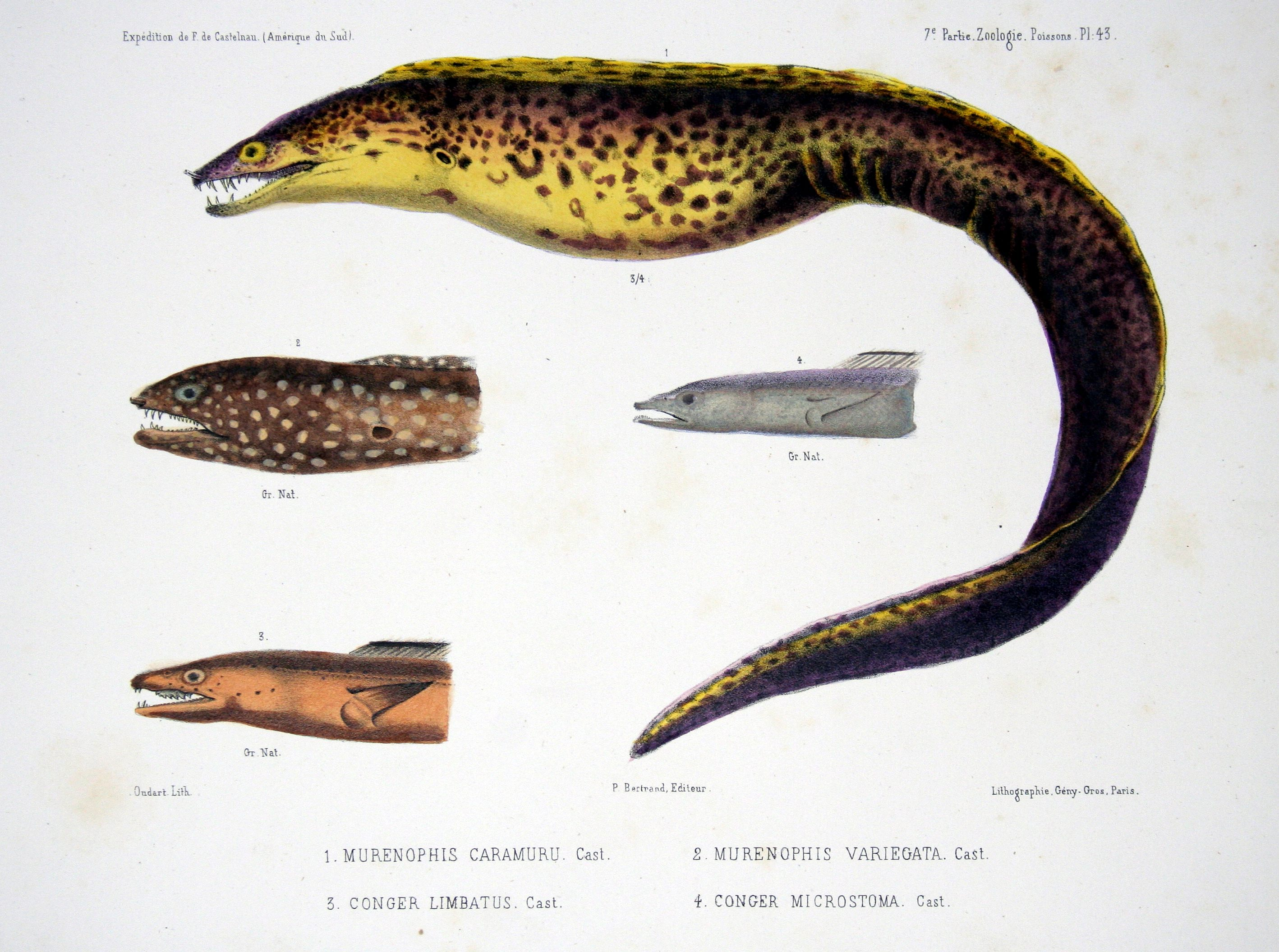

Conservation status
- Least Concern (IUCN 3.1)

Scientific classification
- Kingdom: Animalia
- Phylum: Chordata
- Class: Actinopterygii
- Order: Anguilliformes
- Family: Muraenidae
- Genus: Gymnothorax
- Species: G. ocellatus

Binomial name
- Gymnothorax ocellatus Agassiz, 1831

= Gymnothorax ocellatus =

Species of fish

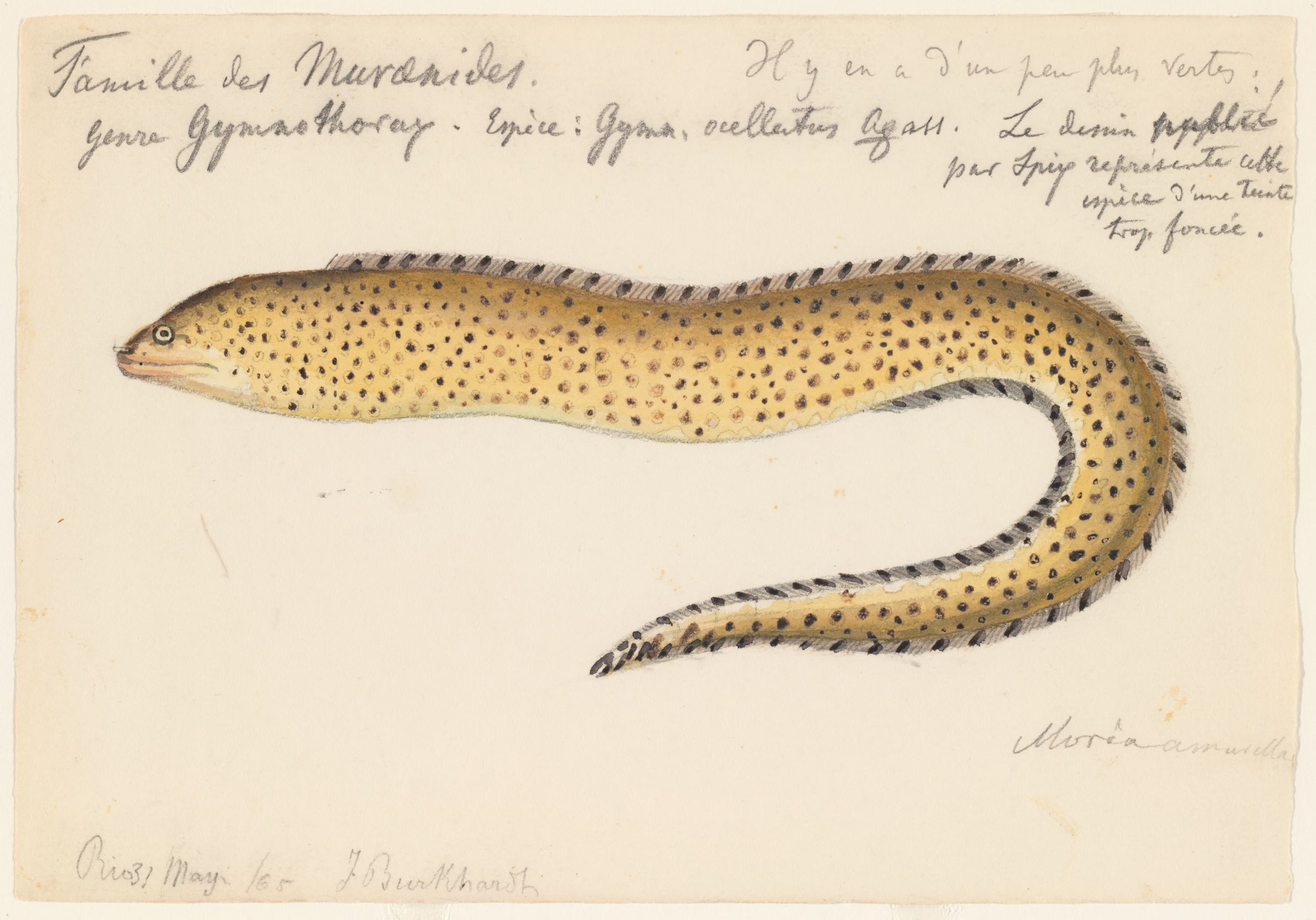
A watercolor painting of gymnothorax ocellatus from Louis Agassiz's 1856 expedition to Brazil.

Gymnothorax ocellatus is a moray eel found in coral reefs in the western Atlantic Ocean. It was first named by Louis Agassiz in 1831, and is also commonly known as the blackedge moray, Caribbean ocellated moray, conger, ocellated moray, spotted moray, sawtooth moray, white-spotted moray, or yellow cong.
