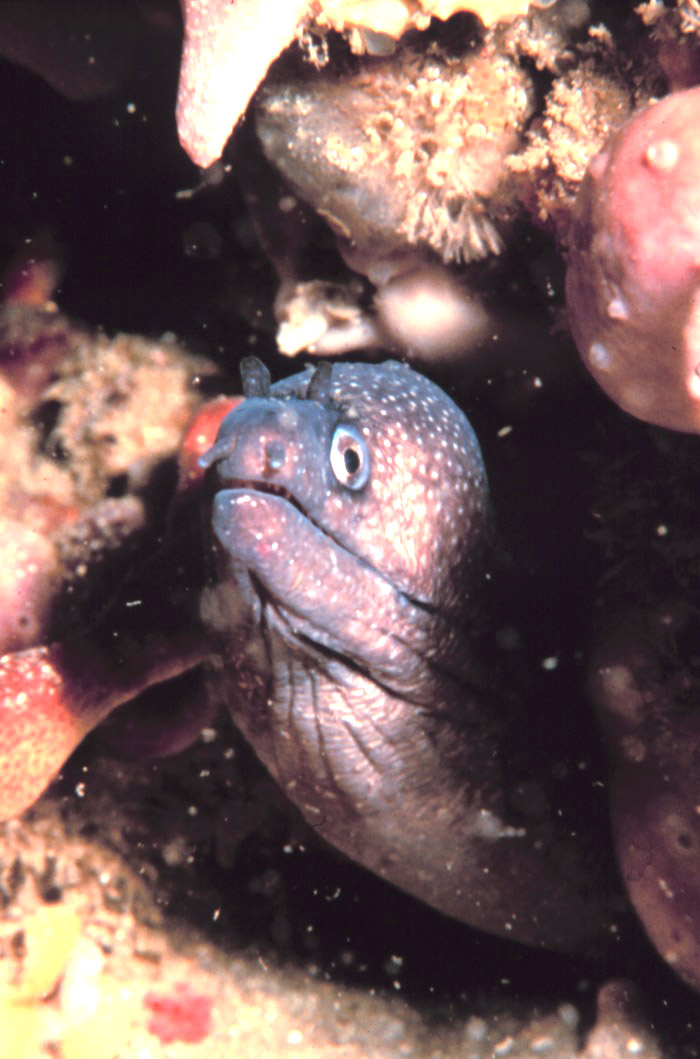

Conservation status
- Least Concern (IUCN 3.1)

Scientific classification
- Kingdom: Animalia
- Phylum: Chordata
- Class: Actinopterygii
- Order: Anguilliformes
- Family: Muraenidae
- Genus: Gymnothorax
- Species: G. polygonius

Binomial name
- Gymnothorax polygonius Poey, 1875

= Polygon moray =

Species of fish

The polygon moray (Gymnothorax polygonius) is a moray eel of the family Muraenidae, found in the eastern Atlantic from Madeira and Cape Verde, and the western central Atlantic from Cuba and the Trindade Island (Brazil), at depths down to 50 m, in coastal waters. Its length is up to 84 cm (33 in) TL.
