= South Pacific moray eel =

Conservation status
- Least Concern (IUCN 3.1)

Scientific classification
- Kingdom: Animalia
- Phylum: Chordata
- Class: Actinopterygii
- Order: Anguilliformes
- Family: Muraenidae
- Genus: Gymnothorax
- Species: G. australicola

Binomial name
- Gymnothorax australicola Lavenberg, 1992

Species of fish

The South Pacific moray (Gymnothorax australicola) is a moray eel found in the southeast and southwest Pacific Ocean. It was first named by Lavenberg in 1992.
