= Palenose moray eel =

Conservation status
- Least Concern (IUCN 3.1)

Scientific classification
- Kingdom: Animalia
- Phylum: Chordata
- Class: Actinopterygii
- Order: Anguilliformes
- Family: Muraenidae
- Genus: Gymnothorax
- Species: G. flavoculus

Binomial name
- Gymnothorax flavoculus E. B. Böhlke & J. E. Randall, 1996

Species of fish

The palenose moray (Gymnothorax flavoculus) is a moray eel found in coral reefs in the western Indian Ocean. It's a dwarf species not exceeding 11" and primarily feeds on krill in the home aquarium. With some enticing, they have taken other food, like smaller mussels. Its mouth is so small you shouldn't risk feeding it live food with claws like emerald crabs or spear shrimp. It was first named by Eugenia B. Böhlke and John E. Randall in 1996.
