= Gymnothorax odishi =

Scientific classification
- Kingdom: Animalia
- Phylum: Chordata
- Class: Actinopterygii
- Order: Anguilliformes
- Family: Muraenidae
- Genus: Gymnothorax
- Species: G. odishi

Binomial name
- Gymnothorax odishi Mohapatra, Mohanty, Smith, Mishra & Roy, 2018

Species of fish

Gymnothorax odishi is a species of fish from the genus Gymnothorax. Nearly a dozen specimens were caught off India's east coast. The species is distinguishable due to its dark-rimmed jaw pores, brown color, a little dark blotch situated at the back of the eye, and dark-rimmed gill openings. The species has around 133–138 vertebrae.
