= Flores mud moray =

Scientific classification
- Kingdom: Animalia
- Phylum: Chordata
- Class: Actinopterygii
- Order: Anguilliformes
- Family: Muraenidae
- Genus: Gymnothorax
- Species: G. davidsmithi

Binomial name
- Gymnothorax davidsmithi McCosker & Randall, 2008

Species of fish

The Flores mud moray (Gymnothorax davidsmithi) is an eel in the family Muraenidae (moray eels). It was described by John E. McCosker and John Ernest Randall in 2008. It is a tropical, marine eel which is known from Indonesia, in the western Pacific Ocean. It is known to dwell at a depth range of 3–4 m. Males can reach a maximum total length of 29.9 cm.

The species epithet refers to David G. Smith, in honour of his contributions towards knowledge of eels.
