= Gymnothorax mucifer =

Scientific classification
- Kingdom: Animalia
- Phylum: Chordata
- Class: Actinopterygii
- Order: Anguilliformes
- Family: Muraenidae
- Genus: Gymnothorax
- Species: G. mucifer

Binomial name
- Gymnothorax mucifer Snyder, 1904

Species of fish

Gymnothorax mucifer is a species of moray eel found in the Pacific Ocean. It was first named by John Otterbein Snyder in 1904, and can measure up to approximately 66 centimetres in length.
