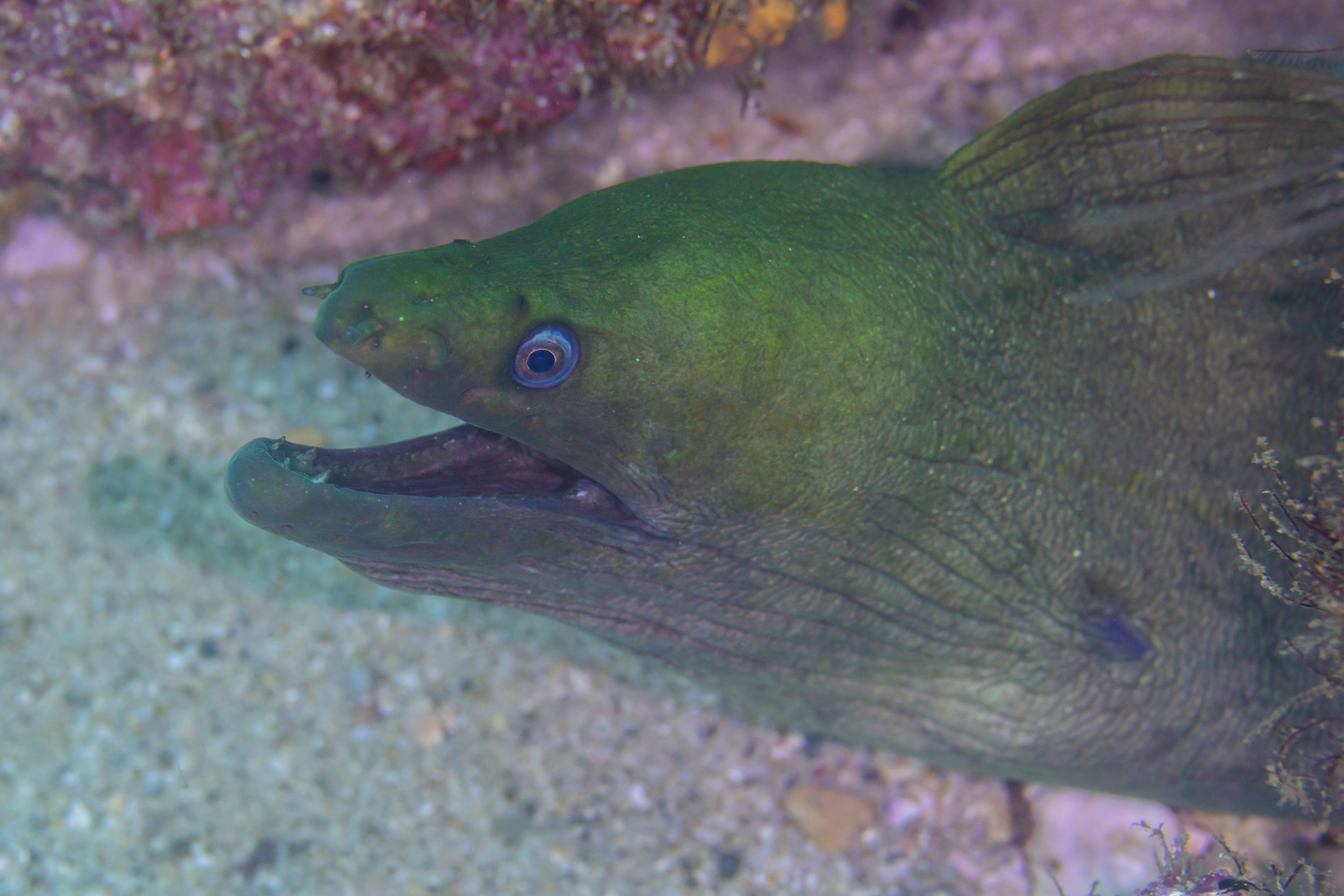

Conservation status
- Least Concern (IUCN 3.1)

Scientific classification
- Kingdom: Animalia
- Phylum: Chordata
- Class: Actinopterygii
- Order: Anguilliformes
- Family: Muraenidae
- Genus: Gymnothorax
- Species: G. castaneus

Binomial name
- Gymnothorax castaneus (D. S. Jordan & C. H. Gilbert, 1883)

= Panamic green moray eel =

Species of fish

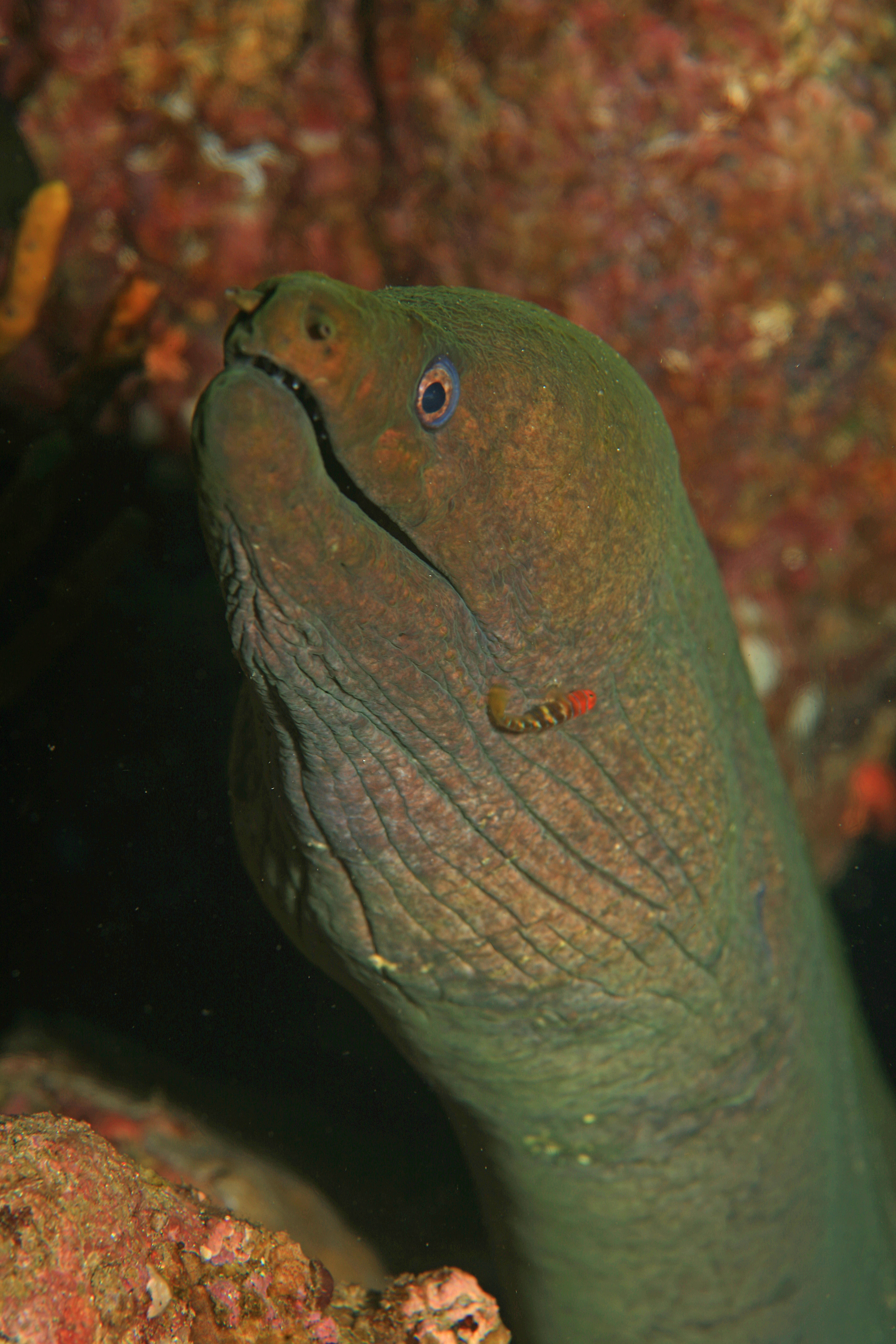

The panamic green moray eel (Gymnothorax castaneus) is a large moray eel in the Pacific. Common names also include chestnut moray eel.

The panamic green moray is found in the Pacific from the Gulf of California to Ecuador, including the Galapagos Islands. It grows to about 1.5 m (4 ft 11 in) in length, and is brown to brownish green. It is found near reefs and associated waters between 3 and 36 m (10 and 120 ft) deep.
