= Gymnothorax pseudomelanosomatus =

Scientific classification
- Kingdom: Animalia
- Phylum: Chordata
- Class: Actinopterygii
- Order: Anguilliformes
- Family: Muraenidae
- Genus: Gymnothorax
- Species: G. pseudomelanosomatus

Binomial name
- Gymnothorax pseudomelanosomatus Loh, Shao & Chen, 2015

Species of fish

Gymnothorax pseudomelanosomatus is a species of fish from the Gymnothorax genus native to Taiwan in the Pacific. It has a long and plain body with fawn colored fins. One captured specimen had a maximum length of 67.5 cm (26.6 in).
