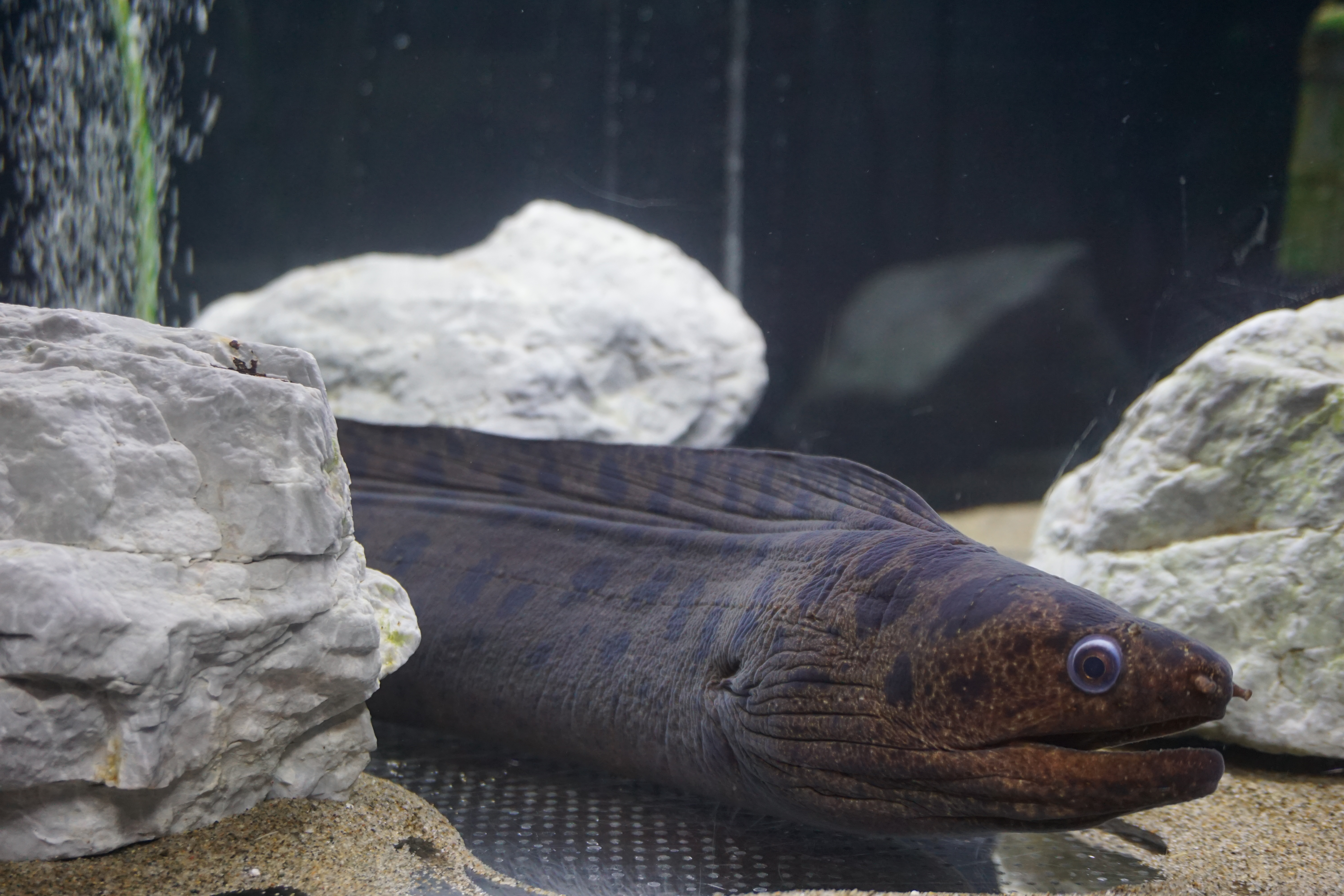

Scientific classification
- Kingdom: Animalia
- Phylum: Chordata
- Class: Actinopterygii
- Order: Anguilliformes
- Family: Muraenidae
- Genus: Gymnothorax
- Species: G. reevesii

Binomial name
- Gymnothorax reevesii (J. Richardson, 1845)

= Reeve's moray =

Reeves's moray

Species of fish

Reeves's moray (Gymnothorax reevesii) is a moray eel of the family Muraenidae. Its length is up to 60 cm.
