= Gymnothorax visakhaensis =

Scientific classification
- Domain: Eukaryota
- Kingdom: Animalia
- Phylum: Chordata
- Class: Actinopterygii
- Order: Anguilliformes
- Family: Muraenidae
- Genus: Gymnothorax
- Species: G. visakhaensis

Binomial name
- Gymnothorax visakhaensis Mohapatra, Smith, Mohanty, Mishra & Tudu, 2017

Species of fish

Gymnothorax visakhaensis is a species of fish native to India. It has a maximum length of 31.1 cm (12.2 in). This long, brown fish has a dull snout and 163-169 vertebrae.
