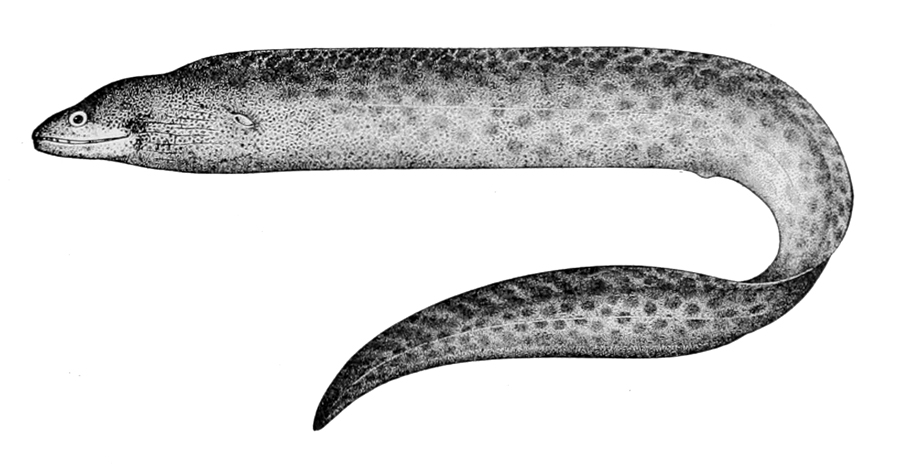

Conservation status
- Least Concern (IUCN 3.1)

Scientific classification
- Kingdom: Animalia
- Phylum: Chordata
- Class: Actinopterygii
- Order: Anguilliformes
- Family: Muraenidae
- Genus: Gymnothorax
- Species: G. philippinus

Binomial name
- Gymnothorax philippinus D. S. Jordan & Seale, 1907

= Gymnothorax philippinus =

Species of fish

Gymnothorax philippinus is a moray eel found in the western Pacific Ocean around the Ryukyu Islands and the Philippines. It was first named by Jordan and Seale in 1907, and reaches a maximum length of 60 cm.
