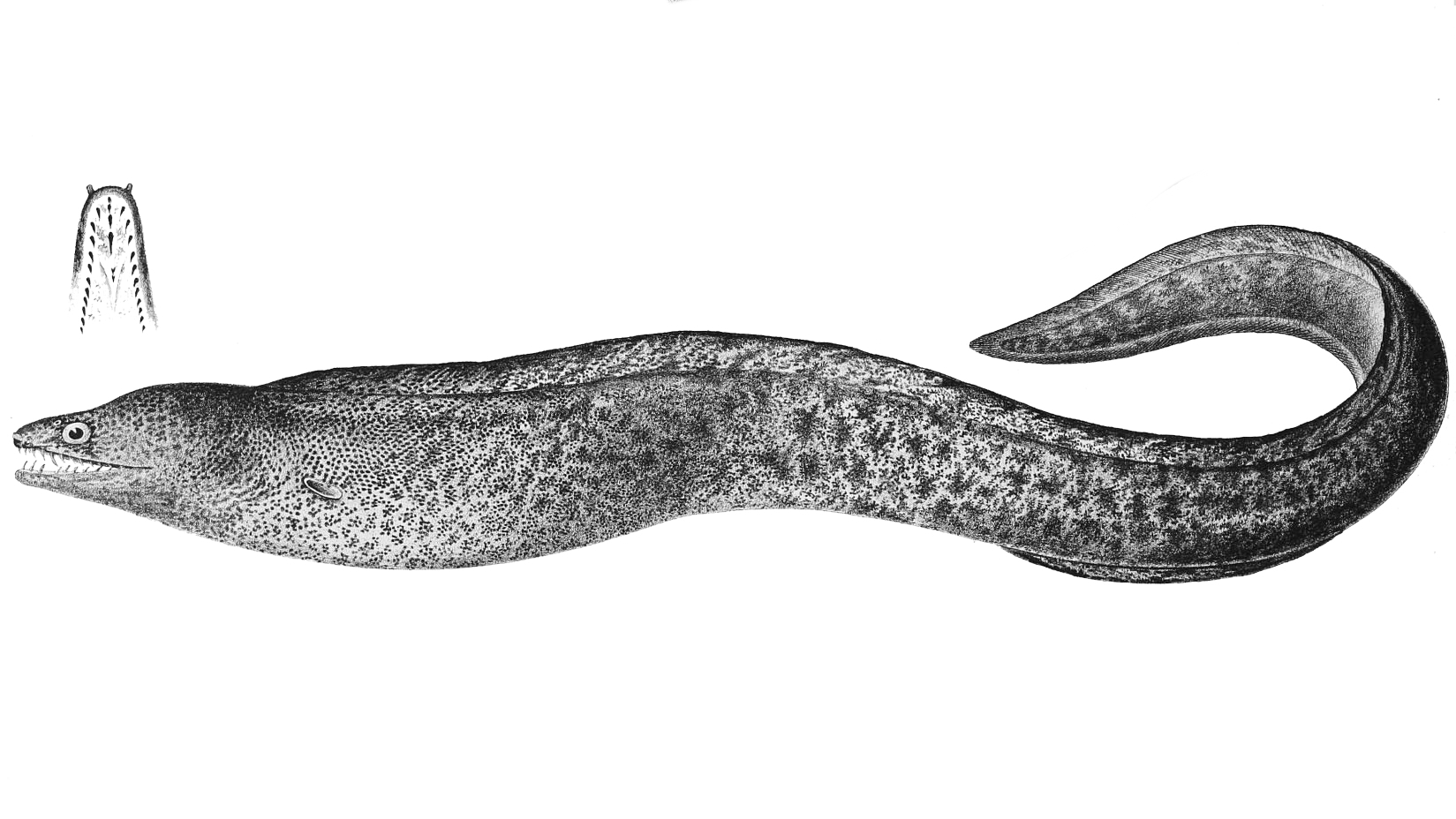

Scientific classification
- Kingdom: Animalia
- Phylum: Chordata
- Class: Actinopterygii
- Order: Anguilliformes
- Family: Muraenidae
- Genus: Gymnothorax
- Species: G. pseudothyrsoideus

Binomial name
- Gymnothorax pseudothyrsoideus (Bleeker, 1852)

= Gymnothorax pseudothyrsoideus =

Species of fish

Gymnothorax pseudothyrsoideus is a moray eel found in the Pacific and Indian Oceans. It was first named by Pieter Bleeker in 1852, and is commonly known as the highfin moray, false spotted moray, mottled moray-eel, or the yellow-lined reef-eel.

== Description ==
Gymnothorax pseudothyrsoideus can grow to 80 cm in length and has no visible dorsal fins. Its coloration is pale yellow with dark brown spots that are irregularly distributed across its body. The young have white along the margins of their fins, but as they mature the white fades to only the tip of the tail.

== Endangerment Status ==
Though the species has not been specifically evaluated to determine the amount of threat of extinction, it is known that the species is neither commonly seen nor very widespread in its habitat distribution. However, since the species is not commercially desirable for any purpose nor harmful to humans in any way, it is unlikely that direct human interference will affect the population.
