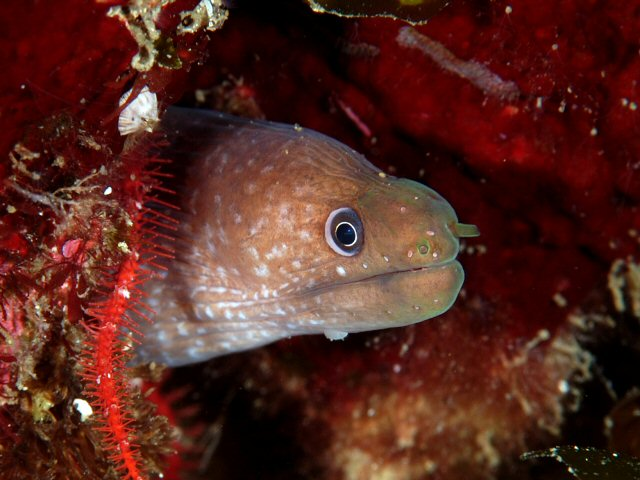

Conservation status
- Data Deficient (IUCN 3.1)

Scientific classification
- Kingdom: Animalia
- Phylum: Chordata
- Class: Actinopterygii
- Order: Anguilliformes
- Family: Muraenidae
- Genus: Gymnothorax
- Species: G. bacalladoi

Binomial name
- Gymnothorax bacalladoi E. B. Böhlke & Brito, 1987

= Canary moray =

Species of fish

The Canary moray (Gymnothorax bacalladoi) is a moray eel of the family Muraenidae, found only around the Canary Islands (Spain) in the northern Atlantic, at depths between 17 and 605 m (56 and 1,985 ft). Its length is up to 35 cm (14 in).
