= Gymnothorax neglectus =

Conservation status
- Least Concern (IUCN 3.1)

Scientific classification
- Kingdom: Animalia
- Phylum: Chordata
- Class: Actinopterygii
- Order: Anguilliformes
- Family: Muraenidae
- Genus: Gymnothorax
- Species: G. neglectus

Binomial name
- Gymnothorax neglectus S. Tanaka (I), 1911

Species of eel

Gymnothorax neglectus is a moray eel found in the northwest Pacific Ocean, around Taiwan and Japan. It was first named by Shigeho Tanaka in 1911. It reaches a maximum length of about 120 centimetres (47 in).
