= Gymnothorax mishrai =

Scientific classification
- Domain: Eukaryota
- Kingdom: Animalia
- Phylum: Chordata
- Class: Actinopterygii
- Order: Anguilliformes
- Family: Muraenidae
- Genus: Gymnothorax
- Species: G. mishrai

Binomial name
- Gymnothorax mishrai Ray, Mohapatra & Smith, 2015

Species of fish

Gymnothorax mishrai is a species of fish from the moray eel family. A single specimen was used to describe the species. It measured a total of 324 mm (12.8 in). The specimen was caught off the Bay of Bengal in India. The species is brown in color and plain, they also have brown-rimmed jaw pores and 134 vertebrae.
