= Gymnothorax elaineheemstrae =

Scientific classification
- Kingdom: Animalia
- Phylum: Chordata
- Class: Actinopterygii
- Order: Anguilliformes
- Family: Muraenidae
- Genus: Gymnothorax
- Species: G. elaineheemstrae

Binomial name
- Gymnothorax elaineheemstrae Sithole, Smith, Mwale & Gouws, 2020

Species of fish

Gymnothorax elaineheemstrae is a fish in the family Muraenidae.

The eel is named in honor of Elaine Heemstra of the South African Institute for Aquatic Biodiversity.
