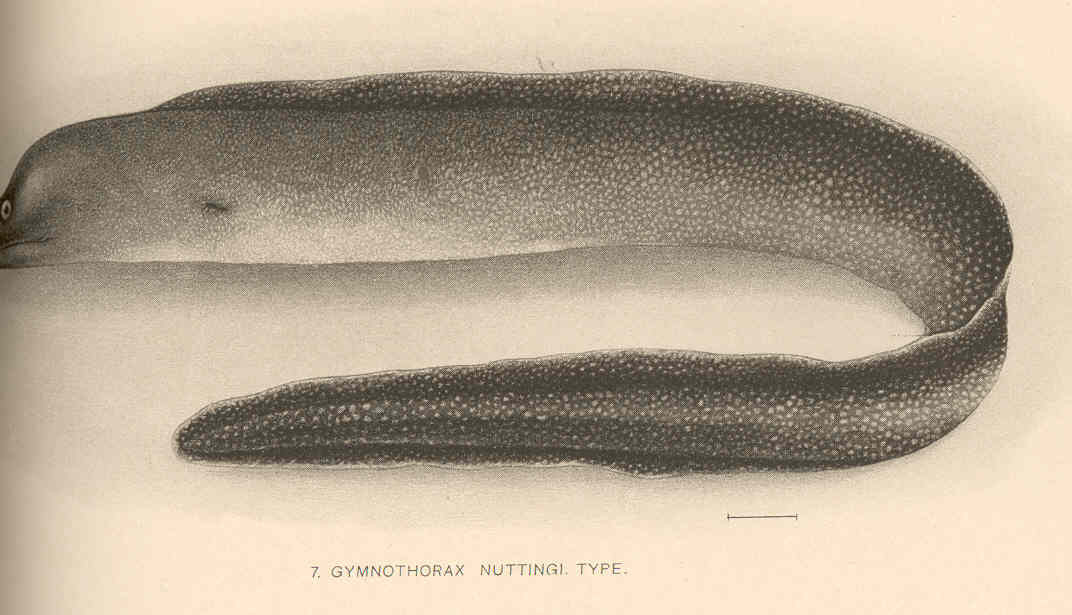

Conservation status
- Least Concern (IUCN 3.1)

Scientific classification
- Kingdom: Animalia
- Phylum: Chordata
- Class: Actinopterygii
- Order: Anguilliformes
- Family: Muraenidae
- Genus: Gymnothorax
- Species: G. nuttingi

Binomial name
- Gymnothorax nuttingi Snyder, 1904

= Gymnothorax nuttingi =

Species of fish

Gymnothorax nuttingi, or Nutting's moray, is a moray eel found in the eastern central Pacific Ocean around Hawaii.
