= Gymnothorax pseudotile =

Scientific classification
- Domain: Eukaryota
- Kingdom: Animalia
- Phylum: Chordata
- Class: Actinopterygii
- Order: Anguilliformes
- Family: Muraenidae
- Genus: Gymnothorax
- Species: G. pseudotile

Binomial name
- Gymnothorax pseudotile Mohapatra, Smith, Ray, Mishra & Mohanty, 2017

Species of fish

Gymnothorax pseudotile is a species of fish found in West Bengal, India. It is powerfully built and has a maximum length of 47 cm (19 in). It has big eyes, a dull snout, and an elongated body. They have 126–129 vertebrae.
