= Gymnothorax sagmacephalus =

Conservation status
- Data Deficient (IUCN 3.1)

Scientific classification
- Kingdom: Animalia
- Phylum: Chordata
- Class: Actinopterygii
- Order: Anguilliformes
- Family: Muraenidae
- Genus: Gymnothorax
- Species: G. sagmacephalus

Binomial name
- Gymnothorax sagmacephalus E. B. Böhlke, 1997

Species of fish

Gymnothorax sagmacephalus is a moray eel found in the northwest Pacific Ocean, around Japan. It was first named by Eugenia Brandt Böhlke in 1997, and can reach a maximum length of about 53 cm.
