= Gymnothorax niphostigmus =

Conservation status
- Least Concern (IUCN 3.1)

Scientific classification
- Kingdom: Animalia
- Phylum: Chordata
- Class: Actinopterygii
- Order: Anguilliformes
- Family: Muraenidae
- Genus: Gymnothorax
- Species: G. niphostigmus

Binomial name
- Gymnothorax niphostigmus H. M. Chen, K. T. Shao & C. T. Chen, 1996

Species of fish

Gymnothorax niphostigmus, the snowflake-patched moray, is a moray eel found in the northwest Pacific Ocean around Taiwan. It was first named by Chen, Shao, and Chen in 1996.
