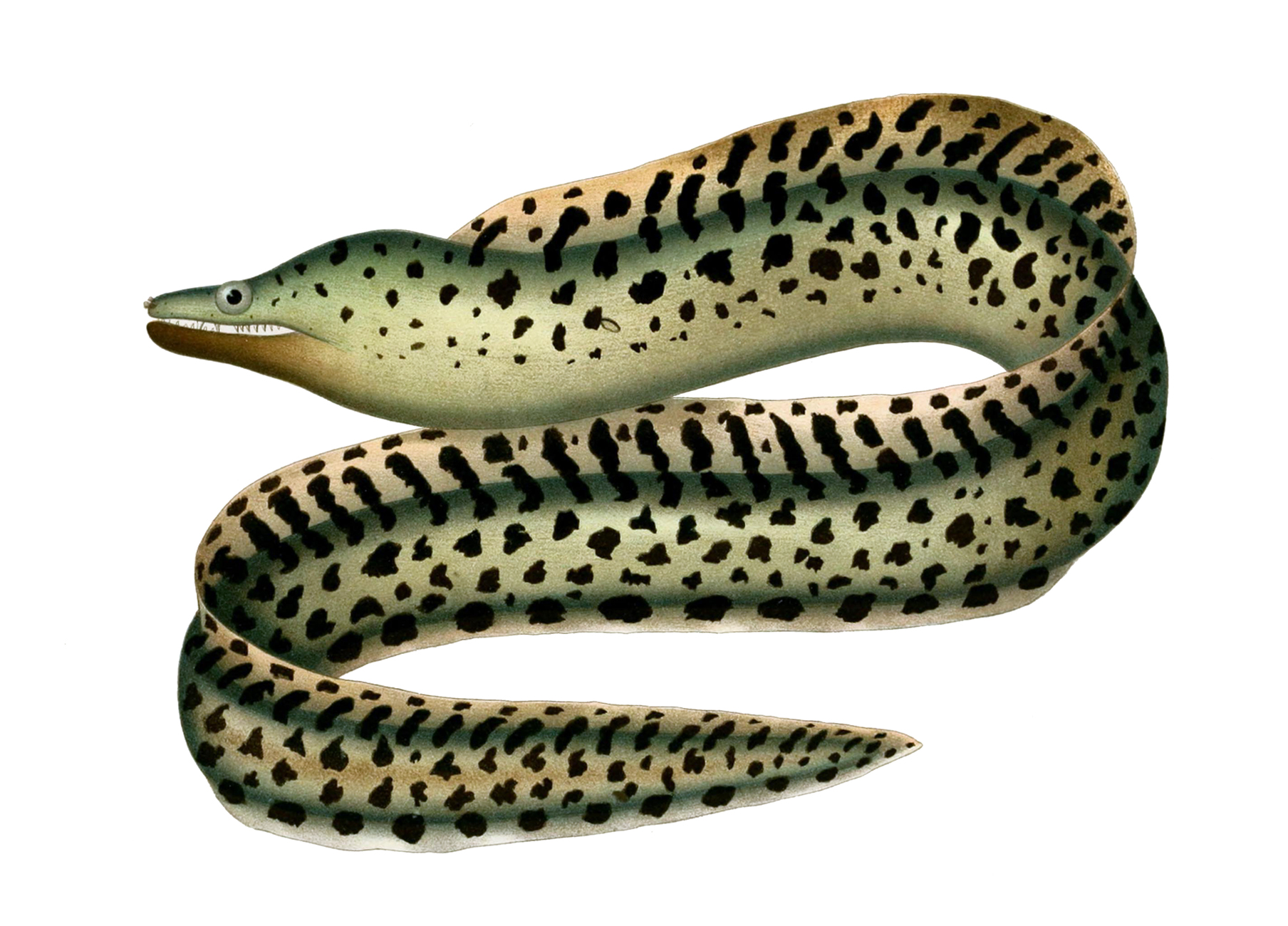

Conservation status
- Least Concern (IUCN 3.1)

Scientific classification
- Kingdom: Animalia
- Phylum: Chordata
- Class: Actinopterygii
- Order: Anguilliformes
- Family: Muraenidae
- Genus: Gymnothorax
- Species: G. afer

Binomial name
- Gymnothorax afer Bloch, 1795

= Dark moray eel =

Species of fish

The dark moray eel (Gymnothorax afer) is a moray eel found in the eastern Atlantic Ocean, from Mauritania to Cape Frio, Namibia. It was first named by Marcus Elieser Bloch in 1795.
