= Lesser moray eel =

Conservation status
- Least Concern (IUCN 3.1)

Scientific classification
- Kingdom: Animalia
- Phylum: Chordata
- Class: Actinopterygii
- Division: Teleostei
- Order: Anguilliformes
- Family: Muraenidae
- Genus: Gymnothorax
- Species: G. minor

Binomial name
- Gymnothorax minor (Temminck & Schlegel, 1846)

Species of fish

The lesser moray (Gymnothorax minor) is a moray eel found in the western Pacific Ocean. It was first named by Coenraad Jacob Temminck and Hermann Schlegel in 1846, and is also known as the reticulated moray eel.
