= Gymnothorax serratidens =

Conservation status
- Data Deficient (IUCN 3.1)

Scientific classification
- Kingdom: Animalia
- Phylum: Chordata
- Class: Actinopterygii
- Order: Anguilliformes
- Family: Muraenidae
- Genus: Gymnothorax
- Species: G. serratidens

Binomial name
- Gymnothorax serratidens (Hildebrand & F. O. Barton, 1949)

Species of fish

Gymnothorax serratidens is a moray eel found in the southeast Pacific Ocean around Peru. It was first named by Hildebrand and Barton in 1949.
