= Gymnothorax phasmatodes =

Conservation status
- Least Concern (IUCN 3.1)

Scientific classification
- Kingdom: Animalia
- Phylum: Chordata
- Class: Actinopterygii
- Order: Anguilliformes
- Family: Muraenidae
- Genus: Gymnothorax
- Species: G. phasmatodes

Binomial name
- Gymnothorax phasmatodes (J. L. B. Smith, 1962)

Species of fish

Gymnothorax phasmatodes, the ghost moray, or ghost moray eel, is a moray eel found in the western Indian Ocean.
