= Gymnothorax hansi =

Conservation status
- Data Deficient (IUCN 3.1)

Scientific classification
- Kingdom: Animalia
- Phylum: Chordata
- Class: Actinopterygii
- Order: Anguilliformes
- Family: Muraenidae
- Genus: Gymnothorax
- Species: G. hansi

Binomial name
- Gymnothorax hansi Heemstra, 2004

Species of fish

Gymnothorax hansi is an eel in the family Muraenidae (moray eels). It was described by Phil Heemstra in 2004. It is a tropical, marine eel which is known from reefs around Grand Comoro Island, in the Indian Ocean. It is known to dwell at a maximum depth of 143 m (469 ft).
