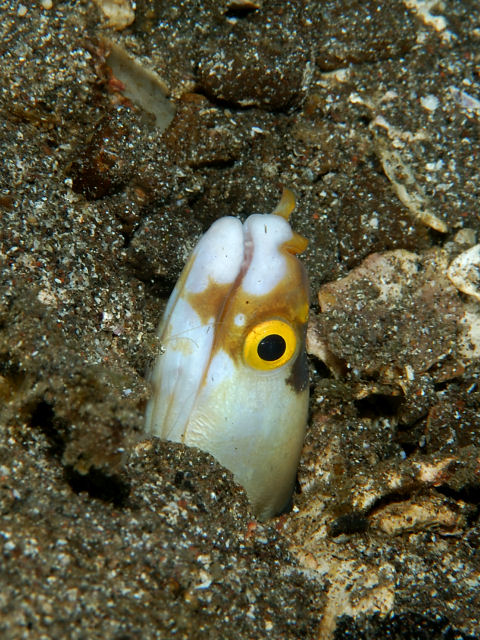

Conservation status
- Least Concern (IUCN 3.1)

Scientific classification
- Kingdom: Animalia
- Phylum: Chordata
- Class: Actinopterygii
- Division: Teleostei
- Order: Anguilliformes
- Family: Muraenidae
- Genus: Gymnothorax
- Species: G. albimarginatus

Binomial name
- Gymnothorax albimarginatus (Temminck & Schlegel, 1846)

= Whitemargin moray eel =

Species of fish

The whitemargin moray or the white-edged moray, Gymnothorax albimarginatus, is a species of marine fish in the family Muraenidae.

== Description ==
The whitemargin moray is considered as a medium-sized fish which can reach 105 cm long. Its snout is rounded. Its body coloration can vary off-white to beige with a characteristic white margin on the outer edge of the dorsal fin that runs through its body from the back of the skull to the tip of the tail.

== Distribution & habitat ==
The whitemargin moray is widespread throughout the tropical waters of Indo-Pacific area from the eastern part of Indonesia to the oceanic islands in the Ocean Pacific, including Hawaii and Polynesia; and from South Japan down to Tonga Islands.

This moray lives on the sandy slopes of the coastal reefs.

== Biology ==
The whitemargin moray is a benthic animal that lives during daytime buried in the sand or between coral blocs and comes out the evening to hunt prey. Its bite is venomous.
