= Woodward's moray eel =

Scientific classification
- Kingdom: Animalia
- Phylum: Chordata
- Class: Actinopterygii
- Order: Anguilliformes
- Family: Muraenidae
- Genus: Gymnothorax
- Species: G. woodwardi

Binomial name
- Gymnothorax woodwardi (McCulloch, 1912)

Species of fish

Woodward's moray, Gymnothorax woodwardi, is a moray eel found in coral reefs in the Indian Ocean, around Australia. It was first named by McCulloch in 1912.
