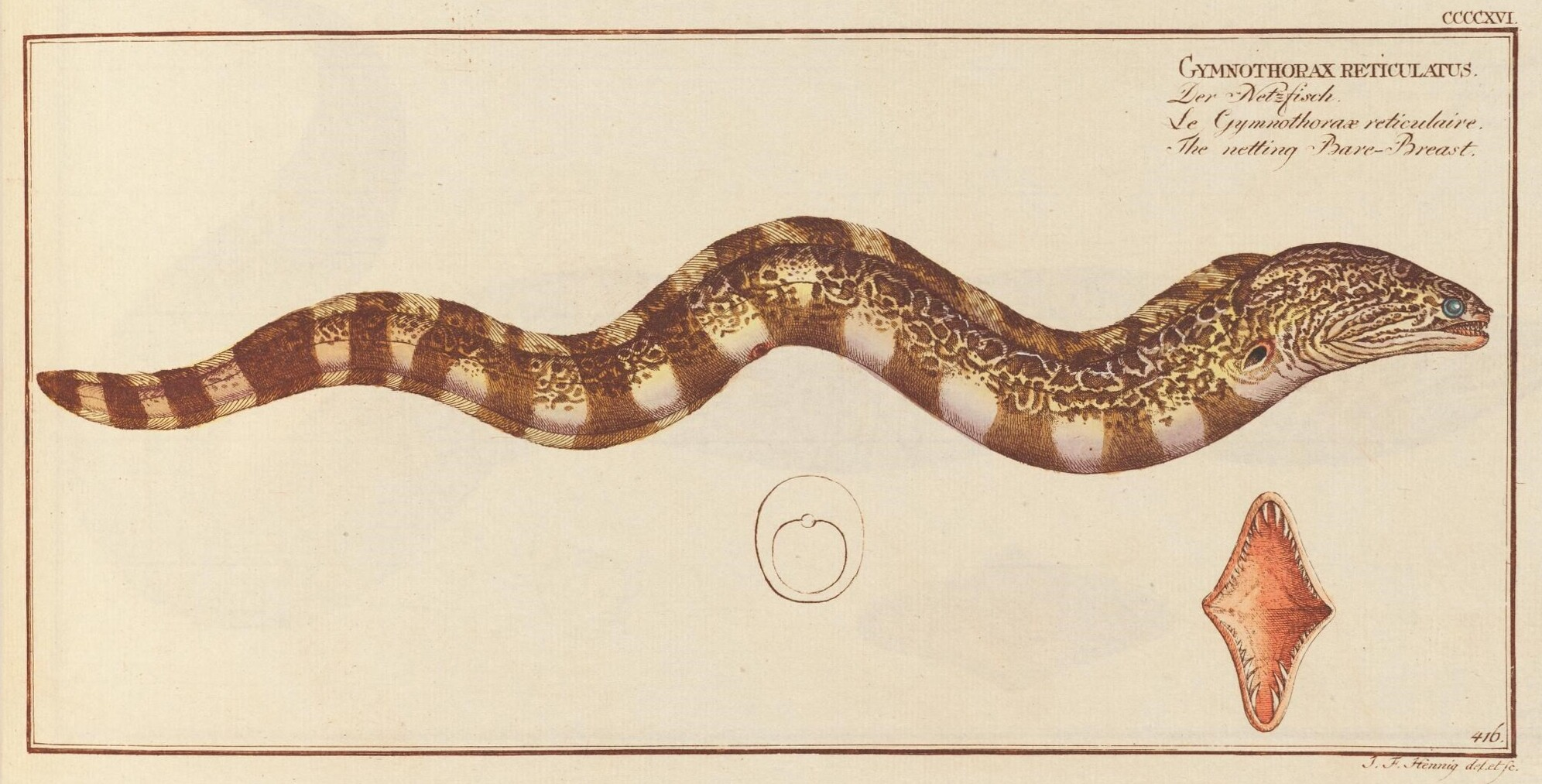

Scientific classification
- Domain: Eukaryota
- Kingdom: Animalia
- Phylum: Chordata
- Class: Actinopterygii
- Order: Anguilliformes
- Family: Muraenidae
- Genus: Gymnothorax
- Species: G. reticularis

Binomial name
- Gymnothorax reticularis Bloch, 1795

= Gymnothorax reticularis =

Species of fish

Gymnothorax reticularis is a moray eel found in the western Pacific and Indian Oceans. A single specimen was reported in 2013 in the Mediterranean Sea off Israel. It was first named by Marcus Elieser Bloch in 1795, and is commonly known as the dusky-banded moray, reticulated moray, net moray, or the spotted moray.
