= Gymnothorax sokotrensis =

Conservation status
- Data Deficient (IUCN 3.1)

Scientific classification
- Kingdom: Animalia
- Phylum: Chordata
- Class: Actinopterygii
- Order: Anguilliformes
- Family: Muraenidae
- Genus: Gymnothorax
- Species: G. sokotrensis

Binomial name
- Gymnothorax sokotrensis Kotthaus, 1968

Species of fish

Gymnothorax sokotrensis is a moray eel found in the western Indian Ocean, around Yemen. It was first named by Kotthaus in 1968.
