= Gymnothorax baranesi =

Conservation status
- Least Concern (IUCN 3.1)

Scientific classification
- Kingdom: Animalia
- Phylum: Chordata
- Class: Actinopterygii
- Order: Anguilliformes
- Family: Muraenidae
- Genus: Gymnothorax
- Species: G. baranesi

Binomial name
- Gymnothorax baranesi D. G. Smith, Brokovich & Einbinder, 2008

Species of fish

Gymnothorax baranesi is a moray eel found in the western Indian Ocean, around the Gulf of Aqaba, Israel, and the Red Sea. It was first named by D.G. Smith, E. Brokovich, and S. Einbinder in 2008.
