= Gymnothorax polyspondylus =

Conservation status
- Data Deficient (IUCN 3.1)

Scientific classification
- Kingdom: Animalia
- Phylum: Chordata
- Class: Actinopterygii
- Order: Anguilliformes
- Family: Muraenidae
- Genus: Gymnothorax
- Species: G. polyspondylus

Binomial name
- Gymnothorax polyspondylus E. B. Böhlke & J. E. Randall, 2000

Species of fish

Gymnothorax polyspondylus is a moray eel found in the eastern central Pacific, around Hawaii. It was first named by E.B. Böhlke and J.E. Randall in 2000, and is commonly known as the manyvertebrae moray.
