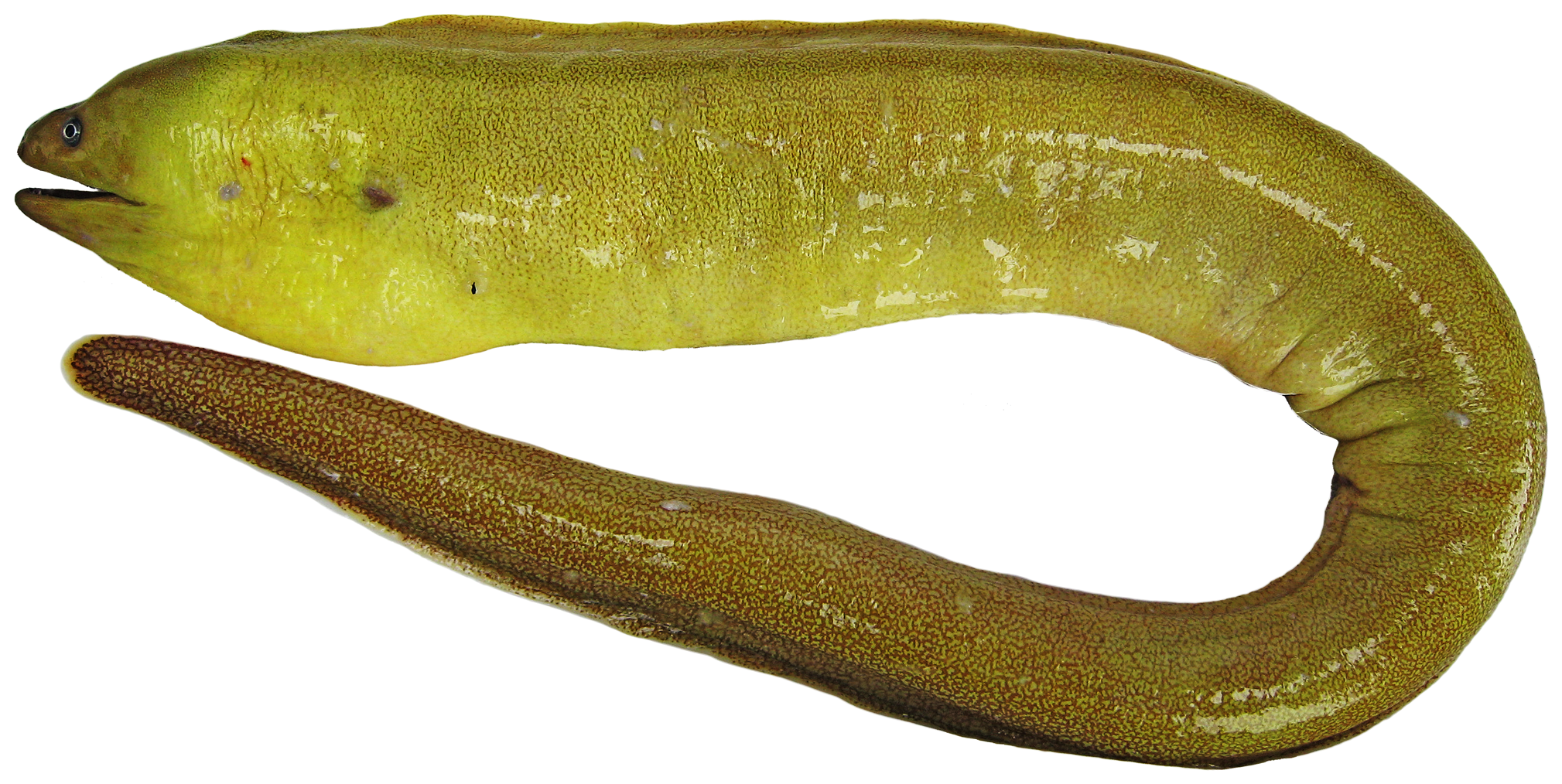
- Gymnothorax maderensis
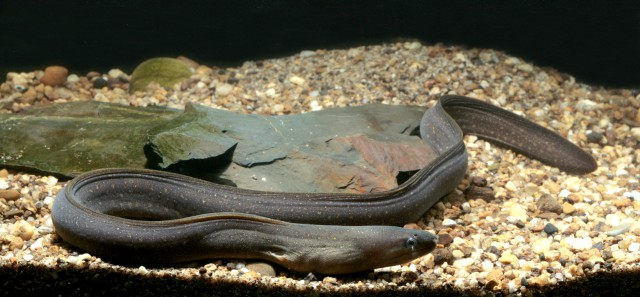
- Gymnothorax tile

Scientific classification
- Kingdom: Animalia
- Phylum: Chordata
- Class: Actinopterygii
- Order: Anguilliformes
- Family: Muraenidae
- Subfamily: Muraeninae
- Genus: Gymnothorax; Bloch, 1795

Type species
- Gymnothorax reticularis Bloch, 1795

= Gymnothorax =

Genus of ray-finned fish

Gymnothorax is a genus of fish in the family Muraenidae found in Atlantic, Indian, and Pacific Oceans. With more than 120 species, it the most speciose genus of moray eels.

Gymnothorax as currently recognized is polyphyletic, and comparative studies are needed before action is taken to resurrect generic synonyms of Gymnothorax.

== Description ==
Species in this genus are slender (most skinny one being Gymnothorax gracilicauda) as are most eels. They grow to 6–8 ft (1.8–2.4 m). On the opposite end of the spectrum, some species only grow to a maximum size of less than 20 cm (7.9 in). Many species have complex patterns, but many others are quite bland without much coloration on their bodies. Moray eel species, inevitably applying to Gymnothorax owing to its high diversity, are often found in generally shallow-water habitats, but many species are also found in deep water, being more common in those environments than previously thought.

Like all moray eels, they have pharyngeal jaws.

== Species ==
Both FishBase and World Register of Marine Species recognize a total of 128 valid species in the genus. However, each database includes three species that the other does not list, which are noted in the list below.

- Gymnothorax afer Bloch, 1795 (Dark moray)
- Gymnothorax albimarginatus (Temminck & Schlegel, 1846) (White-margin moray)
- Gymnothorax andamanensis Mohapatra, Kiruba-Sankar, Praveenraj & Mohanty, 2019
- Gymnothorax angusticauda (M. C. W. Weber & de Beaufort, 1916) (Narrow-tail moray)
- Gymnothorax angusticeps (Hildebrand & F. O. Barton, 1949)
- Gymnothorax annasona Whitley, 1937 (Lord Howe Island moray)
- Gymnothorax annulatus D. G. Smith & E. B. Böhlke, 1997 (Ringed moray)
- Gymnothorax arabicus D. G. Smith, Bogorodsky, Dandar & Zajonz, 2024
- Gymnothorax atolli (Pietschmann, 1935) (Atoll moray)
- Gymnothorax aurocephalus Nashad, Mohapatra, Varghese & Bineesh, 2020 (Goldenhead moray)
- Gymnothorax australicola Lavenberg, 1992 (South Pacific moray)
- Gymnothorax austrinus E. B. Böhlke & McCosker, 2001 (Southern moray)
- Gymnothorax bacalladoi E. B. Böhlke & Brito, 1987 (Canary moray)
- Gymnothorax baranesi D. G. Smith, Brokovich & Einbinder, 2008
- Gymnothorax bathyphilus J. E. Randall & McCosker, 1975 (Deep-dwelling moray)
- Gymnothorax berndti Snyder, 1904 (Y-patterned moray)
- Gymnothorax breedeni McCosker & J. E. Randall, 1977 (Black-cheek moray)
- Gymnothorax buroensis (Bleeker, 1857) (Vagrant moray)
- Gymnothorax castaneus (D. S. Jordan & C. H. Gilbert, 1883) (Panamic green moray)
- Gymnothorax castlei E. B. Böhlke & J. E. Randall, 1999 (Castle's moray)
- Gymnothorax cephalospilus E. B. Böhlke & McCosker, 2001 (Head-spot moray)
- Gymnothorax chilospilus Bleeker, 1864 (Lip-spot moray)
- Gymnothorax chlamydatus Snyder, 1908 (Banded mud moray)
- Gymnothorax cinerascens (Rüppell, 1830) (Plain moray)
- Gymnothorax conspersus Poey, 1867 (Saddled moray)
- Gymnothorax cribroris Whitley, 1932 (Sieve-patterned moray)
- Gymnothorax davidsmithi McCosker & J. E. Randall, 2008 (Flores mud moray)
- Gymnothorax dorsalis Seale, 1917
- Gymnothorax dovii (Günther, 1870) (Fine-spotted moray)
- Gymnothorax elaineheemstrae Sithole, Smith, Mwale & Gouws, 2020
- Gymnothorax elegans Bliss, 1883 (Elegant moray)
- Gymnothorax emmae Prokofiev, 2010
- Gymnothorax enigmaticus McCosker & J. E. Randall, 1982 (Enigmatic moray)
- Gymnothorax equatorialis (Hildebrand, 1946) (Spot-tail moray)
- Gymnothorax eurostus (C. C. Abbott, 1860) (Abbott's moray)
- Gymnothorax eurygnathos E. B. Böhlke, 2001
- Gymnothorax favagineus Bloch & J. G. Schneider, 1801 (Laced moray)
- Gymnothorax fimbriatus (E. T. Bennett, 1832) (Fimbriated moray)
- Gymnothorax flavimarginatus (Rüppell, 1830) (Yellow-edged moray)
- Gymnothorax flavoculus (E. B. Böhlke & J. E. Randall, 1996) (Pale-nose moray)
- Gymnothorax formosus Bleeker, 1864
- Gymnothorax funebris Ranzani, 1839 (Green moray)
- Gymnothorax fuscomaculatus (L. P. Schultz, 1953) (Brown-spotted moray)
- Gymnothorax gracilicauda O. P. Jenkins, 1903 (Slender-tail moray)
- Gymnothorax griseus (Lacépède, 1803) (Geometric moray)
- Gymnothorax hansi Heemstra, 2004
- Gymnothorax hepaticus (Rüppell, 1830) (Liver-colored moray)
- Gymnothorax herrei Beebe & Tee-Van, 1933 (Herre's moray)
- Gymnothorax hubbsi J. E. Böhlke & E. B. Böhlke, 1977 (Lichen moray)
- Gymnothorax indicus Mohapatra, D. Ray, D. G. Smith & Mishra, 2016 (Indian unpatterened moray)
- Gymnothorax intesi (Fourmanoir & Rivaton, 1979) (White-tip moray)
- Gymnothorax isingteena (J. Richardson, 1845) (Indo-Pacific spotted moray)
- Gymnothorax javanicus (Bleeker, 1859) (Giant moray)
- Gymnothorax johnsoni (J. L. B. Smith, 1962) (White-spotted moray)
- Gymnothorax kidako (Temminck & Schlegel, 1846) (Kidako moray)
- Gymnothorax kolpos J. E. Böhlke & E. B. Böhlke, 1980 (Black-tail moray)
- Gymnothorax kontodontos E. B. Böhlke, 2000 (Short-tooth moray)
- Gymnothorax longinquus (Whitley, 1948)
- Gymnothorax maderensis (J. Y. Johnson, 1862) (Shark-tooth moray)
- Gymnothorax mareei Poll, 1953 (Spot-jaw moray)
- Gymnothorax margaritophorus Bleeker, 1864 (Blotch-necked moray)
- Gymnothorax marshallensis (L. P. Schultz, 1953) (Marshall Islands moray)
- Gymnothorax mccoskeri D. G. Smith & E. B. Böhlke, 1997
- Gymnothorax megaspilus E. B. Böhlke & J. E. Randall, 1995 (Oman moray)
- Gymnothorax melanosomatus K. H. Loh, K. T. Shao & H. M. Chen, 2011 (Black-body moray)
- Gymnothorax melatremus L. P. Schultz, 1953 (Dwarf moray)
- Gymnothorax meleagris (G. Shaw, 1795) (Turkey moray)
- Gymnothorax microspila (Günther, 1870) (Note: G. microspila, is listed in WoRMS, but not in FishBase.)
- Gymnothorax microstictus E. B. Böhlke, 2000 (Small-spot moray)
- Gymnothorax miliaris (Kaup, 1856) (Golden-tail moray)
- Gymnothorax minor (Temminck & Schlegel, 1846)
- Gymnothorax mishrai D. Ray, Mohapatra & D. G. Smith, 2015 (Bengal moray)
- Gymnothorax moluccensis (Bleeker, 1864) (Moluccan moray)
- Gymnothorax monochrous (Bleeker, 1856) (Drab moray)
- Gymnothorax monostigma (Regan, 1909) (One-spot moray)
- Gymnothorax mordax (Ayres, 1859) (California moray)
- Gymnothorax moringa (G. Cuvier, 1829) (Spotted moray)
- Gymnothorax mucifer Snyder, 1904
- Gymnothorax nasuta F. de Buen, 1961 (Easter Island moray)
- Gymnothorax neglectus S. Tanaka (I), 1911
- Gymnothorax nigromarginatus (Girard, 1858) (Black-edge moray)
- Gymnothorax niphostigmus H. M. Chen, K. T. Shao & C. T. Chen, 1996 (Snowflake-patched moray)
- Gymnothorax nubilus (J. Richardson, 1848) (Grey moray)
- Gymnothorax nudivomer (Günther, 1867) (Yellow-mouth moray)
- Gymnothorax nuttingi Snyder, 1904 (Nutting's moray)
- Gymnothorax obesus (Whitley, 1932) (Griffin's moray)
- Gymnothorax ocellatus Agassiz, 1831 (Caribbean ocellated moray)
- Gymnothorax odishi Mohapatra, Mohanty, Smith, Mishra, and Roy, 2018
- Gymnothorax panamensis (Steindachner, 1876) (Masked moray)
- Gymnothorax parini Collette, D. G. Smith & E. B. Böhlke, 1991
- Gymnothorax phalarus W. A. Bussing, 1998
- Gymnothorax pharaonis D. G. Smith, S. V. Bogordosky, A. O. Mal, and T. J. Alpermann, 2019 (Pharaoh's moray)
- Gymnothorax phasmatodes (J. L. B. Smith], 1962) (Ghost moray)
- Gymnothorax philippinus D. S. Jordan & Seale, 1907 (Philippines moray)
- Gymnothorax pictus (J. N. Ahl, 1789) (Paint-spotted moray)
- Gymnothorax pikei Bliss, 1883 (Pike's moray)
- Gymnothorax pindae J. L. B. Smith, 1962 (Pinda moray)
- Gymnothorax poikilospilus Chen & Huang, 2022
- Gymnothorax polygonius Poey, 1875 (Polygon moray)
- Gymnothorax polyspondylus E. B. Böhlke & J. E. Randall, 2000
- Gymnothorax polyuranodon (Bleeker, 1854) (Freshwater moray)
- Gymnothorax porphyreus (Guichenot, 1848) (Low-fin moray)
- Gymnothorax prasinus (J. Richardson, 1848) (Yellow moray)
- Gymnothorax prionodon J. D. Ogilby, 1895 (Australian mottled moray)
- Gymnothorax prismodon E. B. Böhlke & J. E. Randall, 2000
- Gymnothorax prolatus K. Sasaki & Amaoka, 1991
- Gymnothorax pseudoherrei E. B. Böhlke, 2000 (False brown moray)
- Gymnothorax pseudokidako Huang, Loh & Liao, 2021
- Gymnothorax pseudomelanosomatus K. H. Loh, K. T. Shao & H. M. Chen, 2015 (False black-body moray)
- Gymnothorax pseudoprolatus D. G. Smith, Y. Hibino, & Hsuan-Ching Ho (Short-tail Brown moray)
- Gymnothorax pseudothyrsoideus (Bleeker, 1853) (High-fin moray)
- Gymnothorax pseudotile Mohapatra, Smith, Ray, Mishra & Mohanty, 2017 (Bengal low-fin moray)
- Gymnothorax punctatofasciatus Bleeker, 1863 (Bars'n-spots moray)
- Gymnothorax punctatus Bloch & J. G. Schneider, 1801 (Red Sea white-spotted moray)
- Gymnothorax randalli D. G. Smith & E. B. Böhlke, 1997 (Randall's moray)
- Gymnothorax reevesii (J. Richardson, 1845) (Reeve's moray)
- Gymnothorax reticularis Bloch, 1795
- Gymnothorax richardsonii (Bleeker, 1852) (Richardson's moray)
- Gymnothorax robinsi E. B. Böhlke, 1997 (Robins' moray)
- Gymnothorax rueppelliae (McClelland, 1844) (Banded moray)
- Gymnothorax ryukyuensis Hatooka, 2003
- Gymnothorax sagenodeta (Richardson, 1848) Gymnothorax sagmacephalus E. B. Böhlke, 1997
- Gymnothorax saxicola D. S. Jordan & B. M. Davis, 1891 (Ocellated moray)
- Gymnothorax serratidens (Hildebrand & F. O. Barton, 1949)
- Gymnothorax shaoi H. M. Chen & K. H. Loh, 2007
- Gymnothorax sokotrensis Kotthaus, 1968
- Gymnothorax steindachneri D. S. Jordan & Evermann, 1903 (Steindachner's moray)
- Gymnothorax taiwanensis H. M. Chen, K. H. Loh & K. T. Shao, 2008 (Taiwanese moray)
- Gymnothorax tamilnaduensis Kodeeswaran, Kantharajan, Mohapatra, Kumar & Sarkar 2023
- Gymnothorax thyrsoideus (J. Richardson, 1845) (Grey-face moray)
- Gymnothorax tile (F. Hamilton, 1822) (Indian mud moray)
- Gymnothorax undulatus (Lacépède, 1803) (Undulated moray)
- Gymnothorax unicolor (Delaroche, 1809) (Brown moray)
- Gymnothorax vagrans (Seale, 1917)
- Gymnothorax verrilli (D. S. Jordan & C. H. Gilbert, 1883) (White-edged moray)
- Gymnothorax vicinus (Castelnau, 1855) (Purple-mouth moray)
- Gymnothorax vietnamensis D. G. Smith, Y. Hibino, Hsuan-Ching Ho (Vietnamese moray)
- Gymnothorax visakhaensis Mohapatra, Smith, Mohanty, Mishra & Tudu, 2017
- Gymnothorax walvisensis Prokofiev, 2009
- Gymnothorax woodwardi McCulloch, 1912
- Gymnothorax ypsilon Hatooka & J. E. Randall, 1992 (Y-bar moray)
- Gymnothorax zonipectis Seale, 1906 (Barred-fin moray)
