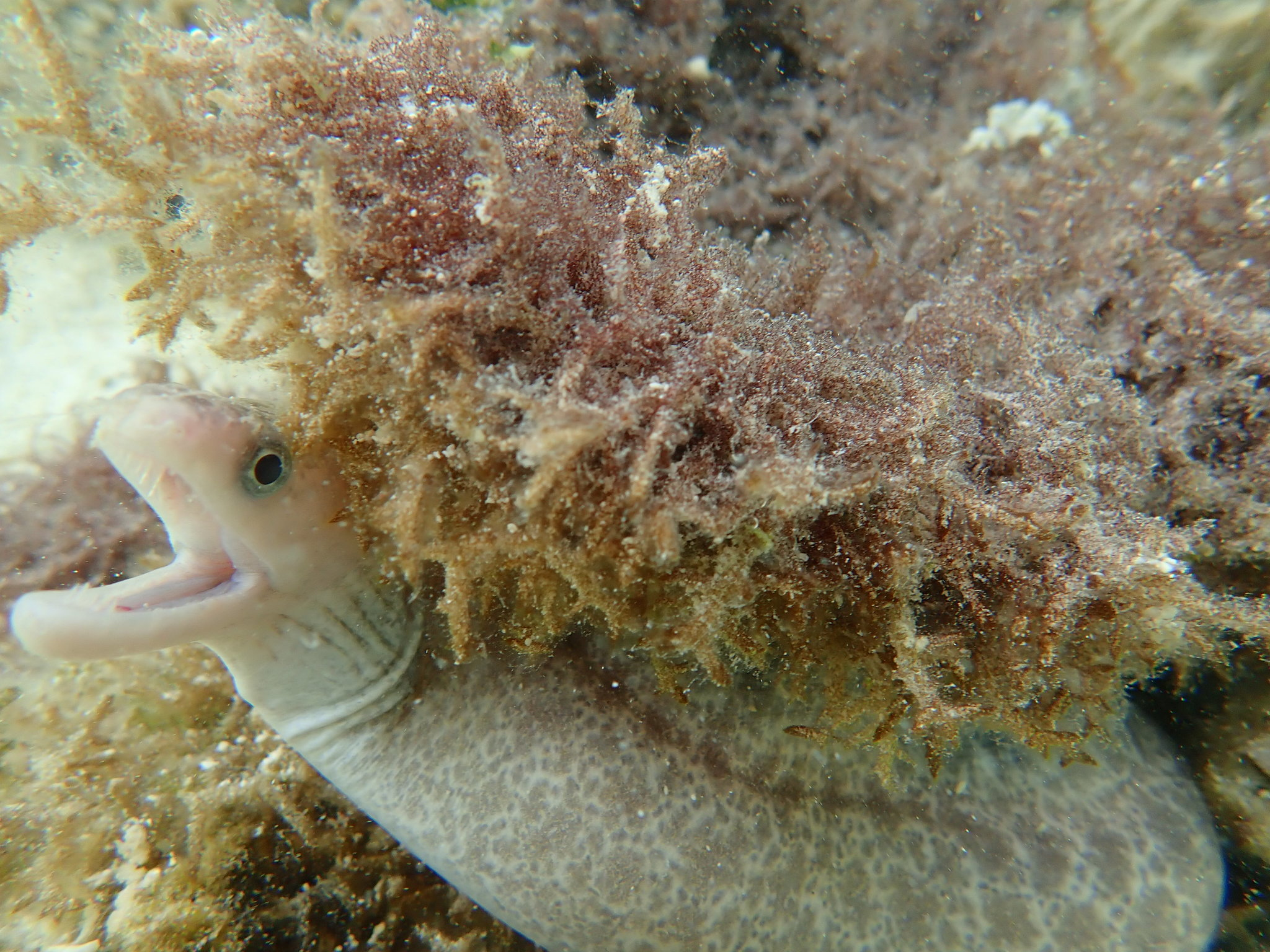

Conservation status
- Least Concern (IUCN 3.1)

Scientific classification
- Kingdom: Animalia
- Phylum: Chordata
- Class: Actinopterygii
- Order: Anguilliformes
- Family: Muraenidae
- Genus: Gymnothorax
- Species: G. cribroris

Binomial name
- Gymnothorax cribroris Whitley, 1932

= Sieve-patterned moray eel =

Species of fish

The sieve-patterned moray eel (Gymnothorax cribroris) is a species of moray eel found in coral reefs of the western Pacific Ocean and northern Australia. It was first named by Whitley in 1932 and is also commonly known as the sieve moray, brown-flecked reef eel, brown-flecked moray or the Australian moray.
