= Gymnothorax equatorialis =

Conservation status
- Least Concern (IUCN 3.1)

Scientific classification
- Kingdom: Animalia
- Phylum: Chordata
- Class: Actinopterygii
- Order: Anguilliformes
- Family: Muraenidae
- Genus: Gymnothorax
- Species: G. equatorialis

Binomial name
- Gymnothorax equatorialis (Hildebrand, 1946)

Species of fish

Gymnothorax equatorialis is a moray eel found in the eastern Pacific Ocean, from the Gulf of California to Peru. It was first named by Hildebrand in 1946, and is commonly known as the spotted-tail moray or the spottail moray.
