= Marshall Islands moray eel =

Conservation status
- Least Concern (IUCN 3.1)

Scientific classification
- Kingdom: Animalia
- Phylum: Chordata
- Class: Actinopterygii
- Order: Anguilliformes
- Family: Muraenidae
- Genus: Gymnothorax
- Species: G. marshallensis

Binomial name
- Gymnothorax marshallensis (L. P. Schultz, 1953)

Species of fish

The Marshall Islands moray (Gymnothorax marshallensis) is a moray eel found in coral reefs in the western Pacific Ocean. It was first named by Schultz in 1953,
