= Herre's moray eel =

Conservation status
- Least Concern (IUCN 3.1)

Scientific classification
- Kingdom: Animalia
- Phylum: Chordata
- Class: Actinopterygii
- Order: Anguilliformes
- Family: Muraenidae
- Genus: Gymnothorax
- Species: G. herrei

Binomial name
- Gymnothorax herrei Beebe & Tee-Van, 1933

Species of fish

Herre's moray (Gymnothorax herrei) is a moray eel found in the western Pacific and Indian Oceans. It was first named by Beebe and Tee-Van in 1933.
