= Gymnothorax prolatus =

Scientific classification
- Domain: Eukaryota
- Kingdom: Animalia
- Phylum: Chordata
- Class: Actinopterygii
- Order: Anguilliformes
- Family: Muraenidae
- Genus: Gymnothorax
- Species: G. prolatus

Binomial name
- Gymnothorax prolatus K. Sasaki & Amaoka, 1991

Species of fish

Gymnothorax prolatus is a moray eel found in the northwest Pacific Ocean, around Taiwan. It was first named by Sasaki and Amaoka in 1991, and can measure up to approximately 40 centimetres.
