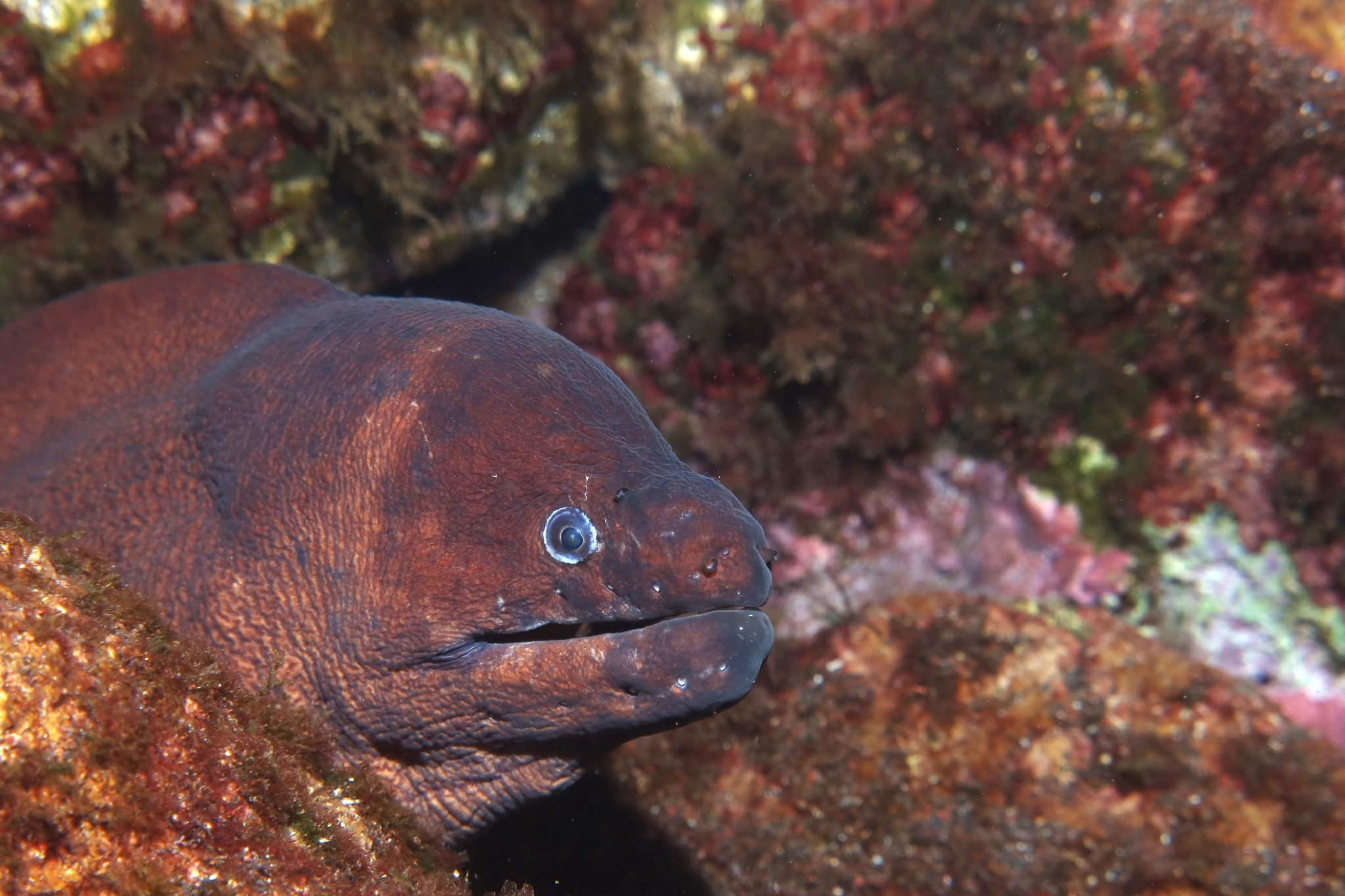

Conservation status
- Least Concern (IUCN 3.1)

Scientific classification
- Kingdom: Animalia
- Phylum: Chordata
- Class: Actinopterygii
- Order: Anguilliformes
- Family: Muraenidae
- Genus: Gymnothorax
- Species: G. unicolor

Binomial name
- Gymnothorax unicolor (Delaroche, 1809)

= Brown moray eel =

Species of fish

The brown moray eel (Gymnothorax unicolor) is a species of moray eel found in the eastern Atlantic Ocean and Mediterranean. It was first named by Delaroche in 1809.

== Distribution ==
The brown moray eel is found in the Eastern Atlantic Ocean (in the coast of Portugal, in all the archipelagos of Macaronesia and Ascension Island) and on the Mediterranean.
