= Gymnothorax dorsalis =

Scientific classification
- Domain: Eukaryota
- Kingdom: Animalia
- Phylum: Chordata
- Class: Actinopterygii
- Order: Anguilliformes
- Family: Muraenidae
- Genus: Gymnothorax
- Species: G. dorsalis

Binomial name
- Gymnothorax dorsalis (Seale, 1917)

Species of fish

Gymnothorax dorsalis is a moray eel found in the western Pacific Ocean, around Hong Kong, Malacca, Malaysia, and Taiwan. It was first named by Seale in 1917.
