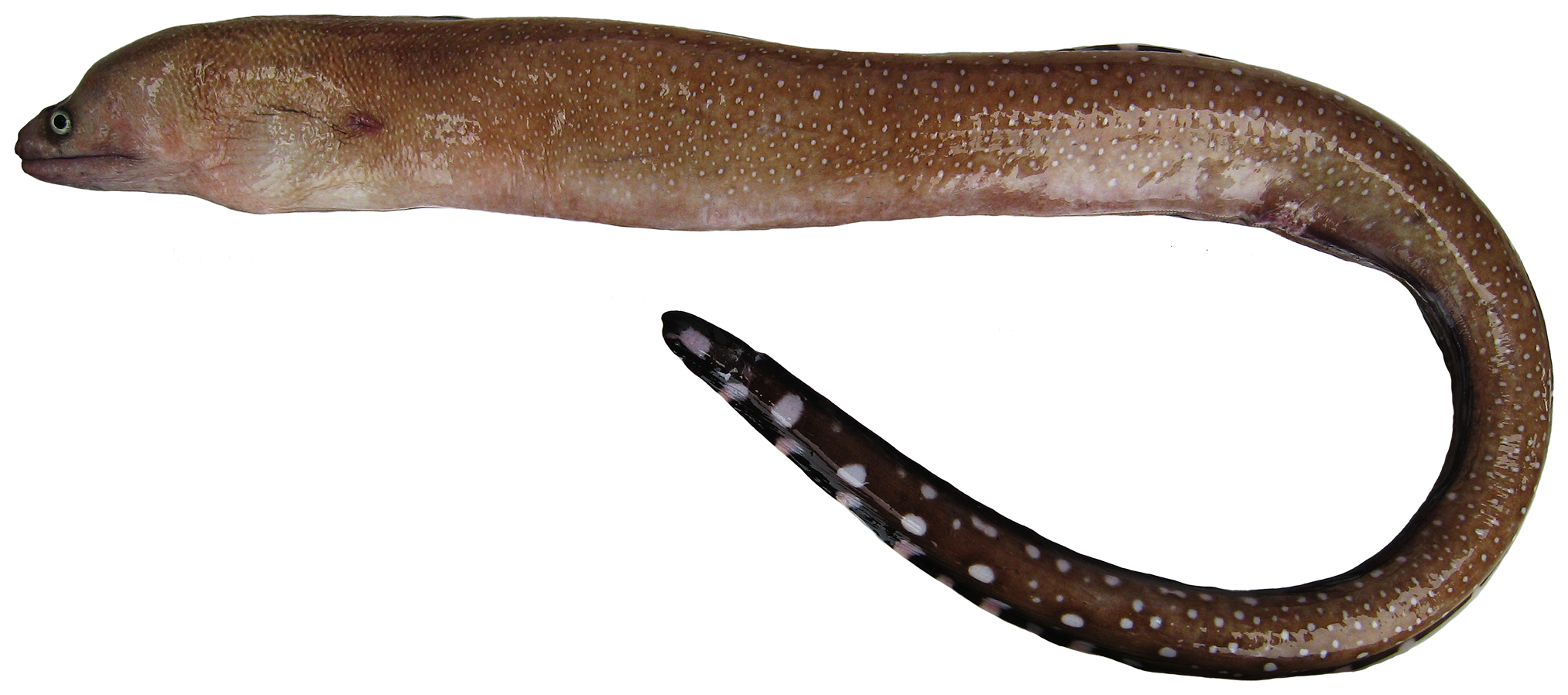

Conservation status
- Least Concern (IUCN 3.1)

Scientific classification
- Kingdom: Animalia
- Phylum: Chordata
- Class: Actinopterygii
- Order: Anguilliformes
- Family: Muraenidae
- Genus: Gymnothorax
- Species: G. conspersus

Binomial name
- Gymnothorax conspersus Poey, 1867

= Saddled moray eel =

Species of fish

The saddled moray eel (Gymnothorax conspersus) is a moray eel found in the western Atlantic Ocean. It was first named by Felipe Poey in 1867.
