= Gymnothorax vagrans =

Conservation status
- Data Deficient (IUCN 3.1)

Scientific classification
- Kingdom: Animalia
- Phylum: Chordata
- Class: Actinopterygii
- Order: Anguilliformes
- Family: Muraenidae
- Genus: Gymnothorax
- Species: G. vagrans

Binomial name
- Gymnothorax vagrans (Seale, 1917)

Species of fish

Gymnothorax vagrans is a moray eel found around South America. It was first named by Seale in 1917.
