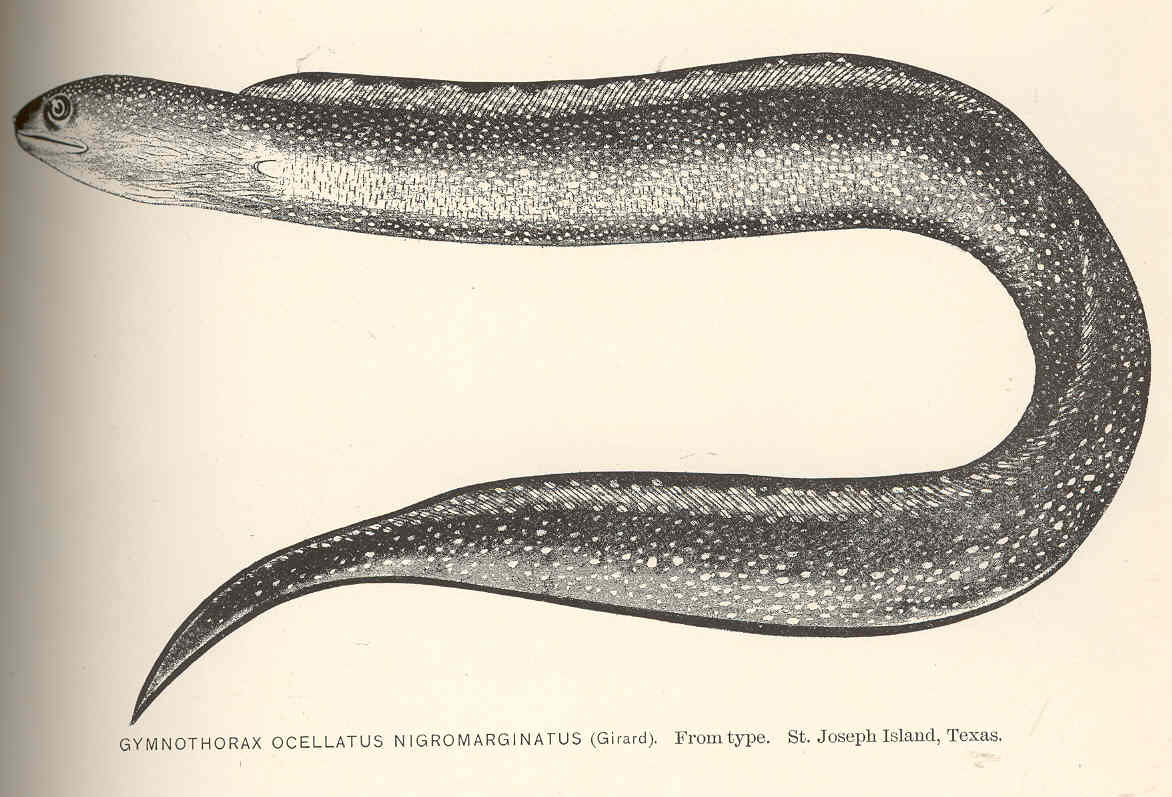

Conservation status
- Least Concern (IUCN 3.1)

Scientific classification
- Kingdom: Animalia
- Phylum: Chordata
- Class: Actinopterygii
- Order: Anguilliformes
- Family: Muraenidae
- Genus: Gymnothorax
- Species: G. nigromarginatus

Binomial name
- Gymnothorax nigromarginatus (Girard, 1858)

= Blackedge moray eel =

Species of fish

The blackedge moray eel (Gymnothorax nigromarginatus) is a moray eel found in coral reefs in the western Atlantic Ocean. It was first named by Charles Frédéric Girard in 1858.
