= Gymnothorax microspila =

Scientific classification
- Domain: Eukaryota
- Kingdom: Animalia
- Phylum: Chordata
- Class: Actinopterygii
- Order: Anguilliformes
- Family: Muraenidae
- Genus: Gymnothorax
- Species: G. microspila

Binomial name
- Gymnothorax microspila (Günther, 1870)

Species of fish

Gymnothorax microspila is a moray eel found in the eastern Indian Ocean, around the East Indian Archipelago. It was first named by Albert Günther in 1870.
