= Castle's moray eel =

Conservation status
- Least Concern (IUCN 3.1)

Scientific classification
- Kingdom: Animalia
- Phylum: Chordata
- Class: Actinopterygii
- Order: Anguilliformes
- Family: Muraenidae
- Genus: Gymnothorax
- Species: G. castlei

Binomial name
- Gymnothorax castlei E. B. Böhlke & J. E. Randall, 1999

Species of fish

Castle's moray (Gymnothorax castlei) is a moray eel found in coral reefs in the western central Pacific Ocean. It was first named by E.B. Böhlke and J.E. Randall in 1999.
