= Spotjaw moray eel =

Conservation status
- Least Concern (IUCN 3.1)

Scientific classification
- Kingdom: Animalia
- Phylum: Chordata
- Class: Actinopterygii
- Order: Anguilliformes
- Family: Muraenidae
- Genus: Gymnothorax
- Species: G. mareei

Binomial name
- Gymnothorax mareei Poll, 1953

Species of fish

The spotjaw moray (Gymnothorax mareei) is a moray eel found in the eastern Atlantic Ocean. It was first named by Max Poll in 1953.
