= Gymnothorax prismodon =

Scientific classification
- Kingdom: Animalia
- Phylum: Chordata
- Class: Actinopterygii
- Order: Anguilliformes
- Family: Muraenidae
- Genus: Gymnothorax
- Species: G. prismodon

Binomial name
- Gymnothorax prismodon E. B. Böhlke & J. E. Randall, 2000

Species of fish

Gymnothorax prismodon is a moray eel found in the eastern central Pacific Ocean, specifically Hawaii. The species was described by ichthyologists Eugenia Brandt Böhlke John Ernest Randall in 2000. It is commonly known as the sawtooth moray. The species is preyed on by the Hawaiian monk seal.
