= Gymnothorax emmae =

Scientific classification
- Kingdom: Animalia
- Phylum: Chordata
- Class: Actinopterygii
- Order: Anguilliformes
- Family: Muraenidae
- Genus: Gymnothorax
- Species: G. emmae

Binomial name
- Gymnothorax emmae Prokofiev, 2010

Species of fish

Gymnothorax emmae is a moray eel found in tropical ocean waters off Vietnam. It is found in coral reefs at a depth range of 14m-100m in the South China Sea. The maximum length of this species 43.0 cm.

Eggs of this species are large (1 mm in diameter), and pallid yellowish.
