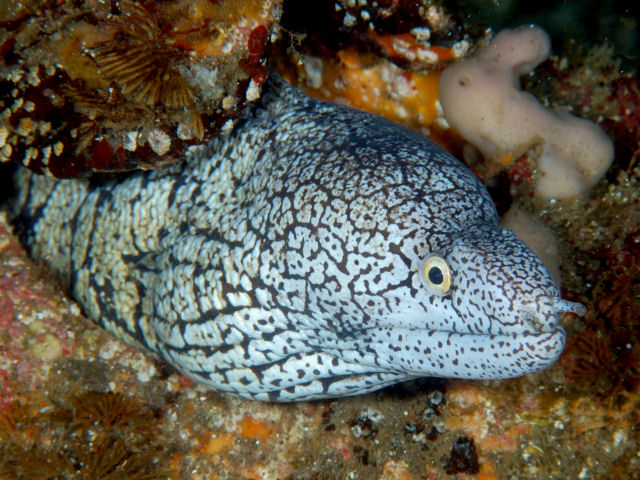

Conservation status
- Least Concern (IUCN 3.1)

Scientific classification
- Kingdom: Animalia
- Phylum: Chordata
- Class: Actinopterygii
- Order: Anguilliformes
- Family: Muraenidae
- Genus: Gymnothorax
- Species: G. berndti

Binomial name
- Gymnothorax berndti Snyder, 1904

= Gymnothorax berndti =

Y-patterned moray

Species of fish

The y-patterned moray, y-patterned moray eel, or Berndt's moray (Gymnothorax berndti) is a deep-water moray eel found in coral reefs in the Pacific and western Indian Oceans at depths to 300 m. It was described by John Otterbein Snyder in 1904.

Gymnothorax berndti can grow to 100 cm (39 in) total length.
