= Speckled moray =

Conservation status
- Least Concern (IUCN 3.1)

Scientific classification
- Kingdom: Animalia
- Phylum: Chordata
- Class: Actinopterygii
- Order: Anguilliformes
- Family: Muraenidae
- Genus: Gymnothorax
- Species: G. obesus

Binomial name
- Gymnothorax obesus (Whitley, 1932)

Species of fish

The speckled moray, or Griffin's moray (Gymnothorax obesus) is a moray eel of the genus Gymnothorax, found in Australia and around the offshore islands off Northland and the Bay of Plenty in the North Island of New Zealand at depths down to 100 m, in reef areas of broken rock. Their length is between 40 and 200 cm.
