= Gymnothorax robinsi =

Conservation status
- Least Concern (IUCN 3.1)

Scientific classification
- Kingdom: Animalia
- Phylum: Chordata
- Class: Actinopterygii
- Order: Anguilliformes
- Family: Muraenidae
- Genus: Gymnothorax
- Species: G. robinsi

Binomial name
- Gymnothorax robinsi E. B. Böhlke, 1997

Species of fish

The pygmy moray or Robin's moray (Gymnothorax robinsi) is a moray eel found in coral reefs in the western Pacific and Indian oceans. It was first named by Eugenia Brandt Böhlke in 1997,
