= Y-bar moray eel =

Y-Bar moray

Conservation status
- Least Concern (IUCN 3.1)

Scientific classification
- Kingdom: Animalia
- Phylum: Chordata
- Class: Actinopterygii
- Order: Anguilliformes
- Family: Muraenidae
- Genus: Gymnothorax
- Species: G. ypsilon

Binomial name
- Gymnothorax ypsilon Hatooka & J. E. Randall, 1992

Species of fish

The Y-bar moray, Gymnothorax ypsilon, is a deep-water moray eel found in the Pacific Ocean at depths to 185 m.
