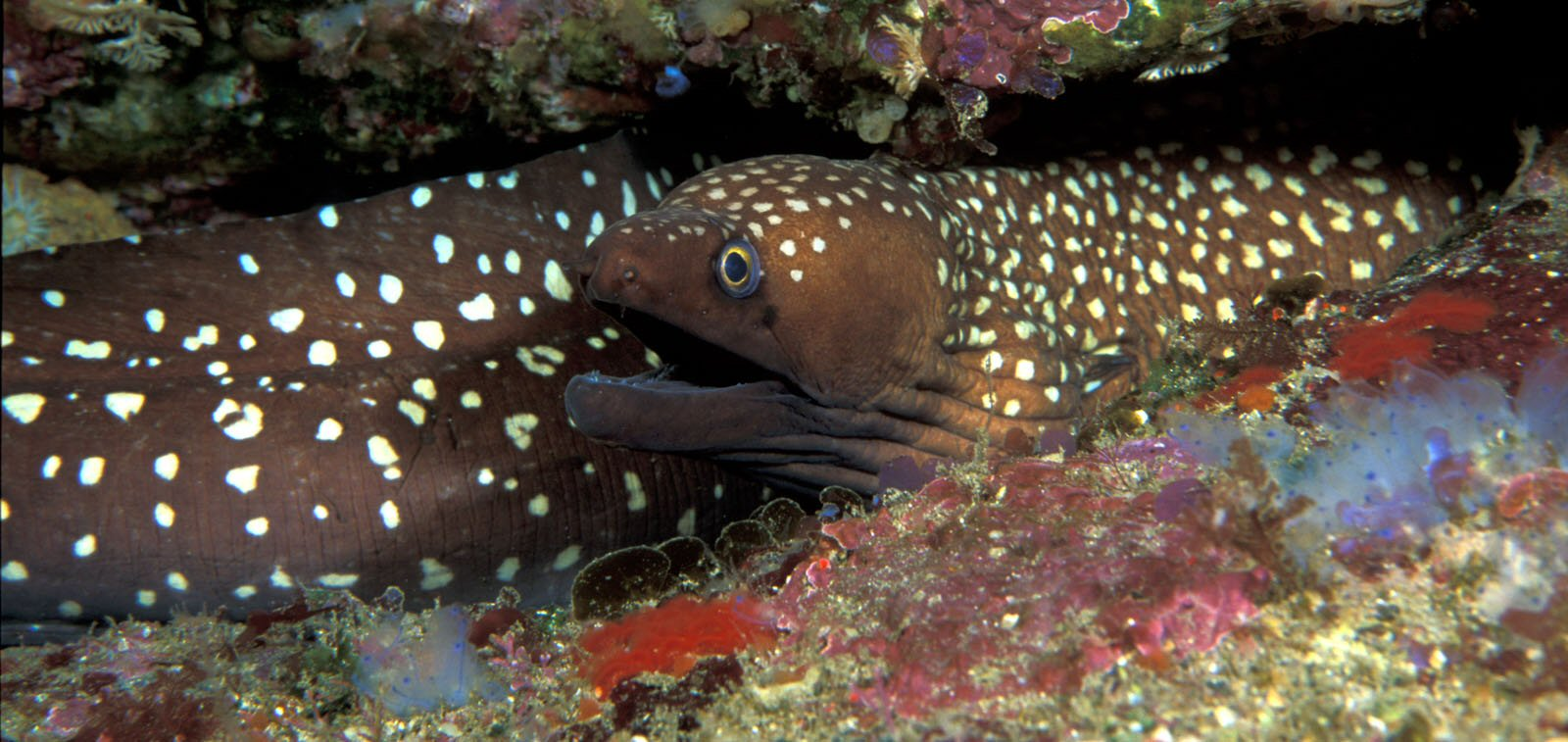

Scientific classification
- Kingdom: Animalia
- Phylum: Chordata
- Class: Actinopterygii
- Order: Anguilliformes
- Family: Muraenidae
- Genus: Gymnothorax
- Species: G. prionodon

Binomial name
- Gymnothorax prionodon J. D. Ogilby, 1895

= Australian mottled moray =

Species of fish

The Australian mottled moray (in Australia), and mottled moray (in New Zealand), Gymnothorax prionodon, is a moray eel of the family Muraenidae, found at depths down to 80 m. Their length is between 80 and 150 cm.
