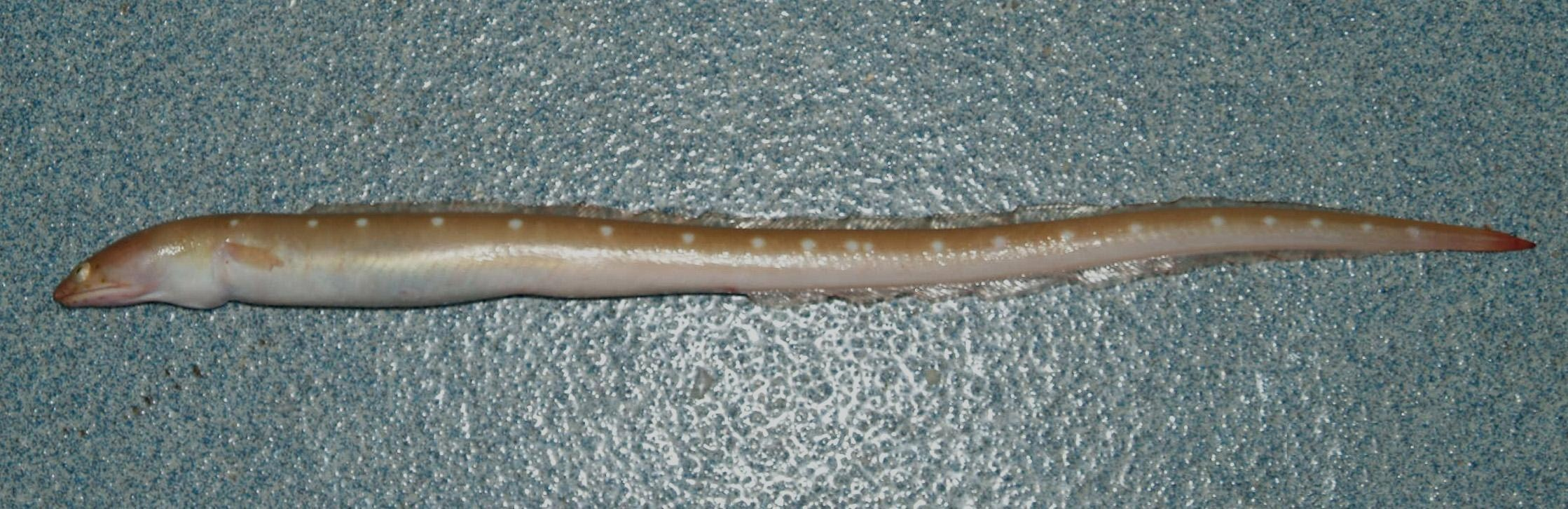
- Ophichthus puncticeps
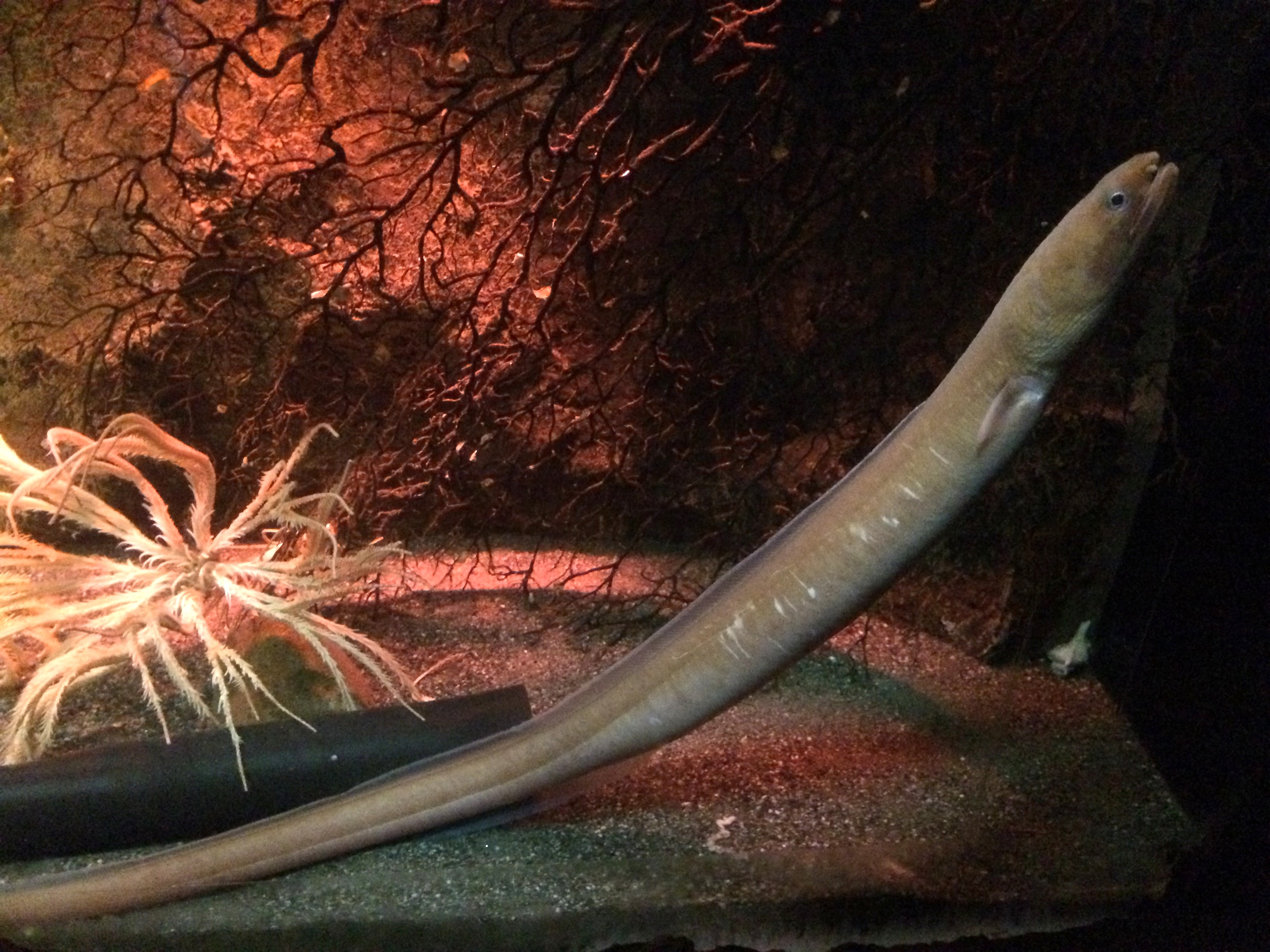
- Ophichthus urolophus

Scientific classification
- Kingdom: Animalia
- Phylum: Chordata
- Class: Actinopterygii
- Division: Teleostei
- Order: Anguilliformes
- Family: Ophichthidae
- Subfamily: Ophichthinae
- Genus: Ophichthus; J. N. Ahl, 1789

Type species
- Muraena ophis Linnaeus, 1758

= Ophichthus =

Genus of fishes

Ophichthus is a genus of eels in the snake eel family Ophichthidae.

== Species ==
There are about 100 recognized species in this genus. Below is the majority of them:

- Ophichthus alleni J. E. McCosker, 2010
- Ophichthus altipennis (Kaup, 1856) (High-fin snake eel)
- Ophichthus aniptocheilos J. E. McCosker, 2010
- Ophichthus apachus J. E. McCosker & Rosenblatt, 1998 (Thin snake eel)
- Ophichthus aphotistos J. E. McCosker & Y. Y. Chen, 2000 (Dark deep-water snake eel)
- Ophichthus apicalis (Anonymous, referred to E. T. Bennett, 1830) (Blunt-nose snake eel)
- Ophichthus arneutes J. E. McCosker & Rosenblatt, 1998
- Ophichthus asakusae D. S. Jordan & Snyder, 1901
- Ophichthus bicolor J. E. McCosker & H. C. Ho, 2015 (Bicolored snake eel)
- Ophichthus bonaparti (Kaup, 1856) (Napoleon snake eel)
- Ophichthus brachynotopterus Karrer, 1982
- Ophichthus brasiliensis (Kaup, 1856)
- Ophichthus brevicaudatus Y. T. Chu, H. L. Wu & X. B. Jin, 1981
- Ophichthus brevirostris J. E. McCosker & S. W. Ross, 2007 (Snub-nose snake eel)
- Ophichthus celebicus (Bleeker, 1856)
- Ophichthus cephalozona Bleeker, 1864 (Dark-shouldered snake eel)
- Ophichthus congroides J. E. McCosker, 2010
- Ophichthus cruentifer (Goode & T. H. Bean, 1896) (Margined snake eel)
- Ophichthus cylindroideus (Ranzani, 1839) (Dusky snake eel)
- Ophichthus echeloides (D'Ancona, 1928)
- Ophichthus erabo (D. S. Jordan & Snyder, 1901) (Blotched snake eel)
- Ophichthus exourus J. E. McCosker, 1999
- Ophichthus fasciatus (Y. T. Chu, H. L. Wu & X. B. Jin, 1981)
- Ophichthus fowleri (D. S. Jordan & Evermann, 1903) (Fowler's snake eel)
- Ophichthus frontalis Garman, 1899 (Death-banded snake eel)
- Ophichthus genie J. E. McCosker, 1999
- Ophichthus gomesii (Castelnau, 1855) (Shrimp snake eel)
- Ophichthus grandoculis (Cantor, 1849)
- Ophichthus hirritus J. E. McCosker, 2010
- Ophichthus humanni J. E. McCosker, 2010
- Ophichthus hyposagmatus J. E. McCosker & E. B. Böhlke, 1984 (Faint-saddled snake eel)
- Ophichthus ishiyamorum J. E. McCosker, 2010
- Ophichthus kbalanensis Y. Hibino, H.-C. Ho, J. F. Huang
- Ophichthus kunaloa J. E. McCosker, 1979
- Ophichthus kusanagi Y. Hibino, J. E. McCosker, Tashiro,
- Ophichthus lentiginosus J. E. McCosker, 2010
- Ophichthus leonensis Blache, 1975
- Ophichthus limkouensis J. S. T. F. Chen, 1929
- Ophichthus lithinus (D. S. Jordan & R. E. Richardson, 1908) (Evermann's snake eel)
- Ophichthus longicorpus (V. Q. Vo & H.-C. Ho, 2021) (Long-body snake eel)
- Ophichthus longipenis J. E. McCosker & Rosenblatt, 1998 (Slender snake eel)
- Ophichthus lupus Y. Hibino, J. E. McCosker, Tashiro,
- Ophichthus machidai J. E. McCosker, S. Ide & Endo, 2012 (Machida's snake eel)
- Ophichthus macrochir (Bleeker, 1853) (Big-fin snake eel)
- Ophichthus macrops Günther, 1910
- Ophichthus maculatus (Rafinesque, 1810)
- Ophichthus manilensis Herre, 1923
- Ophichthus marginatus (W. K. H. Peters, 1855) (Short-head snake eel)
- Ophichthus mecopterus J. E. McCosker & Rosenblatt, 1998 (Long-armed snake eel)
- Ophichthus megalops Asano, 1987
- Ophichthus melanoporus Kanazawa, 1963 (Black-pored snake eel)
- Ophichthus melope J. E. McCosker & Rosenblatt, 1998
- Ophichthus menezesi J. E. McCosker & E. B. Böhlke, 1984
- Ophichthus microstictus J. E. McCosker, 2010
- Ophichthus multidentis Y. Hibino, H.-C. Ho, J. F. Huang
- Ophichthus mystacinus J. E. McCosker, 1999
- Ophichthus naga J. E. McCosker & Psomadakis, 2018
- Ophichthus obtusus J. E. McCosker, S. Ide & Endo, 2012 (Pug-nosed snake eel)
- Ophichthus oligosteus Y. Hibino, J. E. McCosker, Tashiro,
- Ophichthus omorgmus J. E. McCosker & E. B. Böhlke, 1984 (Dotted-line snake eel)
- Ophichthus ophis (Linnaeus, 1758) (Spotted snake eel)
- Ophichthus polyophthalmus Bleeker, 1864 (Many-eyed snake eel)
- Ophichthus pratasensis Hsuan-Ching Ho, Shing-Lai Ng & Tzu-Yung Lin, 2022
- Ophichthus pullus J. E. McCosker, 2005
- Ophichthus puncticeps (Kaup, 1860) (Pale-spotted snake eel)
- Ophichthus remiger (Valenciennes, 1837) (Punctuated snake eel)
- Ophichthus retrodorsalis D. Liu, W. Q. Tang & C. G. Zhang, 2010
- Ophichthus rex E. B. Böhlke & J. H. Caruso, 1980 (King snake eel)
- Ophichthus roseus S. Tanaka (I), 1917
- Ophichthus rotundus C. L. Lee & Asano, 1997
- Ophichthus rufus (Rafinesque, 1810) (Rufus snake eel)
- Ophichthus rugifer D. S. Jordan & Bollman, 1890
- Ophichthus rutidoderma (Bleeker, 1853) (Olive snake eel)
- Ophichthus serpentinus Seale, 1917
- Ophichthus shaoi J. E. McCosker & H. C. Ho, 2015 (Long-bodied snake eel)
- Ophichthus singapurensis Bleeker, 1864
- Ophichthus spinicauda (Norman, 1922) (Antillean snake eel)
- Ophichthus stenopterus Cope, 1871
- Ophichthus tchangi W. Q. Tang & C. G. Zhang, 2002
- Ophichthus tetratrema J. E. McCosker & Rosenblatt, 1998
- Ophichthus tomioi J. E. McCosker, 2010
- Ophichthus triserialis (Kaup, 1856) (Pacific snake eel)
- Ophichthus tsuchidae D. S. Jordan & Snyder, 1901
- Ophichthus unicolor Regan, 1908 (Plain snake eel)
- Ophichthus urolophus (Temminck & Schlegel, 1846) (Mane-tail snake eel)
- Ophichthus vietnamensis V. Q. Vo, Y. Hibino & H.C. Ho, 2019
- Ophichthus woosuitingi J. S. T. F. Chen, 1929
- Ophichthus yamakawai Y. Hibino, J. E. McCosker, Tashiro,
- Ophichthus zophochir D. S. Jordan & C. H. Gilbert, 1882 (Yellow snake eel)
