= Ophichthus arneutes =

Scientific classification
- Domain: Eukaryota
- Kingdom: Animalia
- Phylum: Chordata
- Class: Actinopterygii
- Order: Anguilliformes
- Family: Ophichthidae
- Genus: Ophichthus
- Species: O. arneutes

Binomial name
- Ophichthus arneutes J. E. McCosker & Rosenblatt, 1998

Species of fish

Ophichthus arneutes is an eel in the family Ophichthidae. It was described by John E. McCosker and Richard Heinrich Rosenblatt in 1998. It is a marine, deep water-dwelling eel which is known from the Galapagos Islands, in the southeastern Pacific Ocean. It dwells at a depth range of 434 to 557 m (1,424 to 1,827 ft). Males can reach a maximum total length of 30.6 cm (12.0 in).

The specific epithet arneutes means "diver" in Greek, and refers simultaneously to the depth at which the species is found, and to the method of capture.
