= Ophichthus longipenis =

Scientific classification
- Domain: Eukaryota
- Kingdom: Animalia
- Phylum: Chordata
- Class: Actinopterygii
- Order: Anguilliformes
- Family: Ophichthidae
- Genus: Ophichthus
- Species: O. longipenis

Binomial name
- Ophichthus longipenis J. E. McCosker & Rosenblatt, 1998

Species of fish

Ophichthus longipenis, known commonly as the slender snake eel in Mexico, is an eel in the family Ophichthidae (worm/snake eels). It was described by John E. McCosker and Richard Heinrich Rosenblatt in 1998. It is a marine, tropical eel which is known from the eastern central Pacific Ocean, including Mexico, El Salvador, Guatemala, Honduras, Nicaragua, Costa Rica and Panama. It dwells at a depth range of 0 to 69 metres (0 to 226 ft), and inhabits sand sediments. Males can reach a maximum total length of 58.7 centimetres (23.1 in).

The species epithet "longipenis" means "long tail" in Latin. Due to its moderately wide distribution in its region, its lack of known threats, and lack of observed population decline, the IUCN redlist currently lists O. longipenis as Least Concern.
