= Black-pored snake-eel =

Scientific classification
- Domain: Eukaryota
- Kingdom: Animalia
- Phylum: Chordata
- Class: Actinopterygii
- Order: Anguilliformes
- Family: Ophichthidae
- Genus: Ophichthus
- Species: O. melope

Binomial name
- Ophichthus melope J. E. McCosker & Rosenblatt, 1998

Species of fish

Ophichthus melope is an eel in the family Ophichthidae (worm/snake eels). It was described by John E. McCosker and Richard Heinrich Rosenblatt in 1998. It is a marine, tropical eel which is known from the eastern central and southeastern Pacific Ocean, including Colombia and Costa Rica. It dwells at a depth range of 100 to 224 metres (328 to 735 ft). Males can reach a maximum total length of 27 centimetres (11 in).

The species epithet "melope" means "black cavity" in Greek, and is treated as a noun in apposition. It refers to the rings surrounding the pores. Due to a lack of known threats and observed population decline, the IUCN redlist currently lists O. melope as Least Concern.
