= Ophichthus tetratrema =

Scientific classification
- Domain: Eukaryota
- Kingdom: Animalia
- Phylum: Chordata
- Class: Actinopterygii
- Order: Anguilliformes
- Family: Ophichthidae
- Genus: Ophichthus
- Species: O. tetratrema

Binomial name
- Ophichthus tetratrema J. E. McCosker & Rosenblatt, 1998

Species of fish

Ophichthus tetratrema is an eel in the family Ophichthidae (worm/snake eels). It was described by John E. McCosker and Richard Heinrich Rosenblatt in 1998. It is a marine, deep water-dwelling eel which is known from the eastern Pacific Ocean, including Costa Rica and Ecuador. It dwells at a depth range of 700 to 1,000 metres (2,300 to 3,300 ft). Females can reach a total length of 55.6 centimetres (21.9 in).

The species epithet "tetratrema" means "four holed" in Greek, and is treated as a noun in apposition. It refers to the four preopercular pores on the eel.
