= Snack eel =

Conservation status
- Data Deficient (IUCN 3.1)

Scientific classification
- Kingdom: Animalia
- Phylum: Chordata
- Class: Actinopterygii
- Order: Anguilliformes
- Family: Ophichthidae
- Genus: Ethadophis
- Species: E. merenda

Binomial name
- Ethadophis merenda Rosenblatt & McCosker, 1970

Species of fish

The Snack eel (Ethadophis merenda) is a species of ray-finned fish belonging to the family Ophichthidae, the worm and snake eels. It was described by Richard Heinrich Rosenblatt and John E. McCosker in 1970. It is a marine, subtropical eel which is known from a single specimen discovered in Mexico, in the eastern central Pacific Ocean. From the holotype, which was found in the stomach of a White seabass, males are known to reach a total length of 53 centimetres (21 in).

Due to the lack of multiple known specimens, and thereby an inability to acquire data on the ecology, habitat or threats faced by the species, the IUCN redlist currently lists the Snack eel as Data Deficient.
