= Ordinary eel =

Conservation status
- Data Deficient (IUCN 3.1)

Scientific classification
- Kingdom: Animalia
- Phylum: Chordata
- Class: Actinopterygii
- Order: Anguilliformes
- Family: Ophichthidae
- Genus: Ethadophis
- Species: E. byrnei

Binomial name
- Ethadophis byrnei Rosenblatt & McCosker, 1970

Species of fish

The Ordinary eel (Ethadophis byrnei, also known as the Ordinary snake-eel) is an eel in the family Ophichthidae (worm/snake eels). It was described by Richard Heinrich Rosenblatt and John E. McCosker. It is a marine, subtropical eel which is known from a single specimen collected from a sandbank in the Gulf of California, in the eastern central Pacific Ocean, during low tide. From the holotype, it is known to reach a total length of 51 centimetres (20 in).

The IUCN redlist currently lists the Ordinary eel as Data Deficient due to the extremely limited number of described specimens, but notes that its habitat falls into a region of threat from coastal development.
