= Thin snake eel =

Scientific classification
- Domain: Eukaryota
- Kingdom: Animalia
- Phylum: Chordata
- Class: Actinopterygii
- Order: Anguilliformes
- Family: Ophichthidae
- Genus: Ophichthus
- Species: O. apachus

Binomial name
- Ophichthus apachus J. E. McCosker & Rosenblatt, 1998

Species of fish

The thin snake eel (Ophichthus apachus) is an eel in the family Ophichthidae. It was described by John E. McCosker and Richard Heinrich Rosenblatt in 1998. It is a marine, tropical eel known from the eastern central and southeastern Pacific Ocean, including Mexico and Colombia. It is known from two specimens observed dwelling in sand at a depth range of 0 to 8 m (0 to 26 ft). The maximum length recorded was 23.1 cm (9.1 in), albeit on an immature specimen.

The species epithet apachus, meaning "without thickness" in Greek, refers to the eel's thin frame. Due to the extremely minimal number of known specimens, and insufficient statistical data derived from them, the IUCN Redlist currently lists the thin snake eel as Data Deficient.
