= Dottedline snake eel =

Scientific classification
- Domain: Eukaryota
- Kingdom: Animalia
- Phylum: Chordata
- Class: Actinopterygii
- Order: Anguilliformes
- Family: Ophichthidae
- Genus: Ophichthus
- Species: O. omorgmus

Binomial name
- Ophichthus omorgmus J. E. McCosker & E. B. Böhlke, 1984

Species of fish

The dottedline snake eel (Ophichthus omorgmus) is a species of eels in the family Ophichthidae (worm/snake eels). It was described by John E. McCosker and Eugenia Brandt Böhlke in 1984. It is a marine, temperate water-dwelling eel which is known from the western central Atlantic Ocean. It is known to dwell at a depth of 183 meters.
