= Longarmed snake eel =

Scientific classification
- Domain: Eukaryota
- Kingdom: Animalia
- Phylum: Chordata
- Class: Actinopterygii
- Order: Anguilliformes
- Family: Ophichthidae
- Genus: Ophichthus
- Species: O. mecopterus

Binomial name
- Ophichthus mecopterus J. E. McCosker & Rosenblatt, 1998

Species of fish

The longarmed snake eel (Ophichthus mecopterus) is an eel in the family Ophichthidae (worm/snake eels). It was described by John E. McCosker and Richard Heinrich Rosenblatt in 1998. It is a marine, tropical eel which is known from the eastern central Pacific Ocean, including Mexico, Costa Rica, El Salvador, Guatemala, Nicaragua, and Panama. It is known to dwell at a depth range of 24 to 79 metres (79 to 259 ft), and inhabits soft substrates. Males can reach a maximum total length of 27.4 centimetres (10.8 in).

The species epithet "mecopterus" means "long fin" in Ancient Greek, and refers to the elongated pectoral fins on the species. Due to its wide distribution in the eastern Pacific, lack of known threats and lack of observed population declines, the IUCN redlist currently lists the Longarmed snake eel as Least Concern.
