= Ethadophis =

Scientific classification
- Domain: Eukaryota
- Kingdom: Animalia
- Phylum: Chordata
- Class: Actinopterygii
- Order: Anguilliformes
- Family: Ophichthidae
- Subfamily: Ophichthinae
- Genus: Ethadophis; Rosenblatt & McCosker, 1970

Species
- See text.

Genus of fishes

Ethadophis is a genus of eels in the snake eel family Ophichthidae. It currently contains the following species:

- Ethadophis akkistikos McCosker & J. E. Böhlke, 1984 (Indifferent eel)
- Ethadophis byrnei Rosenblatt & McCosker, 1970 (Ordinary eel)
- Ethadophis epinepheli (Blache & Bauchot, 1972)
- Ethadophis foresti (Cadenat & C. Roux, 1964)
- Ethadophis merenda Rosenblatt & McCosker, 1970 (Snack eel)
