= Ophichthus bicolor =

Scientific classification
- Domain: Eukaryota
- Kingdom: Animalia
- Phylum: Chordata
- Class: Actinopterygii
- Order: Anguilliformes
- Family: Ophichthidae
- Genus: Ophichthus
- Species: O. bicolor

Binomial name
- Ophichthus bicolor J. E. McCosker & H. C. Ho, 2015

Species of eel

Ophichthus bicolor, the bicolored snake eel, is an eel in the family Ophichthidae (worm/snake eels), found around Taiwan. This species reaches a length of 92.7 cm (36.5 in).
