= Gerald R. Allen =

American-born Australian ichthyologist (born 1942)

Gerald Robert "Gerry" Allen (born 26 March 1942 in Los Angeles, California) is an American-born Australian ichthyologist. His career began in 1963, when he spent a semester at the University of Hawaii, where he also received a PhD in marine zoology in 1971. In 1972, Allen wrote his doctoral thesis on the systematics and biology of the anemone fish.

In 1974, he was made curator at the Western Australian Museum in Perth till 1997, where Allen moved to Conservation International, working as a science team leader undertaking coral reef fish surveys in Papua New Guinea, Indonesia, and the Philippines until 2003. Allen has written 33 books and about 400 scientific papers. In 2003, he received the K. Radway Allen Award from the Australian Society for Fish Biology for his scientific achievements in fish biology.

He has mapped and analysed the distributions of all Indo-Pacific coral reef fishes. Allen continues to publish scientific papers and is involved in the nonprofit organisation Conservation International, especially for the preservation of biodiversity in the area of Vogelkop Peninsula.

== Taxon named in his honor ==
- The fish genus Allenichthys Pietsch 1984 is named after him.

=== The following species ===
- The rainbowfish Chilatherina alleni is "named in honour of Gerald R. Allen, in recognition of his outstanding contribution to ichthyology and his deep commitment to the study and preservation of the aquatic fauna of New Guinea." - Adrian R. Tappin
- The sandburrower Creedia alleni J. S. Nelson 1983 in honor of Allen for his many contributions to ichthyology at the Western Australia Museum in Perth, who brought this species to Nelson’s attention knowing he would describe it.
- The little rainbow wrasse Dotalabrus alleni Russell 1988 was named in honor of Allen who collected the type series and drew Russell’s attention to the species that had not been previously described.
- The Wrasse Labropsis alleni Randall 1981 was named in honor of Allen who collected six of the fourteen type specimens.
- The sole Leptachirus alleni Randall 2007 is named after Allen who collected the type specimens.
- The eel, Ophichthus alleni, J. E. McCosker, 2010
- The skate Pavoraja alleni McEachran & Fechhelm, 1982 is named after him.
- The perchlet Plectranthias alleni Randall 1980 was named after Allen who provided the type specimens to Randall knowing that the species was undescribed and Randall would describe it.
- The goby Schismatogobius alleni Keith, Lord & Larson, 2017 in honor of Allen for his extensive work on the freshwater fish fauna of Papua New Guinea.
- The goby Stenogobius alleni Watson, 1991 is named in honor of Allen because of his contributions to the freshwater ichthyology of Papua New Guinea.
- Allen's shrimpgoby Tomiyamichthys alleni Iwata, Ohnishi & Hirata, 2000 is named after him.

== Taxon described by him ==
- See Category:Taxa named by Gerald R. Allen
