= Ophichthus genie =

Scientific classification
- Kingdom: Animalia
- Phylum: Chordata
- Class: Actinopterygii
- Order: Anguilliformes
- Family: Ophichthidae
- Genus: Ophichthus
- Species: O. genie

Binomial name
- Ophichthus genie J. E. McCosker, 1999

Species of fish

Ophichthus genie is an eel in the family Ophichthidae (worm/snake eels). It was described by John E. McCosker in 1999. It is a marine, deep water-dwelling eel which is known from the Indo-Pacific, including New Caledonia and Maldives. It dwells at a depth range of 430 to 500 metres (1,410 to 1,640 ft). Males can reach a maximum total length of 33.7 centimetres (13.3 in).

The species epithet "genie" was given in honour of ichthyologist Eugenia B. Böhlke. (1929-2001), of the Academy of Natural Sciences of Philadelphia.
