= Ophichthus pullus =

Scientific classification
- Domain: Eukaryota
- Kingdom: Animalia
- Phylum: Chordata
- Class: Actinopterygii
- Order: Anguilliformes
- Family: Ophichthidae
- Genus: Ophichthus
- Species: O. pullus

Binomial name
- Ophichthus pullus J. E. McCosker, 2005

Species of fish

Ophichthus pullus is an eel in the family Ophichthidae (worm/snake eels). It was co-discovered by John E. McCosker and Ian Moore in 2005. It is a marine, tropical eel which is known from Angola and Guinea-Bissau, in the eastern Atlantic Ocean. It dwells at a depth range of 106 to 154 metres (348 to 505 ft). Males can reach a maximum total length of 58.5 centimetres (23.0 in).

The species epithet "pullus" means "dark coloured" in Latin, and refers to the eel's colouring.
