= Snubnose snake eel =

Scientific classification
- Kingdom: Animalia
- Phylum: Chordata
- Class: Actinopterygii
- Order: Anguilliformes
- Family: Ophichthidae
- Genus: Ophichthus
- Species: O. brevirostris

Binomial name
- Ophichthus brevirostris McCosker & Ross, 2007

Species of fish

The snubnose snake eel (Ophichthus brevirostris) is an eel in the family Ophichthidae (worm/snake eels). It was described by John E. McCosker and Steve W. Ross in 2007. It is a marine, subtropical eel which is known from North Carolina, USA, in the western central Atlantic Ocean. It dwells at a depth range of 370 to 440 meters (1,210 to 1,440 ft). Females can reach a total length of 29.2 centimeters (11.5 in).

== Name origin ==
The species epithet "brevirostris" means "short muzzle" in Latin, and is treated as a noun in apposition.
