= Ophichthus kunaloa =

Scientific classification
- Kingdom: Animalia
- Phylum: Chordata
- Class: Actinopterygii
- Order: Anguilliformes
- Family: Ophichthidae
- Genus: Ophichthus
- Species: O. kunaloa

Binomial name
- Ophichthus kunaloa J. E. McCosker, 1979

Species of fish

Ophichthus kunaloa is an eel in the family Ophichthidae (worm/snake eels). It was described by John E. McCosker in 1979. It is a marine, temperate water-dwelling eel which is known from the Hawaiian Islands, in the eastern central Pacific Ocean. It dwells at a depth range of 220 to 475 metres (722 to 1,558 ft), and leads a benthic lifestyle, inhabiting fine sand sediments and crevices in harder substrates. Males can reach a maximum total length of 47.3 centimetres (18.6 in).
