= Ophichthus tomioi =

Scientific classification
- Kingdom: Animalia
- Phylum: Chordata
- Class: Actinopterygii
- Order: Anguilliformes
- Family: Ophichthidae
- Genus: Ophichthus
- Species: O. tomioi

Binomial name
- Ophichthus tomioi J. E. McCosker, 2010

Species of fish

Ophichthus tomioi is an eel in the family Ophichthidae (worm/snake eels). It was described by John E. McCosker in 2010. It is a marine, deep water-dwelling eel which is known from the Indo-Pacific, including the Philippines, the Seychelles Islands, Marquesas, and Fiji. It dwells at a depth range of 300 to 423 metres (984 to 1,388 ft). Males can reach a maximum total length of 44.7 centimetres (17.6 in).

== Etymology ==
The species epithet "tomioi" was given in honour of Tomio Iwamoto (b. 1939), an ichthyologist at the California Academy of Sciences. Iwamoto collected the holotype specimen.
