= Ophichthus mystacinus =

Scientific classification
- Kingdom: Animalia
- Phylum: Chordata
- Class: Actinopterygii
- Order: Anguilliformes
- Family: Ophichthidae
- Genus: Ophichthus
- Species: O. mystacinus

Binomial name
- Ophichthus mystacinus J. E. McCosker, 1999

Species of fish

Ophichthus mystacinus is an eel in the family Ophichthidae (worm/snake eels). It was described by John E. McCosker in 1999. It is a marine, deep water-dwelling eel which is known from New Caledonia, in the western Pacific Ocean. It dwells at a depth range of 371 to 824 metres (1,217 to 2,703 ft). Males can reach a maximum total length of 42.9 centimetres (16.9 in).

The species epithet "mystacinus" means "mustachioed" in Greek.
