= Ophichthus ishiyamorum =

Scientific classification
- Domain: Eukaryota
- Kingdom: Animalia
- Phylum: Chordata
- Class: Actinopterygii
- Order: Anguilliformes
- Family: Ophichthidae
- Genus: Ophichthus
- Species: O. ishiyamorum

Binomial name
- Ophichthus ishiyamorum J. E. McCosker, 2010

Species of fish

Ophichthus ishiyamorum is an eel in the family Ophichthidae (worm/snake eels). It was described by John E. McCosker in 2010. It is a marine, deep water-dwelling eel which is known from the Gulf of Aden and Somalia. It dwells at a depth range of 258 to 400 metres (846 to 1,312 ft). Males can reach a maximum total length of 43.7 centimetres (17.2 in).

The species epithet "ishiyamorum" referred to Nelson and Patsy Ishiyama.
