= Ophichthus aniptocheilos =

Scientific classification
- Domain: Eukaryota
- Kingdom: Animalia
- Phylum: Chordata
- Class: Actinopterygii
- Order: Anguilliformes
- Family: Ophichthidae
- Genus: Ophichthus
- Species: O. aniptocheilos

Binomial name
- Ophichthus aniptocheilos J. E. McCosker, 2010

Species of fish

Ophichthus aniptocheilos is an eel in the family Ophichthidae. It was described by John E. McCosker in 2010. It is a marine, deep water-dwelling eel known from Tonga, in the eastern central Pacific Ocean. It dwells at a depth range of 391 to 421 m (1,283 to 1,381 ft). Males can reach a maximum total length of 14.2 cm (5.6 in).

The species epithet aniptocheilos means "unwashed lips" in Greek, and is treated as a noun in apposition. It refers to the colouring of the face.
