= Ophichthus microstictus =

Scientific classification
- Kingdom: Animalia
- Phylum: Chordata
- Class: Actinopterygii
- Order: Anguilliformes
- Family: Ophichthidae
- Genus: Ophichthus
- Species: O. microstictus

Binomial name
- Ophichthus microstictus J. E. McCosker, 2010

Species of fish

Ophichthus microstictus is an eel in the family Ophichthidae (worm/snake eels). It was described by John E. McCosker in 2010. It is a marine, deep water-dwelling eel which is known from the western central Pacific Ocean, including Tonga, Fiji, and New Caledonia. It dwells at a depth range of 362 to 450 metres (1,188 to 1,476 ft). Males can reach a maximum total length of 48.9 centimetres (19.3 in).

The species epithet "microstictus" means "small punctures" in Greek, and is treated as a noun in apposition. It refers to the small pores on the eel's head.
