= Ophichthus exourus =

Scientific classification
- Kingdom: Animalia
- Phylum: Chordata
- Class: Actinopterygii
- Order: Anguilliformes
- Family: Ophichthidae
- Genus: Ophichthus
- Species: O. exourus

Binomial name
- Ophichthus exourus J. E. McCosker, 1999

Species of fish

Ophichthus exourus is an eel in the family Ophichthidae (worm/snake eels). It was described by John E. McCosker in 1999. It is a marine, deep water-dwelling eel which is known from New Caledonia and Fiji, in the western Pacific Ocean. It dwells at a depth range of 400 to 520 metres (1,310 to 1,710 ft). Males can reach a maximum total length of 66.9 centimetres (26.3 in), while females can reach a maximum TL of 59 centimetres (23 in).

The species epithet "exourus" refers to the eel's tapered point.
