= Ophichthus alleni =

Scientific classification
- Kingdom: Animalia
- Phylum: Chordata
- Class: Actinopterygii
- Order: Anguilliformes
- Family: Ophichthidae
- Genus: Ophichthus
- Species: O. alleni

Binomial name
- Ophichthus alleni J. E. McCosker, 2010

Species of fish

Ophichthus alleni is an eel in the family Ophichthidae. It was described by John E. McCosker in 2010. It is a marine, deep water-dwelling eel known from Australia, in the western Pacific Ocean. It dwells at a depth range of 115 to 200 m (377 to 656 ft). Females can reach a maximum total length of 76 cm (30 in).

== Etymology ==
The species epithet alleni refers to Gerald R. Allen.
