= Ophichthus machidai =

Scientific classification
- Kingdom: Animalia
- Phylum: Chordata
- Class: Actinopterygii
- Order: Anguilliformes
- Family: Ophichthidae
- Genus: Ophichthus
- Species: O. machidai

Binomial name
- Ophichthus machidai J. E. McCosker, S. Ide & Endo, 2012

Species of fish

Ophichthus machidai is an eel in the family Ophichthidae (worm/snake eels). It was described by John E. McCosker, S. Ide, and Hiromitsu Endo in 2012.

== Etymology ==
The eel is named in honor of ichthyologist Yoshihiko Machida, who guided Sachiko Ide through her thesis at Kochi University, Kochi, Japan.
