= Indifferent eel =

Conservation status
- Least Concern (IUCN 3.1)

Scientific classification
- Kingdom: Animalia
- Phylum: Chordata
- Class: Actinopterygii
- Order: Anguilliformes
- Family: Ophichthidae
- Genus: Ethadophis
- Species: E. akkistikos

Binomial name
- Ethadophis akkistikos McCosker & J. E. Böhlke, 1984

Species of fish

The Indifferent eel (Ethadophis akkistikos) is a species of eels in the family of Ophichthidae (worm/snake eels). It was first described by John E. McCosker and James Erwin Böhlke in 1984. It is a marine, tropical eel which is known from the western central Atlantic Ocean, including Panama, Nicaragua, Suriname, and Texas, USA. It dwells at a depth range of 55 to 58 meters (180 to 190 ft).

The Indifferent eel is currently listed as Least Concern at the IUCN redlist, due to there being few known specimens, and thereby a lack of certain information on the extent of its distribution and possible threats that it may be faced with.
