= Ophichthus shaoi =

Scientific classification
- Kingdom: Animalia
- Phylum: Chordata
- Class: Actinopterygii
- Order: Anguilliformes
- Family: Ophichthidae
- Genus: Ophichthus
- Species: O. shaoi

Binomial name
- Ophichthus shaoi J. E. McCosker & H. C. Ho, 2015

Species of fish

Ophichthus shaoi, the long-bodied snake eel, is an eel in the family Ophichthidae (worm/snake eels). It is found around Taiwan. This species reaches a length of 62.3 cm (24.5 in).

== Etymology ==
The fish is named in honor of ichthyologist and marine ecologist Kwang-Tsao Shao (b. 1951) of the Biodiversity Research Center, Academia Sinica, Taiwan.
