= Ophichthus congroides =

Scientific classification
- Domain: Eukaryota
- Kingdom: Animalia
- Phylum: Chordata
- Class: Actinopterygii
- Order: Anguilliformes
- Family: Ophichthidae
- Genus: Ophichthus
- Species: O. congroides

Binomial name
- Ophichthus congroides J. E. McCosker, 2010

Species of fish

Ophichthus congroides is an eel in the family Ophichthidae (worm/snake eels). It was described by John E. McCosker in 2010. It is a marine, deep water-dwelling eel which is known from the Tuamotu Islands, in the eastern central Pacific Ocean. It is known to dwell at a depth of 300 metres (980 ft). Males can reach a maximum total length of 52.2 centimetres (20.6 in), while females can reach a maximum TL of 47.2 centimetres (18.6 in).

The species epithet "congroides" refers to the species' similarity in condition of the posterior nostril to that of some members of the family Congridae.
