= Ophichthus lentiginosus =

Scientific classification
- Kingdom: Animalia
- Phylum: Chordata
- Class: Actinopterygii
- Order: Anguilliformes
- Family: Ophichthidae
- Genus: Ophichthus
- Species: O. lentiginosus

Binomial name
- Ophichthus lentiginosus J. E. McCosker, 2010

Species of fish

Ophichthus lentiginosus is an eel in the family Ophichthidae (worm/snake eels). It was described by John E. McCosker in 2010. It is a marine, deep water-dwelling eel which is known from Vanuatu and New Caledonia, in the western central Pacific Ocean. It is known to dwell at a depth of 400 metres (1,300 ft). Males can reach a maximum total length of 62.8 centimetres (24.7 in), while females can reach a maximum TL of 56.3 centimetres (22.2 in).

The species epithet "lentiginosus" means "freckled" in Latin, and refers to the eel's colour pattern.
