= Dark deepwater snake eel =

Scientific classification
- Domain: Eukaryota
- Kingdom: Animalia
- Phylum: Chordata
- Class: Actinopterygii
- Order: Anguilliformes
- Family: Ophichthidae
- Genus: Ophichthus
- Species: O. aphotistos

Binomial name
- Ophichthus aphotistos J. E. McCosker & Y. Y. Chen, 2000

Species of fish

The dark deepwater snake eel (Ophichthus aphotistos) is an eel in the family Ophichthidae. It was described by John E. McCosker and Chen Yu-Yun in 2000. It is a marine, deep water-dwelling eel which is known from Taiwan, in the northwestern Pacific Ocean. It dwells at a depth range of 36–1350 m (most commonly 250–350 m), and inhabits sand and mud. Specimens have been observed in burrows with only their heads exposed, or resting on sediment with their bodies curved in an S shape. Females can reach a maximum total length of 62.8 cm.

The specific epithet aphotistos, meaning dark or obscure, refers both to the eel's appearance and its habitat.
