= Ophichthus obtusus =

Scientific classification
- Domain: Eukaryota
- Kingdom: Animalia
- Phylum: Chordata
- Class: Actinopterygii
- Order: Anguilliformes
- Family: Ophichthidae
- Genus: Ophichthus
- Species: O. obtusus

Binomial name
- Ophichthus obtusus J. E. McCosker, S. Ide & Endo, 2012

Species of fish

Ophichthus obtusus is an eel in the family Ophichthidae (worm/snake eels). It was described by John E. McCosker, S. Ide, and Hiromitsu Endo in 2012.
