= Ophichthus humanni =

Scientific classification
- Kingdom: Animalia
- Phylum: Chordata
- Class: Actinopterygii
- Order: Anguilliformes
- Family: Ophichthidae
- Genus: Ophichthus
- Species: O. humanni

Binomial name
- Ophichthus humanni J. E. McCosker, 2010

Species of fish

Ophichthus humanni is an eel in the family Ophichthidae (worm/snake eels). It was described by John E. McCosker in 2010. It is a marine, deep water-dwelling eel which is known from Vanuatu, in the western Pacific Ocean. It dwells at a depth range of 254 to 300 metres (833 to 984 ft). Males can reach a maximum total length of 66.9 centimetres (26.3 in).

== Etymology ==
The eel is named in honor of author and underwater photographer Paul Humann (b. 1937), who has supplied ichthyologists with his photographs and in the wild observations.
