= Blackfin (disambiguation) =

Blackfin may refer to:

- Blackfin, a family of embedded DSP microprocessors.
- Blackfin cisco, member of the whitefish sub-family.
- Black fin conger, an eel in the family Congridae.
- Blackfin snake eel, or "highfin snake eel" of the family Ophichtidae.
- Blackfin tuna, the smallest tuna species.
- Black-finned anemonefish, of the family Pomacentridae.
- Blue black-finned chub, a species of parrotfish.
- "Black Fin", a 2021 song by Zior Park

== See also ==
- The Black Fins, New Zealand national surf life saving team.
