= Ophichthus hirritus =

Scientific classification
- Kingdom: Animalia
- Phylum: Chordata
- Class: Actinopterygii
- Order: Anguilliformes
- Family: Ophichthidae
- Genus: Ophichthus
- Species: O. hirritus

Binomial name
- Ophichthus hirritus J. E. McCosker, 2010

Species of fish

Ophichthus hirritus is an eel in the family Ophichthidae (worm/snake eels). It was described by John E. McCosker in 2010. It is a marine, deep water-dwelling eel which is known from the Seychelles Islands, in the western Indian Ocean. It is known to dwell at a depth of 600 metres (2,000 ft). Males can reach a maximum total length of 52.8 centimetres (20.8 in), while females can reach a maximum TL of 53.4 centimetres (21.0 in).

The species epithet "hirritus" means "to snarl like a dog" in Latin, and refers to the eel's facial structure.
