= Ophichthus naga =

Scientific classification
- Kingdom: Animalia
- Phylum: Chordata
- Class: Actinopterygii
- Order: Anguilliformes
- Family: Ophichthidae
- Genus: Ophichthus
- Species: O. naga

Binomial name
- Ophichthus naga J. E. McCosker & Psomadakis, 2018

Species of fish

Ophichthus naga, the deepwater demonic snake eel, is an eel in the family Ophichthidae (worm/snake eels). It was collected off Myanmar.

== Etymology ==
The name Nāga, means a seagoing, serpentine dragon-like being in the Buddhist religion that has great powers and are able to swim through the solid earth as if it was water, a behavior not unlike that of ophichthid snake eels.
