= Blackneck (disambiguation) =

Blackneck may refer to:

- Lygephila pastinum, also known commonly as the blackneck, a species of moth
- Blackneck garter snake (Thamnophis cyrtopsis), a species of snake
- Black-necked swan (Cygnus melanocoryphus), a species of bird
- Dark-shouldered snake eel (Ophichthus cephalozona), also known commonly as the black-neck snake eel
