= Ophichthus rotundus =

Scientific classification
- Domain: Eukaryota
- Kingdom: Animalia
- Phylum: Chordata
- Class: Actinopterygii
- Order: Anguilliformes
- Family: Ophichthidae
- Genus: Ophichthus
- Species: O. rotundus

Binomial name
- Ophichthus rotundus Lee & Asano, 1997

Species of eel

Ophichthus rotundus is an eel in the family Ophichthidae (worm/snake eels). It was described by Chung-Lyul Lee and Hirotoshi Asano in 1997. It is a marine, temperate water-dwelling eel which is known from Korea, in the northwestern Pacific Ocean. Males can reach a maximum total length of 79.3 centimeters (31.2 in).
