= Ophichthus manilensis =

Scientific classification
- Domain: Eukaryota
- Kingdom: Animalia
- Phylum: Chordata
- Class: Actinopterygii
- Order: Anguilliformes
- Family: Ophichthidae
- Genus: Ophichthus
- Species: O. manilensis

Binomial name
- Ophichthus manilensis Herre, 1923

Species of fish

Ophichthus manilensis is an eel in the family Ophichthidae (worm/snake eels). It was described by Albert William Herre in 1923. It is a marine, tropical eel which is known from the Philippines, in the western central Pacific Ocean.
