= Ophichthus celebicus =

Scientific classification
- Domain: Eukaryota
- Kingdom: Animalia
- Phylum: Chordata
- Class: Actinopterygii
- Order: Anguilliformes
- Family: Ophichthidae
- Genus: Ophichthus
- Species: O. celebicus

Binomial name
- Ophichthus celebicus (Bleeker, 1856)

Synonyms
- Ophisurus celebicus Bleeker, 1856; Ophichthys celebicus (Bleeker, 1856); Ophichtys celebicus (Bleeker, 1856); Ophisurus broekmeyeri Bleeker, 1856; Ophisurus Broekmeijeri Bleeker, 1856; Ophichthys amboinensis Bleeker, 1864

Species of fish

Ophichthus celebicus is an eel in the family Ophichthidae (worm/snake eels). It was described by Pieter Bleeker in 1856, originally under the genus Ophisurus. It is a marine, tropical eel which is known from the western Pacific Ocean, including India and Hong Kong.
