= Ophichthus stenopterus =

Scientific classification
- Domain: Eukaryota
- Kingdom: Animalia
- Phylum: Chordata
- Class: Actinopterygii
- Order: Anguilliformes
- Family: Ophichthidae
- Genus: Ophichthus
- Species: O. stenopterus

Binomial name
- Ophichthus stenopterus Cope, 1871

Synonyms
- Ophichthys stenopterus Cope, 1871

Species of fish

Ophichthus stenopterus is an eel in the family Ophichthidae (worm/snake eels). It was described by Edward Drinker Cope in 1871. It is a marine, tropical eel which is known from the western central Pacific Ocean.
