= Bigfin snake eel =

Scientific classification
- Domain: Eukaryota
- Kingdom: Animalia
- Phylum: Chordata
- Class: Actinopterygii
- Order: Anguilliformes
- Family: Ophichthidae
- Genus: Ophichthus
- Species: O. macrochir

Binomial name
- Ophichthus macrochir (Bleeker, 1853)

Synonyms
- Ophisurus macrochir Bleeker, 1853; Centrurophis macrochir (Bleeker, 1853)

Species of fish

The bigfin snake eel (Ophichthus macrochir) is an eel in the family Ophichthidae (worm/snake eels). It was described by Pieter Bleeker in 1853. It is a tropical, marine eel which is known from the Indo-Pacific. It dwells at a depth range of 0–25 metres, and inhabits sand and mud. Males can reach a maximum total length of 92 centimetres.
