= Yellow snake eel =

Scientific classification
- Domain: Eukaryota
- Kingdom: Animalia
- Phylum: Chordata
- Class: Actinopterygii
- Order: Anguilliformes
- Family: Ophichthidae
- Genus: Ophichthus
- Species: O. zophochir

Binomial name
- Ophichthus zophochir D. S. Jordan & C. H. Gilbert, 1882

Synonyms
- Ophichthys zophochir Jordan & Gilbert, 1882; Ophichthus chamensis Meek & Hildebrand, 1923

Species of fish

The yellow snake eel (Ophichthus zophochir, also known as the charmed snake eel) is an eel in the family Ophichthidae. It was described by David Starr Jordan and Charles Henry Gilbert in 1882. It is a marine, subtropical eel known from the eastern central and southeastern Pacific Ocean, including Chile, Costa Rica, Colombia, Ecuador, Guatemala, El Salvador, Honduras, Nicaragua, Mexico, Panama, Peru, and the United States. It dwells at a depth range of 1 to 110 m (3.3 to 360.9 ft), and forms burrows in rocky and sandy regions. Males can reach a maximum total length of 98 cm (39 in), but more commonly reach a length of 50 cm (20 in).

The species epithet zophochir, derived from the Greek term for "dark hand", refers to the dark colouring of the eel's pectoral fin. Its diet consists of bony fish and clams. Due to its wide distribution in the eastern Pacific, lack of known threats, and lack of observed population decline, the IUCN redlist currently lists the yellow snake-eel as Least Concern.
