= Ophichthus tchangi =

Scientific classification
- Domain: Eukaryota
- Kingdom: Animalia
- Phylum: Chordata
- Class: Actinopterygii
- Order: Anguilliformes
- Family: Ophichthidae
- Genus: Ophichthus
- Species: O. tchangi

Binomial name
- Ophichthus tchangi W. Q. Tang & C. G. Zhang, 2002

Species of fish

Ophichthus tchangi is an eel in the family Ophichthidae (worm/snake eels). It was described by Tang Wen-Qiao and Zhang Chun-Guang in 2002. It is a marine, subtropical eel which is known from the eastern China Sea, in the northwestern Pacific Ocean.
