= Ophichthus fasciatus =

Scientific classification
- Domain: Eukaryota
- Kingdom: Animalia
- Phylum: Chordata
- Class: Actinopterygii
- Order: Anguilliformes
- Family: Ophichthidae
- Genus: Ophichthus
- Species: O. fasciatus

Binomial name
- Ophichthus fasciatus (Y. T. Chu, H. L. Wu & X. B. Jin, 1981)

Synonyms
- Microdonophis fasciatus Chu, Wu & Jin, 1981

Species of fish

Ophichthus fasciatus is an eel in the family Ophichthidae (worm/snake eels). It was described by Chu Yuan-Ting and Jin Xin-Bo in 1981, originally under the genus Microdonophis. It is a marine, subtropical eel which is known from the northwestern Pacific Ocean, including China and the Peng-hu Islands. Males can reach a maximum total length of 11.5 centimetres (4.5 in).
