= Gymnothorax eurygnathos =

Conservation status
- Data Deficient (IUCN 3.1)

Scientific classification
- Kingdom: Animalia
- Phylum: Chordata
- Class: Actinopterygii
- Order: Anguilliformes
- Family: Muraenidae
- Genus: Gymnothorax
- Species: G. eurygnathos

Binomial name
- Gymnothorax eurygnathos E. B. Böhlke, 2001

Species of fish

Gymnothorax eurygnathos is a moray eel found in the eastern central Pacific Ocean, around the Gulf of California. It was first named by Eugenia B. Böhlke in 2001.
