= Death-banded snake eel =

Scientific classification
- Domain: Eukaryota
- Kingdom: Animalia
- Phylum: Chordata
- Class: Actinopterygii
- Order: Anguilliformes
- Family: Ophichthidae
- Genus: Ophichthus
- Species: O. frontalis

Binomial name
- Ophichthus frontalis Garman, 1899

Synonyms
- Ophichthys frontalis Garman, 1899

Species of fish

The death-banded snake eel (Ophichthus frontalis) is an eel in the family Ophichthidae (worm/snake eels). It was described by Samuel Garman in 1899. It is a tropical, marine eel which is known from the eastern central and southeastern Pacific Ocean, including the central Gulf of California, Colombia, Costa Rica, Mexico and Panama. It dwells at a depth range of 35–760 metres, and forms burrows in sandy and muddy bottoms. Males can reach a maximum total length of 86 centimetres.

The species epithet "frontalis" is presumed to be derived from the Latin term for "forehead". Due to its relatively wide distribution in the eastern Pacific region, lack of known threats, and lack of observed population decline, the IUCN redlist currently lists the Death-banded snake-eel as Least Concern.
