= King snake eel =

Scientific classification
- Kingdom: Animalia
- Phylum: Chordata
- Class: Actinopterygii
- Order: Anguilliformes
- Family: Ophichthidae
- Genus: Ophichthus
- Species: O. rex

Binomial name
- Ophichthus rex J. E. Böhlke & J. H. Caruso, 1980

Species of fish

The king snake eel (Ophichthus rex) is an eel in the family Ophichthidae (worm/snake eels). It was described by James Erwin Böhlke and John H. Caruso in 1980. It is a marine, tropical eel which is known from Florida to Texas, USA, in the northern Gulf of Mexico in the western Atlantic Ocean. It dwells at a depth range of 15 to 365 meters (49 to 1,198 ft), and inhabits offshore waters. King snake eels can reach a total length of 211 centimeters (83 in); the maximum recorded weight is 23.6 kilograms (52 lb). caught by Patrick Lemire on the Texsun II out of Galveston, Texas, in 1997.

The King snake eel is often caught near oil platforms by anglers.This eel is sometimes also referred to as "giant snake eel", mud eel (in reference to their preferred burrowing substrate), slime eel, worm eel, and keoghfish.

The name rex is from the Latin word meaning king. It is believed to be named this for the large size that the species is known for.

== Description ==
Dark, partial banding starts from behind the head of the fish all the way to the tail. Most specimens have 14-15 bands across their body, that stops at the lateral line. The dorsal side is a sandy yellowish-brown colour with dark olive-brown bands that become darker towards the tail. The ventral side is white with a harsh transition from dorsal to ventral, occurring around halfway down the side. There appears to be little to no difference between male and female eels.

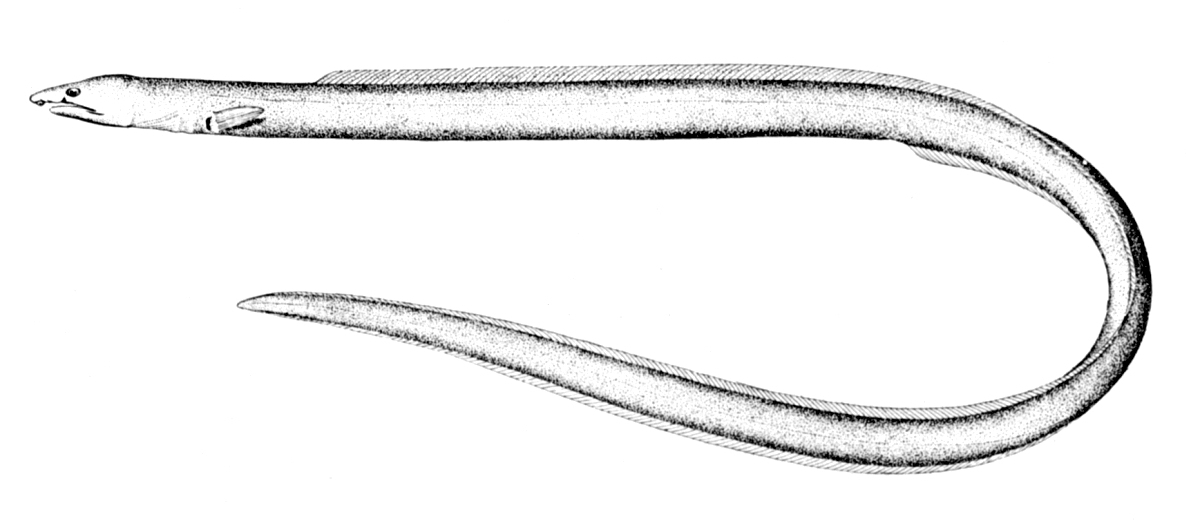
Specimen of Ophichthus species

Eels can reach over 2 meters (2.26m) in length and weigh up to 18 kg. Both dorsal and anal fins are present, with the dorsal fin beginning well after the pectoral fin and the anal fin originating shortly after the anal opening. The gill opening is semicircular and placed right before the base of the pectoral fin. In males and smaller females, the circular premaxillary patch has a ring of teeth with none in the center. In larger females, the central area is filled with teeth. There are numerous round and oval depressions that are close together all over the fish, that sometimes deepen into pits.

== Distribution and habitat ==
The king snake eel is native to the Gulf of Mexico, with a range extending from the Yucatán Peninsula to the Florida Keys. They are bottom dwellers, preferring muddy/silt habitat compared to sand habitats. It dwells at a depth range of 15 to 365 meters (49 to 1,198 ft) and inhabits offshore waters. Not much is known about the species life history due to their elusiveness as adults. Most specimen appear as bycatch for fishermen.

== Biology ==
The king snake eel is a dioecious and oviparous species, meaning they produce egg(s) and are either male or female for their entire lives. They fertilize externally by spawning. The specific time for this species spawning season is not known but is theorized to be around December–April. Females of this species are usually larger than the males.

The limited literature surrounding this species suggests that while they are a burrowing species, they do not form permeant burrows and mainly burrow to hide from predators or search for food. While adults, the King snake eels prefer to inhabit the gulfs continental shelf. In their larval stage, it is believed they prefer deeper waters of more than 1000m.

== Conservation status ==
Little is known about the king snake eel on account for its cryptic adult lifestyle and a lack of interest in it from fisheries. It briefly picked up interest from fishermen and researchers as a possible food source but was discarded on account for the numerous small bones throughout the fillet. It is a common bycatch for many fishermen trying to catch groupers or snappers. It is classified as "least concern" on the IUCN red list since being assessed in 2011.

There was an increase in research on King snake eel after the Deepwater Horizon oil spill in 2010, with many researchers studying the effects of polycyclic aromatic hydrocarbons (PAHs) on the species. According to a research article in 2015, the king snake eel habitat had an 82% overlap with the area affected by the Deepwater Horizon blowout, putting this species potentially at great risk. The researchers found that the king snake eel species was barely affected by PAHs on account of their ability to eliminate the substance through their mucus.
