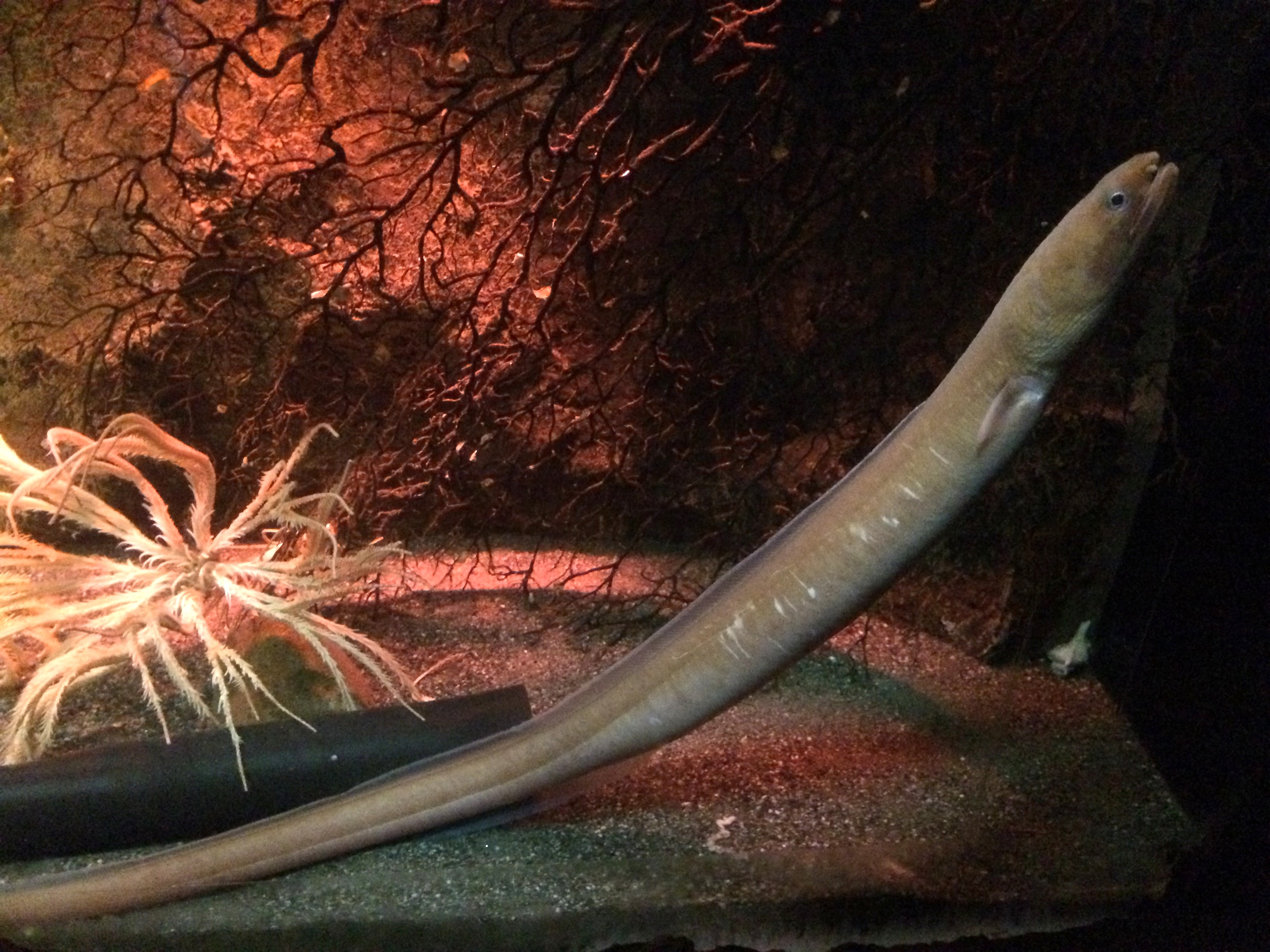

Scientific classification
- Domain: Eukaryota
- Kingdom: Animalia
- Phylum: Chordata
- Class: Actinopterygii
- Order: Anguilliformes
- Family: Ophichthidae
- Genus: Ophichthus
- Species: O. urolophus

Binomial name
- Ophichthus urolophus (Temminck & Schlegel, 1846)

Synonyms
- Conger urolophus Temminck & Schlegel, 1846

= Manetail snake eel =

Species of fish

The manetail snake eel (Ophichthus urolophus) is an eel in the family Ophichthidae (worm/snake eels). It was described by Coenraad Jacob Temminck and Hermann Schlegel in 1846, originally under the genus Conger. It is a marine, tropical eel which is known from the Indo-Pacific. It inhabits deep waters, but is found in muddy sediments in shallow waters on rare occasions. Males can reach a maximum total length of 61.5 centimetres (24.2 in).

The manetail snake eel's diet consists of benthic invertebrates.
