= Ophichthus leonensis =

Scientific classification
- Kingdom: Animalia
- Phylum: Chordata
- Class: Actinopterygii
- Order: Anguilliformes
- Family: Ophichthidae
- Genus: Ophichthus
- Species: O. leonensis

Binomial name
- Ophichthus leonensis Blache, 1975

Species of fish

Ophichthus leonensis is an eel in the family Ophichthidae (worm/snake eels). It was described by Jacques Blache. It is a marine, deep water-dwelling eel which is known from a single specimen found in the stomach of a fish taken from a depth of 180 metres (590 ft) in Sierra Leone, in the eastern Atlantic Ocean. It is presumed to form burrows in sand or mud, as is common amongst eels. Males are known to reach a total length of 23.2 centimetres (9.1 in).
