= Ophichthus limkouensis =

Scientific classification
- Kingdom: Animalia
- Phylum: Chordata
- Class: Actinopterygii
- Order: Anguilliformes
- Family: Ophichthidae
- Genus: Ophichthus
- Species: O. limkouensis

Binomial name
- Ophichthus limkouensis Chen, 1929

Synonyms
- Ophichthys limkouensis Chen, 1929

Species of fish

Ophichthus limkouensis is an eel in the family Ophichthidae (worm/snake eels). It was described by Johnson T. F. Chen in 1929. It is a marine, tropical eel which is known from the western central Pacific Ocean.
