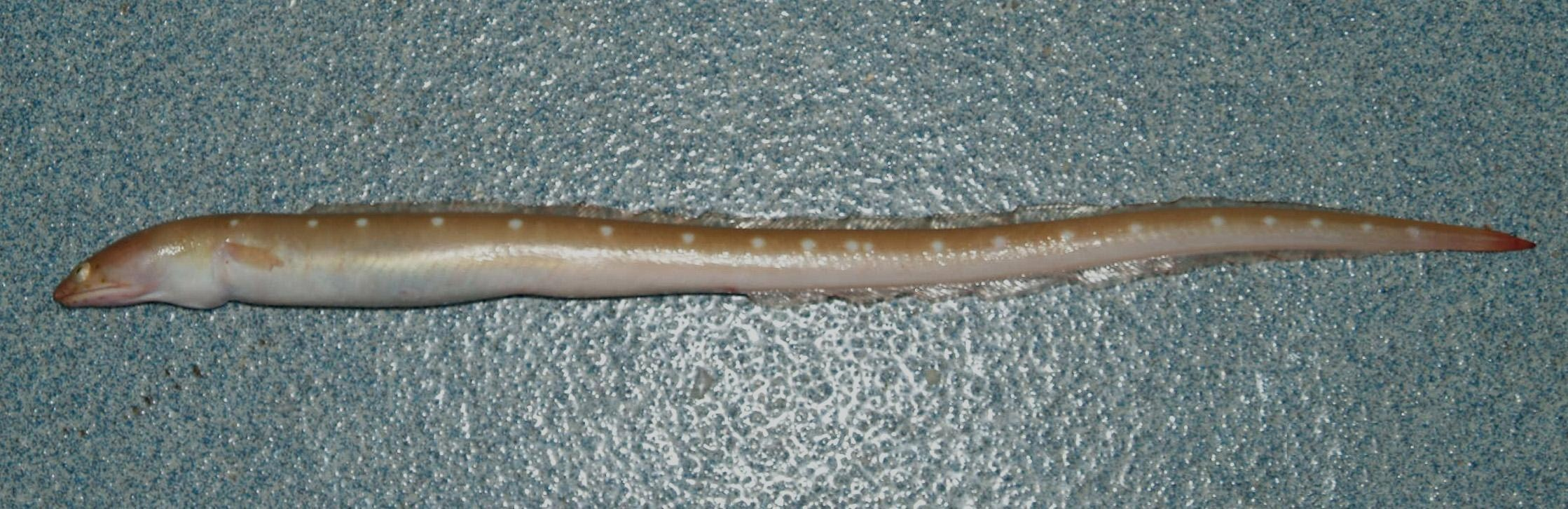

Scientific classification
- Domain: Eukaryota
- Kingdom: Animalia
- Phylum: Chordata
- Class: Actinopterygii
- Order: Anguilliformes
- Family: Ophichthidae
- Genus: Ophichthus
- Species: O. puncticeps

Binomial name
- Ophichthus puncticeps (Kaup, 1859)

Synonyms
- Cryptopterus puncticeps Kaup, 1859; Ophichthys guttifer Bean & Dresel, 1884; Ophichthys retropinnis Eigenmann, 1887

= Palespotted eel =

Species of fish

The palespotted eel (Ophichthus puncticeps) is an eel in the family Ophichthidae (worm/snake eels). It was described by Johann Jakob Kaup in 1859, originally under the genus Cryptopterus. It is a marine, tropical eel which is known from the western Atlantic Ocean, including North Carolina, USA, the northeastern Gulf of Mexico, and Brazil. It dwells at a depth range of 0 to 150 meters (0 to 492 ft), most often at around 5 to 40 meters (16 to 131 ft). Males can reach a maximum total length of 81 centimeters (32 in), but more commonly reach a TL of 60 centimeters (24 in).
