= Ophichthus roseus =

Scientific classification
- Domain: Eukaryota
- Kingdom: Animalia
- Phylum: Chordata
- Class: Actinopterygii
- Order: Anguilliformes
- Family: Ophichthidae
- Genus: Ophichthus
- Species: O. roseus

Binomial name
- Ophichthus roseus Tanaka, 1917

Species of fish

Ophichthus roseus is an eel in the family Ophichthidae (worm/snake eels). It was described by Shigeho Tanaka in 1917. It is a marine, tropical eel which is known from the western Pacific Ocean.
