= Shorthead snake eel =

Scientific classification
- Domain: Eukaryota
- Kingdom: Animalia
- Phylum: Chordata
- Class: Actinopterygii
- Order: Anguilliformes
- Family: Ophichthidae
- Genus: Ophichthus
- Species: O. marginatus

Binomial name
- Ophichthus marginatus (Peters, 1855)

Synonyms
- Ophiurus marginatus Peters, 1855

Species of fish

The shorthead snake eel (Ophichthus marginatus) is an eel in the family Ophichthidae (worm/snake eels). It was described by Wilhelm Peters in 1855, originally under the genus Ophiurus. It is a marine, tropical eel which is known from the western Indian Ocean, including Aldabra and Mozambique. Its range was once reported to include Knysna, South Africa, but the specimen on which this claim was based has disappeared. Males can reach a maximum total length of 47 centimetres (19 in).
