= Ophichthus maculatus =

Scientific classification
- Domain: Eukaryota
- Kingdom: Animalia
- Phylum: Chordata
- Class: Actinopterygii
- Order: Anguilliformes
- Family: Ophichthidae
- Genus: Ophichthus
- Species: O. maculatus

Binomial name
- Ophichthus maculatus (Rafinesque, 1810)

Species of fish

Ophichthus maculatus is an eel in the family Ophichthidae (worm/snake eels). It was described by Rafinesque in 1810.
