= Wrinkled snake eel =

Scientific classification
- Domain: Eukaryota
- Kingdom: Animalia
- Phylum: Chordata
- Class: Actinopterygii
- Order: Anguilliformes
- Family: Ophichthidae
- Genus: Ophichthus
- Species: O. rugifer

Binomial name
- Ophichthus rugifer Jordan & Bollman, 1890

Synonyms
- Ophichthys biserialis Garman, 1899

Species of fish

The wrinkled snake eel (Ophichthus rugifer) is an eel in the family Ophichthidae (worm/snake eels). It was described by David Starr Jordan and Charles Harvey Bollman in 1890. It is a marine, tropical eel which is known from the eastern central and southeastern Pacific Ocean, including the Galapagos Islands and the Cocos Islands. It is also speculated to occur in Malpelo Island. It is known to dwell at a depth of 200 metres (660 ft), and inhabits sediments of sand and rubble. Males can reach a maximum total length of 68 centimetres (27 in).

The species epithet "rugifer" is Latin in origin, and refers to the longitudinal striations that can be easily observed on larger specimens. Due to a lack of known threats and observed population decline, the IUCN redlist currently lists the Wrinkled snake-eel as Least Concern.
