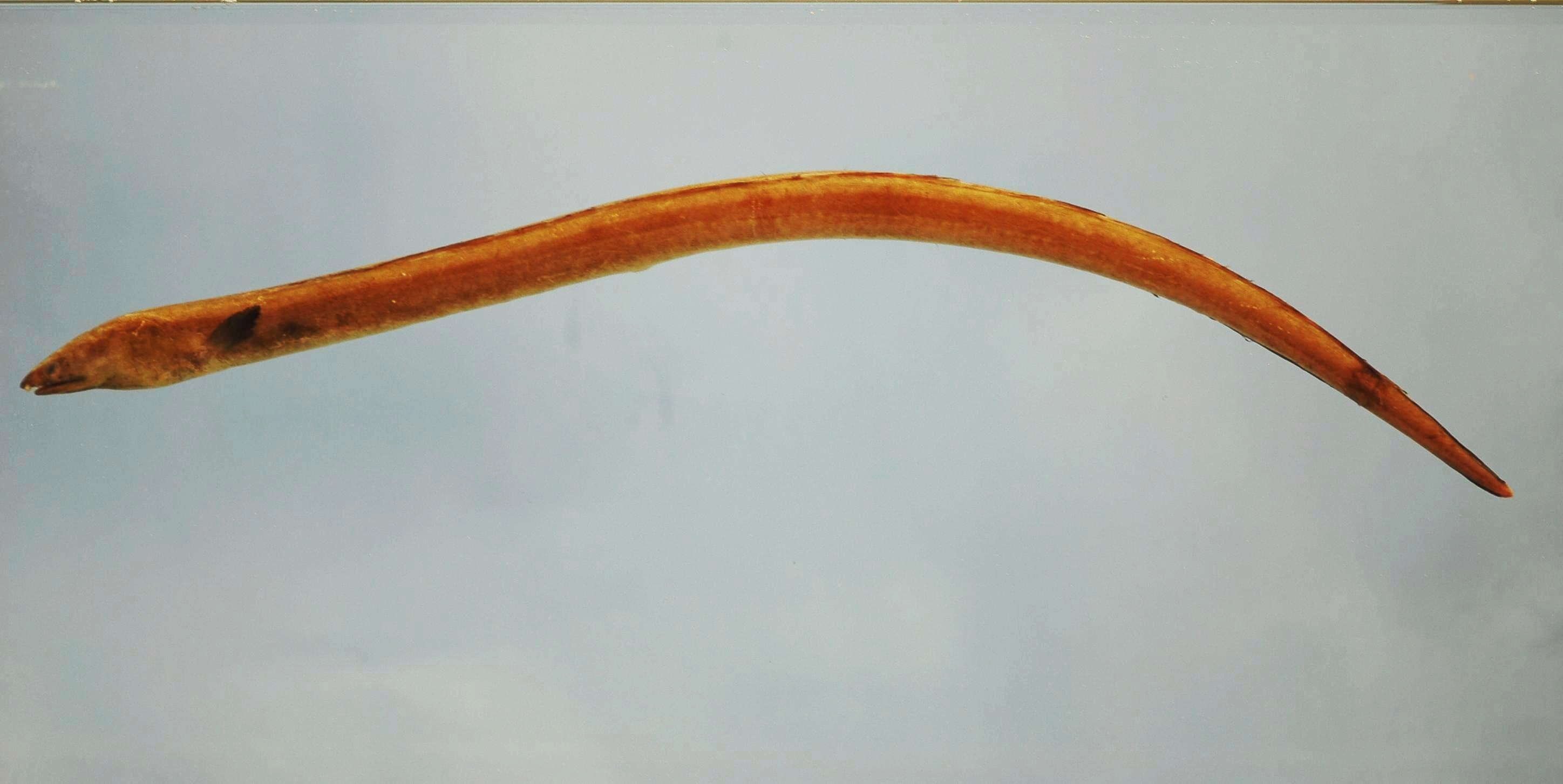

Scientific classification
- Kingdom: Animalia
- Phylum: Chordata
- Class: Actinopterygii
- Order: Anguilliformes
- Family: Ophichthidae
- Genus: Ophichthus
- Species: O. gomesii

Binomial name
- Ophichthus gomesii (Castelnau, 1855)

= Shrimp eel =

Species of fish

The shrimp eel (Ophichthus gomesii) is an eel in the family Ophichthidae (worm/snake eels). It was described by Francis de Laporte de Castelnau in 1855. It is a common inshore species of eel usually found in the shallow Gulf of Mexico and the high-salinity bays where it inhabits muddy habitats.

== Characteristics ==
The shrimp eel has an elongate body and snake-like shape characteristic of the eels. Individuals are colored brown to gray on their dorsal side with lighter coloration below. Their branchial region (ventral side behind the head) is swollen with a basket-like structure of over-lapping free rays (jugostegalia) underneath the skin but they are often visible through the skin. The tail is fleshy with no caudal or pelvic fins. The common length of an adult is 50 centimeters. The maximum length collected is 91.4 centimeters.

Shrimp eels can be distinguished from other eels by their lack of a caudal fin and external jugostegalia (basket-like structure of over-lapping free rays). It can also be distinguished from other snake eels by its lack of markings, well-developed pectoral fin, and dorsal fin originating behind the gill slit.

== Distribution ==
Shrimp eels are distributed along the Western Atlantic from Canada to Massachusetts and the northern Gulf of Mexico to southern Brazil. They are absent in the Bahamas and most of the Caribbean islands.

== Habitat ==
Shrimp eels habitat gulfs and bays in sandy or muddy waters. Their depth range is between 1–450 meters.

== Importance to humans ==
The shrimp is the most common eel in Florida shrimp grounds, although they are rarely consumed.
