= Ophichthus asakusae =

Scientific classification
- Domain: Eukaryota
- Kingdom: Animalia
- Phylum: Chordata
- Class: Actinopterygii
- Order: Anguilliformes
- Family: Ophichthidae
- Genus: Ophichthus
- Species: O. asakusae

Binomial name
- Ophichthus asakusae D. S. Jordan & Snyder, 1901

Species of fish

Ophichthus asakusae is an eel in the family Ophichthidae (worm/snake eels). It was described by David Starr Jordan and John Otterbein Snyder in 1901. It is a marine, temperate water-dwelling eel which is known from Japan, in the northwestern Pacific Ocean. Males can reach a maximum total length of 70 centimetres (28 in).

== Etymology ==
The fish is named in honor of the Asakusa Aquarium in Tokyo, Japan, which supplied the holotype.
