= Ethadophis foresti =

Scientific classification
- Domain: Eukaryota
- Kingdom: Animalia
- Phylum: Chordata
- Class: Actinopterygii
- Order: Anguilliformes
- Family: Ophichthidae
- Genus: Ethadophis
- Species: E. foresti

Binomial name
- Ethadophis foresti (Cadenat & Roux, 1964)

Synonyms
- Sphagebranchus foresti Cadenat & Roux, 1964; Apterichtus foresti (Cadenat & Roux, 1964); Microrhynchus foresti (Cadenat & Roux, 1964)

Species of fish

Ethadophis foresti is an eel in the family Ophichthidae (worm/snake eels). It was described by Jean Cadenat and Charles Roux in 1964. It is a marine, deep water-dwelling eel which is endemic to Cape Verde, in the eastern Atlantic Ocean. It dwells at a depth range of 25–30 metres, and inhabits the continental shelf, where it forms burrows in mud or sand. Males can reach a maximum total length of 32.1 centimetres.
