= Ophichthus brasiliensis =

Scientific classification
- Domain: Eukaryota
- Kingdom: Animalia
- Phylum: Chordata
- Class: Actinopterygii
- Order: Anguilliformes
- Family: Ophichthidae
- Genus: Ophichthus
- Species: O. brasiliensis

Binomial name
- Ophichthus brasiliensis (Kaup, 1856)

Synonyms
- Centrurophis brasiliensis Kaup, 1856

Species of fish

Ophichthus brasiliensis is an eel in the family Ophichthidae (worm/snake eels). It was described by Johann Jakob Kaup in 1856, originally under the genus Centrurophis. It is a marine, tropical eel which is known from Brazil, in the southwestern Atlantic Ocean (from which its species epithet is derived).
