= Ophichthus macrops =

Scientific classification
- Domain: Eukaryota
- Kingdom: Animalia
- Phylum: Chordata
- Class: Actinopterygii
- Order: Anguilliformes
- Family: Ophichthidae
- Genus: Ophichthus
- Species: O. macrops

Binomial name
- Ophichthus macrops Günther, 1910

Synonyms
- Ophichthys macrops Günther, 1910

Species of fish

Ophichthus macrops is an eel in the family Ophichthidae (worm/snake eels). It was described by Albert Günther in 1910. It is a marine, tropical eel which is known from the western central Pacific Ocean.
