= Ophichthus longicorpus =

Scientific classification
- Kingdom: Animalia
- Phylum: Chordata
- Class: Actinopterygii
- Order: Anguilliformes
- Family: Ophichthidae
- Genus: Ophichthus
- Species: O. longicorpus

Binomial name
- Ophichthus longicorpus (V. Q. Vo & H.-C. Ho, 2021)

Species of eel

Ophichthus longicorpus is an eel in the family Ophichthidae (worm/snake eels). It is found in Lương Sơn, Nha Trang, Vietnam.

The name means longus = long; corpus = body, referring to its long trunk (4.1‒4.9 times HL).
