= Ophichthus serpentinus =

Scientific classification
- Domain: Eukaryota
- Kingdom: Animalia
- Phylum: Chordata
- Class: Actinopterygii
- Order: Anguilliformes
- Family: Ophichthidae
- Genus: Ophichthus
- Species: O. serpentinus

Binomial name
- Ophichthus serpentinus Seale, 1917

Synonyms
- Ophichthys serpentinus Seale, 1917; Ophichthus karreri Blache, 1975; Ophichthus bennettai McCosker, 1986

Species of fish

Ophichthus serpentinus, known commonly as the slender snake-eel in South Africa, is an eel in the family Ophichthidae (worm/snake eels). It was described by Alvin Seale in 1917. It is a marine, subtropical eel which is known from the southeastern Atlantic Ocean, including Namibia and South Africa. It dwells at a depth range of 235 to 490 metres (771 to 1,608 ft). Males can reach a maximum total length of 68 centimetres (27 in).
