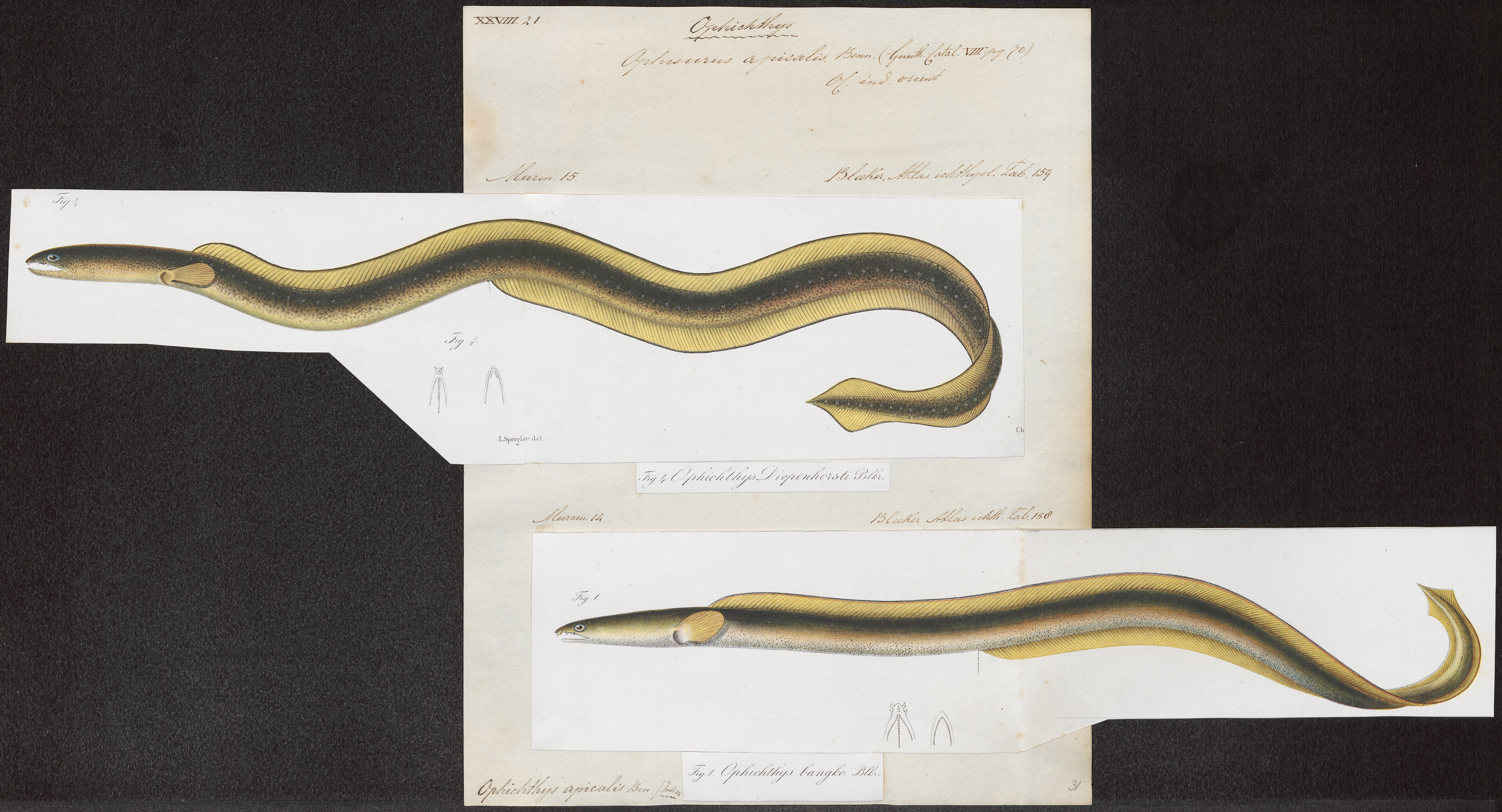

Scientific classification
- Domain: Eukaryota
- Kingdom: Animalia
- Phylum: Chordata
- Class: Actinopterygii
- Order: Anguilliformes
- Family: Ophichthidae
- Genus: Ophichthus
- Species: O. apicalis

Binomial name
- Ophichthus apicalis (Anonymous [Bennett], 1830)

Synonyms
- Ophisurus apicalis Anonymous [Bennett], 1830; Ophichthys apicalis (Anonymous [Bennett], 1830); Ophisurus spadiceus Richardson, 1846; Ophisurus compar Richardson, 1848; Ophisurus bangko Bleeker, 1853; Ophichthus bangko (Bleeker, 1853); Ophisurus diepenhorsti Bleeker, 1860

= Bluntnose snake eel =

Species of fish

The bluntnose snake eel (Ophichthus apicalis, also known commonly as the pointed-tail snake-eel) is an eel in the family Ophichthidae (worm or snake eels). The author of the species is anonymous, but it has been referred to Edward Turner Bennett in 1830. It is a tropical, marine eel which is known from the Indo-Pacific, including Kenya, Madagascar, South Africa, Taiwan, Thailand, and the Philippines. It dwells at a maximum depth of 22 m, but also frequents shores. Males can reach a maximum total length of 45 cm.
