= Ophichthus brachynotopterus =

Scientific classification
- Kingdom: Animalia
- Phylum: Chordata
- Class: Actinopterygii
- Order: Anguilliformes
- Family: Ophichthidae
- Genus: Ophichthus
- Species: O. brachynotopterus

Binomial name
- Ophichthus brachynotopterus Karrer, 1982

Species of fish

Ophichthus brachynotopterus is an eel in the family Ophichthidae (worm/snake eels). It was described by Christine Karrer in 1983. It is a marine, deep water-dwelling eel which is known from Madagascar, in the western Indian Ocean. It dwells at a depth range 355 to 580 metres (1,165 to 1,903 ft). Males can reach a maximum total length of 41.6 centimetres (16.4 in).
