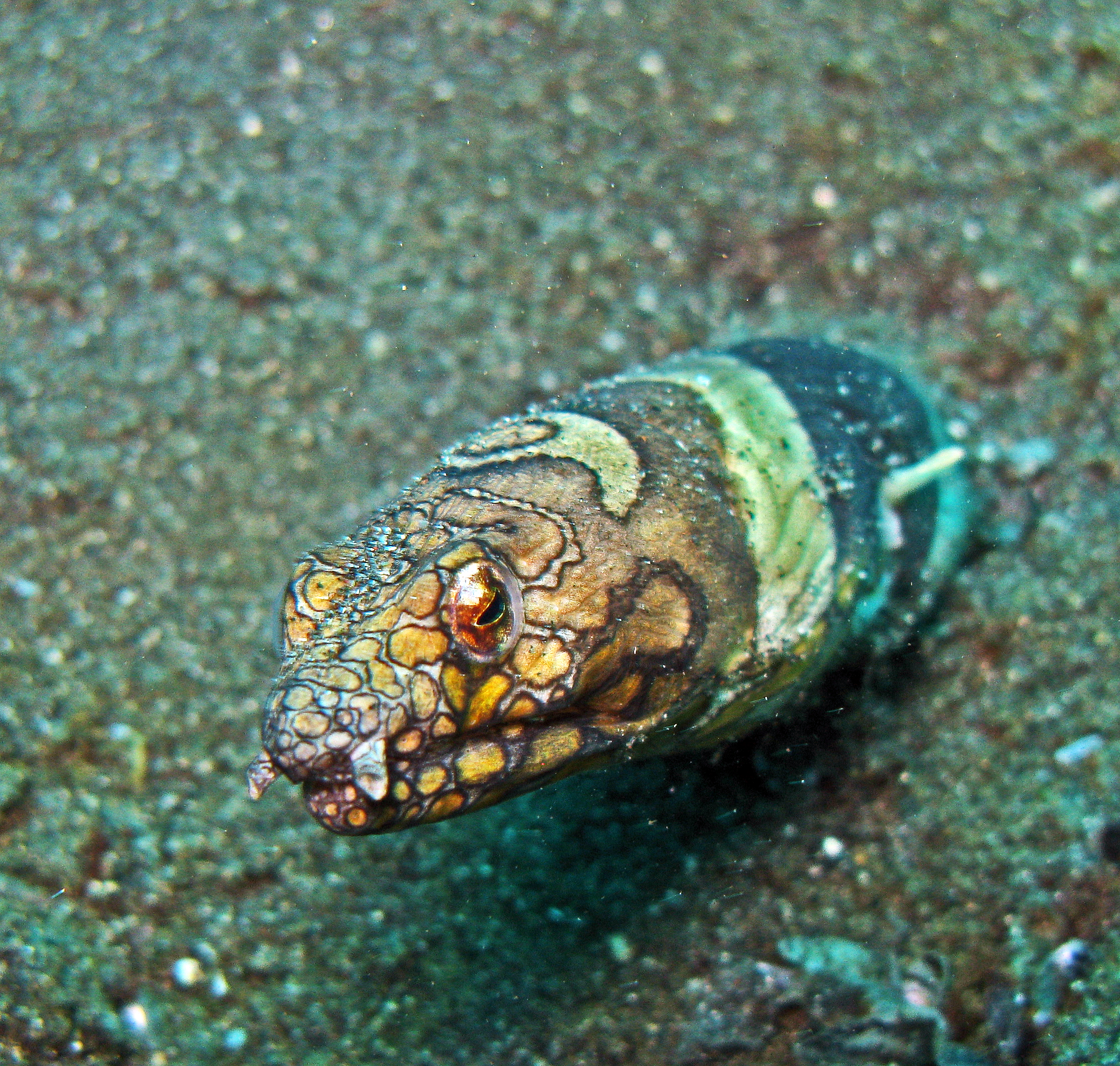

Scientific classification
- Kingdom: Animalia
- Phylum: Chordata
- Class: Actinopterygii
- Order: Anguilliformes
- Family: Ophichthidae
- Genus: Ophichthus
- Species: O. bonaparti

Binomial name
- Ophichthus bonaparti (Kaup, 1856)

Synonyms
- Poecilocephalus bonaparti Kaup, 1856; Ophichthys bonaparti (Kaup, 1856); Ophichthys bonapartii (Kaup, 1856); Ophichthys episcopus Castelnau, 1878; Ophichthus episcopus Castelnau, 1878; Ophichthys garretti Günther, 1910; Ophichthus garretti Günther, 1910

= Napoleon snake eel =

Species of fish

The Napoleon snake eel (Ophichthus bonaparti, also known as the Napoleon eel, the Purplebanded snake eel, or the Saddled snake-eel) is an eel in the family Ophichthidae (worm/snake eels). It was described by Johann Jakob Kaup in 1856, originally under the genus Poecilocephalus. It is a marine, tropical eel which is known from the Indo-Pacific, including Durban, South Africa, Mauritius, Indonesia, Japan, Australia, and the Penghu Islands. It is known to dwell at a depth of 20 metres (66 ft), and inhabits lagoons and reefs; it forms solitary burrows in sand sediments. Males can reach a maximum total length of 75 centimetres (30 in).

== Etymology ==
The fish is named in honor of biologist Charles Lucien Bonaparte (1803-1857), who supplied the type specimen.
