= Rufus snake eel =

Scientific classification
- Kingdom: Animalia
- Phylum: Chordata
- Class: Actinopterygii
- Order: Anguilliformes
- Family: Ophichthidae
- Genus: Ophichthus
- Species: O. rufus

Binomial name
- Ophichthus rufus (Rafinesque, 1810)

Synonyms
- Echelus rufus Rafinesque, 1810; Centrurophis remicaudus Kaup, 1856; Ophichthus remicaudus (Kaup, 1856); Ophisurus hispanus Bellotti, 1858

Species of fish

The rufus snake eel (Ophichthus rufus) is an eel in the family Ophichthidae (worm/snake eels). It was described by Constantine Samuel Rafinesque in 1810, originally under the genus Echelus. It is a marine, subtropical eel which is known from throughout the Mediterranean and the Black Sea, in the northeastern Atlantic Ocean, including Algeria, Albania, Croatia, Egypt, France, Cyprus, Gibraltar, Greece, Italy, Israel, Montenegro, Lebanon, Libya, Malta, Morocco, Monaco, Slovenia, Spain, Tunisia, the Syrian Arab Republic, and Turkey. It inhabits mud sediments on the continental shelf. Males can reach a maximum total length of 60 centimetres (24 in).

The rufus snake-eel's diet consists of bony fish, mollusks and benthic crustaceans. It has been recorded spawning from July to October, in the Mediterranean. Due to its wide distribution and abundant population, as well as a lack of known major threats, the IUCN redlist currently lists the rufus snake-eel as Least Concern
