= Ophichthus vietnamensis =

Scientific classification
- Domain: Eukaryota
- Kingdom: Animalia
- Phylum: Chordata
- Class: Actinopterygii
- Order: Anguilliformes
- Family: Ophichthidae
- Genus: Ophichthus
- Species: O. vietnamensis

Binomial name
- Ophichthus vietnamensis V. Q. Vo, Y. Hibino & H. C. Ho, 2019

Species of fish

Ophichthus vietnamensis is an eel in the family Ophichthidae (worm/snake eels). It is found on the central Vietnamese coast. This species reaches a length of 38 cm (15 in).
