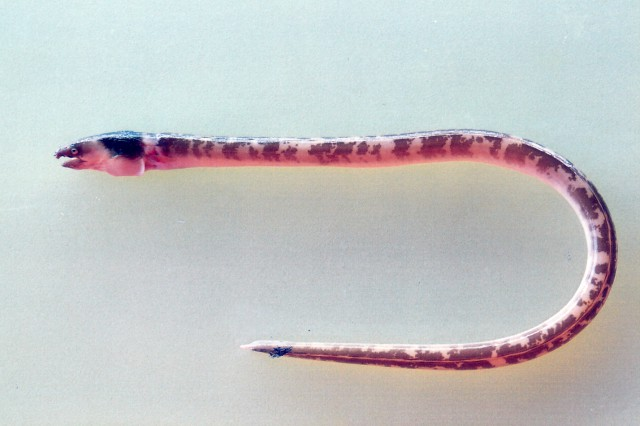

Scientific classification
- Domain: Eukaryota
- Kingdom: Animalia
- Phylum: Chordata
- Class: Actinopterygii
- Order: Anguilliformes
- Family: Ophichthidae
- Genus: Ophichthus
- Species: O. lithinus

Binomial name
- Ophichthus lithinus (D. S. Jordan & R. E. Richardson, 1908)

Synonyms
- Leiuranus lithinus Jordan & Richardson, 1908; Ophichthus evermanni Jordan & Richardson, 1909; Ophichthys evermani (Jordan & Richardson, 1909)

= Evermann's snake eel =

Species of fish

The Evermann's snake eel (Ophichthus lithinus) is an eel in the family Ophichthidae (worm/snake eels). It was described by David Starr Jordan and Robert Earl Richardson in 1908. It is a marine, tropical eel which is known from the western Pacific Ocean. It inhabits inshore soft bottoms.
