= Ophichthus singapurensis =

Scientific classification
- Domain: Eukaryota
- Kingdom: Animalia
- Phylum: Chordata
- Class: Actinopterygii
- Order: Anguilliformes
- Family: Ophichthidae
- Genus: Ophichthus
- Species: O. singapurensis

Binomial name
- Ophichthus singapurensis Bleeker, 1864–65

Synonyms
- Ophichthys singapurensis Bleeker, 1864–65

Species of fish

Ophichthus singapurensis is an eel in the family Ophichthidae (worm/snake eels). It was described by Pieter Bleeker in either 1864 or 1865. It is a marine, tropical eel endemic to Singapore. However, it is also possibly found in Thailand.
