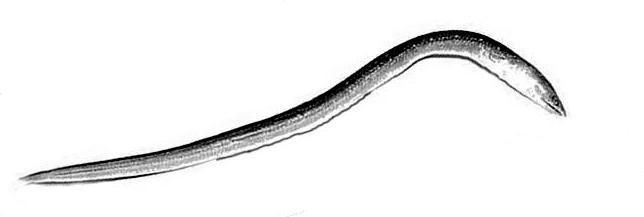

Scientific classification
- Domain: Eukaryota
- Kingdom: Animalia
- Phylum: Chordata
- Class: Actinopterygii
- Order: Anguilliformes
- Family: Ophichthidae
- Genus: Ophichthus
- Species: O. remiger

Binomial name
- Ophichthus remiger (Valenciennes, 1837)

Synonyms
- Ophisurus remiger Valenciennes, 1837; Ophisurus dicellurus Richardson, 1845; Ophichthus dicellurus (Richardson, 1845); Ophisurus ramiger Valenciennes, 1847; Ophichthus ramiger (Valenciennes, 1847); Ophichthys ater Peters, 1866; Ophichthus ater (Peters, 1866); Ophichthys pacifici Günther, 1870; Ophichthus pacifici Günther, 1870; Ophichthys callaensis Günther, 1873; Ophichthus callaensis Günther, 1873; Ophichthys uniserialis Cope, 1877; Ophichthys exilis Seale, 1917

= Punctuated snake eel =

Species of fish

The punctuated snake eel (Ophichthus remiger, also known as the common snake eel in Peru) is an eel in the family Ophichthidae (worm/snake eels). It was described by Achille Valenciennes in 1837, originally under the genus Ophisurus. It is a marine, subtropical eel which is known from the eastern central and southeastern Pacific Ocean, including Nicaragua, Chile, Colombia, Costa Rica, Ecuador, Peru, and Panama. It dwells at a depth range of 15 to 277 metres (49 to 909 ft), and inhabits sand and mud sediments. Males can reach a maximum total length of 85 centimetres (33 in), but more commonly reach a TL of 60 centimetres (24 in).

The species epithet "remniger" refers to the type locality, Port Rame, in Chile. The Punctuated snake-eel's diet consists of fish and invertebrates. It is of commercial interest to Ecuadorian and Peruvian fisheries.

Due to its wide distribution, lack of known major threats, and lack of observed population decline, the IUCN redlist currently lists the Punctuated snake-eel as Least Concern.
