= Ophichthus brevicaudatus =

Scientific classification
- Kingdom: Animalia
- Phylum: Chordata
- Class: Actinopterygii
- Order: Anguilliformes
- Family: Ophichthidae
- Genus: Ophichthus
- Species: O. brevicaudatus

Binomial name
- Ophichthus brevicaudatus Y. T. Chu, H. L. Wu & X. B. Jin, 1981

Synonyms
- Ophichthys brevicaudatus Chu, Wu & Jin, 1981

Species of fish

Ophichthus brevicaudatus is an eel in the family Ophichthidae (worm/snake eels). It was described by Chu Yuan-Ting, Wu Han-Lin and Jin Xin-Bo in 1981. It is a marine, subtropical eel which is known from its type locality in the Taiwan Strait, in the northwestern Pacific Ocean.
