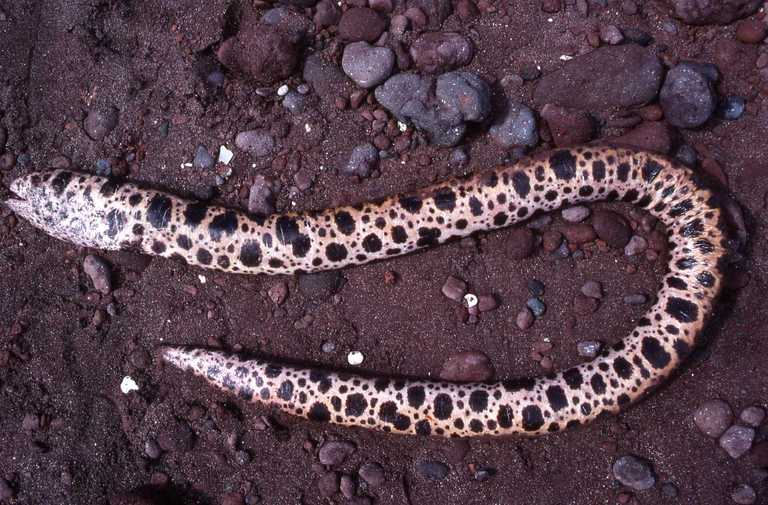

Conservation status
- Least Concern (IUCN 3.1)

Scientific classification
- Kingdom: Animalia
- Phylum: Chordata
- Class: Actinopterygii
- Order: Anguilliformes
- Family: Ophichthidae
- Genus: Ophichthus
- Species: O. triserialis

Binomial name
- Ophichthus triserialis (Kaup, 1856)

Synonyms
- Muraenopsis triserialis Kaup, 1856; Ophichthys triserialis (Kaup, 1857); Ophisurus californiensis Garrett, 1863; Ophichthys grandimaculata Kner & Steindachner, 1867

= Pacific snake eel =

Species of fish

The Pacific snake eel (Ophichthus triserialis, also known as the spotted snake eel in the United States) is an eel in the family Ophichthidae (worm/snake eels). It was described by Johann Jakob Kaup in 1856, originally under the genus Muraenopsis. It is a marine, subtropical eel which is known from the eastern central and southeastern Pacific Ocean, including California, US, Peru, the Gulf of California, Mexico, the Galapagos Islands, Colombia, Ecuador, Costa Rica, El Salvador, Honduras, Guatemala, Nicaragua, and Panama. It dwells at a maximum depth of 155 metres (509 ft), and forms burrows in mud and sand sediments. Males can reach a maximum total length of 115 centimetres (45 in), but more commonly reach a TL of 80 centimetres (31 in).

The species epithet "triserialis" means "three-rowed" in Latin, and refers to the eel's spotted pattern. The Pacific snake-eel's diet consists of bony fish, shrimp and bivalves. It is frequently captured as a by-catch by shrimp trawlers, but is usually discarded.

Due to its wide distribution, lack of known threats, and lack of observed population decline, the IUCN Red List lists the Pacific snake eel as Least Concern.
