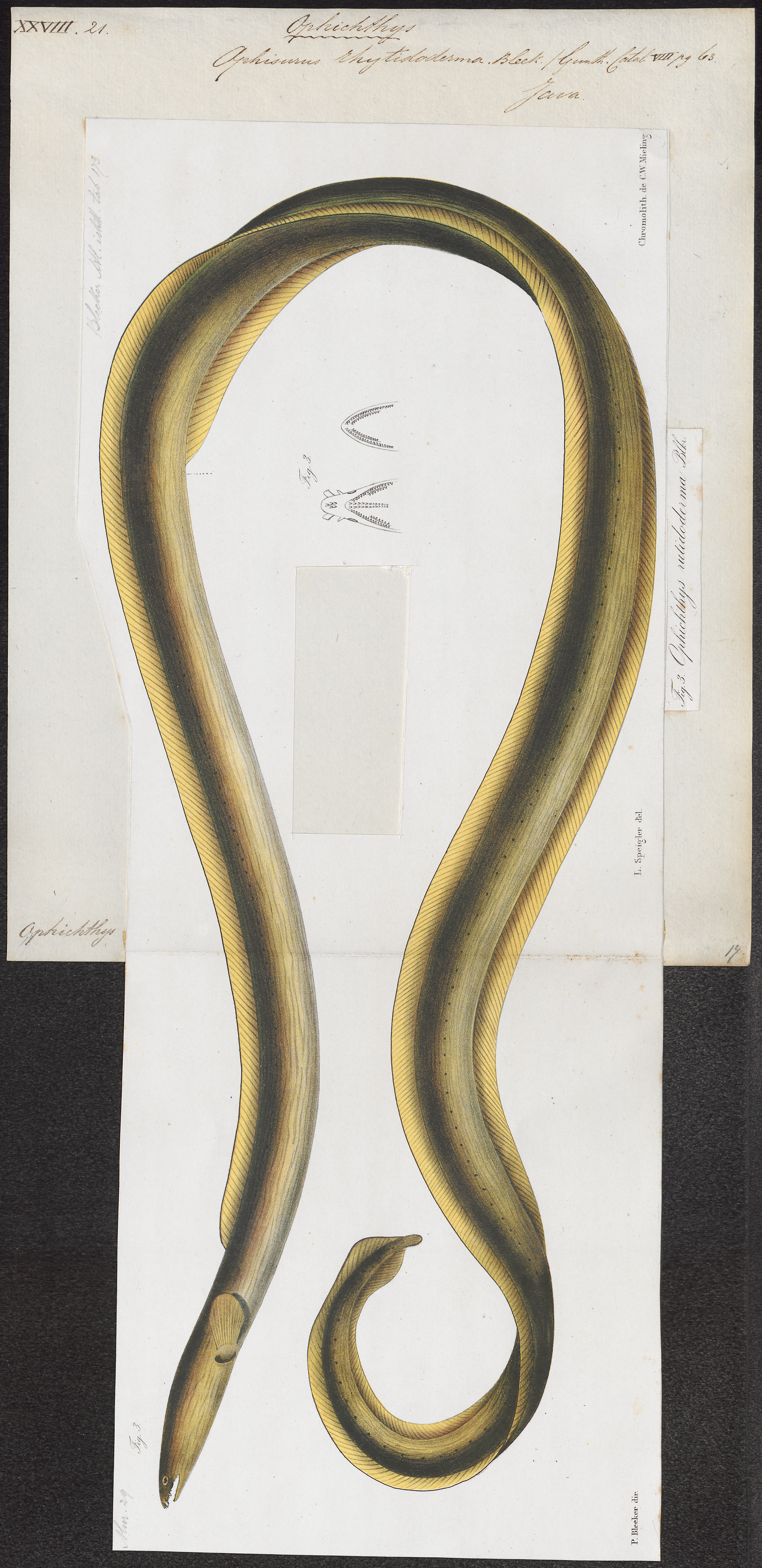

Scientific classification
- Domain: Eukaryota
- Kingdom: Animalia
- Phylum: Chordata
- Class: Actinopterygii
- Order: Anguilliformes
- Family: Ophichthidae
- Genus: Ophichthus
- Species: O. rutidoderma

Binomial name
- Ophichthus rutidoderma (Bleeker, 1853)

Synonyms
- Ophisurus rutidoderma Bleeker, 1853; Ophisurus lumbricoides Bleeker, 1853; Ophisurus rutidodermatoides Bleeker, 1853; Ophichthus rutidodermatoides (Bleeker, 1853); Ophichthys rutidodermatoides (Bleeker, 1853); Ophichthus derbyensis Whitley, 1941

= Olive snake eel =

Species of fish

The olive snake eel (Ophichthus rutidoderma, also known as the Derby snake-eel) is an eel in the family Ophichthidae (worm/snake eels). It was described by Pieter Bleeker in 1853, originally under the genus Ophisurus. It is a marine, tropical eel which is known from the Indo-Pacific. It forms burrows in soft sediments in shallow waters, and leads a nocturnal lifestyle. Males can reach a maximum total length of 95 centimetres (37 in).

The olive snake eel's diet consists of finfish.
