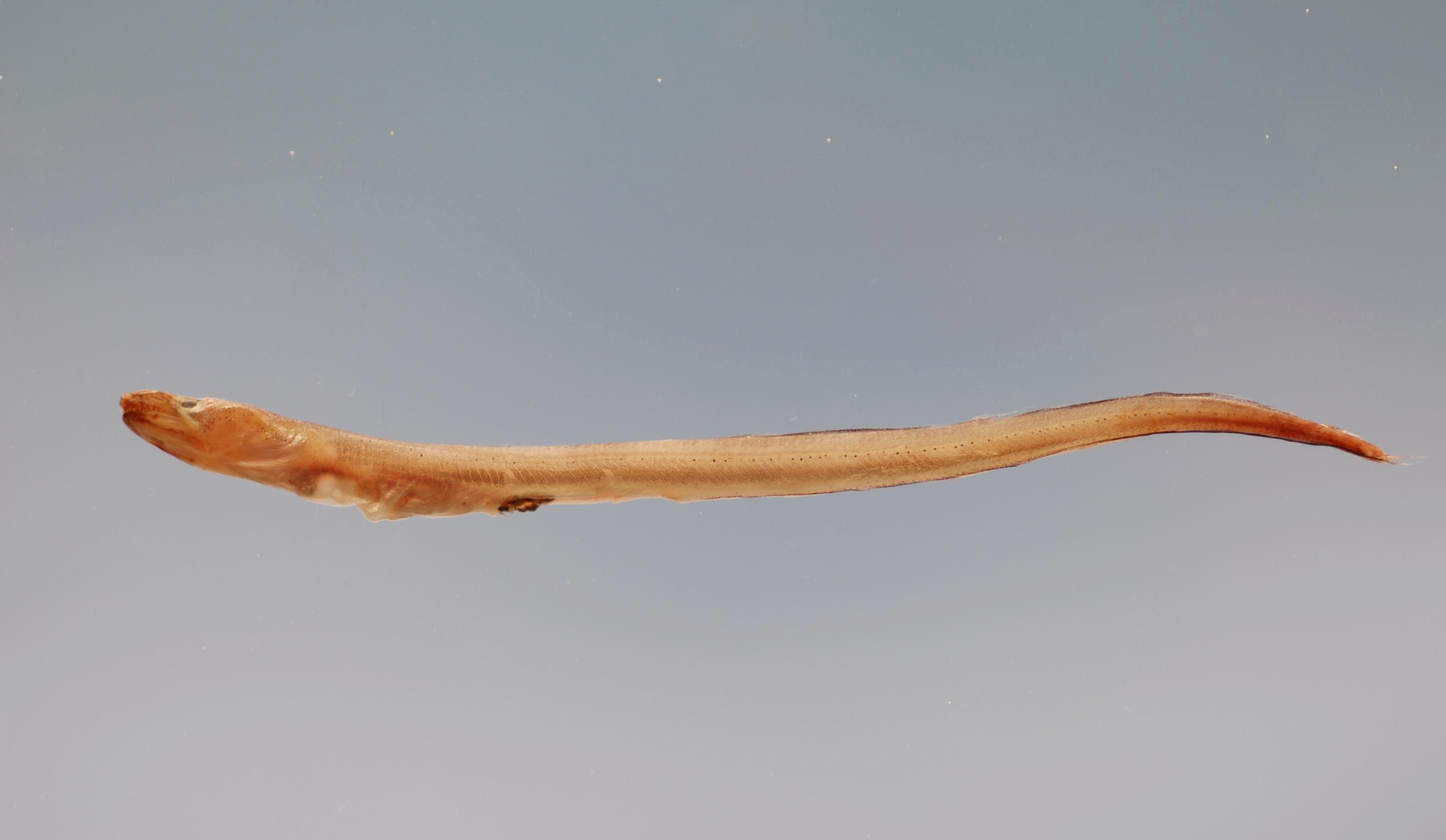

Scientific classification
- Domain: Eukaryota
- Kingdom: Animalia
- Phylum: Chordata
- Class: Actinopterygii
- Order: Anguilliformes
- Family: Ophichthidae
- Genus: Ophichthus
- Species: O. melanoporus

Binomial name
- Ophichthus melanoporus Kanazawa, 1963

= Blackpored eel =

Species of fish

The blackpored eel (Ophichthus melanoporus) is an eel in the family Ophichthidae (worm/snake eels). It was described by Robert H. Kanazawa in 1963. It is a tropical, marine eel which is known from the western central Atlantic Ocean, including Florida, USA; the Bahamas, and Mexico. It dwells at a depth range of 51–460 meters. While the adults inhabit deep water, the larvae are laid inshore. Males can reach a maximum total length of 70 centimeters.

Despite its considerable distribution, the IUCN redlist currently lists the blackpored eel as Data Deficient due to a lack of information on its population, habitat preferences, ecology, and potential threats.
