= Ethadophis epinepheli =

Scientific classification
- Domain: Eukaryota
- Kingdom: Animalia
- Phylum: Chordata
- Class: Actinopterygii
- Order: Anguilliformes
- Family: Ophichthidae
- Genus: Ethadophis
- Species: E. epinepheli

Binomial name
- Ethadophis epinepheli (Blache & Bauchot, 1972)

Synonyms
- Microrhynchus epinepheli Blache & Bauchot, 1972; Apterichtus epinepheli (Blache & Bauchot, 1972); Apterichtus epinephili (Blache & Bauchot, 1972)

Species of fish

Ethadophis epinepheli is an eel in the family Ophichthidae (worm/snake eels). It was described by Jacques Blache and Marie-Louise Bauchot in 1972. It is a tropical, marine eel which is known from a single specimen recovered from the stomach of a grouper in Senegal, in the eastern Atlantic Ocean. It is known to reach a total length of 42.4 centimetres.
