= Gymnothorax mccoskeri =

Conservation status
- Least Concern (IUCN 3.1)

Scientific classification
- Kingdom: Animalia
- Phylum: Chordata
- Class: Actinopterygii
- Order: Anguilliformes
- Family: Muraenidae
- Genus: Gymnothorax
- Species: G. mccoskeri

Binomial name
- Gymnothorax mccoskeri D. G. Smith & E. B. Böhlke, 1997

Species of fish

Gymnothorax mccoskeri is a moray eel found in the western Pacific and the eastern Indian Ocean. It was first named by Smith and Böhlke in 1997, and is commonly known as the McCosker's moray, many-banded moray-eel, or the manyband moray.
