= Ophichthus grandoculis =

Scientific classification
- Kingdom: Animalia
- Phylum: Chordata
- Class: Actinopterygii
- Order: Anguilliformes
- Family: Ophichthidae
- Genus: Ophichthus
- Species: O. grandoculis

Binomial name
- Ophichthus grandoculis (Cantor, 1849)

Synonyms
- Ophiurus grandoculis Cantor, 1849; Ophisurus grandoculis Cantor, 1849

Species of fish

Ophichthus grandoculis, known commonly as the snake-eel in Malaysia, is an eel in the family Ophichthidae (worm/snake eels). It was described by Theodore Edward Cantor in 1849, originally under the genus Ophisurus. It is a marine, tropical eel which is known from Malaysia, in the eastern Indian Ocean.
