= Ophichthus megalops =

Scientific classification
- Kingdom: Animalia
- Phylum: Chordata
- Class: Actinopterygii
- Order: Anguilliformes
- Family: Ophichthidae
- Genus: Ophichthus
- Species: O. megalops

Binomial name
- Ophichthus megalops Asano, 1987

Species of fish

Ophichthus megalops is an eel in the family Ophichthidae (worm/snake eels). It was described by Hirotoshi Asano in 1987. It is a marine, temperate water-dwelling eel which is known from Japan, in the northwestern Pacific Ocean. It is known to dwell at a depth of 360 meters (1,180 ft). Males can reach a maximum total length of 33.2 centimeters (13.1 in).
