= Ophichthus tsuchidae =

Scientific classification
- Domain: Eukaryota
- Kingdom: Animalia
- Phylum: Chordata
- Class: Actinopterygii
- Order: Anguilliformes
- Family: Ophichthidae
- Genus: Ophichthus
- Species: O. tsuchidae

Binomial name
- Ophichthus tsuchidae D. S. Jordan & Snyder, 1901

Species of fish

Ophichthus tsuchidae is an eel in the family Ophichthidae (worm/snake eels). It was described by David Starr Jordan and John Otterbein Snyder in 1901. It is a marine, subtropical eel which is known from Japan, in the northwestern Pacific Ocean. Males can reach a maximum total length of 50 centimeters (20 in).
