= Antillian snake eel =

Scientific classification
- Domain: Eukaryota
- Kingdom: Animalia
- Phylum: Chordata
- Class: Actinopterygii
- Order: Anguilliformes
- Family: Ophichthidae
- Genus: Ophichthus
- Species: O. spinicauda

Binomial name
- Ophichthus spinicauda (Norman, 1922)

Synonyms
- Acanthenchelys spinicauda Norman, 1922; Ophychthus spinicauda (Norman, 1922); Ophichthus zonatus Howell Rivero, 1932

Species of fish

The Antillian snake eel (Ophichthus spinicauda, also known commonly as the spinefin snake eel or the banded snake eel) is an eel in the family Ophichthidae (worm/snake eels). It was described by John Roxborough Norman in 1922. It is a marine, deep water-dwelling eel which is known from the western central Atlantic Ocean, including Cuba, Puerto Rico, Trinidad-Tobago, and Venezuela. It is known to dwell at a maximum depth of 300 meters, and inhabits coastal waters. Males can reach a maximum total length of 107 centimeters, but more commonly reach a TL of 70 cm.

The Antillian snake eel is of minor commercial interest to fisheries.
