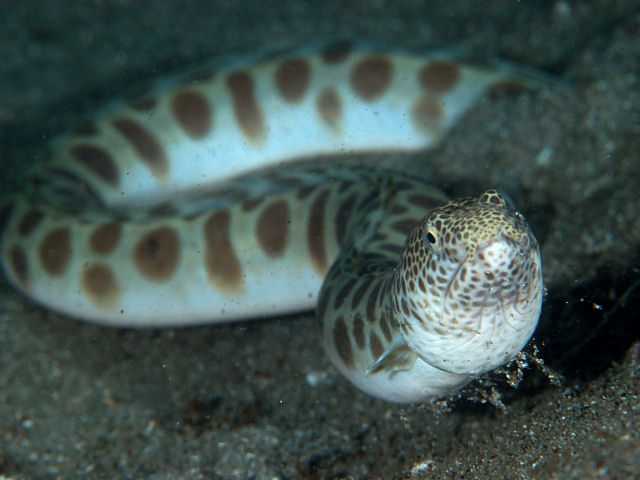

Scientific classification
- Kingdom: Animalia
- Phylum: Chordata
- Class: Actinopterygii
- Order: Anguilliformes
- Family: Ophichthidae
- Genus: Ophichthus
- Species: O. erabo

Binomial name
- Ophichthus erabo (D. S. Jordan & Snyder, 1901)

Synonyms
- Microdonophis erabo Jordan & Snyder, 1901; Ophichthus retifer Fowler, 1935

= Ophichthus erabo =

Species of fish

Ophichthus erabo, the blotched snake-eel, is a species of eel in the family Ophichthidae. It is a marine, subtropical eel which is known from the Indo-Pacific, including South Africa, Japan and Taiwan. It dwells at a maximum depth of 155 metres, inhabits reefs and leads a benthic life, forming burrows in sand. Males can reach a maximum total length of 72 centimetres.
