= Dusky snake eel =

Scientific classification
- Domain: Eukaryota
- Kingdom: Animalia
- Phylum: Chordata
- Class: Actinopterygii
- Order: Anguilliformes
- Family: Ophichthidae
- Genus: Ophichthus
- Species: O. cylindroideus

Binomial name
- Ophichthus cylindroideus (Ranzani, 1839)

Synonyms
- Conger cylindroideus Ranzani, 1839; Ophichthus cylindroides (Ranzani, 1839)

Species of fish

The dusky snake eel (Ophichthus cylindroideus, also known as the tentacle-nose eel) is an eel in the family Ophichthidae (worm/snake eels). It was described by Camillo Ranzani in 1839. It is a tropical, marine eel which is known from the western Atlantic Ocean, including Cuba and Brazil.
