= Plain snake eel =

Scientific classification
- Domain: Eukaryota
- Kingdom: Animalia
- Phylum: Chordata
- Class: Actinopterygii
- Order: Anguilliformes
- Family: Ophichthidae
- Genus: Ophichthus
- Species: O. unicolor

Binomial name
- Ophichthus unicolor Regan, 1908

Synonyms
- Ophichthys unicolor Regan, 1908; Ophichthys triserialis Barnard, 1923; Ophichthys algoensis Barnard, 1925

Species of fish

The plain snake eel (Ophichthus unicolor) is an eel in the family Ophichthidae (worm/snake eels). It was described by Charles Tate Regan in 1908. It is a marine, subtropical eel which is known from Algoa Bay, South Africa, in the southeastern Atlantic Ocean. Males can reach a maximum total length of 30 centimetres (12 in).
