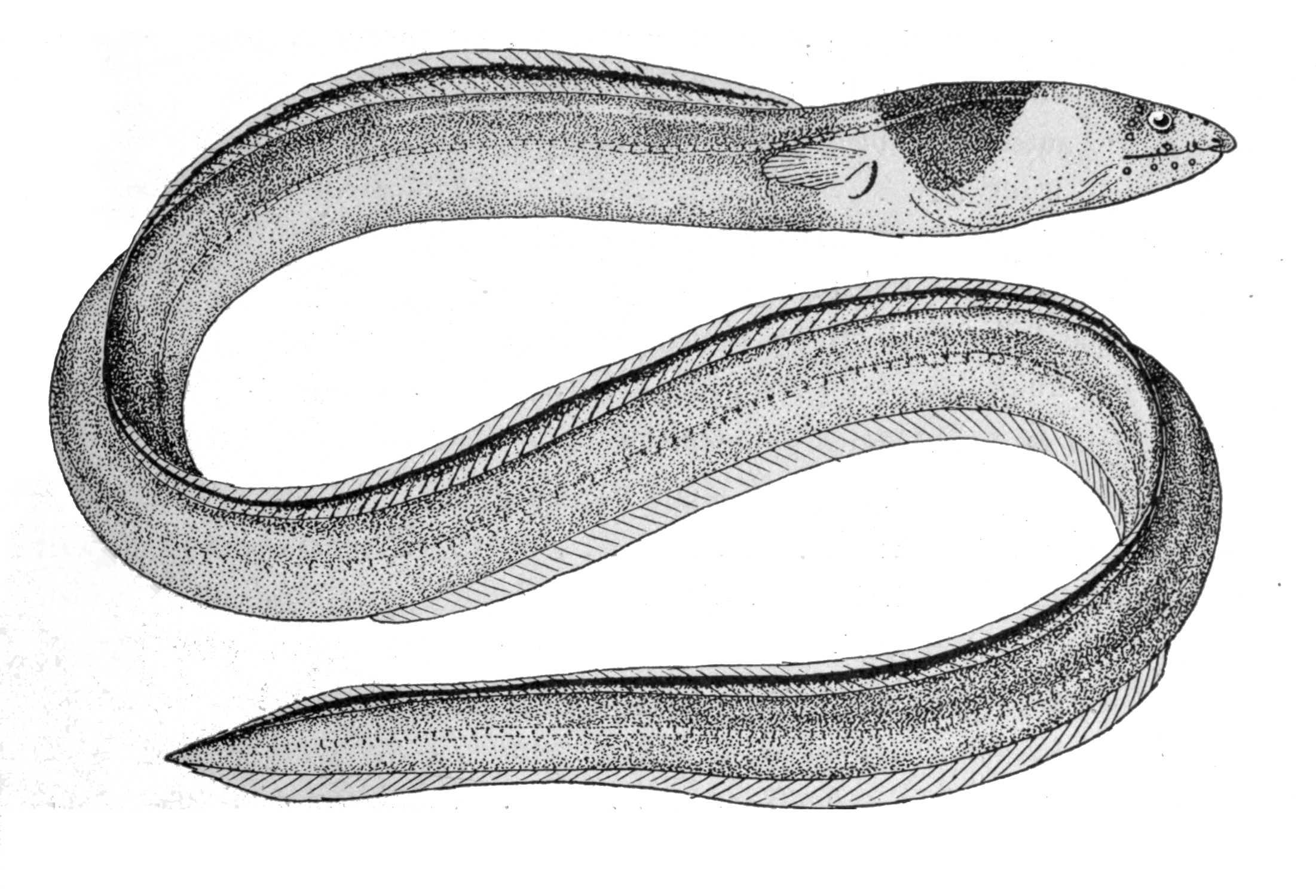

Scientific classification
- Domain: Eukaryota
- Kingdom: Animalia
- Phylum: Chordata
- Class: Actinopterygii
- Order: Anguilliformes
- Family: Ophichthidae
- Genus: Ophichthus
- Species: O. cephalozona

Binomial name
- Ophichthus cephalozona Bleeker, 1864

Synonyms
- Ophichthys cephalozona Bleeker, 1864

= Dark-shouldered snake eel =

Species of fish

The dark-shouldered snake eel (Ophichthus cephalozona, also known commonly as the headsaddle snake eel, the black-neck snake eel, the blacksaddle snake eel, or the one-banded snake-eel) is an eel in the family Ophichthidae (worm/snake eels). It was described by Pieter Bleeker in 1864. It is a tropical, marine eel which is known from the Pacific Ocean, including the East Indies, the Society Islands, the Mariana Islands, Queensland, the Marshall Islands, Micronesia, Japan, and India. It dwells at a depth range of 2–15 metres, and inhabits reefs. It forms burrows in mud and sand, and forages during the night. Males can reach a maximum total length of 115 centimetres.

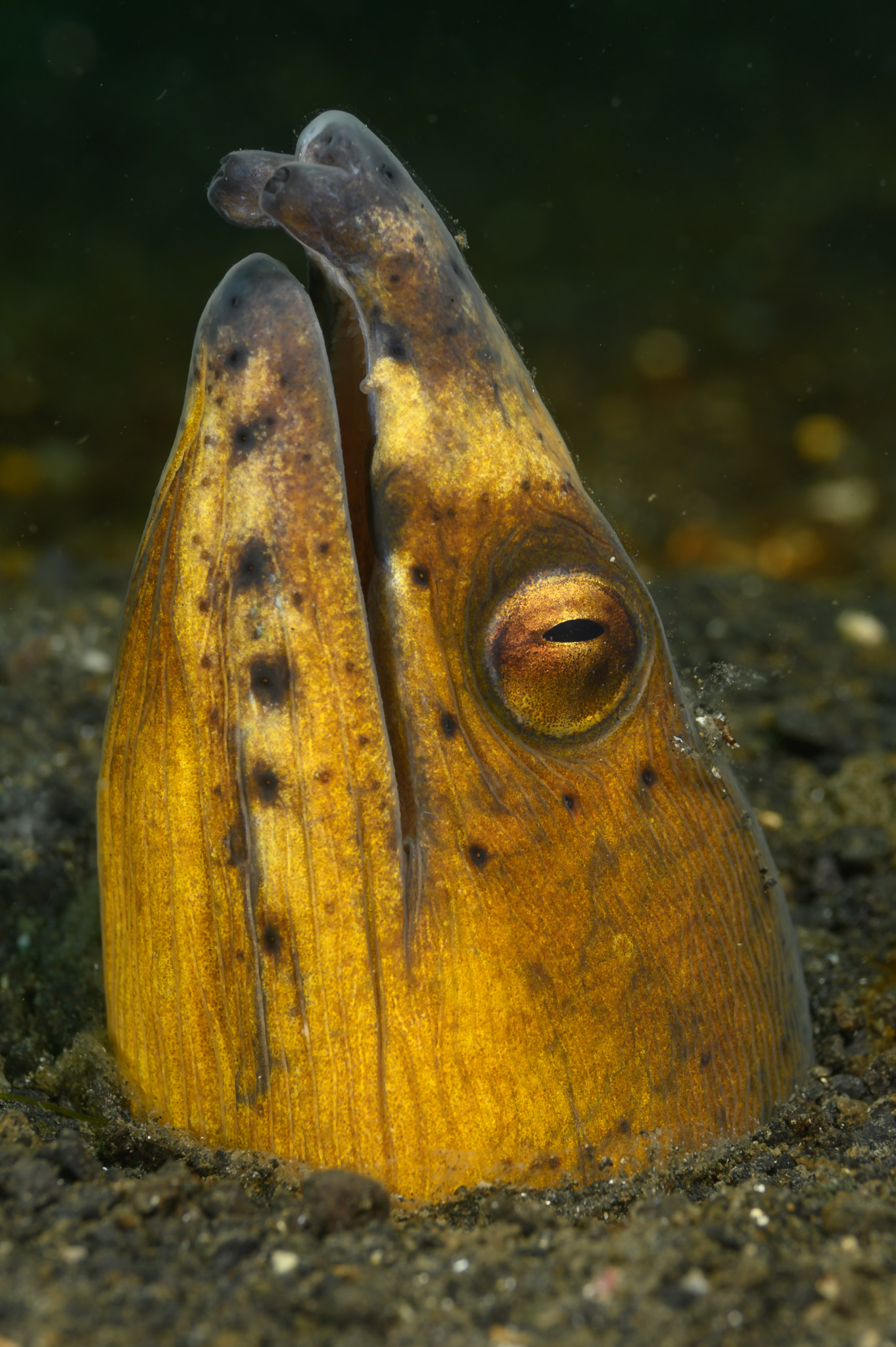
Dark-shouldered snake eel at Lembeh Strait, Indonesia

The dark-shouldered snake eel is of no commercial interest to fisheries, but is sometimes caught in nets in the Ryukyu Islands.
