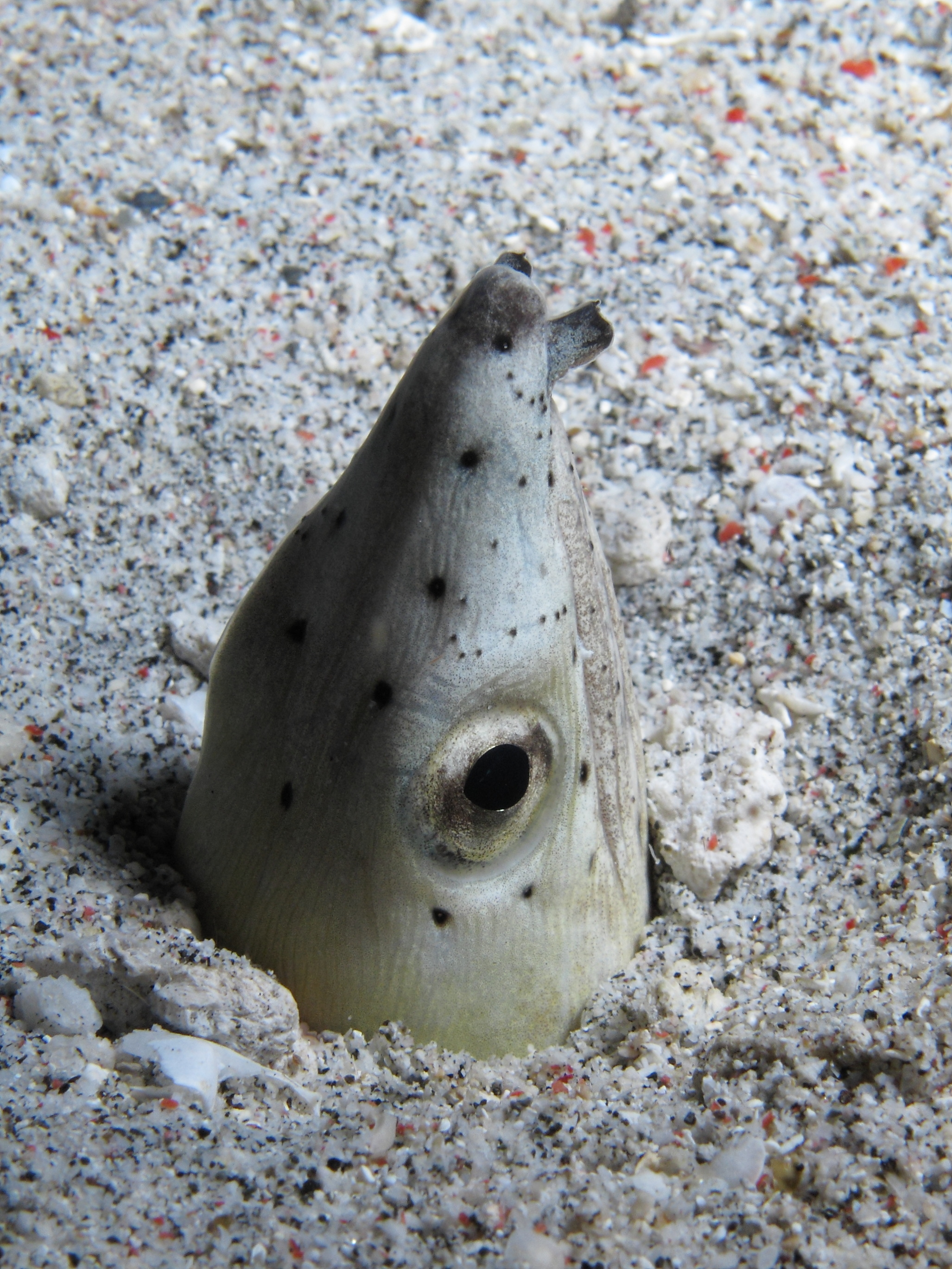
- O. altipennis burrowed in the sand (Komodo, Indonesia)

Conservation status
- Least Concern (IUCN 3.1)

Scientific classification
- Domain: Eukaryota
- Kingdom: Animalia
- Phylum: Chordata
- Class: Actinopterygii
- Order: Anguilliformes
- Family: Ophichthidae
- Genus: Ophichthus
- Species: O. altipennis

Binomial name
- Ophichthus altipennis (Kaup, 1856)

Synonyms
- Microdonophis altipennis Kaup, 1856; Ophichthus altipinnis (Kaup, 1856); Ophichthys melanochir Bleeker, 1864; Ophichthus melanochir (Bleeker, 1864); Pisoodonophis zophistius Jordan & Snyder, 1901; Pisodonophis zophistius Jordan & Snyder, 1901

= Highfin snake eel =

Species of fish

The highfin snake eel (Ophichthus altipennis, also known as the blackfin snake eel or the black-finned snake eel, is an eel in the family Ophichthidae. It was described by Johann Jakob Kaup in 1856, originally under the genus Microdonophis. It is a marine, tropical eel known from the eastern Indian Ocean and northwestern and western central Pacific Ocean, including Australia, French Polynesia, Indonesia, Japan, the Marshall Islands, Malaysia, the Philippines, and Papua New Guinea. It dwells at a depth range of 0 to 40 m (0 to 131 ft), and forms burrows in soft inshore sand sediments. Males can reach a maximum total length of 103 cm (41 in).

Due to its wide distribution in the Pacific and lack of known threats, the IUCN redlist currently lists the highfin snake eel as "Least Concern".
