= Galapagos: Beyond Darwin =

- Genre: Television Documentary
- Written by: Steve Zousmer
- Directed by: Al Giddings
- Narrated by: Roscoe Lee Browne
- Composer: Chris Andromidas
- Country of origin: United States
- Original language: English

Production
- Producers: David Clark; Al Giddings; Mick Kaczorowski
- Cinematography: Al Giddings; Robert Hanna
- Editor: Martha Conboy

Original release
- Network: Discovery Channel
- Release: August 16, 1996

Galapagos: Beyond Darwin is a 1996 documentary narrated by actor Roscoe Lee Browne. It premiered on the Discovery Channel on Sunday, August 18, 1996. It was directed by Al Giddings.

== Synopsis ==
Actor Roscoe Lee Browne narrates this Discovery Channel program that takes viewers 3,000 feet below the surface of the ocean near the Galapagos Islands. Located off the Ecuadorian coast of South America, this area was first visited by British biologist Charles Darwin in 1835. His discovery of many new species and organisms thriving on the islands brought this area international acclaim. Unfortunately, since sophisticated submersibles didn't exist in Darwin's day, he was prevented from journeying far beneath the surrounding waters. As this program indicates, today's submersibles allow scientists to spend extended time periods beneath the ocean's surface. The deep ocean journey featured during this program turned up dozens of new species. In fact, the scientists even captured some of the creatures so they could more fully study and classify them.
