= Eugenia Brandt Böhlke =

American ichthyologist (1928–2001)

- Born: June 27, 1928; Black Diamond, Washington, U.S.
- Died: February 14, 2001 (aged 72)
- Education: Stanford University
- Known for: Work on moray eels
- Spouse: James Erwin Böhlke (m. 1951)
- Children: 3
- Scientific career
- Fields: Ichthyology
- Workplaces: SRI International; Academy of Natural Sciences, Philadelphia

Eugenia (Genie) Brandt Böhlke (née Brandt; June 27, 1928 – February 14, 2001) was an American ichthyologist who published over thirty-five academic papers about moray eels. She was also an active collaborator with her husband James Erwin Böhlke, an ichthyologist who specialized in neotropical fishes. Both were associated with the Academy of Natural Sciences, Philadelphia, and Genie Böhlke contributed research to the institution until her death in 2001.

== Early life and education ==
Eugenia Louisa Brandt was born in Black Diamond, Washington on 27 June 1928 to Arnold Louis Brandt and Gertrude Scholten Brandt. She attended West Seattle High School and graduated with a math major in 1945. She attended Valparaiso University on scholarship for two years, then transferred to Stanford University in her junior year. Böhlke graduated from Stanford with a B.S. in Biological Sciences in 1949 and stayed on to complete an M.S. in chemistry in 1951. It was at Stanford that she met her future ichthyological partner, and husband, Jim Böhlke. They were married in 1951 and had three children: John Karl (J.K.), Mark, and Cathy.

== Career ==
In 1951, Böhlke took a position with the Stanford Research Institute, providing financial support for the household while her husband Jim finished his graduate work. After Jim took a position in 1954 at the Academy of Natural Sciences, Philadelphia to produce a handbook on the fishes of the Bahamas, Genie split her time between caring for their young children, and providing cataloging, fieldwork, and editorial support for Jim. As her children grew, she had more time to focus on establishing her career. In her obituary, published in the journal Copeia by the American Society of Ichthyologists and Herpetologists, David G. Smith writes, "Her job titles changed over the years from Cataloguer to Technician-Chemist to Research Biologist to Museum Specialist to Research Associate, reflecting the increasing depth and impact of her work."

Over time, Böhlke developed an interest in Muraenidae (moray eels) and devoted the majority of her work to them. Of her proclivity for eel research, colleague John E. McCosker noted following her death, "Genie was organized and assiduous, and developed a keen eye for species differences—a difficult task within families of fishes bereft of scales and often without coloration or other useful characters."

== Death and legacy ==
Böhlke died of cancer in 2001 after an initial diagnosis in 1996. Her final publication, an article on Gymnothorax eurygnathos, a new species of eel in the Gulf of California, was published posthumously in Volume 49, No. S1 of the International Journal of Tropical Biology and Conservation (Revista de Biología Tropical). The volume is dedicated to Böhlke and features a statement from her "fellow anguillophile" John E. McCosker. He notes her "recent death left ichthyologists at a loss for her absence but much the wiser from her life's contributions."

The Böhlke Fund, an endowment supporting ichthyological researchers at the Academy of Natural Sciences, Philadelphia, now a part of Drexel University, was established in the memory of Genie and Jim Böhlke.
