= Richard Heinrich Rosenblatt =

Richard Heinrich Rosenblatt (December 21, 1930 – October 14, 2014) was an American ichthyologist. Rosenblatt was born in Kansas City, Missouri, in 1930 and died in San Diego, California, in 2014. Rosenblatt was awarded the Frederick H. Stoye Award for undergraduate students in ichthyology by the American Society of Ichthyologists and Herpetologists in 1956 and 1957. Rosenblatt earned three degrees from the University of California, Los Angeles, receiving his BA in 1953, his MA in 1954, and his PhD in 1959. Rosenblatt proposed in his unpublished dissertation what is now the genus name for the Largemouth triplefin, Ucla, after the initials of the University of California, Los Angeles (UCLA).

== See also ==
- Category:Taxa named by Richard Heinrich Rosenblatt
