= John E. McCosker =

American oceanographer

- Education: Scripps Institution of Oceanography (PhD); Occidental College (BA)
- Occupation: Senior Scientist
- Years active: 1967–present

John Edward McCosker is an American ichthyologist and as has been part of expeditions to many countries such as Antarctica, Australia, and the Galapagos. After extensive study and ten expeditions he is one of the foremost experts on the Galapagos. He has been featured in various different television documentaries as well as working with filmmakers and other documentary programs off screen.

McCosker earned his BA degree from the Occidental College (Los Angeles) in 1967. He attended the Scripps Institution of Oceanography in 1973 where McCosker gained his PhD degree. Currently he is a senior scientist at the California Academy of Sciences based in San Francisco. He joined the academy in 1973 as superintendent within the Steinhart Aquarium. Between 1976 and 1994 he was the director. From 1988 to 1989, and again in 1995, he was the Interim Executive Director for the Academy.

The generic name of the blenny Mccoskerichthys sandae honours McCosker, because he discovered it and assisted in the collection of the type while its specific name honours his then wife, Sandra.

== Filmography ==
Year	Title	Role	Notes
1984	Jaws: The True Story	Self	TV Documentary
1987	Jaws: The Revenge	N/A	Thanks / Miscellaneous Crew
1996	Galapagos: Beyond Darwin	Self	TV movie documentary
1996	The World's Most Dangerous Animals	Self	TV movie documentary
1999	Galapagos: The Enchanted Voyage	Self	Documentary short
1999	Island of the Sharks	Advisor	Documentary short
2003	MythBusters	Self	
2005	Naked Science	Himself	
2005	In the Wake of the Zaca	Special Thanks	Video documentary

Dr. McCosker also appeared on The Tonight Show, starring Johnny Carson on July 12, 1984. Other guests on the episode were Miss Piggy and Howie Mandel.

== Taxon described by him ==
- See Category:Taxa named by John E. McCosker

== Taxon named in his honor ==
- The McCosker's worm eel, Neenchelys mccoskeri Y. Hibino, H. C. Ho & Seishi Kimura, 2012 is an eel in the family Ophichthidae (worm/snake eels).
- Gymnothorax mccoskeri D. G. Smith & E. B. Böhlke, 1997 is a moray eel that lives around northern Australia.
