= Pseudomyrophis frio =

Scientific classification
- Kingdom: Animalia
- Phylum: Chordata
- Class: Actinopterygii
- Order: Anguilliformes
- Family: Ophichthidae
- Genus: Pseudomyrophis
- Species: P. frio

Binomial name
- Pseudomyrophis frio (Jordan & Davis, 1891)

Synonyms
- Myrophis frio Jordan & Davis, 1891

Species of fish

Pseudomyrophis frio is an eel in the family Ophichthidae (worm/snake eels). It was described by David Starr Jordan and Bradley Moore Davis in 1891, originally under the genus Myrophis. It is a marine, tropical eel which is known from the southwestern Atlantic Ocean. It is known to dwell at a depth of 108 metres (354 ft). Males can reach a maximum NG of 26 centimetres (10 in).
