= Pylorobranchus hearstorum =

Conservation status
- Data Deficient (IUCN 3.1)

Scientific classification
- Kingdom: Animalia
- Phylum: Chordata
- Class: Actinopterygii
- Order: Anguilliformes
- Family: Ophichthidae
- Genus: Pylorobranchus
- Species: P. hearstorum

Binomial name
- Pylorobranchus hearstorum McCosker, 2014

Species of fish

Pylorobranchus hearstorum, the gigantic worm eel, is a species of marine ray-finned fish belonging to the subfamily Myrophinae, the worm eels, in the family Ophichthidae, which also includes the snake eels. This species is known from a single specimen, the holotype collected from the Verde Island Passage in the Philippines at 13.583-13.575°N, 120.382-120.411°E from a depth between 892 and 966 m (2,927 and 3,169 ft). The species was described in 2014 by the American marine biologist John E. McCosker. The specific name honours the friends of McCosker and philanthropists William and Margaret Hearst, who sponsored the expedition the holotype was collected on. This single known specimen of this species had a total length of 121.8 cm (48.0 in).
