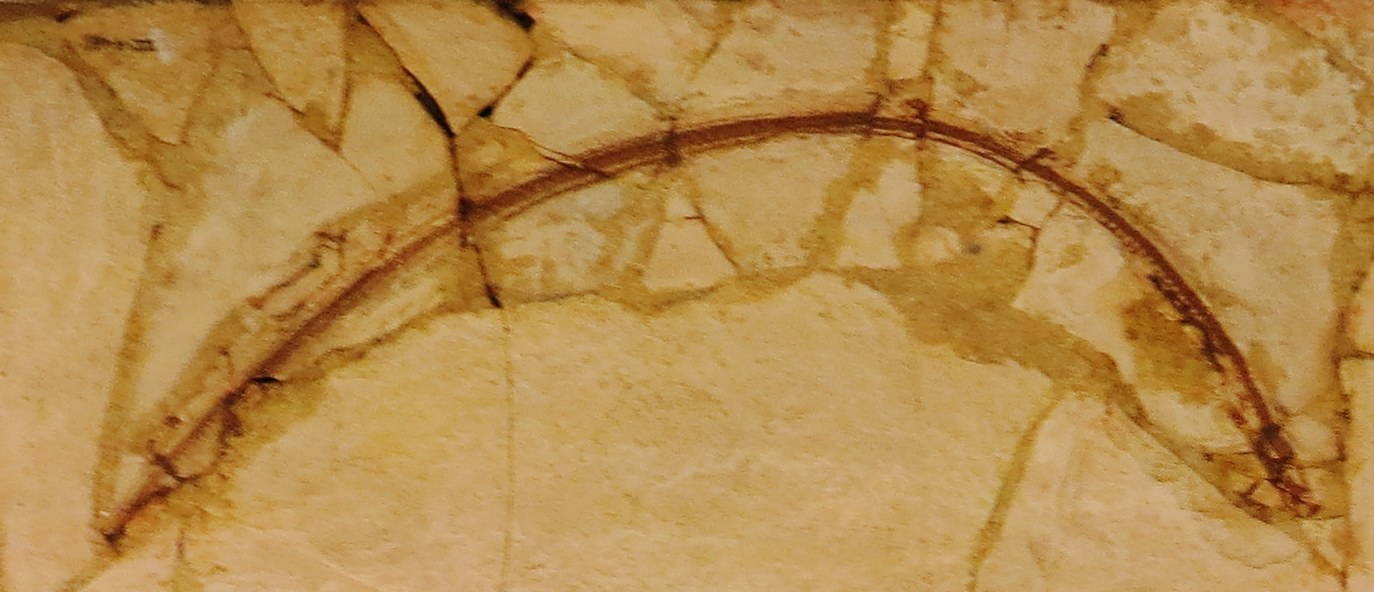
- Fossil - at Museo di storia naturale di Verona

Scientific classification
- Kingdom: Animalia
- Phylum: Chordata
- Class: Actinopterygii
- Order: Anguilliformes
- Family: Ophichthidae
- Genus: †Goslinophis; Blot, 1981
- Species: †G. acuticaudus

Binomial name
- †Goslinophis acuticaudus (de Zigno, 1874 ex Agassiz, 1835)

= Goslinophis =

Goslinophis Temporal range: Early Eocene

Extinct genus of fishes

Goslinophis is an extinct genus of marine snake eel known the Eocene of Europe. It contains a single species, G. acuticaudus from the Early Eocene-aged Monte Bolca site of Italy. It shares some similarities with the closely-related modern genus Echelus, and may potentially be synonymous with it.

The species was first figured in 1796 by Giovanni Serafino Volta, who identified it as a fossil specimen of "Muraena ophis", the modern spotted snake eel. In 1835, Louis Agassiz identified it as a distinct species, naming it Ophisurus acuticaudus, but without a proper description, leaving it a nomen nudum. The species was officially described by de Zigno in 1874, using Agassiz's name. In 1981, Blot moved the species to its own genus, Goslinophis.

== See also ==
- Prehistoric fish
- List of prehistoric bony fish
