= Gordiichthys combibus =

Conservation status
- Data Deficient (IUCN 3.1)

Scientific classification
- Kingdom: Animalia
- Phylum: Chordata
- Class: Actinopterygii
- Order: Anguilliformes
- Family: Ophichthidae
- Genus: Gordiichthys
- Species: G. combibus

Binomial name
- Gordiichthys combibus McCosker & Lavenberg, 2001

Species of fish

Gordiichthys combibus is an eel in the family Ophichthidae (worm/snake eels). It was described by John E. McCosker and Robert J. Lavenberg in 2001. It is a marine, tropical eel which is known from Colombia, in the eastern central Pacific Ocean. It is known to dwell at a depth range of 0 to 2 metres (0.0 to 6.6 ft), and inhabit shallow water. Males can reach a maximum total length of 40.6 centimetres (16.0 in).

The species epithet "combibo" means "to drink with a companion" in Latin, and refers to the sibling nature of G. combibus to G. randalli. The IUCN redlist currently lists G. combibus as Data Deficient, as it is known from only a few specimens collected in Colombia.
