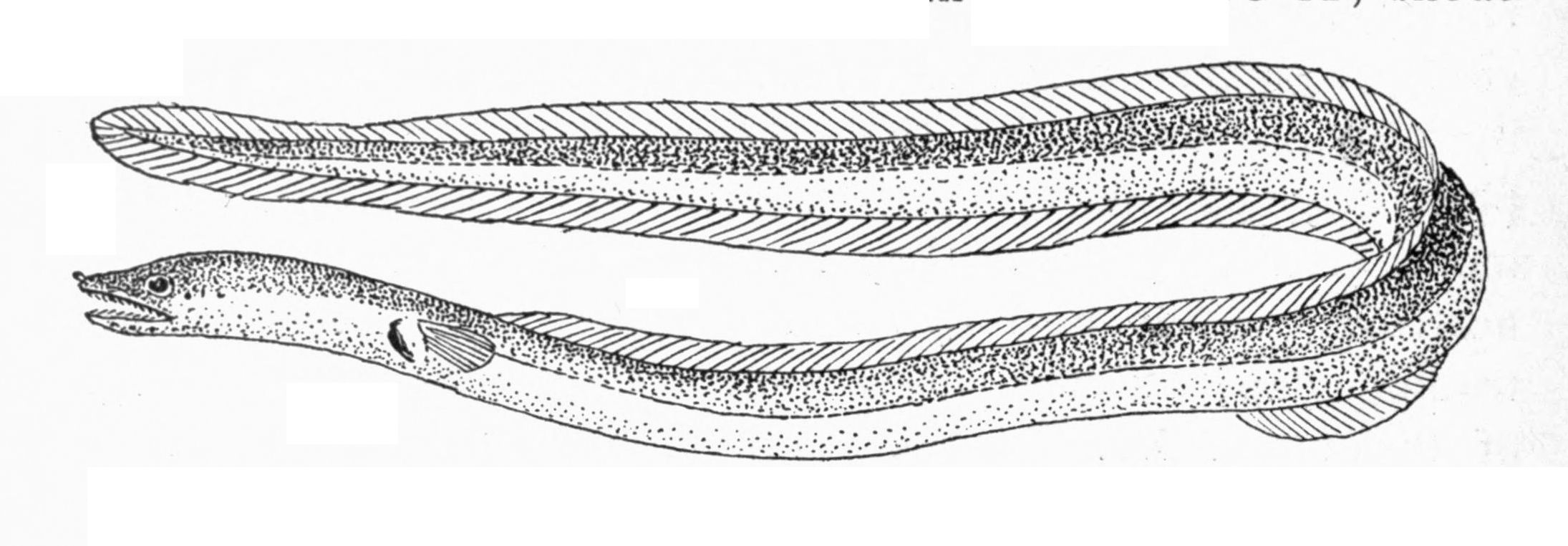

Scientific classification
- Kingdom: Animalia
- Phylum: Chordata
- Class: Actinopterygii
- Order: Anguilliformes
- Family: Ophichthidae
- Genus: Myrophis
- Species: M. microchir

Binomial name
- Myrophis microchir (Bleeker, 1864)

Synonyms
- Echelus microchir Bleeker, 1864

= Ordinary snake eel =

Species of fish

The ordinary snake eel (Myrophis microchir) is an eel in the family Ophichthidae (worm/snake eels). It was described by Pieter Bleeker in 1864, originally under the genus Echelus. It is a marine, tropical eel which is known from the Indo-Western Pacific, including Vietnam, Japan, Fiji, the Marshall Islands, and Australia. It inhabits sandy sediments. Males can reach a maximum total length of 39 centimetres (1 ft 3 in).
