= Benthenchelys pacificus =

Conservation status
- Data Deficient (IUCN 3.1)

Scientific classification
- Kingdom: Animalia
- Phylum: Chordata
- Class: Actinopterygii
- Division: Teleostei
- Order: Anguilliformes
- Family: Ophichthidae
- Genus: Benthenchelys
- Species: B. pacificus

Binomial name
- Benthenchelys pacificus Castle, 1972

Synonyms
- Benthenchelys cartieri pacificus Castle, 1972

Species of fish

Benthenchelys pacificus is an eel in the family Ophichthidae, described by Peter Henry John Castle in 1972, originally as a subspecies of Benthenchelys cartieri. It is a marine, deep-water-dwelling eel known only from its type locality in the eastern central Pacific Ocean. It inhabits the pelagic zone.
