= Horsehair eel =

Conservation status
- Least Concern (IUCN 3.1)

Scientific classification
- Kingdom: Animalia
- Phylum: Chordata
- Class: Actinopterygii
- Order: Anguilliformes
- Family: Ophichthidae
- Genus: Gordiichthys
- Species: G. irretitus

Binomial name
- Gordiichthys irretitus D. S. Jordan & B. M. Davis, 1891

Species of fish

The Horsehair eel (Gordiichthys irretitus) is an eel in the family Ophichthidae (worm/snake eels). It was described by David Starr Jordan and Bradley Moore Davis in 1891. It is a marine, tropical eel which is known from the western central Atlantic Ocean, including Florida, USA, the Gulf of Mexico and Puerto Rico. It dwells at a depth range of 90 to 200 meters (300 to 660 ft), and inhabits sand and mud substrates. Males can reach a maximum total length of 76 centimeters (30 in).
