= Neenchelys cheni =

Scientific classification
- Domain: Eukaryota
- Kingdom: Animalia
- Phylum: Chordata
- Class: Actinopterygii
- Order: Anguilliformes
- Family: Ophichthidae
- Genus: Neenchelys
- Species: N. cheni

Binomial name
- Neenchelys cheni (J. S. T. F. Chen & T. C. Weng, 1967)

Synonyms
- Myrophis cheni Chen & Weng, 1967; Neenchelys retropinna Smith & Böhlke, 1983

Species of fish

Neenchelys cheni is an eel in the family Ophichthidae (worm/snake eels). It was described by Johnson T. F. Chen and Herman Ting-Chen Weng in 1967, originally under the genus Myrophis. It is a marine, temperate water-dwelling eel which is known from Taiwan, in the northwestern Pacific Ocean. Males can reach a maximum standard length of 35 centimetres (14 in).

The species epithet "cheni" refers to Tung-Pai Chen.
