= Benthenchelys indicus =

Conservation status
- Least Concern (IUCN 3.1)

Scientific classification
- Kingdom: Animalia
- Phylum: Chordata
- Class: Actinopterygii
- Order: Anguilliformes
- Family: Ophichthidae
- Genus: Benthenchelys
- Species: B. indicus

Binomial name
- Benthenchelys indicus Castle, 1972

Synonyms
- Benthenchelys cartieri indicus Castle, 1972

Species of fish

Benthenchelys indicus is an eel in the family Ophichthidae, described by Peter Henry John Castle in 1972, originally as a subspecies of Benthenchelys cartieri. It is a marine, deep-water-dwelling eel known only from its type locality in the eastern Indian Ocean. It inhabits the pelagic zone.
