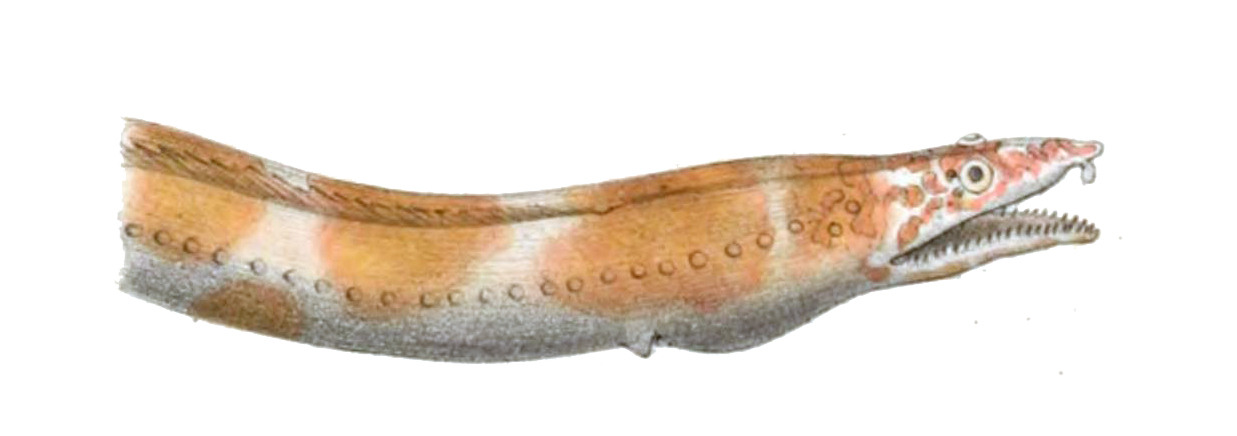
- Quassiremus ascensionis

Scientific classification
- Kingdom: Animalia
- Phylum: Chordata
- Class: Actinopterygii
- Order: Anguilliformes
- Family: Ophichthidae
- Subfamily: Ophichthinae
- Genus: Quassiremus; D. S. Jordan & B. M. Davis, 1891

Type species
- Ophichthus evionthas D. S. Jordan & Bollman 1890

Species
- See text

= Quassiremus =

Genus of fishes

Quassiremus is a genus of eels in the snake eel family Ophichthidae. It currently contains the following species:

- Quassiremus ascensionis (Studer, 1889) (Black-spotted snake eel)
- Quassiremus evionthas (D. S. Jordan & Bollman, 1890) (Galapagos snake eel)
- Quassiremus nothochir (C. H. Gilbert, 1890) (Smallfish snake eel)
- Quassiremus polyclitellum Castle, 1996
