= Ornate snake eel =

Conservation status
- Data Deficient (IUCN 3.1)

Scientific classification
- Kingdom: Animalia
- Phylum: Chordata
- Class: Actinopterygii
- Order: Anguilliformes
- Family: Ophichthidae
- Genus: Herpetoichthys
- Species: H. regius

Binomial name
- Herpetoichthys regius (Richardson, 1848)

Synonyms
- Ophisurus regius Richardson, 1848; Ophichthus regius (Richardson, 1848); Ophichthys regius (Richardson, 1848); Herpetoichthys ornatissimus Kaup, 1856; Ophichthus ornatissimus (Kaup, 1856)

Species of fish

The ornate snake eel (Herpetoichthys regius), also known as the sea snake in St. Helena is an eel in the family Ophichthidae (worm/snake eels). It was described by John Richardson in 1848, originally under the genus Ophisurus. It is a marine, tropical eel which is known from the eastern Atlantic Ocean, including Mauritania, St. Helena, and Ascension Island. It inhabits the continental shelf, where it forms burrows in sand sediments. Males can reach a maximum total length of 90 centimetres (35 in).
