= Echelidae =

Echelidae or Echelidai (Ἐχελίδαι) was a deme of ancient Attica. It was so called from the hero Echelus, and lay between Peiraeeus and the Heracleium, in or near a marshy district, and possessed a Hippodrome, in which horse-races took place. It is probable that this Hippodrome is the place to which the narrative in Demosthenes refers, in which case it was near the city.

Its site is unlocated.
