= String eel =

Conservation status
- Least Concern (IUCN 3.1)

Scientific classification
- Kingdom: Animalia
- Phylum: Chordata
- Class: Actinopterygii
- Order: Anguilliformes
- Family: Ophichthidae
- Genus: Gordiichthys
- Species: G. leibyi

Binomial name
- Gordiichthys leibyi McCosker & Böhlke, 1984

Species of fish

The String eel (Gordiichthys leibyi) is a species of eels in the family Ophichthidae (worm/snake eels). It was described by John E. McCosker and James Erwin Böhlke in 1984. It is a marine, temperate water-dwelling eel which is known from the western central and northwestern Atlantic Ocean, including Florida, USA; Puerto Rico, and Canada. It dwells at a depth range of 37 to 72 meters (121 to 236 ft), and inhabits mud and sand sediments.
