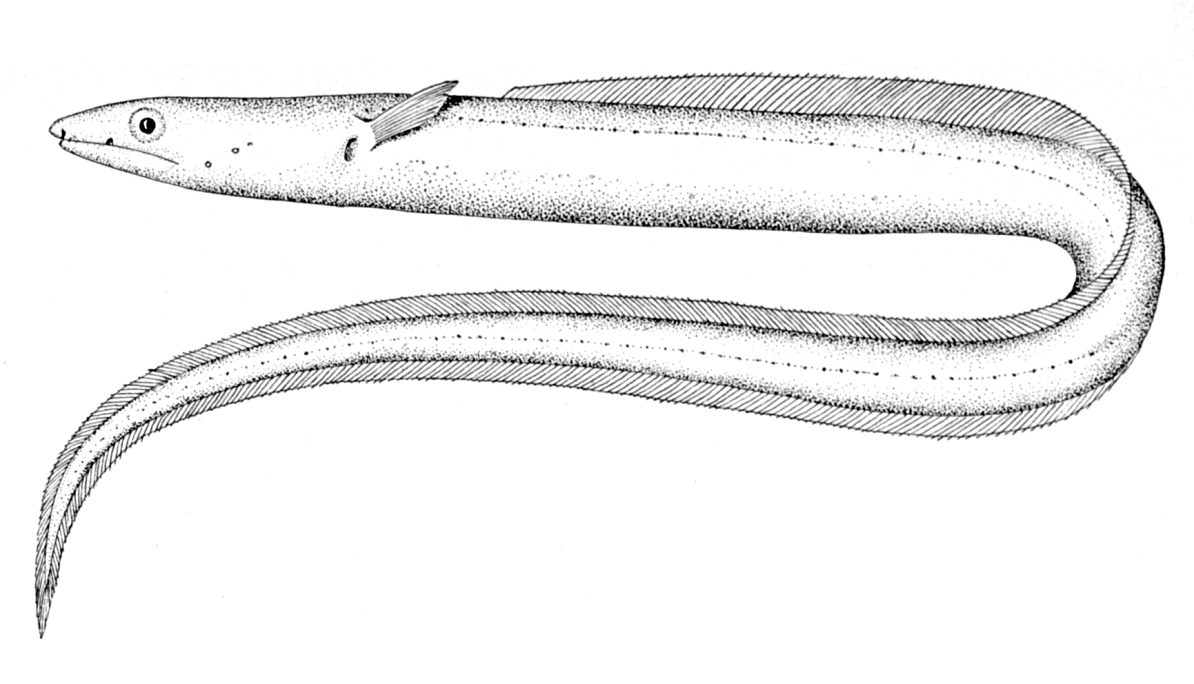

Conservation status
- Least Concern (IUCN 3.1)

Scientific classification
- Kingdom: Animalia
- Phylum: Chordata
- Class: Actinopterygii
- Order: Anguilliformes
- Family: Ophichthidae
- Genus: Echelus
- Species: E. pachyrhynchus

Binomial name
- Echelus pachyrhynchus (Vaillant, 1888)

Synonyms
- Myrus pachyrhynchus Vaillant, 1888

= Echelus pachyrhynchus =

Species of fish

Echelus pachyrhynchus is an eel in the family Ophichthidae (worm/snake eels). It was described by Léon Vaillant in 1888. It is a marine, deep water-dwelling eel which is known from the eastern Atlantic Ocean, including Morocco, Angola, Cape Verde, and Namibia. It dwells at a depth range of 200–500 m (660–1,640 ft), and inhabits burrows in mud or sand on the continental shelf. Males can reach a maximum total length of 48.5 cm (19.1 in).

Echelus pachyrhynchus feeds primarily on bony fish.
