= Molo snake eel =

Scientific classification
- Kingdom: Animalia
- Phylum: Chordata
- Class: Actinopterygii
- Order: Anguilliformes
- Family: Ophichthidae
- Genus: Hemerorhinus
- Species: H. heyningi

Binomial name
- Hemerorhinus heyningi (Weber, 1913)

Synonyms
- Sphagebranchus heyningi Weber, 1913

Species of fish

The Molo snake eel (Hemerorhinus heyningi) is an eel in the family Ophichthidae (worm/snake eels). It was described by Max Carl Wilhelm Weber in 1913. It is a marine, tropical eel which is known from Indonesia, in the Indo-Pacific. It dwells at a depth range of 69 to 91 metres (226 to 299 ft), and inhabits sandy sediments. Males can reach a maximum total length of 11.5 centimetres (4.5 in).
