= Smallfish snake eel =

Scientific classification
- Kingdom: Animalia
- Phylum: Chordata
- Class: Actinopterygii
- Order: Anguilliformes
- Family: Ophichthidae
- Genus: Quassiremus
- Species: Q. nothochir

Binomial name
- Quassiremus nothochir (Gilbert, 1890)

Synonyms
- Ophichthys nothochir Gilbert, 1890

Species of fish

The smallfish snake eel (Quassiremus nothochir, also known as the redsaddled snake eel in Mexico) is an eel in the family Ophichthidae (worm/snake eels). It was described by Charles Henry Gilbert in 1890 as a marine, tropical eel which is known from the eastern central Pacific Ocean, including Mexico, Nicaragua, Panama, the Gulf of California and Costa Rica. It dwells in shallow waters at a maximum depth of 20 metres (66 ft), and inhabits sand and rock sediments. Males can reach a maximum total length of 70 centimetres (28 in).

Due to its wide distribution in its region, its lack of known threats and lack of observed population decline, the IUCN redlist currently lists the Smallfish snake-eel as Least Concern.

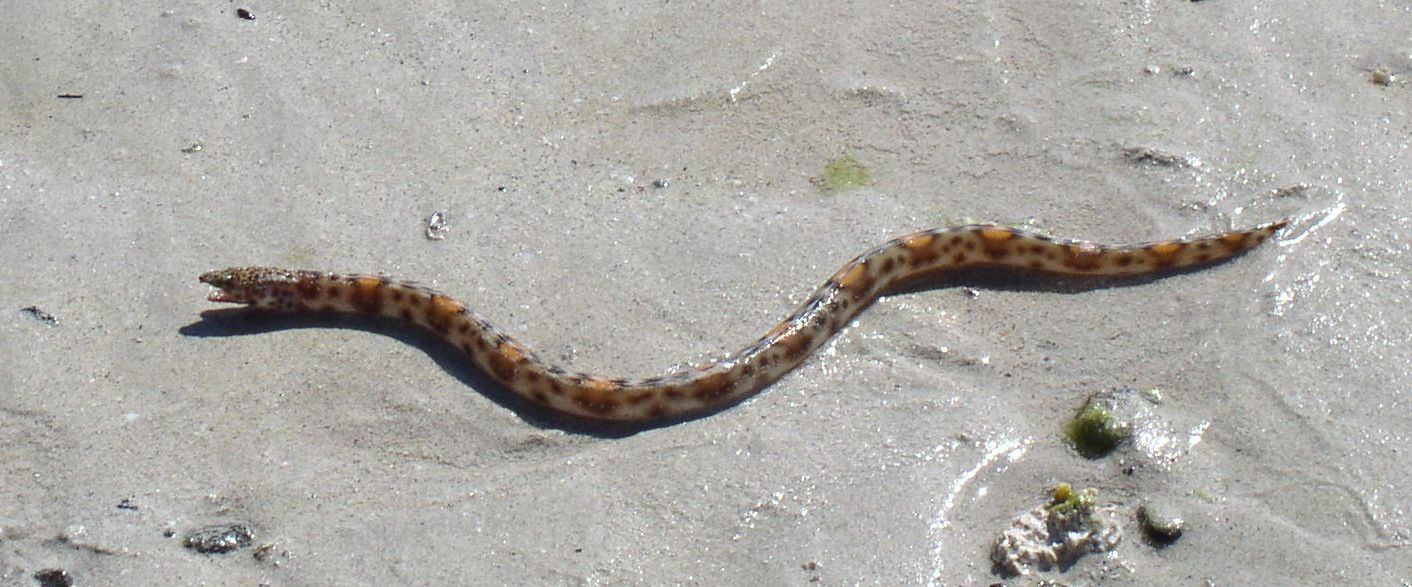
A Smallfish snake eel on the shore near La Paz, Mexico
