= Hemerorhinus opici =

Conservation status
- Data Deficient (IUCN 3.1)

Scientific classification
- Kingdom: Animalia
- Phylum: Chordata
- Class: Actinopterygii
- Order: Anguilliformes
- Family: Ophichthidae
- Genus: Hemerorhinus
- Species: H. opici

Binomial name
- Hemerorhinus opici Blache & Bauchot, 1972

Species of fish

Hemerorhinus opici is an eel in the family Ophichthidae (worm/snake eels). It was described by Jacques Blache and Marie-Louise Bauchot in 1972. It is a marine, tropical eel which is known from the eastern Atlantic Ocean, including Senegal and Angola. It inhabits shallow waters near to shore, and forms burrows in sand and mud substrates. Males can reach a maximum total length of 32.5 centimetres (12.8 in).

== Etymology ==
The fish is named in honor of Pierre Opic, who was the one who provided the illustrations for Blache's African anguilliform monographs.
