= Xyrias chioui =

Scientific classification
- Kingdom: Animalia
- Phylum: Chordata
- Class: Actinopterygii
- Order: Anguilliformes
- Family: Ophichthidae
- Genus: Xyrias
- Species: X. chioui

Binomial name
- Xyrias chioui J. E. McCosker, W. L. Chen & H. M. Chen, 2009

Species of fish

Xyrias chioui is an eel in the family Ophichthidae (worm/snake eels). It was described by John E. McCosker, Chen Wei-Li and Chen Hong-Ming in 2009. It is a marine, subtropical eel which is known from Taiwan, in the Pacific Ocean. It generally dwells at a depth range of 60–70 meters. Males can reach a maximum total length of 81.9 centimeters.

The species epithet "chioui" was given in honour of Captain Jiun-Shiun Chiou, who is credited with donating the type specimen of X. chioui, as well as other eel specimens of significance, to the National Taiwan Ocean University.
