= Broadnose worm eel =

Scientific classification
- Kingdom: Animalia
- Phylum: Chordata
- Class: Actinopterygii
- Order: Anguilliformes
- Family: Ophichthidae
- Genus: Myrophis
- Species: M. platyrhynchus

Binomial name
- Myrophis platyrhynchus Breder, 1927

Synonyms
- Myrophis emmae Howell Rivero, 1934

Species of fish

The Broadnose worm eel (Myrophis platyrhynchus) is an eel in the family Ophichthidae (worm/snake eels). It was described by Charles Marcus Breder Jr. in 1927. It is a tropical, marine eel which is known from the western central Atlantic Ocean, including Bermuda, the Bahamas, Cuba, Lesser Antilles, Belize, and Brazil. It is known to dwell at a depth of 186 metres, and inhabits protected or semi-protected bays and tidal creeks. Males can reach a maximum total length of 21 centimetres (8.3 in).
