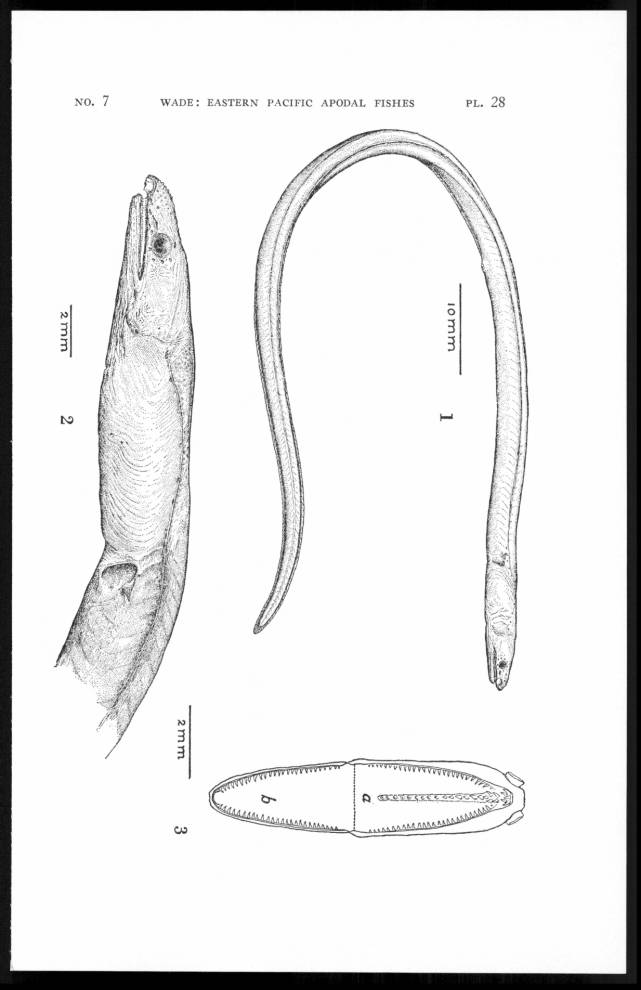

Scientific classification
- Kingdom: Animalia
- Phylum: Chordata
- Class: Actinopterygii
- Order: Anguilliformes
- Family: Ophichthidae
- Subfamily: Myrophinae
- Genus: Pseudomyrophis; Wade, 1946

Type species
- Pseudomyrophis micropinna Wade, 1946

Species
- See text.

= Pseudomyrophis =

Genus of fishes

Pseudomyrophis is a genus of eels in the snake eel family Ophichthidae. It currently contains the following species:

- Pseudomyrophis atlanticus Blache, 1975
- Pseudomyrophis frio (D. S. Jordan & B. M. Davis, 1891)
- Pseudomyrophis fugesae McCosker, E. B. Böhlke & J. E. Böhlke, 1989 (Diminutive worm-eel)
- Pseudomyrophis micropinna Wade, 1946 (Smallfin worm-eel)
- Pseudomyrophis nimius J. E. Böhlke, 1960
