= Leaden worm eel =

Scientific classification
- Kingdom: Animalia
- Phylum: Chordata
- Class: Actinopterygii
- Order: Anguilliformes
- Family: Ophichthidae
- Genus: Myrophis
- Species: M. plumbeus

Binomial name
- Myrophis plumbeus (Cope, 1871)

Synonyms
- Holopterura plumbea Cope, 1871; Paramyrus plumbeus (Cope, 1871); Myrophis longicollis Peters, 1864

Species of fish

The leaden worm eel (Myrophis plumbeus) is an eel in the family Ophichthidae (worm/snake eels). It was described by Edward Drinker Cope in 1871. It is a tropical, marine and brackish water-dwelling eel which is known from the eastern and western Atlantic Ocean, including Senegal, the Congo, Suriname, French Guiana, and Brazil. It inhabits bays and estuaries, and forms burrows in sand and mud sediments. Males can reach a maximum total length of 46.5 centimetres (1 ft 6.3 in), but more commonly reach a TL of 35 centimetres (1 ft 2 in).
