= Pylorobranchus hoi =

Scientific classification
- Domain: Eukaryota
- Kingdom: Animalia
- Phylum: Chordata
- Class: Actinopterygii
- Order: Anguilliformes
- Family: Ophichthidae
- Genus: Pylorobranchus
- Species: P. hoi

Binomial name
- Pylorobranchus hoi J. E. McCosker & H. M. Chen, 2012

Species of worm eel

Pylorobranchus hoi is a species of worm eel known from the waters off of eastern Taiwan. Lengths of 67.6 centimetres (26.6 in) TL for a female specimen and 56.8 centimetres (22.4 in) TL for a male specimen have been recorded.

== Etymology ==
The species name honors Taiwanese ichthyologist Hsuan-Ching Ho of the National Museum of Marine Biology & Aquarium, Pingtung.
