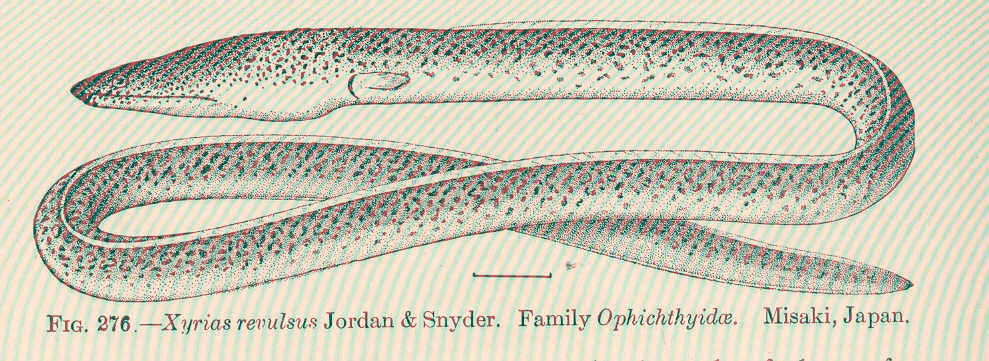

Scientific classification
- Kingdom: Animalia
- Phylum: Chordata
- Class: Actinopterygii
- Order: Anguilliformes
- Family: Ophichthidae
- Genus: Xyrias
- Species: X. revulsus

Binomial name
- Xyrias revulsus D. S. Jordan & Snyder, 1901

= Strict snake eel =

Species of fish

The strict snake eel (Xyrias revulsus) is an eel in the family Ophichthidae (worm/snake eels). It was described by David Starr Jordan and John Otterbein Snyder in 1901. It is a marine, temperate water-dwelling eel which is known from the Indo-Pacific, including Japan, the Philippines, the China Sea, and South Africa. It dwells at a depth range of 146 to 209 meters (479 to 686 ft). Males can reach a maximum total length of 93 centimeters (37 in).
