= Gordiichthys =

Scientific classification
- Domain: Eukaryota
- Kingdom: Animalia
- Phylum: Chordata
- Class: Actinopterygii
- Order: Anguilliformes
- Family: Ophichthidae
- Subfamily: Ophichthinae
- Genus: Gordiichthys; D. S. Jordan & B. M. Davis, 1891

Type species
- Gordiichthys irretitus D. S. Jordan & B. M. Davis, 1891

Species
- See text.

Genus of fishes

Gordiichthys is a genus of eels in the snake eel family Ophichthidae. It currently contains the following species:

- Gordiichthys combibus McCosker & Lavenberg, 2001
- Gordiichthys ergodes McCosker, E. B. Böhlke & J. E. Böhlke, 1989 (Irksome eel)
- Gordiichthys irretitus D. S. Jordan & B. M. Davis, 1891 (Horsehair eel)
- Gordiichthys leibyi McCosker & J. E. Böhlke, 1984 (String eel)
- Gordiichthys randalli McCosker & J. E. Böhlke, 1984
