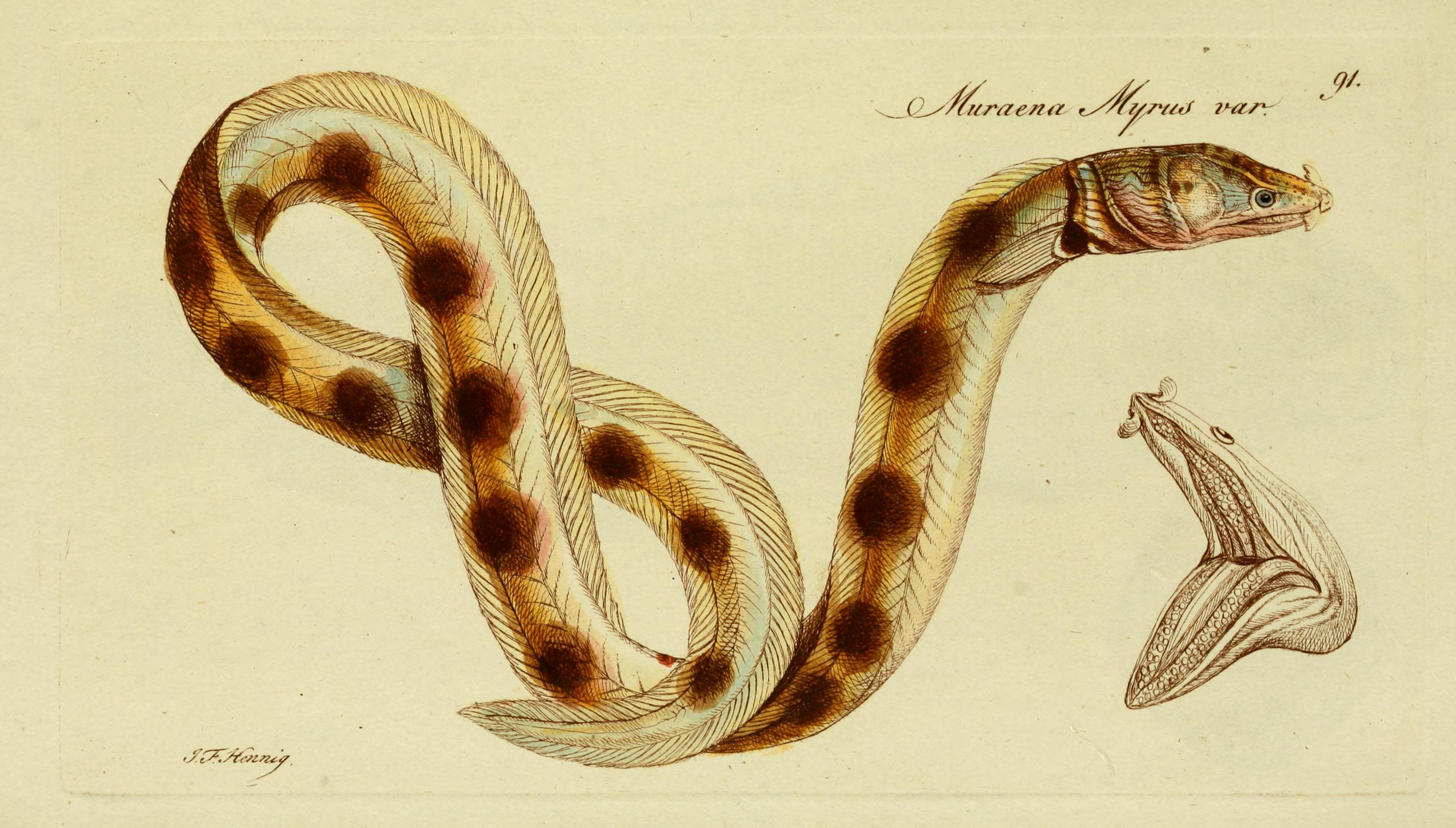

Conservation status
- Least Concern (IUCN 3.1)

Scientific classification
- Kingdom: Animalia
- Phylum: Chordata
- Class: Actinopterygii
- Division: Teleostei
- Order: Anguilliformes
- Family: Ophichthidae
- Genus: Echelus
- Species: E. myrus

Binomial name
- Echelus myrus (Linnaeus, 1758)

Synonyms
- Muraena myrus Linnaeus, 1758; Echelus punctatus Rafinesque, 1810; Muraena longicollis Cuvier, 1816; Muraena vulgaris Kaup, 1856; Myrus vulgaris (Kaup, 1856)

= Painted eel =

Species of fish

The painted eel (Echelus myrus) is an eel in the family Ophichthidae (worm/snake eels). It was described by Carl Linnaeus in 1758, originally under the genus Muraena. It is a marine, subtropical eel which is known from the eastern Atlantic Ocean, including the Bay of Biscay, the Republic of Congo, and the Mediterranean. It dwells at a depth range of 3 to 12 metres (9.8 to 39.4 ft), and inhabits burrows formed in sand and mud sediments in coastal lagoons and estuaries. Males can reach a maximum total length of 100 centimetres (39 in), but more commonly reach a TL of 60 centimetres (24 in).

The Painted eel is of minor commercial interest to fisheries. It has been recorded spawning in the Bay of Algiers during the months of August and September.
