= Ascensionis =

Ascensionis may refer to:

- Gastoniella ascensionis
- Procaris ascensionis
- Asplenium ascensionis
- Thalassoma ascensionis
- Quassiremus ascensionis
- Helcogramma ascensionis
- Marattia ascensionis
