= Muraena ophis =

The scientific name Muraena ophis is a synonym of either of two species of eel:

- Muraena ophis Linnaeus, 1758 is now Ophichthus ophis (Linnaeus, 1758)
- Muraena ophis Rüppell, 1830 is now Echidna nebulosa (Ahl, 1789)
