= Finned worm eel =

Conservation status
- Least Concern (IUCN 3.1)

Scientific classification
- Kingdom: Animalia
- Phylum: Chordata
- Class: Actinopterygii
- Order: Anguilliformes
- Family: Ophichthidae
- Genus: Echelus
- Species: E. uropterus

Binomial name
- Echelus uropterus (Temminck & Schlegel, 1846)

Synonyms
- Conger uropterus Temminck & Schlegel, 1846; Myrophis uropterus (Temminck & Schlegel, 1846)

Species of fish

The Finned worm eel (Echelus uropterus, also known as the Finned snake eel in Australia) is an eel in the family Ophichthidae (worm/snake eels). It was described by Coenraad Jacob Temminck and Hermann Schlegel in 1846. It is a marine, tropical eel which is known from the Indo-Pacific, including East Africa, the Society Islands, and southern Japan. It is known to dwell in reefs. It is the only worm eel in its region which possesses pectoral fins. Males can reach a maximum total length of 60 centimetres.

The Finned worm eel's diet consists of bony fish and benthic crustaceans such as crabs, shrimp, prawns, amphipods and stomatopods.
