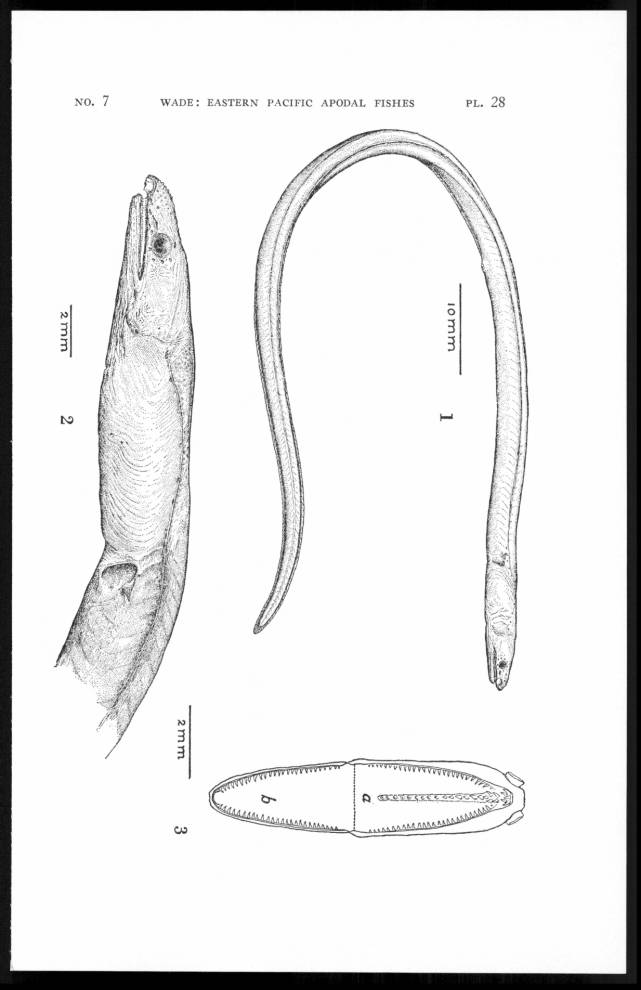

Scientific classification
- Kingdom: Animalia
- Phylum: Chordata
- Class: Actinopterygii
- Order: Anguilliformes
- Family: Ophichthidae
- Genus: Pseudomyrophis
- Species: P. micropinna

Binomial name
- Pseudomyrophis micropinna Wade, 1946

= Smallfin worm-eel =

Species of fish

The Smallfin worm-eel (Pseudomyrophis micropinna, also known as the Plain worm eel) is an eel in the family Ophichthidae (worm/snake eels). It was described by Charles Barkley Wade in 1946. It is a marine, tropical eel which is known from the eastern central and southeastern Pacific Ocean, including Nicaragua, Colombia, Panama and Costa Rica. It dwells at a depth range of 100 to 200 metres (330 to 660 ft), and inhabits sediments of mud. Males can reach a maximum total length of 16 centimetres (6.3 in).

Due to its wide distribution, lack of known threats, and lack of observed population decline, the IUCN redlist currently lists the Smallfin worm-eel as Least Concern.
