= Fintail serpent eel =

Scientific classification
- Kingdom: Animalia
- Phylum: Chordata
- Class: Actinopterygii
- Order: Anguilliformes
- Family: Ophichthidae
- Genus: Neenchelys
- Species: N. buitendijki

Binomial name
- Neenchelys buitendijki Weber & de Beaufort, 1916

Species of fish

The fintail serpent eel (Neenchelys buitendijki, also known commonly as the spotted worm-eel in India) is an eel in the family Ophichthidae (worm/snake eels). It was described by Max Carl Wilhelm Weber and Lieven Ferdinand de Beaufort in 1916. It is a marine, tropical eel which is known from the Indian Ocean, including Pakistan, India, Indonesia, and Vietnam. It inhabits burrows in soft sediments, and leads a nocturnal lifestyle. Males can reach a maximum total length of 30 centimetres.

The fintail serpent eel is of minor commercial interest to fisheries, and is primarily used for fishing bait.
