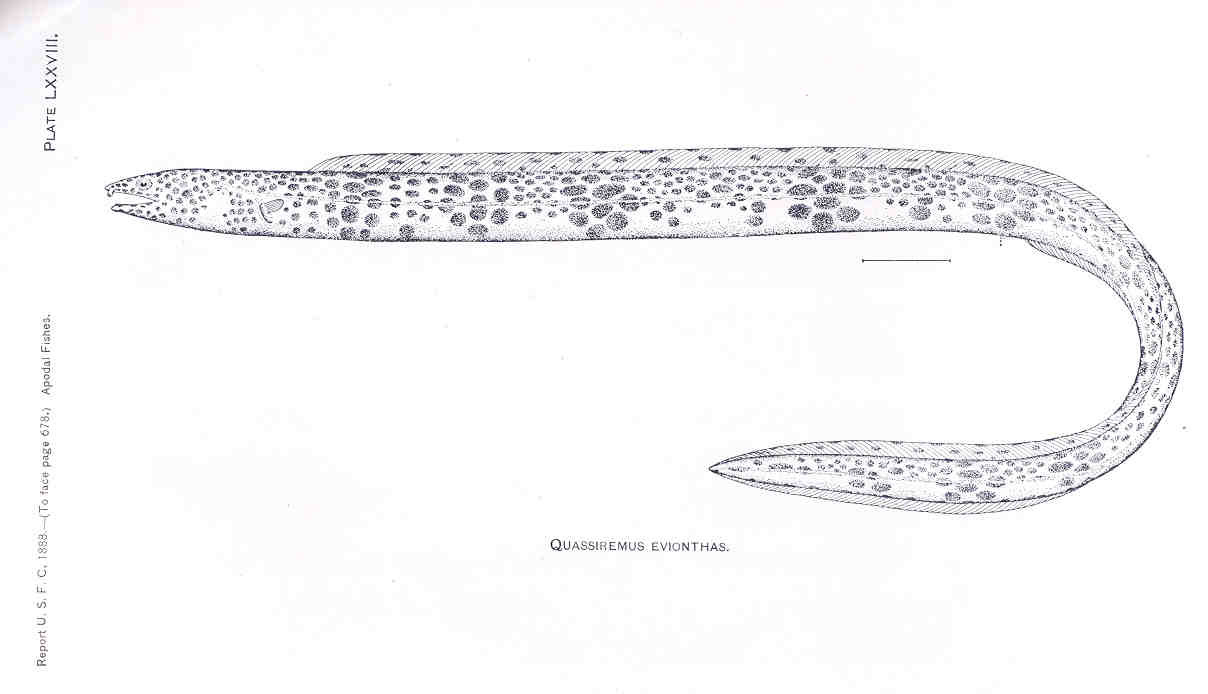

Scientific classification
- Domain: Eukaryota
- Kingdom: Animalia
- Phylum: Chordata
- Class: Actinopterygii
- Order: Anguilliformes
- Family: Ophichthidae
- Genus: Quassiremus
- Species: Q. evionthas

Binomial name
- Quassiremus evionthas (Jordan & Bollman, 1890)

Synonyms
- Ophichthus evionthas Jordan & Bollman, 1890

= Galapagos snake eel =

Species of fish

The Galapagos snake eel (Quassiremus evionthas) is an eel in the family Ophichthidae (worm/snake eels). It was described by David Starr Jordan and Charles Harvey Bollman in 1890. It is a marine, tropical eel which is known from the eastern central and southeastern Pacific Ocean, including Colombia, the Gulf of California, Costa Rica, the Galapagos Islands in Ecuador, and Clarion Island in the Revillagigedo Archipelago in Mexico. It dwells at a depth range of 3 to 80 metres (9.8 to 262.5 ft), and inhabits reefs, preferring to live in areas bearing a mixture of boulders, gravel and sand. Males can reach a maximum total length of 71 centimetres (28 in).

The IUCN redlist currently lists the Galapagos snake eel as Vulnerable under Criterion D2, in lieu of the potential threat to population levels for shallow-water fish in the eastern tropical Pacific, caused by longer and more frequent ENSO events. No conservation actions have been taken specifically for the species, although it occurs in the Marine Protected Areas of the Galapagos, Cocos and Malpelo Island.
