= Neenchelys microtretus =

Scientific classification
- Domain: Eukaryota
- Kingdom: Animalia
- Phylum: Chordata
- Class: Actinopterygii
- Order: Anguilliformes
- Family: Ophichthidae
- Genus: Neenchelys
- Species: N. microtretus

Binomial name
- Neenchelys microtretus Bamber, 1915

Species of fish

Neenchelys microtretus is an eel in the family Ophichthidae (worm/snake eels). It was described by R.C. Bamber in 1915. It is a marine, temperate, water-dwelling eel which is known from the Red Sea, in the western Indian Ocean.
