= Fringe-lipped worm-eel =

Scientific classification
- Domain: Eukaryota
- Kingdom: Animalia
- Phylum: Chordata
- Class: Actinopterygii
- Order: Anguilliformes
- Family: Ophichthidae
- Genus: Schultzidia
- Species: S. retropinnis

Binomial name
- Schultzidia retropinnis (Fowler, 1934)

Synonyms
- Muraenichthys retropinnis Fowler, 1934

Species of fish

The Fringe-lipped worm-eel (Schultzidia retropinnis) is an eel in the family Ophichthidae (worm/snake eels). It was described by Henry Weed Fowler in 1934. It is a marine, tropical eel which is known from the western central Pacific Ocean, including Taratara Island, Samar Island, the Philippines, the Marshall Islands, Micronesia and Solomon Island. It dwells at a maximum depth of 48 metres (157 ft), and inhabits benthic sand sediments in coral reefs. Males can reach a maximum total length of 11.5 centimetres (4.5 in).
