= Short-maned sand-eel =

Scientific classification
- Kingdom: Animalia
- Phylum: Chordata
- Class: Actinopterygii
- Order: Anguilliformes
- Family: Ophichthidae
- Genus: Phaenomonas
- Species: P. cooperae

Binomial name
- Phaenomonas cooperae Palmer, 1970

Synonyms
- Phaenomonas cooperi Palmer, 1970

Species of fish

The Short-maned sand-eel (Phaenomonas cooperae) is an eel in the family Ophichthidae (worm/snake eels). It was described by Geoffrey Palmer in 1970. It is a marine, tropical eel which is known from the Indo-Pacific, including the Red Sea, the Aldabra Islands, the Hawaiian Islands, and the Marquesan Islands. It is known to dwell at a depth of 60 metres (200 ft), and leads a benthic lifestyle. Males can reach a maximum total length of 59 centimetres (23 in).
