= Skythrenchelys macrostoma =

Scientific classification
- Kingdom: Animalia
- Phylum: Chordata
- Class: Actinopterygii
- Order: Anguilliformes
- Family: Ophichthidae
- Genus: Skythrenchelys
- Species: S. macrostoma

Binomial name
- Skythrenchelys macrostoma (Bleeker, 1864)

Synonyms
- Muraenichthys macrostomus Bleeker, 1864; Skythrenchelys lentiginosa Castle & McCosker, 1999

Species of fish

Skythrenchelys macrostoma, also known as the large-mouth angry worm eel, is a species of eel in the family Ophichthidae. It is a marine, tropical eel which is known from the Indo-Pacific Ocean, including Red Sea.
