= McCosker's worm eel =

Conservation status
- Least Concern (IUCN 3.1)

Scientific classification
- Kingdom: Animalia
- Phylum: Chordata
- Class: Actinopterygii
- Order: Anguilliformes
- Family: Ophichthidae
- Genus: Neenchelys
- Species: N. mccoskeri

Binomial name
- Neenchelys mccoskeri Y. Hibino, H. C. Ho & Seishi Kimura, 2012

Species of fish

McCosker's worm eel (Neenchelys mccoskeri) is a species of fish in the worm eel family Ophichthidae. It was first described by Yusuke Hibino, Ho Hsuan-Ching, and Seishi Kimura in 2012. It is a marine, deep water-dwelling eel which is known from the northwestern Pacific Ocean, including Taiwan and Japan. It dwells at a depth range of 100 to 400 metres (330 to 1,310 ft), and leads a benthic lifestyle; it is collected by bottom trawlers. Males can reach a maximum total length of 52.2 centimetres (20.6 in).

== Etymology ==
The species epithet "mccoskeri" was given in honour of American ichthyologist John E. McCosker.
