= Irksone eel =

Conservation status
- Data Deficient (IUCN 3.1)

Scientific classification
- Kingdom: Animalia
- Phylum: Chordata
- Class: Actinopterygii
- Order: Anguilliformes
- Family: Ophichthidae
- Genus: Gordiichthys
- Species: G. ergodes

Binomial name
- Gordiichthys ergodes McCosker, E. B. Böhlke & J. E. Böhlke, 1989

Species of fish

The Irksone eel (Gordiichthys ergodes) is an eel in the family Ophichthidae (worm/snake eels). It was described by John E. McCosker, Eugenia Brandt Böhlke, and James Erwin Böhlke in 1989. It is a marine, temperate water-dwelling eel which is known from a single specimen discovered in the northeastern Gulf of Mexico, in the western central Atlantic Ocean. From the holotype, it is known to dwell at a depth range of 10 to 189 meters (33 to 620 ft).
