= Pseudomyrophis nimius =

Scientific classification
- Kingdom: Animalia
- Phylum: Chordata
- Class: Actinopterygii
- Order: Anguilliformes
- Family: Ophichthidae
- Genus: Pseudomyrophis
- Species: P. nimius

Binomial name
- Pseudomyrophis nimius Böhlke, 1960

Species of fish

Pseudomyrophis nimius is an eel in the family Ophichthidae (worm/snake eels). It was described by James Erwin Böhlke in 1960. It is a marine, subtropical eel which is known from the Atlantic Ocean, including Angola, the Gulf of Mexico, and Florida Atlantic. It is known to dwell at a depth range of 320 to 755 metres (1,050 to 2,477 ft). Males can reach a maximum total length of 36.7 centimetres (14.4 in).
