= Herpetoichthys fossatus =

Conservation status
- Least Concern (IUCN 3.1)

Scientific classification
- Kingdom: Animalia
- Phylum: Chordata
- Class: Actinopterygii
- Order: Anguilliformes
- Family: Ophichthidae
- Genus: Herpetoichthys
- Species: H. fossatus

Binomial name
- Herpetoichthys fossatus (Myers & Wade, 1941)

Synonyms
- Pogonophis fossatus Myers & Wade, 1941

Species of fish

Herpetoichthys fossatus, the mustachioed snake-eel, is a species of eel in the family Ophichthidae. It is found in the Gulf of California.
