= Myrophis lepturus =

Scientific classification
- Domain: Eukaryota
- Kingdom: Animalia
- Phylum: Chordata
- Class: Actinopterygii
- Order: Anguilliformes
- Family: Ophichthidae
- Genus: Myrophis
- Species: M. lepturus

Binomial name
- Myrophis lepturus Kotthaus, 1968

Species of fish

Myrophis lepturus is an eel in the family Ophichthidae (worm/snake eels). It was described by Adolf Kotthaus in 1968. It is a marine, tropical eel which is known from the Gulf of Aden in the western Indian Ocean. It is known to dwell at a depth of 60 metres (200 ft).
