= Mixomyrophis pusillipinna =

Scientific classification
- Kingdom: Animalia
- Phylum: Chordata
- Class: Actinopterygii
- Order: Anguilliformes
- Family: Ophichthidae
- Genus: Mixomyrophis
- Species: M. pusillipinna

Binomial name
- Mixomyrophis pusillipinna McCosker, 1985

Species of fish

Mixomyrophis pusillipinna is a species of eel in the family Ophichthidae. It is known only from the Atlantic Ocean in the vicinity of Anguilla.
