= Longfin worm eel =

Scientific classification
- Kingdom: Animalia
- Phylum: Chordata
- Class: Actinopterygii
- Order: Anguilliformes
- Family: Ophichthidae
- Genus: Myrophis
- Species: M. anterodorsalis

Binomial name
- Myrophis anterodorsalis McCosker, E. B. Böhlke & J. E. Böhlke, 1989

Species of fish

The longfin worm eel (Myrophis anterodorsalis) is an eel in the family Ophichthidae (worm/snake eels). It was described by John E. McCosker, Eugenia Brandt Böhlke and James Erwin Böhlke in 1989. It is a marine, tropical eel which is known from Colombia, in the western central Atlantic Ocean. It is known to dwell within one meter of the surface.
