= Phaenomonas longissima =

Conservation status
- Least Concern (IUCN 3.1)

Scientific classification
- Kingdom: Animalia
- Phylum: Chordata
- Class: Actinopterygii
- Order: Anguilliformes
- Family: Ophichthidae
- Genus: Phaenomonas
- Species: P. longissima

Binomial name
- Phaenomonas longissima (Cadenat & Marchal, 1963)

Synonyms
- Callechelys longissimus Cadenat & Marchal, 1963; Bascanichthys longissimus (Cadenat & Marchal, 1963); Phaenomonas longissimus (Cadenat & Marchal, 1963); Sphagebranchus foresti Cadenat & Roux, 1964; Apterichtus foresti (Cadenat & Roux, 1964); Ethadophis foresti (Cadenat & Roux, 1964); Microrhynchus foresti (Cadenat & Roux, 1964); Phaenomonas foresti (Cadenat & Roux, 1964); Microrhynchus epinepheli Blache & Bauchot, 1972; Apterichtus epinepheli (Blache & Bauchot, 1972); Ethadophis epinepheli (Blache & Bauchot, 1972); Phaenomonas epinepheli (Blache & Bauchot, 1972); Apterichtus epinephili (Blache & Bauchot, 1972)

Species of fish

Phaenomonas longissima, also known as the short-maned sand eel in St. Helena, is an eel in the family Ophichthidae (worm/snake eels). It was described by Jean Cadenat and Émile Marchal in 1963, originally under the genus Callechelys. It is a marine, tropical eel which is known from the Atlantic Ocean, including Ascension Island, St. Helena, Brazil, Senegal, Ghana, and Cape Verde. It dwells at a depth range of 25 to 35 metres (82 to 115 ft), and forms burrows in sand and mud sediments on the continental shelf. Males can reach a maximum total length of 50 centimetres (20 in).
