= Johnston snake eel =

Conservation status
- Least Concern (IUCN 3.1)

Scientific classification
- Kingdom: Animalia
- Phylum: Chordata
- Class: Actinopterygii
- Order: Anguilliformes
- Family: Ophichthidae
- Genus: Schultzidia
- Species: S. johnstonensis

Binomial name
- Schultzidia johnstonensis (Schultz & Woods, 1949)

Synonyms
- Muraenichthys johnstonensis Schultz & Woods, 1949

Species of fish

The Johnston snake eel (Schultzidia johnstonensis), also known as the peppered worm eel in Micronesia and Hawaii is an eel in the family Ophichthidae (worm/snake eels). It was described by Leonard Peter Schultz and Loren P. Woods in 1949. It is a marine, tropical eel, which is known from the Indo-Pacific region, including the Chagos Islands, Hawaii, the Marquesan Islands, the Society Islands, Australia, and New Caledonia. It dwells at a depth range of 2–23 m, and inhabits sand sediments in coral reefs. It can reach a maximum total length of 35 cm.

The Johnston snake eel's diet consists of crabs, prawns, and small finfish.
