= Speckled snake eel =

Scientific classification
- Kingdom: Animalia
- Phylum: Chordata
- Class: Actinopterygii
- Order: Anguilliformes
- Family: Ophichthidae
- Genus: Xyrias
- Species: X. multiserialis

Binomial name
- Xyrias multiserialis (Norman, 1939)

Synonyms
- Ophichthus multiserialis Norman, 1939; Ophisurus multiserialis (Norman, 1939)

Species of fish

The speckled snake eel (Xyrias multiserialis) is an eel in the family Ophichthidae (worm/snake eels). It was described by John Roxborough Norman in 1939, originally under the genus Ophichthus. It is a marine, tropical eel which is known from the western Indian Ocean, including the Gulf of Aden and Somalia. It dwells at a depth range of 11 to 322 metres (36 to 1,056 ft). Males can reach a maximum total length of 62.5 centimetres (24.6 in), while females can reach a maximum TL of 75.2 centimetres (29.6 in).
