= Pseudomyrophis atlanticus =

Scientific classification
- Kingdom: Animalia
- Phylum: Chordata
- Class: Actinopterygii
- Order: Anguilliformes
- Family: Ophichthidae
- Genus: Pseudomyrophis
- Species: P. atlanticus

Binomial name
- Pseudomyrophis atlanticus Blache, 1975

Species of fish

Pseudomyrophis atlanticus is an eel in the family Ophichthidae (worm/snake eels). It was described by Jacques Blache in 1975. It is a marine, tropical eel which is known from the eastern Atlantic Ocean (from which its species epithet is derived), including Senegal and Angola. It dwells at a depth range of 40 to 100 metres (130 to 330 ft), and inhabits the continental shelf, where it forms burrows in sand and mud. Males can reach a maximum total length of 25.9 centimetres (10.2 in).
