= Xyrias guineensis =

Scientific classification
- Domain: Eukaryota
- Kingdom: Animalia
- Phylum: Chordata
- Class: Actinopterygii
- Order: Anguilliformes
- Family: Ophichthidae
- Genus: Xyrias
- Species: X. guineensis

Binomial name
- Xyrias guineensis (Blache, 1975)

Synonyms
- Ophisurus guineensis Blache, 1975

Species of fish

Xyrias guineensis is an eel in the family Ophichthidae (worm/snake eels). It was described by Jacques Blache in 1975, originally under the genus Ophisurus. It is a marine, deep water-dwelling eel which is known from Pointe Noire, Congo, in the eastern Atlantic Ocean. It is known to dwell at a depth of 300 metres (980 ft), and inhabits burrows formed in sand and mud sediments on the continental shelf. Males can reach a maximum total length of 63.6 centimetres (25.0 in).
