= Angry worm eel =

Conservation status
- Least Concern (IUCN 3.1)

Scientific classification
- Kingdom: Animalia
- Phylum: Chordata
- Class: Actinopterygii
- Order: Anguilliformes
- Family: Ophichthidae
- Genus: Skythrenchelys
- Species: S. zabra

Binomial name
- Skythrenchelys zabra Castle & McCosker, 1999

Species of fish

The angry worm eel (Skythrenchelys zabra) is an eel in the family Ophichthidae (worm/snake eels). It was described by Peter Henry John Castle and John E. McCosker in 1999. It is a tropical, marine eel which is known from the eastern Indian and western central Pacific Ocean, including India, Indonesia, the Straits of Malacca, northern Australia, and the Philippines. It is known to inhabit shallow, turbid estuaries, and to a lesser extent the deeper water over soft substrates. Males can reach a maximum total length of 29.6 centimetres.

The angry worm eel (Skythrenchelys zabra) has a long, thin, brown body and lacks pectoral fins. It has a large gill opening below the body. It has very small eyes, with nonuniform teeth.

The species epithet "zabra" refers to the eel's ability to consume large prey. Due to its wide distribution and variety of habitats, the IUCN redlist currently lists the angry worm eel as Least Concern.
