= Quassiremus polyclitellum =

Scientific classification
- Kingdom: Animalia
- Phylum: Chordata
- Class: Actinopterygii
- Order: Anguilliformes
- Family: Ophichthidae
- Genus: Quassiremus
- Species: Q. polyclitellum

Binomial name
- Quassiremus polyclitellum Castle, 1996

Species of fish

Quassiremus polyclitellum is an eel in the family Ophichthidae (worm/snake eels). It was described by Peter Henry John Castle in 1996. It is a marine, temperate water-dwelling eel which is known from New Zealand, in the southwestern Pacific Ocean. It dwells at a depth range 35 to 58 metres (115 to 190 ft), and inhabits rocky surfaces. Males can reach a maximum standard length of 79.5 centimetres (31.3 in).
