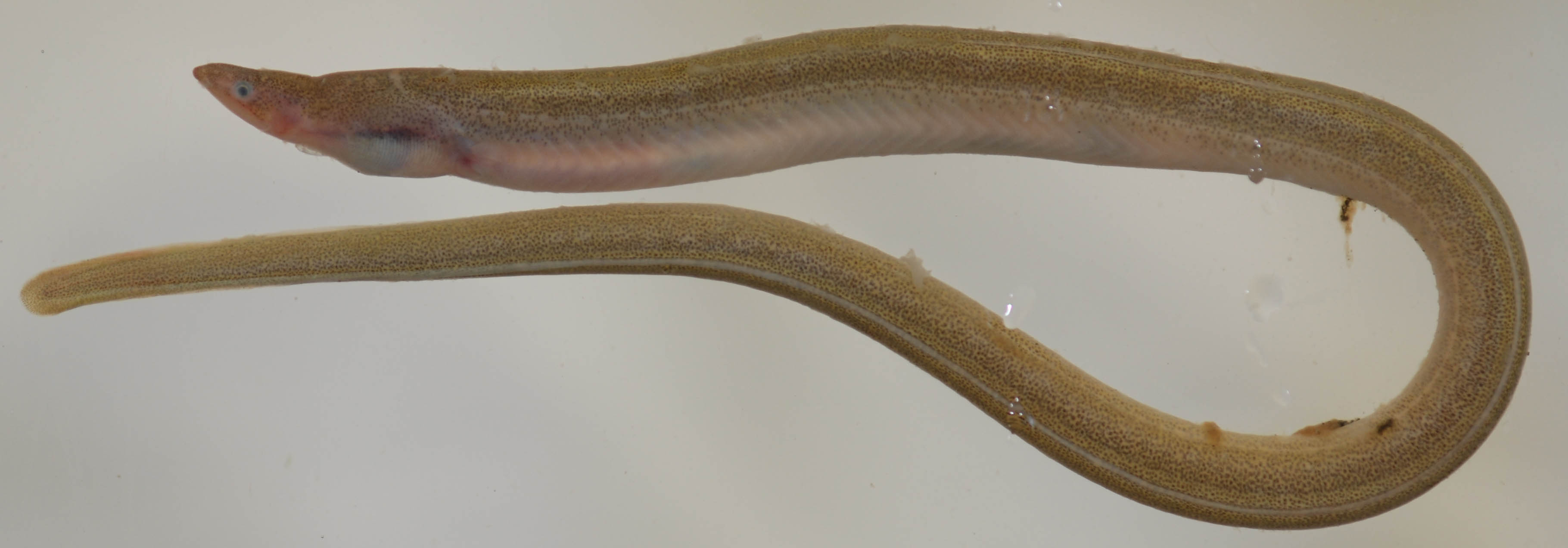

Conservation status
- Least Concern (IUCN 3.1)

Scientific classification
- Kingdom: Animalia
- Phylum: Chordata
- Class: Actinopterygii
- Division: Teleostei
- Order: Anguilliformes
- Family: Ophichthidae
- Genus: Myrophis
- Species: M. punctatus

Binomial name
- Myrophis punctatus Lütken, 1852

Synonyms
- Leptocephalus mollis

= Speckled worm eel =

Species of fish

The speckled worm-eel, Myrophis punctatus, is a member of the Ophichthidae (snake eel) family. It was described by Christian Frederik Lütken in 1852. M. punctatus have brown bodies that are lighter on the ventral side than the dorsal side. The upper body is speckled with pepper-like black spots. The snout is pointed. They grow to a maximum size of 35.3 centimetres (1 ft 1.9 in).

== Habitat and distribution ==
The eel's depth range is 0.4m-750m, while the temperature range is 6.975°C – 27.717°C. The speckled worm eel is a benthic species. It lives in tropical marine and brackish habitats that range from seagrass beds and mangroves to offshore reefs. They are found in the Western Atlantic around the island of Bermuda; from North Carolina to Brazil; throughout the Gulf of Mexico, the West Indies, and the coast of Central America; and all through the Caribbean.

== Reproduction ==
This species makes significant seasonal migrations. They migrate to the sea to spawn. They have leptocephalus larvae. Usually only juveniles are found inshore. They appear along the coast between December and May, from drifting in from offshore spawning areas.

== Other information ==
They are caught as baitfish along the northern Brazilian coast using ichthyotoxic plants. Their locomotion type is balistiform. Lobotes surinamensis and Thunnus thynnus thynnus feed on Myrophis punctatus.
