= Many-vertebrae snake eel =

Scientific classification
- Kingdom: Animalia
- Phylum: Chordata
- Class: Actinopterygii
- Order: Anguilliformes
- Family: Ophichthidae
- Genus: Echelus
- Species: E. polyspondylus

Binomial name
- Echelus polyspondylus McCosker & Ho, 2015

Species of fish

The many-vertebrae snake eel (Echelus polyspondylus) is a species of ray-finned fish native to the Northwest Pacific.

== Description ==
The species measures 331 to 561 mm (13.0 to 22.1 in). It has many small cone-like teeth which marginally points backwards. It has a long body with the tail making up the majority of the body length (65 to 69%). The very end of the tail is stretchable and the pectoral fin is sharp. The dorsal area is yellowish-brown, the undersides are lightly colored, and the anal-fin which is black is covered around pale areas of either fin.
