= Elastic eel =

Scientific classification
- Kingdom: Animalia
- Phylum: Chordata
- Class: Actinopterygii
- Order: Anguilliformes
- Family: Ophichthidae
- Genus: Phaenomonas
- Species: P. pinnata

Binomial name
- Phaenomonas pinnata Myers & Wade, 1941

Synonyms
- Leptocephalus alternatus Fowler 1938

Species of fish

The elastic eel (Phaenomonas pinnata) is an eel in the family Ophichthidae (worm/snake eels). It was described by George S. Myers and Charles Barkley Wade in 1941. It is a tropical, marine eel which is known from the eastern central and southeastern Pacific Ocean, including Colombia, Ecuador, Costa Rica, and Mexico. It dwells at a depth range of 1–35 metres, inhabiting sandy bottoms. Males can reach a maximum total length of 53.5 centimetres.

Due to the relatively wide distribution of the Elastic eel, as well as a lack of known threats or observed population decline, the IUCN redlist currently lists the species as Least Concern. Its distribution does, however, partially include marine protected areas, such as those in the Gulf of California.
