= Neenchelys daedalus =

Scientific classification
- Kingdom: Animalia
- Phylum: Chordata
- Class: Actinopterygii
- Order: Anguilliformes
- Family: Ophichthidae
- Genus: Neenchelys
- Species: N. daedalus

Binomial name
- Neenchelys daedalus McCosker, 1982

Species of fish

Neenchelys daedalus is an eel in the family Ophichthidae (worm/snake eels). It was described by John E. McCosker in 1982. It is a marine, tropical eel which is known from the western Pacific Ocean, including Papua New Guinea and Japan.
