= Diminutive worm eel =

Scientific classification
- Kingdom: Animalia
- Phylum: Chordata
- Class: Actinopterygii
- Order: Anguilliformes
- Family: Ophichthidae
- Genus: Pseudomyrophis
- Species: P. fugesae

Binomial name
- Pseudomyrophis fugesae McCosker, E. B. Böhlke & J. E. Böhlke, 1989

Species of fish

The Diminutive worm eel (Pseudomyrophis fugesae) is an eel in the family Ophichthidae (worm/snake eels). It was described by John E. McCosker, Eugenia Brandt Böhlke and James Erwin Böhlke in 1989. It is a marine, temperate water-dwelling eel which is known from the western Atlantic Ocean.
