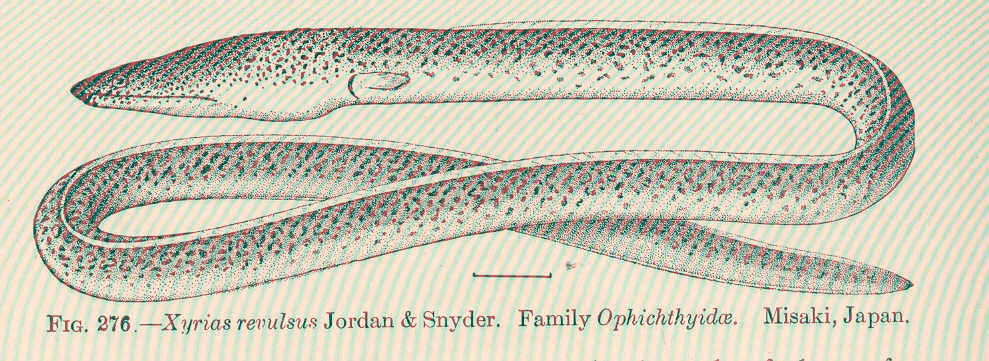

Scientific classification
- Kingdom: Animalia
- Phylum: Chordata
- Class: Actinopterygii
- Order: Anguilliformes
- Family: Ophichthidae
- Subfamily: Ophichthinae
- Genus: Xyrias; D. S. Jordan & Snyder, 1901

Type species
- Xyrias revulsus D.S. Jordan & Snyder 1901

Species
- See text.

= Xyrias =

Genus of fishes

Xyrias is a genus of eels in the snake eel family Ophichthidae. It currently contains the following species:

- Xyrias chioui McCosker, W. L. Chen & H. M. Chen, 2009
- Xyrias guineensis (Blache, 1975)
- Xyrias multiserialis (Norman, 1939) (Speckled snake eel)
- Xyrias revulsus D. S. Jordan & Snyder, 1901 (Strict snake eel)
