= Pylorobranchus =

Scientific classification
- Domain: Eukaryota
- Kingdom: Animalia
- Phylum: Chordata
- Class: Actinopterygii
- Order: Anguilliformes
- Family: Ophichthidae
- Subfamily: Myrophinae
- Genus: Pylorobranchus; J. E. McCosker & H. M. Chen, 2012

Type species
- Pylorobranchus hoi McCosker & Hong-Ming Chen, 2012

Genus of fishes

Pylorobranchus is a genus of worm eel known from the waters off of eastern Taiwan and from the Philippines.

== Species ==
There are currently 2 recognized species in this genus:

- Pylorobranchus hearstorum J. E. McCosker, 2014 (Gigantic worm eel)
- Pylorobranchus hoi J. E. McCosker & H. M. Chen, 2012

== Etymology ==
The genus name is derived from the Greek pylorus, meaning "gatekeeper" and branchos meaning "gill" in reference to a unique lappet-like structure in front of the gill opening.
