= Gordiichthys randalli =

Conservation status
- Least Concern (IUCN 3.1)

Scientific classification
- Kingdom: Animalia
- Phylum: Chordata
- Class: Actinopterygii
- Order: Anguilliformes
- Family: Ophichthidae
- Genus: Gordiichthys
- Species: G. randalli

Binomial name
- Gordiichthys randalli McCosker & Böhlke, 1984

Species of fish

Gordiichthys randalli is an eel in the family Ophichthidae (worm/snake eels). It was described by John E. McCosker and James Erwin Böhlke in 1984. It is a marine, tropical eel which is known from Puerto Rico, in the western central Atlantic Ocean. It dwells at a depth range of 8 to 12 metres (26 to 39 ft), and inhabits sand and algal beds in shallow water.
