= Herpetoichthys =

Scientific classification
- Kingdom: Animalia
- Phylum: Chordata
- Class: Actinopterygii
- Order: Anguilliformes
- Family: Ophichthidae
- Subfamily: Ophichthinae
- Genus: Herpetoichthys; Kaup, 1856

Type species
- Herpetoichthys ornatissimus Kaup, 1856

Synonyms
- Pogonophis G. S. Myers & Wade, 1941

Species of fish

Herpetoichthys is a genus of marine ray-finned fishes belonging to the subfamily Ophichthinae, the snake eels, in the family Ophichthidae, which also includes the worm eels. These eels are found in the Eastern pacific and Eastern Atlantic Ocean.

== Species ==
There are two valid species:

- Herpetoichthys fossatus (Myers & Wade, 1941) (Mustachioed snake-eel)
- Herpetoichthys regius (Richardson, 1848) (Ornate snake eel)
