= Mixomyrophis =

Scientific classification
- Domain: Eukaryota
- Kingdom: Animalia
- Phylum: Chordata
- Class: Actinopterygii
- Order: Anguilliformes
- Family: Ophichthidae
- Subfamily: Myrophinae
- Genus: Mixomyrophis; J. E. McCosker, 1985

Type species
- Mixomyrophis pusillipinna McCosker, 1985

Genus of fishes

Mixomyrophis is a genus of eel in the family Ophichthidae. It is known only from the Atlantic Ocean and Red Sea in the vicinity of Anguilla and Israel.

== Species ==
There are currently 2 recognized species in this genus:

- Mixomyrophis longidorsalis Hibino, Kimura & Golani, 2014 (Red Sea worm eel)
- Mixomyrophis pusillipinna J. E. McCosker, 1985
