= Xestochilus =

Conservation status
- Least Concern (IUCN 3.1)

Scientific classification
- Kingdom: Animalia
- Phylum: Chordata
- Class: Actinopterygii
- Order: Anguilliformes
- Family: Ophichthidae
- Subfamily: Ophichthinae
- Genus: Xestochilus; McCosker, 1998
- Species: X. nebulosus

Binomial name
- Xestochilus nebulosus (J. L. B. Smith, 1962)

Synonyms
- Callechelys nebulosus J. L. B. Smith, 1962

Genus of eel in the family Ophichthidae

Xestochilus is a genus of eel in the family Ophichthidae. The genus contains one species being Xestochilus nebulosus, nebulosus snake eel. X. nebulosus lives in the indo-pacific ocean in 2 to 42 meter deep waters. The nebulosus snake eel are found in tidepools, weed bottoms and sand inside tropical waters. The species max length is 47 centimeters.
