= Neenchelys =

Scientific classification
- Domain: Eukaryota
- Kingdom: Animalia
- Phylum: Chordata
- Class: Actinopterygii
- Order: Anguilliformes
- Family: Ophichthidae
- Subfamily: Myrophinae
- Genus: Neenchelys; Bamber, 1915

Type species
- Neenchelys microtretus Bamber, 1915

Genus of fishes

Neenchelys is a genus of snake eels native to the Indian Ocean and the western Pacific Ocean. All species of Neenchelys have two rather than three preopercular pores (except for N. parvipectoralis which usually has one), a significant character among many species of ophichthids (McCosker 1977).

== Species ==
There are currently 12 recognized species in this genus:

- Neenchelys andamanensis Hibino, Satapoomin & Kimura, 2015 (Andaman worm eel)
- Neenchelys buitendijki M. C. W. Weber & de Beaufort, 1916 (Fin-tail worm eel)
- Neenchelys cheni (J. S. T. F. Chen & H. T. C. Weng, 1967) (Chen's worm eel)
- Neenchelys daedalus J. E. McCosker, 1982 (New Guinea worm eel)
- Neenchelys diaphora H. C. Ho, J. E. McCosker & D. G. Smith, 2015 (Long-fin worm eel)
- Neenchelys gracilis H. C. Ho & K. H. Loh, 2015 (Fringe-nose worm eel)
- Neenchelys mccoskeri Hibino, H. C. Ho & Kimura, 2012 (McCosker's worm eel)
- Neenchelys microtretus Bamber, 1915 (Small-fin worm eel)
- Neenchelys nudiceps Tashiro, Hibino & Imamura, 2015 (Indonesian deep-sea worm eel)
- Neenchelys parvipectoralis Y. T. Chu, H. L. Wu & X. B. Jin, 1981 (Mini-fin worm eel)
- Neenchelys pelagica H. C. Ho, J. E. McCosker & D. G. Smith, 2015 (Pelagic worm eel)
- Neenchelys similis H. C. Ho, J. E. McCosker & D. G. Smith, 2015 (Slender worm eel).
