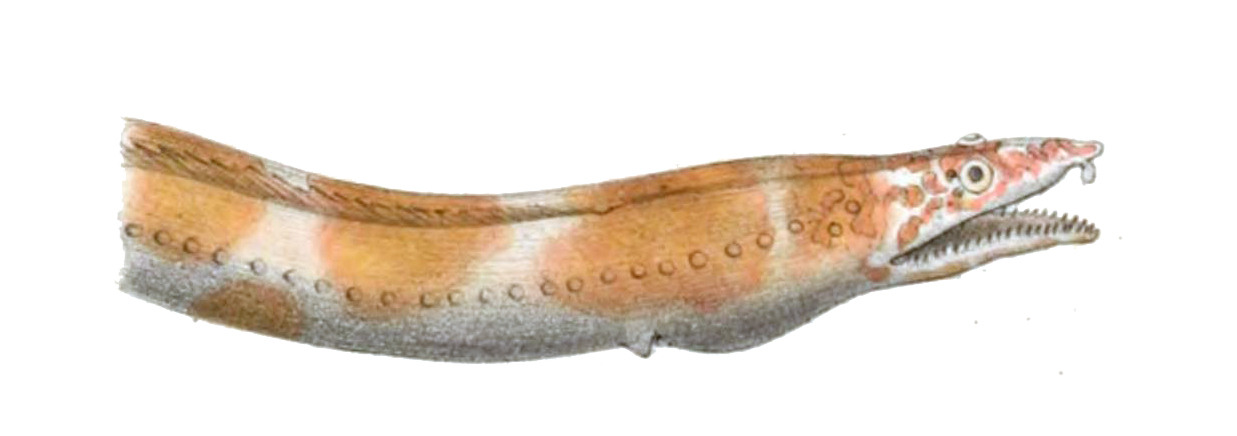

Conservation status
- Least Concern (IUCN 3.1)

Scientific classification
- Kingdom: Animalia
- Phylum: Chordata
- Class: Actinopterygii
- Order: Anguilliformes
- Family: Ophichthidae
- Genus: Quassiremus
- Species: Q. ascensionis

Binomial name
- Quassiremus ascensionis (Studer, 1889)

Synonyms
- Ophichthys ascensionis Studer, 1889; Quassiremus productus Seale, 1917; Quassiremus goslingi Beebe & Tee-Van, 1932

= Blackspotted snake eel =

Species of eel in the family Ophichthidae

The Blackspotted snake eel (Quassiremus ascensionis) is a species of eel in the family Ophichthidae. It was described by Théophile Rudolphe Studer in 1889. It is a rare tropical, marine eel which is known from the western and southern Atlantic Ocean, including Bermuda, the Bahamas, the Lesser Antilles, Brazil, and Ascension Island (from which its species epithet is derived). It is known to dwell at a depth of 12 meters, and inhabits sand and turtle grass; it forms burrows which leave its head exposed. Males can reach a maximum total length of 71 centimeters.
