= Allips =

Conservation status
- Data Deficient (IUCN 3.1)

Scientific classification
- Kingdom: Animalia
- Phylum: Chordata
- Class: Actinopterygii
- Order: Anguilliformes
- Family: Ophichthidae
- Genus: Allips; McCosker, 1972
- Species: A. concolor

Binomial name
- Allips concolor McCosker, 1972

Genus of fish

Allips concolor is a species of eel in the family Ophichthidae. The only member of its genus, it is found in the eastern Indian Ocean in shallow waters around Thailand and Australia.
