= Kertomichthys =

Conservation status
- Data Deficient (IUCN 3.1)

Scientific classification
- Kingdom: Animalia
- Phylum: Chordata
- Class: Actinopterygii
- Order: Anguilliformes
- Family: Ophichthidae
- Subfamily: Ophichthinae
- Genus: Kertomichthys; McCosker & J. E. Böhlke, 1982
- Species: K. blastorhinos

Binomial name
- Kertomichthys blastorhinos (Kanazawa, 1963)

Synonyms
- Mystriophis blastorhinos Kanazawa, 1963

Species of fish

Kertomichthys is a monospecific genus of marine ray-finned fish belonging to the family Ophichthidae, the snake eels. The only member of this genus is Kertomichthys blastorhinos, a species known only from its holotype which was collected in the Atlantic Ocean in the vicinity of French Guiana.
