= Taiwanese worm eel =

Scientific classification
- Kingdom: Animalia
- Phylum: Chordata
- Class: Actinopterygii
- Order: Anguilliformes
- Family: Ophichthidae
- Subfamily: Myrophinae
- Genus: Sympenchelys; Hibino, H. C. Ho & Kimura, 2015
- Species: S. taiwanensis

Binomial name
- Sympenchelys taiwanensis Hibino, H. C. Ho & Kimura, 2015

Species of fish

The Taiwanese worm eel (Sympenchelys taiwanensis) is a species of ophichthid fish found in Taiwan. This species is only known from northeastern and southwestern Taiwan. This species is the only member of the genus Sympenchelys.
