= Phaenomonas =

Scientific classification
- Kingdom: Animalia
- Phylum: Chordata
- Class: Actinopterygii
- Order: Anguilliformes
- Family: Ophichthidae
- Subfamily: Ophichthinae
- Genus: Phaenomonas; G. S. Myers & Wade, 1941

Type species
- Phaenomonas pinnata Myers & Wade, 1941

Species
- See text.

Genus of fishes

Phaenomonas is a genus of eels in the snake eel family Ophichthidae.

== Species ==
There are currently three recognized species in this genus:

- Phaenomonas cooperae G. Palmer, 1970 (Short-maned sand-eel)
- Phaenomonas longissima (Cadenat & Marchal, 1963) (Short-maned Sand-Eel)
- Phaenomonas pinnata G. S. Myers & Wade, 1941 (Elastic eel)
