= Lethogoleos =

Conservation status
- Least Concern (IUCN 3.1)

Scientific classification
- Kingdom: Animalia
- Phylum: Chordata
- Class: Actinopterygii
- Order: Anguilliformes
- Family: Ophichthidae
- Subfamily: Ophichthinae
- Genus: Lethogoleos; McCosker & J. E. Böhlke, 1982
- Species: L. andersoni

Binomial name
- Lethogoleos andersoni McCosker & J. E. Böhlke, 1982

Species of fish

Lethogoleos andersoni, or the forgetful snake-eel, is a species of eel in the family Ophichthidae. It is the only member of its genus. It is found only in the Atlantic Ocean off the coast of South Carolina.
