= Glenoglossa =

Scientific classification
- Domain: Eukaryota
- Kingdom: Animalia
- Phylum: Chordata
- Class: Actinopterygii
- Order: Anguilliformes
- Family: Ophichthidae
- Subfamily: Myrophinae
- Genus: Glenoglossa; McCosker, 1982
- Species: G. wassi

Binomial name
- Glenoglossa wassi McCosker, 1982

Species of fish

Glenoglossa wassi is a species of eel in the family Ophichthidae. It is the only member of its genus. It is found in the eastern Pacific Ocean in the vicinity of American Samoa.
