= Benthenchelys =

Scientific classification
- Domain: Eukaryota
- Kingdom: Animalia
- Phylum: Chordata
- Class: Actinopterygii
- Order: Anguilliformes
- Family: Ophichthidae
- Subfamily: Myrophinae
- Genus: Benthenchelys; Fowler, 1934

Species
- See text.

Genus of fishes

Benthenchelys is a genus of deep sea eels in the snake-eel family Ophichthidae, with these species:

- Benthenchelys cartieri Fowler, 1934
- Benthenchelys indicus Castle, 1972
- Benthenchelys pacificus Castle, 1972
