= Schismorhynchus =

Conservation status
- Least Concern (IUCN 3.1)

Scientific classification
- Kingdom: Animalia
- Phylum: Chordata
- Class: Actinopterygii
- Order: Anguilliformes
- Family: Ophichthidae
- Subfamily: Myrophinae
- Genus: Schismorhynchus; McCosker, 1970
- Species: S. labialis

Binomial name
- Schismorhynchus labialis (Seale, 1917)

Synonyms
- Muraenichthys labialis Seale, 1917

Species of fish

Schismorhynchus labialis, the grooved-jaw worm-eel, is a species of eel in the family Ophichthidae. It is the only member of its genus. It is known from the Indian and Pacific Oceans.
