= Skythrenchelys =

Scientific classification
- Kingdom: Animalia
- Phylum: Chordata
- Class: Actinopterygii
- Order: Anguilliformes
- Family: Ophichthidae
- Subfamily: Myrophinae
- Genus: Skythrenchelys; Castle & J. E. McCosker, 1999

Type species
- Skythrenchelys zabra Castle & McCosker, 1999

Genus of fishes

Skythrenchelys is a genus of eels in the snake eel family Ophichthidae.

== Species ==
There are currently 2 recognized species in this genus:

- Skythrenchelys macrostoma (Bleeker, 1864) (Large-mouth angry worm eel)
- Skythrenchelys zabra Castle & J. E. McCosker, 1999 (Angry worm eel)
