= Rhinophichthus =

Scientific classification
- Kingdom: Animalia
- Phylum: Chordata
- Class: Actinopterygii
- Order: Anguilliformes
- Family: Ophichthidae
- Subfamily: Ophichthinae
- Genus: Rhinophichthus; McCosker, 1999
- Species: R. penicillatus

Binomial name
- Rhinophichthus penicillatus McCosker, 1999

Species of fish

Rhinophichthus penicillatus is a species of eel in the family Ophichthidae. It is the only member of its genus. It is known only in the Pacific Ocean in the vicinity of New Caledonia.
