= Schultzidia =

Scientific classification
- Kingdom: Animalia
- Phylum: Chordata
- Class: Actinopterygii
- Order: Anguilliformes
- Family: Ophichthidae
- Subfamily: Myrophinae
- Genus: Schultzidia; Gosline, 1951

Type species
- Muraenichthys johnstonensis Schultz & Woods, 1949

Species
- See text.

Genus of fishes

Schultzidia is a genus of eels in the snake eel family Ophichthidae. The name of this genus honors American ichthyologist Leonard Peter Schultz (1901–1986), one of the describers of the type species, Muraenichthys johnstonensis. It currently contains the following species:

- Schultzidia johnstonensis (L. P. Schultz & Woods, 1949) (Johnston snake-eel)
- Schultzidia retropinnis (Fowler, 1934) (fringe-lipped worm-eel)
