= Gnathophis heterognathos =

Conservation status
- Least Concern (IUCN 3.1)

Scientific classification
- Kingdom: Animalia
- Phylum: Chordata
- Class: Actinopterygii
- Order: Anguilliformes
- Family: Congridae
- Genus: Gnathophis
- Species: G. heterognathos

Binomial name
- Gnathophis heterognathos (Bleeker, 1858)

Synonyms
- Myrophis heterognathos Bleeker, 1858

Species of fish

Gnathophis heterognathos is an eel in the family Congridae (conger/garden eels). It was described by Pieter Bleeker in 1858, originally under the genus Myrophis. It is a marine, temperate water-dwelling eel which is known from the western Pacific Ocean, including the southwestern Japanese archipelago, the Philippines, and the South China Sea. It dwells at a depth range of 183–199 metres (600–653 ft). Males can reach a maximum total length of 41.5 centimetres (16.3 in).
