= Luthulenchelys =

Conservation status
- Data Deficient (IUCN 3.1)

Scientific classification
- Kingdom: Animalia
- Phylum: Chordata
- Class: Actinopterygii
- Order: Anguilliformes
- Family: Ophichthidae
- Subfamily: Ophichthinae
- Genus: Luthulenchelys; McCosker, 2007
- Species: L. heemstraorum

Binomial name
- Luthulenchelys heemstraorum McCosker, 2007

Species of fish

Luthulenchelys heemstraorum is a species of eel in the family Ophichthidae. It is the only member of its genus. It is known only in the Indian Ocean in the vicinity of South Africa.
