= Hemerorhinus =

Scientific classification
- Domain: Eukaryota
- Kingdom: Animalia
- Phylum: Chordata
- Class: Actinopterygii
- Order: Anguilliformes
- Family: Ophichthidae
- Subfamily: Ophichthinae
- Genus: Hemerorhinus; M. C. W. Weber & de Beaufort, 1916

Type species
- Sphagebranchus heyningi M. C. W. Weber, 1913

Species
- See text.

Genus of fishes

Hemerorhinus is a genus of eels in the snake eel family Ophichthidae. It contains the following species:

- Hemerorhinus heyningi (M. C. W. Weber, 1913)
- Hemerorhinus opici Blache & Bauchot, 1972
