= Asarcenchelys =

Conservation status
- Data Deficient (IUCN 3.1)

Scientific classification
- Kingdom: Animalia
- Phylum: Chordata
- Class: Actinopterygii
- Order: Anguilliformes
- Family: Ophichthidae
- Subfamily: Myrophinae
- Genus: Asarcenchelys; McCosker, 1985
- Species: A. longimanus

Binomial name
- Asarcenchelys longimanus McCosker, 1985

Species of fish

Asarcenchelys longimanus is a species of eel in the family Ophichthidae. The only member of the genus Asarcenchelys, it is found in the southwestern Atlantic Ocean near Brazil. The common English name for this species is the emaciated worm eel. No threats are reported to affect the population of this species, and not enough information exists to determine whether or not A. longimanus is in danger of becoming an endangered species, and no conservation acts are taking place to conserve this species. A. longimanus lives in a marine environment within a tropical climate.
