= Eomyrus =

Eomyrus Temporal range: Middle Eocene (Bartonian)

Scientific classification
- Kingdom: Animalia
- Phylum: Chordata
- Class: Actinopterygii
- Order: Anguilliformes
- Family: Ophichthidae
- Genus: †Eomyrus; Storms, 1898
- Species: †E. dolloi

Binomial name
- †Eomyrus dolloi Storms, 1898

Extinct genus of fishes

Eomyrus ("dawn Myrus") is an extinct genus of prehistoric snake eel that lived during the middle Eocene. It contains a single species, E. dolloi from the Bartonian-aged Maldegem Formation (Wemmel Member) of Belgium.

The species E. latispinus (Agassiz, 1844) was reclassified into this genus, but has since been placed in Voltaconger.

== See also ==
- Prehistoric fish
- List of prehistoric bony fish
