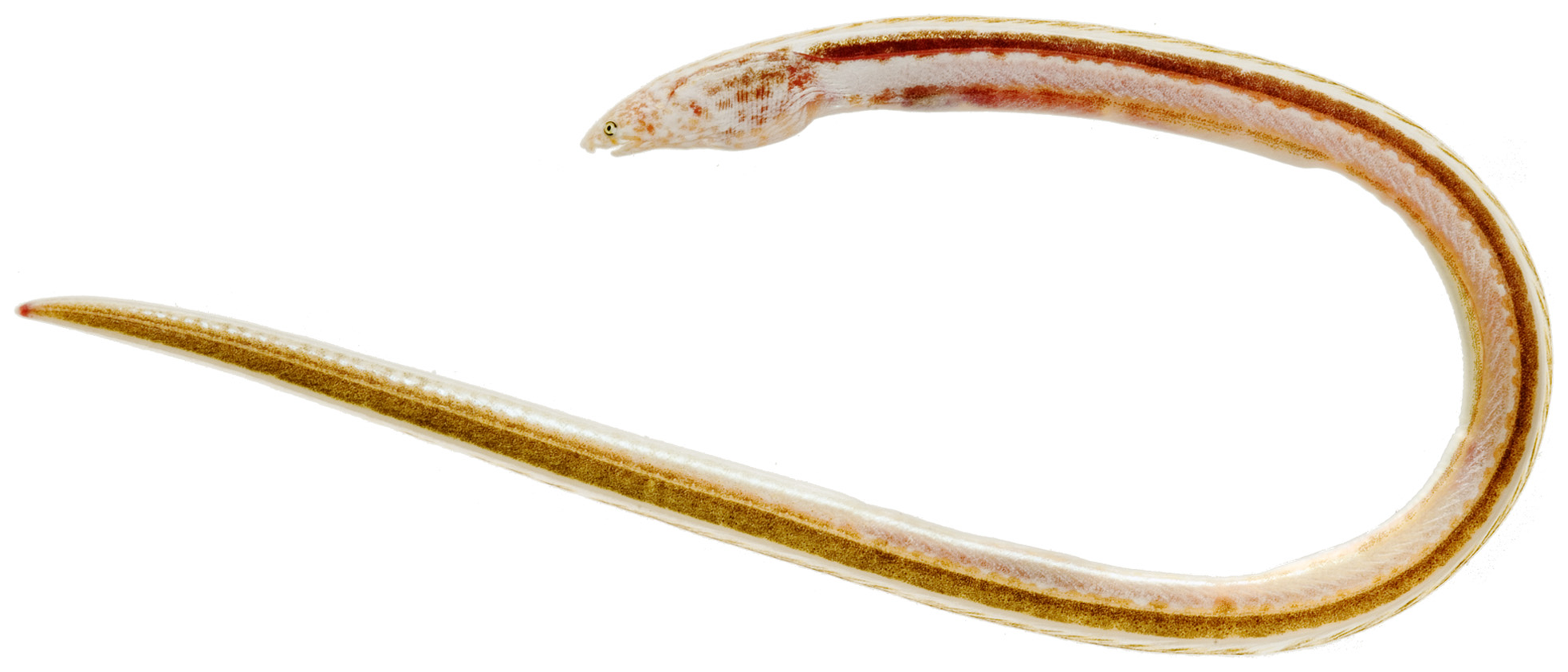

Conservation status
- Least Concern (IUCN 3.1)

Scientific classification
- Kingdom: Animalia
- Phylum: Chordata
- Class: Actinopterygii
- Order: Anguilliformes
- Family: Ophichthidae
- Subfamily: Ophichthinae
- Genus: Aprognathodon; J. E. Böhlke, 1967
- Species: A. platyventris

Binomial name
- Aprognathodon platyventris J. E. Böhlke, 1967

= Aprognathodon =

Species of fish

The stripe eel (Aprognathodon platyventris) is a species of eel in the family Ophichthidae. It is the only member of the genus Aprognathodon . It is found in the western Atlantic Ocean from the Florida Keys through the Caribbean islands to Venezuela in reef environments.
