= Hyphalophis =

Conservation status
- Data Deficient (IUCN 3.1)

Scientific classification
- Kingdom: Animalia
- Phylum: Chordata
- Class: Actinopterygii
- Order: Anguilliformes
- Family: Ophichthidae
- Subfamily: Ophichthinae
- Genus: Hyphalophis; McCosker & J. E. Böhlke, 1982
- Species: H. devius

Binomial name
- Hyphalophis devius McCosker & J. E. Böhlke, 1982

Species of fish

Hyphalophis is a monospecific genus of marine ray-finned fish belonging to the family Ophichthidae, the snake eels. The only member of this genus is Hyphalophis devius, a species known only from its holotype which was collected in the Lesser Antilles southwest of Grenada.
