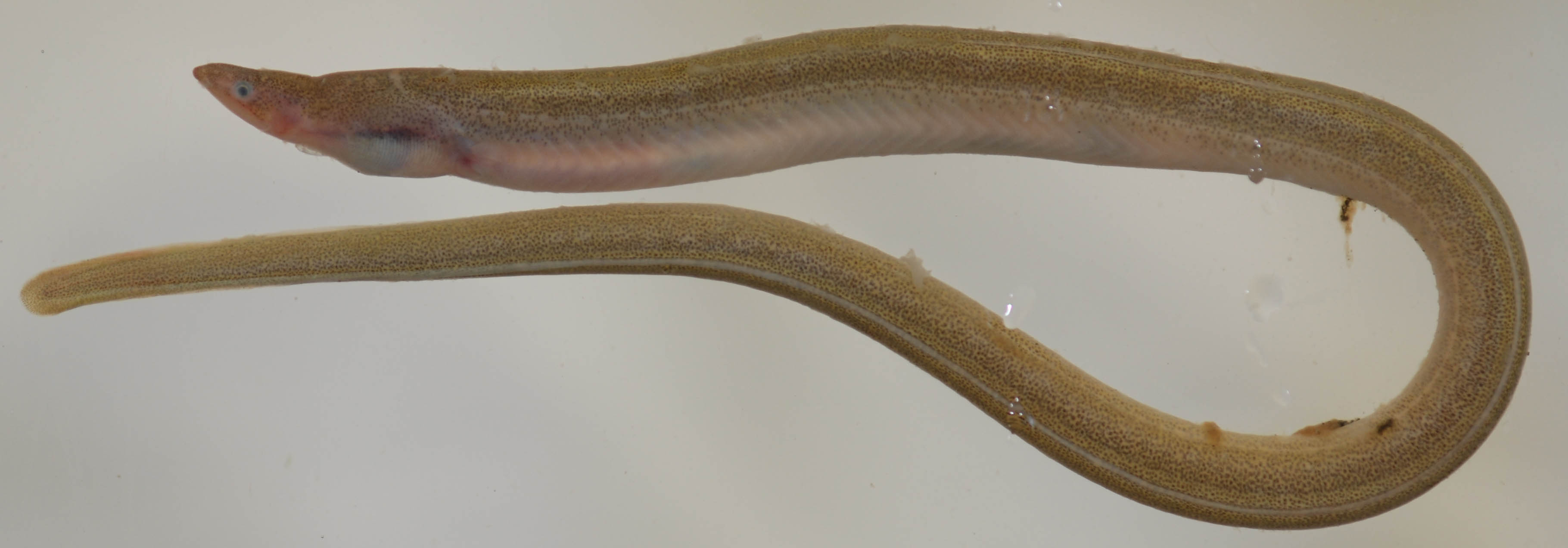
- Myrophis punctatus

Scientific classification
- Kingdom: Animalia
- Phylum: Chordata
- Class: Actinopterygii
- Order: Anguilliformes
- Family: Ophichthidae
- Subfamily: Myrophinae; Kaup, 1856

Genera
- See text

= Myrophinae =

Subfamily of ray-finned fish known as worm eels

Myrophinae, the worm eels, is a subfamily of ray-finned fishes belonging to the family Ophichthidae, which also includes the snake eels in the subfamily Ophichthinae.

== Taxonomy ==
Myrophinae was first proposed as a subfamily by the German naturalist Johann Jakob Kaup in 1856. It is one of two subfamilies, alongside the subfamily Ophichthinae in the family Ophichthidae, which is classified within the suborder Congroidei within the eel order Anguilliformes.

== Genera ==
The Myrophinae contains the following genera:

- Ahlia D. S. Jordan & Davis, 1891
- Asarcenchelys McCosker, 1985
- Benthenchelys Fowler, 1934
- Glenoglossa McCosker, 1982
- Mixomyrophis McCosker, 1985
- Muraenichthys Bleeker, 1853
- Myrophis Lütken, 1852
- Neenchelys Bamber, 1915
- Pseudomyrophis Wade, 1946
- Pylorobranchus McCosker & H.-M. Chen, 2012
- Schismorhynchus McCosker, 1970
- Schultzidia Gosline, 1951
- Scolecenchelys Ogilby, 1897
- Skythrenchelys Castle & McCosker, 1999
- Sympenchelys Hibino, H. C. Ho & Kimura, 2015

== Characteristics ==
Myrophinae, the worm eels, are characterised by having construicted gill openings which are located in the mid flank benhind the head. They have obvious caudal fin raysand these are joined to the anal and dorsal fins. The tip of the tail is flexible, a pectoral fins may be present or they may be absent. The colouration is uniform, although they are often darker on the back.
