= Malvoliophis =

Conservation status
- Least Concern (IUCN 3.1)

Scientific classification
- Kingdom: Animalia
- Phylum: Chordata
- Class: Actinopterygii
- Order: Anguilliformes
- Family: Ophichthidae
- Subfamily: Ophichthinae
- Genus: Malvoliophis; Whitley, 1934
- Species: M. pinguis

Binomial name
- Malvoliophis pinguis (Günther, 1872)

Synonyms
- Ophichthys pinguis Günther, 1872; Bascanichthys hemizona Ogilby, 1897

Species of fish

Malvoliophis pinguis, or the halfband snake-eel, is a species of eel in the family Ophichthidae. It is the only member of its genus. It is found in the western Pacific Ocean in the vicinity of Australia and Lord Howe Island.
