= Suculentophichthus =

Scientific classification
- Kingdom: Animalia
- Phylum: Chordata
- Class: Actinopterygii
- Order: Anguilliformes
- Family: Ophichthidae
- Subfamily: Ophichthinae
- Genus: Suculentophichthus; R. Fricke, Golani & Appelbaum-Golani, 2015
- Species: S. nasus

Binomial name
- Suculentophichthus nasus R. Fricke, Golani & Appelbaum-Golani, 2015

Species of fish

Suculentophichthus nasus also known as the Red Sea flappy snake eel is a species of ophichthid fish found in Israel. This species occurs Eilat in Gulf of Aqaba, Red Sea, Israel. This species is the only known member of the genus Suculentophichthus.
