= Ophichthus ophis =

Conservation status
- Least Concern (IUCN 3.1)

Scientific classification
- Kingdom: Animalia
- Phylum: Chordata
- Class: Actinopterygii
- Order: Anguilliformes
- Family: Ophichthidae
- Genus: Ophichthus
- Species: O. ophis

Binomial name
- Ophichthus ophis (Linnaeus, 1758)

Synonyms
- Anguilla serpens Shaw, 1803; Antobrantia ribeiroi Pinto, 1970; Herpetoichthys sulcatus Kaup, 1856; Herpetoichthys callisoma Abbott, 1860; Muraena hauannensis Bloch & Schneider, 1801; Muraena ophis Linnaeus, 1758; Ophichthys ophis (Linnaeus, 1758); Ophisurus havanensis (Bloch & Schneider, 1801); Ophisurus guttatus Cuvier, 1816; Uranichthys brachycephalus Poey, 1867; Uranichthys havanensis (Bloch & Schneider, 1801)

Species of fish

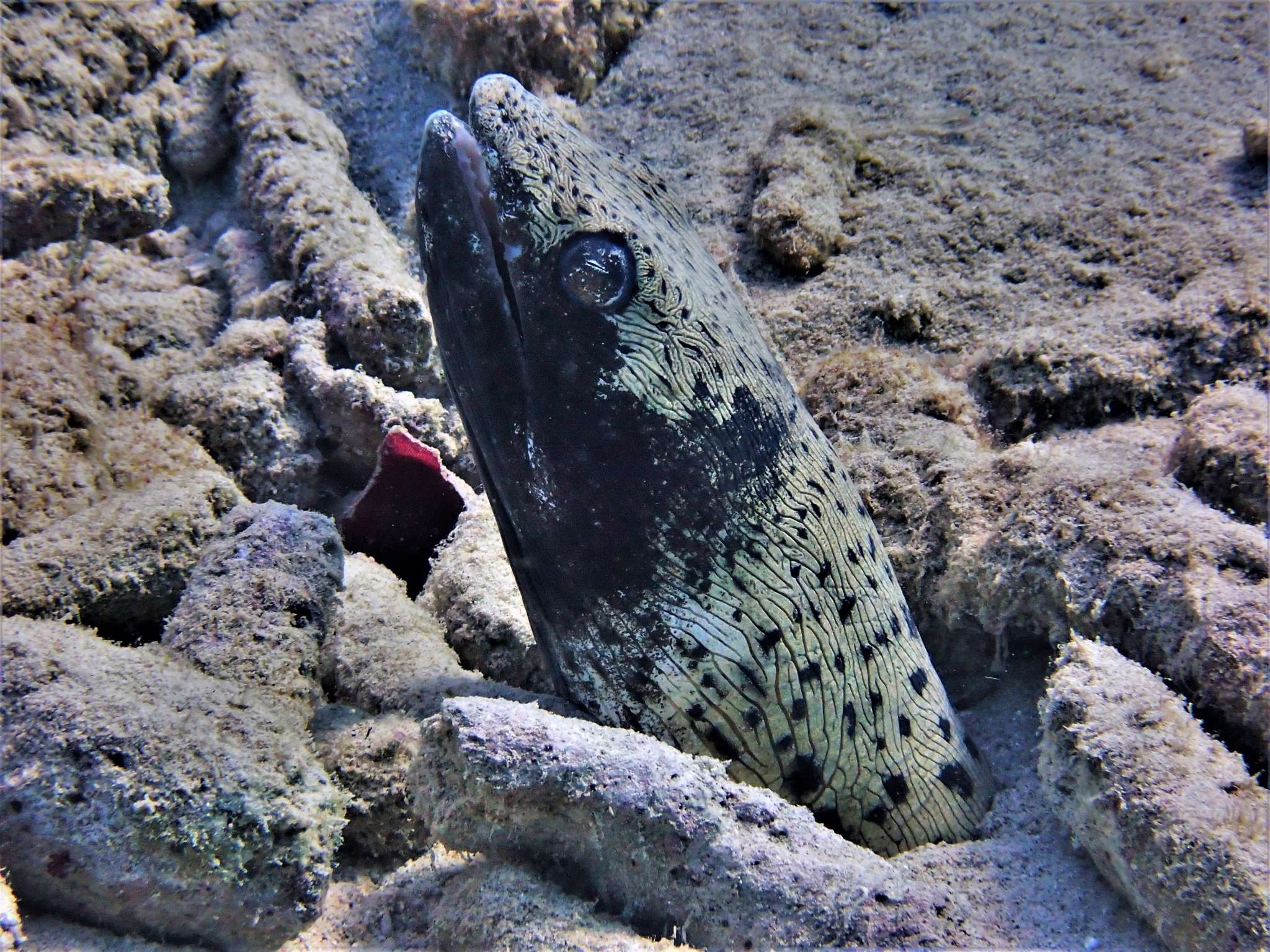

Ophichthus ophis, the spotted snake eel, is an eel in the family Ophichthidae (worm/snake eels). It was described by Carl Linnaeus in 1758, originally under the genus Muraena. It is a marine, subtropical eel which is known from the western and eastern Atlantic Ocean, including Bermuda and southern Florida, USA, Brazil, Lesser Antilles, Senegal, Angola, and the Mediterranean. It dwells at a depth range of 21 to 50 metres (69 to 164 ft), usually at around 50 m, and lives in burrows on a permanent basis. Males can reach a maximum total length of 210 centimeters (83 in), but more commonly reach a TL of 100 centimeters (39 in).

The Spotted snake eel hunts nocturnally, and feeds primarily on octopuses and finfish, including Haemulon aurolineatum. It is used as bait in subsistence fisheries, but is reported to cause ciguatera poisoning, and therefore is not usually used as a food source.
