= Benthenchelys cartieri =

Conservation status
- Least Concern (IUCN 3.1)

Scientific classification
- Kingdom: Animalia
- Phylum: Chordata
- Class: Actinopterygii
- Order: Anguilliformes
- Family: Ophichthidae
- Genus: Benthenchelys
- Species: B. cartieri

Binomial name
- Benthenchelys cartieri Fowler, 1934

Species of fish

Benthenchelys cartieri is an eel in the family Ophichthidae. It was described by Henry Weed Fowler in 1934. It is a tropical, marine eel known from the Philippines, in the western central Pacific Ocean. It is known to dwell at a maximum depth of 1,168 m (3,830 ft), and inhabits the pelagic zone.
