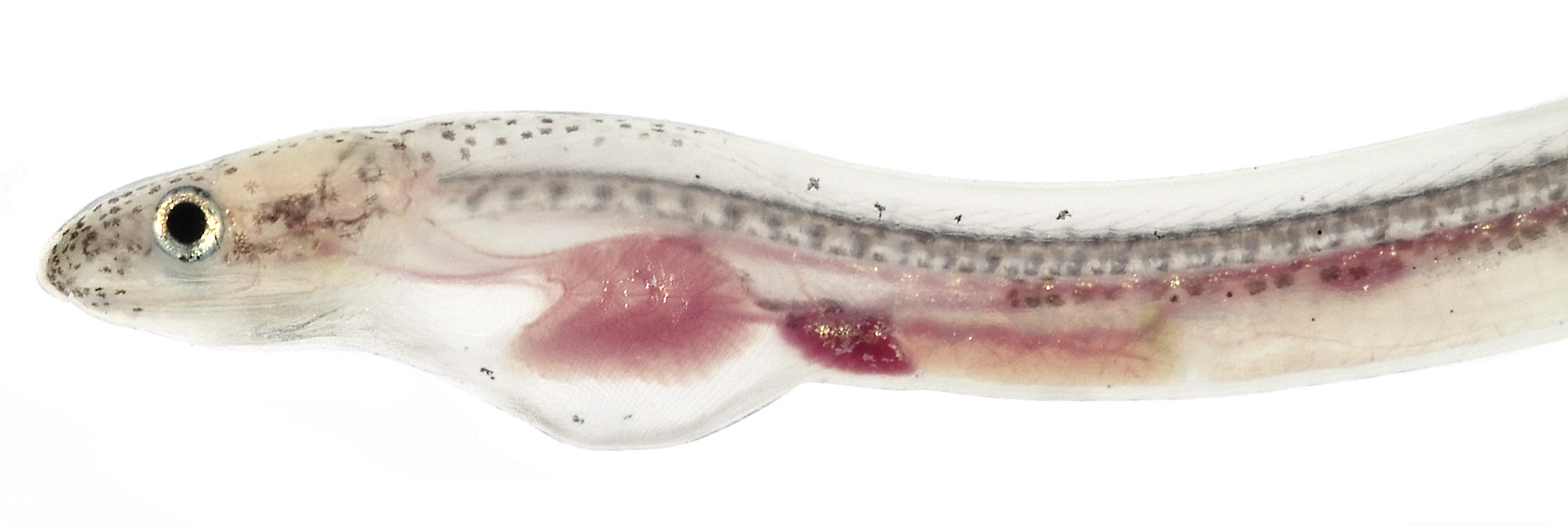
- The standard length of the larval worm eel is sixty-one millimeters.

Scientific classification
- Domain: Eukaryota
- Kingdom: Animalia
- Phylum: Chordata
- Class: Actinopterygii
- Order: Anguilliformes
- Family: Ophichthidae
- Subfamily: Myrophinae
- Genus: Myrophis; Lütken, 1852

Species
- See text.

= Myrophis =

Genus of fishes

Myrophis is a genus of eels in the snake eel family Ophichthidae.

== Species ==
There are currently seven recognized species in this genus:

- Myrophis anterodorsalis McCosker, E. B. Böhlke & J. E. Böhlke, 1989 (longfin worm eel)
- Myrophis lepturus Kotthaus, 1968
- Myrophis microchir (Bleeker, 1864) (ordinary snake eel)
- Myrophis platyrhynchus Breder, 1927 (Broadnose worm-eel)
- Myrophis plumbeus (Cope, 1871) (Leaden worm-eel)
- Myrophis punctatus Lütken, 1852 (Speckled worm-eel)
- Myrophis vafer D. S. Jordan & C. H. Gilbert, 1883 (Pacific worm-eel)

=== Former Species ===
- Myrophis heterognathos (Bleeker, 1858) - valid as Gnathophis heterognathos
