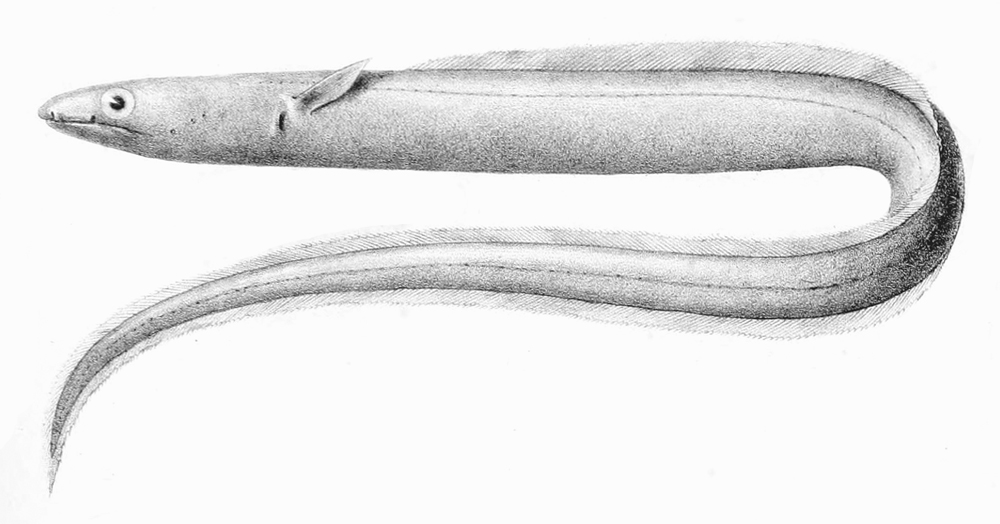
- Echelus pachyrhynchus

Scientific classification
- Kingdom: Animalia
- Phylum: Chordata
- Class: Actinopterygii
- Order: Anguilliformes
- Family: Ophichthidae
- Subfamily: Ophichthinae
- Genus: Echelus; Rafinesque, 1810

Type species
- Echelus punctatus Rafinesque, 1810

Synonyms
- Myrus Kaup, 1856

= Echelus =

Echelus Temporal range: Early Eocene–present

Genus of fishes

Echelus is a genus of eels in the snake-eel family Ophichthidae. Fossils belonging to this genus date back to the Early Eocene.

== Species ==
There are currently 4 recognized species in this genus:

- Echelus myrus (Linnaeus, 1758) (Painted eel)
- Echelus pachyrhynchus (Vaillant, 1888)
- Echelus polyspondylus J. E. McCosker & H. C. Ho, 2015 (Many-vertebrae snake eel)
- Echelus uropterus (Temminck & Schlegel, 1846) (Finned snake eel)

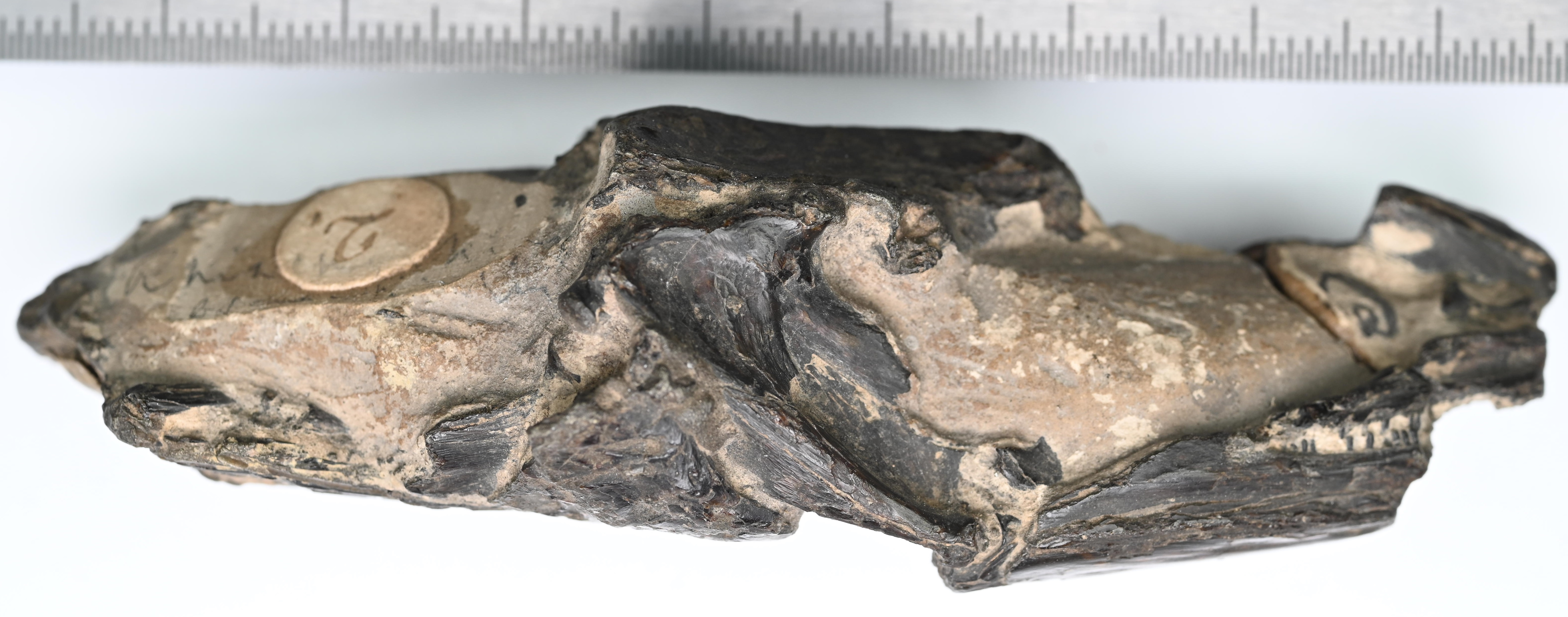
Fossil skull of Echelus branchialis

The following fossil species are also known:

- †Echelus arcuatus Radwanska, 1984 - Middle Miocene of Poland [otolith]
- †Echelus branchialis (Woodward, 1901) - Early Eocene of England
- †Echelus contractus Stinton, 1975 - Middle Eocene of England [otolith]
- †Echelus dolloi (Storms, 1896) - Middle Eocene of Belgium (=Eomyrus)
