= Bradley Moore Davis =

American botanist (1871–1957)

- c. 1918
- Born: November 19, 1871; Chicago, Illinois, US
- Died: March 13, 1957 (aged 85); Portland, Oregon, US
- Education: Leland Stanford Junior University; Harvard University
- Occupation: Botanist
- Spouse: Annie Elizabeth Paret (m. 1908)
- Children: 1

Bradley Moore Davis (November 19, 1871 – March 13, 1957) was an American botanist.

== Biography ==
At Harvard, c. 1893

Bradley Moore Davis was born in Chicago, Illinois on November 19, 1871. After graduating from Leland Stanford Junior University, in 1892, he studied at Harvard, Bonn, and Naples. For 11 years he taught at the University of Chicago, from 1902 to 1906 as assistant professor of plant morphology. He held a position at the Marine Biological Laboratory, Woods Hole, Massachusetts (1897–1905) and at the Bureau of Fisheries. In 1911 he became assistant professor of botany at the University of Pennsylvania, and he was secretary of the American Society of Naturalists in 1914. He was an elected member of both the American Philosophical Society and the American Academy of Arts and Sciences. Besides special articles on the morphology and cytology of algæ, fungi, and liverworts, and studies in the Œnothera, he was coauthor with J. Y. Bergen of Principles of Botany (1906) and Laboratory and Field Manual of Botany (1907).

He married Annie Elizabeth Paret on September 22, 1908, and they had one daughter.

Davis died from a heart attack at his home in Portland, Oregon on March 13, 1957.
