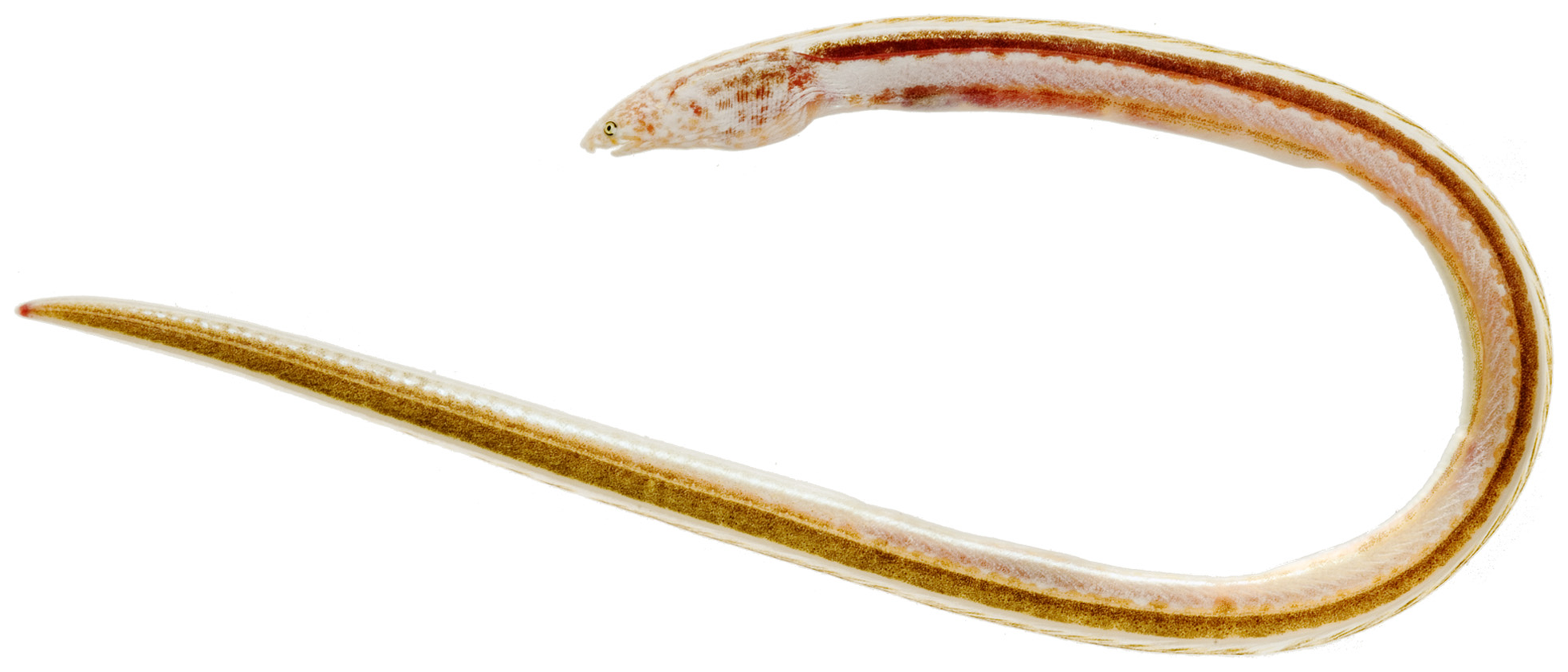
- Aprognathodon platyventris
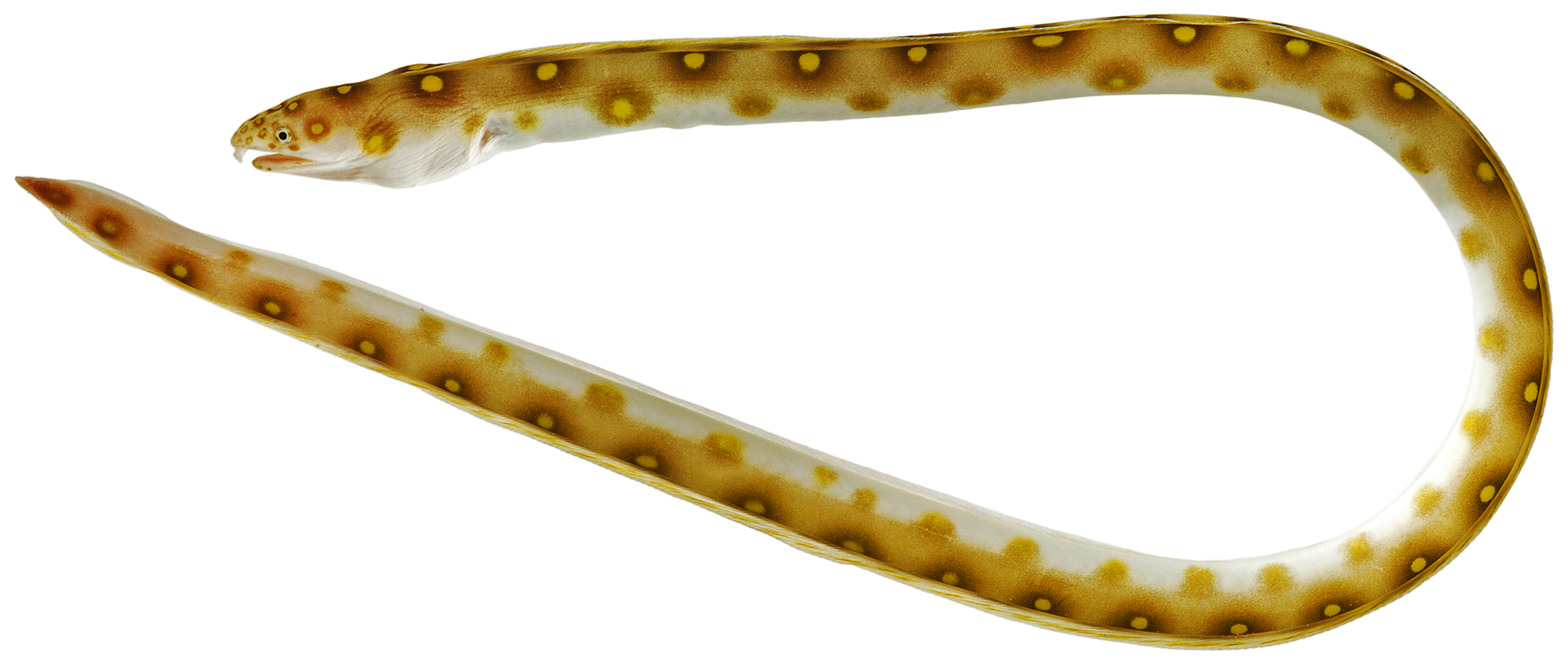
- Myrichthys ocellatus

Scientific classification
- Kingdom: Animalia
- Phylum: Chordata
- Class: Actinopterygii
- Division: Teleostei
- Order: Anguilliformes
- Suborder: Congroidei
- Family: Ophichthidae; Günther, 1870

Subfamilies
- Myrophinae Kaup, 1856; Ophichthinae Günther, 1870

= Ophichthidae =

Ophichthidae Temporal range: 56–0 Ma Early Eocene to Present

Family of fishes

Ophichthidae is a family of fish in the order Anguilliformes, commonly known as the snake eels. The term "Ophichthidae" comes from Greek ophis ("serpent") and ichthys ("fish"). Snake eels are also burrowing eels. They are named for their physical appearance, as they have long, cylindrical, snake-like bodies. This family is found worldwide in tropical to warm temperate waters. They inhabit a wide range of habitats, from coastal shallows and even rivers, to depths below 800 m (2,600 ft). Most species are bottom dwellers, hiding in mud or sand to capture their prey of crustaceans and small fish, but some are pelagic.

These species range in total length from 5 cm (2.0 in) to 2.3 m (7.5 ft) or more. Many species lack fins altogether, improving their ability to burrow into the substrate like worms. They are often spotted or striped in colour, mimicking the appearance of venomous sea snakes to deter predators. Often, they are washed ashore by large storms.

== Genera ==
Currently, 62 recognized genera are placed in this family:

- Subfamily Myrophinae Kaup, 1856
  - Ahlia D. S. Jordan & Davis, 1891
  - Asarcenchelys McCosker, 1985
  - Benthenchelys Fowler, 1934
  - Glenoglossa McCosker, 1982
  - Mixomyrophis McCosker, 1985
  - Muraenichthys Bleeker, 1853
  - Myrophis Lütken, 1852
  - Neenchelys Bamber, 1915
  - Pseudomyrophis Wade, 1946
  - Pylorobranchus McCosker & H.-M. Chen, 2012
  - Schismorhynchus McCosker, 1970
  - Schultzidia Gosline, 1951
  - Scolecenchelys Ogilby, 1897
  - Skythrenchelys Castle & McCosker, 1999
  - Sympenchelys Hibino, H. C. Ho & Kimura, 2015
- Subfamily Ophichthinae Günther, 1870
  - Allips McCosker, 1972
  - Aplatophis Böhlke, 1956
  - Aprognathodon Böhlke, 1967
  - Apterichtus A. M. C. Duméril, 1805
  - Bascanichthys D. S. Jordan & Davis, 1891
  - Brachysomophis Kaup, 1856
  - Caecula Vahl, 1794
  - Callechelys Kaup, 1856
  - Caralophia Böhlke, 1955
  - Chauligenion McCosker & Okamoto, 2016
  - Cirrhimuraena Kaup, 1856
  - Cirricaecula Schultz, 1953
  - Dalophis Rafinesque, 1810
  - Echelus Rafinesque, 1810
  - Echiophis Kaup, 1856
  - Ethadophis Rosenblatt & McCosker, 1970
  - Evips McCosker, 1972
  - Gordiichthys D. S. Jordan & Davis, 1891
  - Hemerorhinus Weber & de Beaufort, 1916
  - Herpetoichthys Kaup, 1856
  - Hyphalophis McCosker & Böhlke, 1982
  - Ichthyapus Brisout de Barneville, 1847
  - Kertomichthys McCosker & Böhlke, 1982
  - Lamnostoma Kaup, 1856
  - Leiuranus Bleeker, 1852
  - Leptenchelys Myers & Wade, 1941
  - Letharchus Goode & T. H. Bean, 1882
  - Lethogoleos McCosker & Böhlke, 1982
  - Leuropharus Rosenblatt & McCosker, 1970
  - Luthulenchelys McCosker, 2007
  - Malvoliophis Whitley, 1934
  - Myrichthys Girard, 1859
  - Mystriophis Kaup, 1856
  - Ophichthus Ahl, 1789
  - Ophisurus Lacépède, 1800
  - Paraletharchus McCosker, 1974
  - Phaenomonas Myers & Wade, 1941
  - Phyllophichthus Gosline, 1951
  - Pisodonophis Kaup, 1856
  - Quassiremus D. S. Jordan & Davis, 1891
  - Rhinophichthus McCosker, 1999
  - Scytalichthys Jordan & Davis, 1891
  - Stictorhinus Böhlke & McCosker, 1975
  - Suculentophichthus R. Fricke, Golani & Appelbaum-Golani, 2015
  - Xestochilus McCosker, 1998
  - Xyrias Jordan & Snyder, 1901
  - Yirrkala Whitley, 1940

=== Fossil genera ===
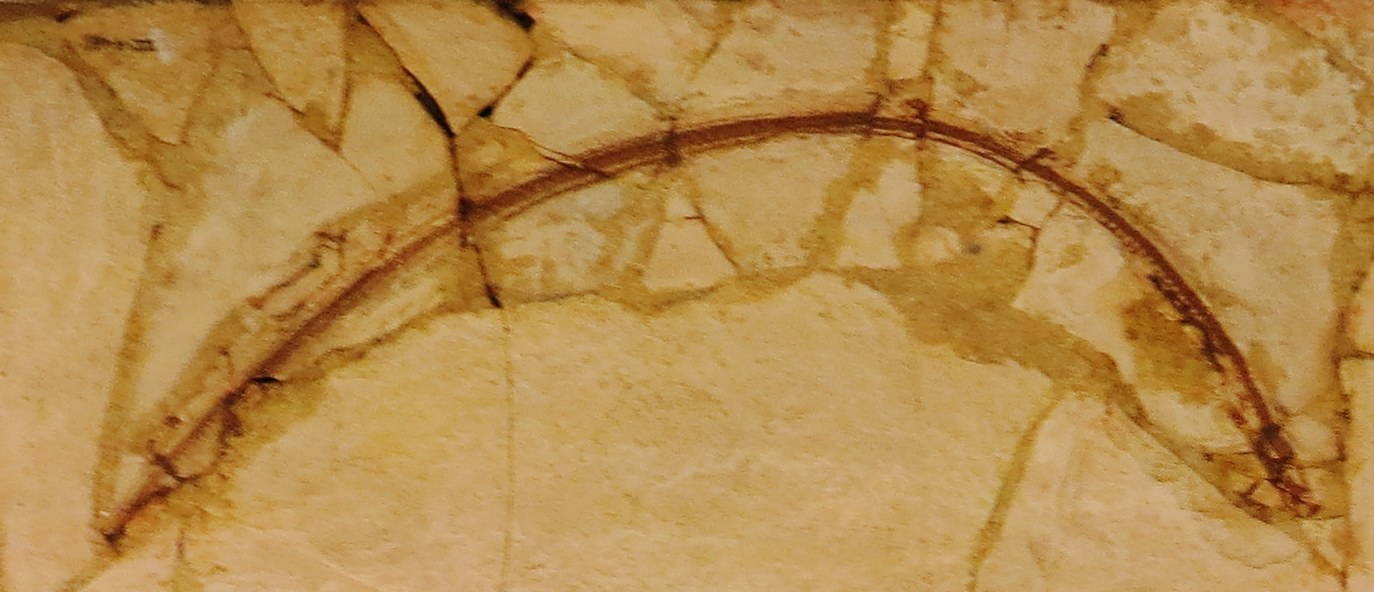
Fossil specimen of Goslinophis

The following fossil genera are also known:

- †Asanoa Sytchevskaya & Prokofiev, 2004 (earliest Eocene of Turkmenistan)
- †Eomyrus Storms, 1896 (middle Eocene of Belgium)
- †Goslinophis Blot, 1981 (early Eocene of Italy)
- †Micromyrus Casier, 1967 (early Eocene of Germany)
- †Palaeomyrus Casier, 1967 (early Eocene of Germany)
- †Parechelus Casier, 1967 (early Eocene of Germany, potentially late Eocene of Tonga). Potentially in own family Parechelidae
