= Clarion =

Clarion may refer to:

== Music ==
- Clarion (instrument), a type of trumpet used in the Middle Ages
- Clarion (accessible musical instrument), for disabled musicians
- Clarion (band), American rock band
- The register of a clarinet that ranges from B4 to C6
- A trumpet organ stop that usually plays an octave above unison pitch
- Clarion, a 2008 single by multinational band Guillemots

== Places ==
=== Mexico ===
- Clarion Island (Isla Clarión), Colima

=== United Kingdom ===
- Whitefield School, a school in London renamed Clarion School in 2025

=== United States ===
- Clarion, Illinois
- Clarion, Iowa
- Clarion, Michigan
- Clarion, Utah, a ghost town settled as a Jewish farming colony

==== Pennsylvania ====
- Clarion County, Pennsylvania
  - Clarion, Pennsylvania, a borough in and the county seat of Clarion County
  - Clarion Township, Clarion County, Pennsylvania
- Clarion River, Pennsylvania, a tributary of the Allegheny River
- Clarion University of Pennsylvania, a public university located in Clarion, Pennsylvania

== Publishing ==
- Peninsula Clarion, a regional newspaper published in Kenai, Alaska, U.S.
- Clarion Herald, the official newspaper of the Archdiocese of New Orleans in the U.S. state of Louisiana
- Clarion (magazine), a literary magazine published in Boston, Massachusetts, U.S.
- The Clarion-Ledger, a daily newspaper in the U.S. state of Mississippi, and the second oldest company in that state
- Clarion Workshop, a science fiction and fantasy workshop based in San Diego, California, U.S.
- Clarion West Writers Workshop, a science fiction and fantasy workshop based in Seattle, Washington, U.S.
- The Clarion (British newspaper), a defunct weekly socialist newspaper that was published in the United Kingdom
- Western Clarion, a defunct newspaper that served as the official organ of the Socialist Party of Canada from 1903 to 1925
- The Clarion, a defunct quarterly magazine published by the American Folk Art Museum from 1971 until 1992
- Clarion Books, a young adult publishing imprint of HarperCollins
- The Clarion (Canadian newspaper), the Canadian newspaper started by Carrie Best in 1946
- DU Clarion, newspaper of the University of Denver

== Computing ==
- CLARION (cognitive architecture)
- Clarion (programming language)
- CLARiiON, an EMC disk array

== Animals ==
- Clarion nightsnake (Hypsiglena unaocularis), a small colubrid snake
- Clarion snake eel (Myrichthys pantostigmius), a tropical, marine eel
- Clarión wren (Troglodytes tanneri), a species of bird
- Proud Clarion, an American Thoroughbred racehorse, winner of the 1967 Kentucky Derby
- Clarion angelfish (Holacanthus clarionensis), a species of saltwater angelfish

== Companies and organizations ==
- Clarion (company), a Japanese automotive and consumer electronics manufacturer
- Clarion Project, a nonprofit organization based in Washington D.C., USA
- Clarion Hotel, a hotel brand in the United States
- Clarion Hotel Limerick, a hotel in Limerick, Ireland
- Clarion Housing Group, a British housing association
- National Clarion Cycling Club, a cycling club with some 29 member sections in the United Kingdom

== Ufology ==
- Clarion, a purported extraterrestrial planet from which, according to American contactee Truman Bethurum, a humanoid civilization with tanned skin originates

== Other uses ==
- Clarion Award, an honor for excellence in communications from the Association for Women in Communications
- Clarion (heraldry), a charge or bearing in heraldry
- Operation Clarion, an extensive Allied campaign of strategic bombing during World War II against Nazi Germany

== See also ==
- Clarin (disambiguation)
- Klarion the Witch Boy
