= Spotted snake eel =

There are two species of eel named spotted snake eel:

- Myrichthys maculosus
- Myrichthys tigrinus
