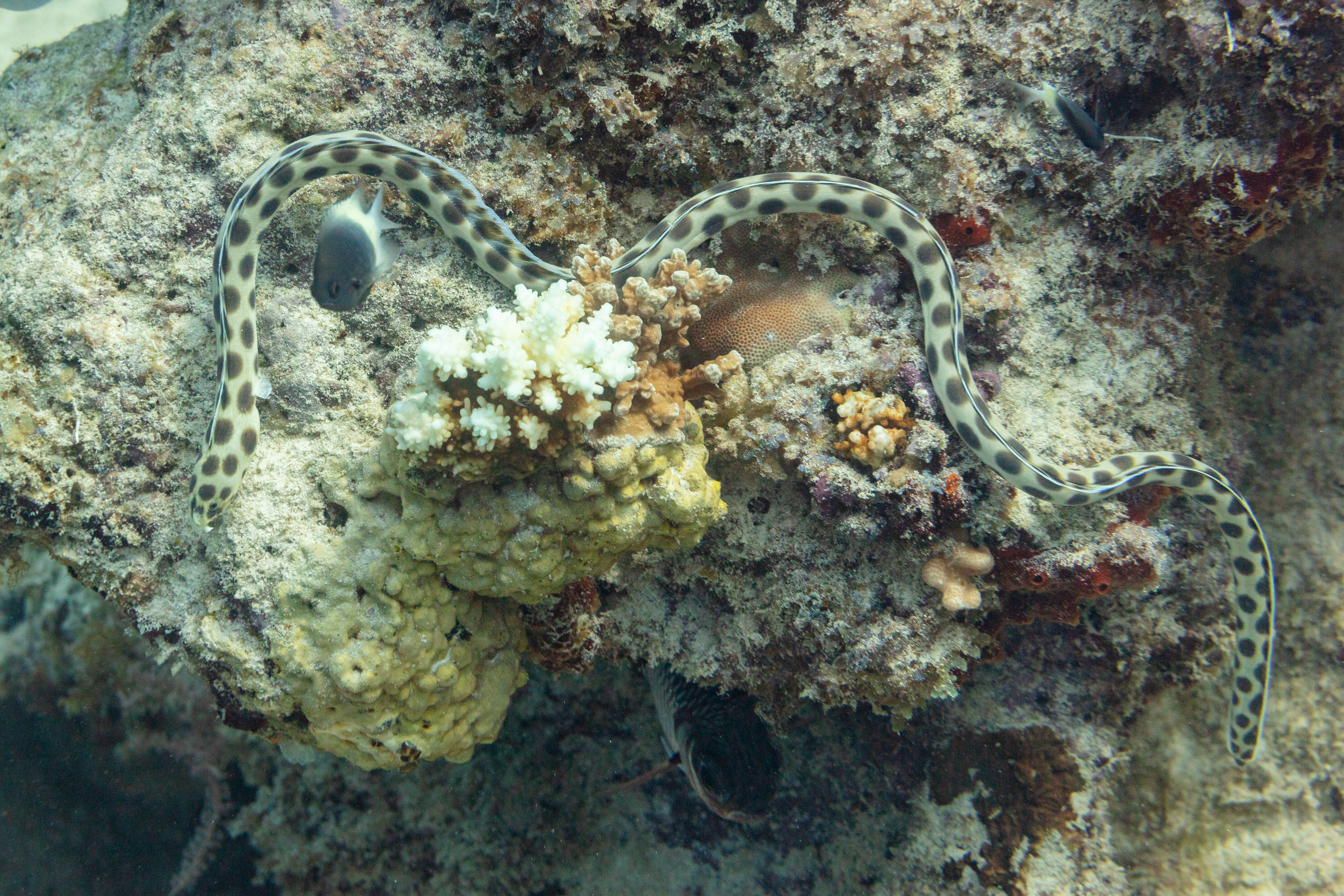

Conservation status
- Least Concern (IUCN 3.1)

Scientific classification
- Kingdom: Animalia
- Phylum: Chordata
- Class: Actinopterygii
- Order: Anguilliformes
- Family: Ophichthidae
- Genus: Myrichthys
- Species: M. maculosus

Binomial name
- Myrichthys maculosus (Cuvier, 1816)

= Myrichthys maculosus =

Species of fish

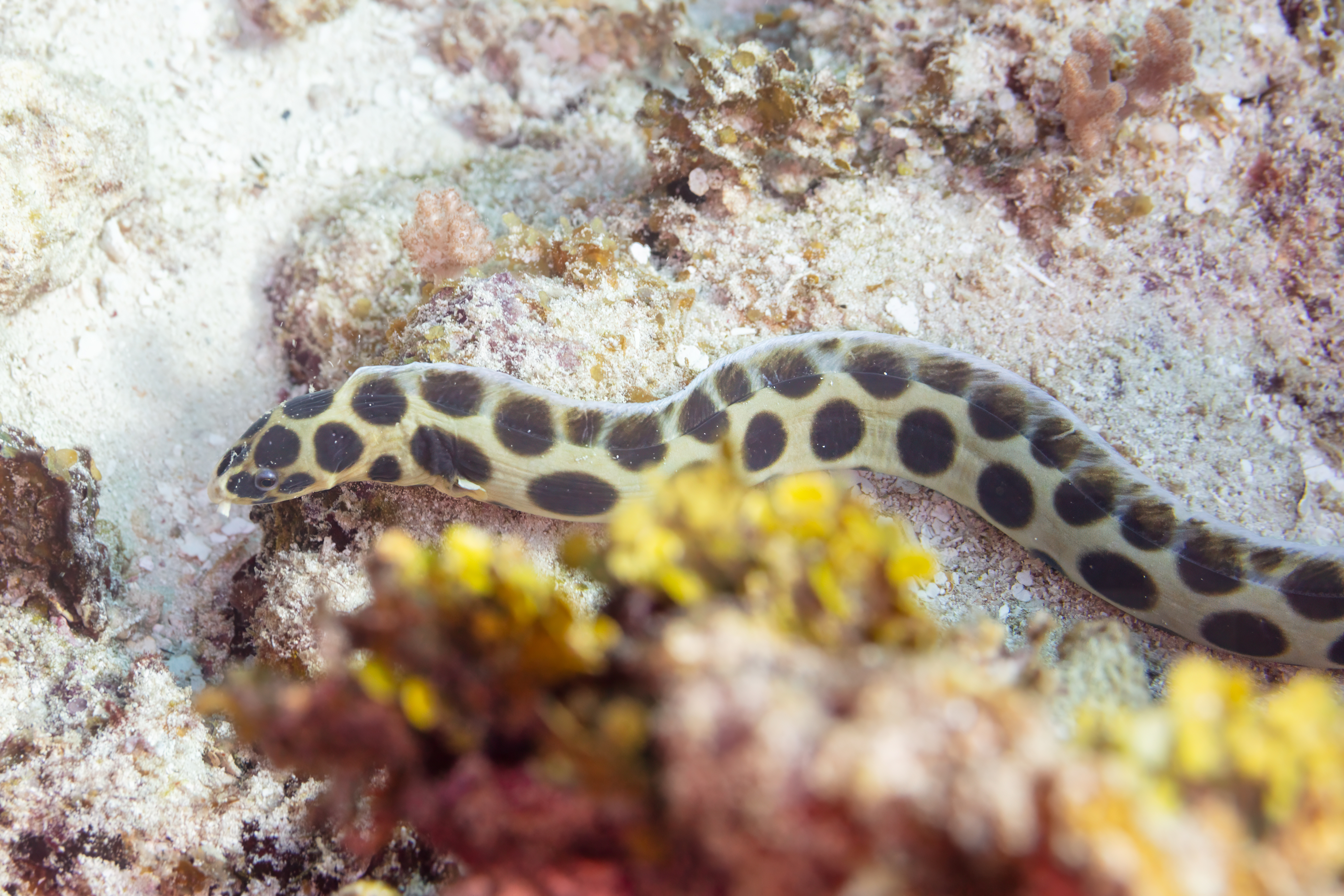
Detail of the head

Myrichthys maculosus, commonly known as the tiger snake eel, the ocellate snake eel or the spotted snake eel, is a species of fish in the family Ophichthidae, native to the Indo-Pacific. It is occasionally encountered in the aquarium trade. It grows to a length of 1 m (40 in).

== Description ==
An elongated, snake-like fish, Myrichthys maculosus can grow to a length of 1 m (40 in), but a more common size is 50 cm (20 in). The head is small with a short snout and long tubular nostrils pointing downwards. There are two rows of teeth on each jaw and two more rows on the palate. The dorsal fin has its origin just behind the head while the anal fin starts midway along the body; both run to near the tip of the tail. There are no pelvic or caudal fins, and the pectoral fins are small. This fish is cream or yellow, with large, brown or black, circular or oval spots. Young fish have a single longitudinal row of spots while large individuals have three rows.

== Distribution and habitat ==
M. maculosus is found in the tropical and warm temperate Indo-Pacific region. Its range extends from East Africa and the Red Sea to French Polynesia and the Galápagos Islands, and from Japan to eastern Australia. It is not present in Hawaii, where it is replaced by the magnificent snake eel (Myrichthys magnificus). It inhabits lagoons, reef flats, seagrass beds and sandy plains, at depths down to about 260 m (850 ft).

== Ecology ==
This species is mainly nocturnal but can sometimes be seen during the daytime swimming over sandy or vegetated areas. It generally spends the daytime buried in sand, digging itself in tail first. It has a well-developed sense of smell which it uses to locate its prey, which include crustaceans, banded snake eels and other small fish, while they are buried in the sediment. At night, it sometimes aggregates in large numbers at locations where there is artificial lighting. Little is known about the reproduction of this species; the sexes are separate and the larvae are leaf-shaped and known as leptocephali.
