= Pisodonophis hijala =

Scientific classification
- Kingdom: Animalia
- Phylum: Chordata
- Class: Actinopterygii
- Order: Anguilliformes
- Family: Ophichthidae
- Genus: Pisodonophis
- Species: P. hijala

Binomial name
- Pisodonophis hijala (Hamilton, 1822)

Synonyms
- Ophisurus hijala Hamilton, 1822

Species of fish

Pisodonophis hijala is an eel in the family Ophichthidae (worm/snake eels). It was described by Francis Buchanan-Hamilton in 1822, originally under the genus Ophisurus. It is a marine, tropical eel which is known from the Indo-Pacific.
