= Hoeven's snake eel =

Scientific classification
- Domain: Eukaryota
- Kingdom: Animalia
- Phylum: Chordata
- Class: Actinopterygii
- Order: Anguilliformes
- Family: Ophichthidae
- Genus: Pisodonophis
- Species: P. hoeveni

Binomial name
- Pisodonophis hoeveni (Bleeker, 1853)

Synonyms
- Ophisurus hoevenii Bleeker, 1853; Pisodonophis hoevenii (Bleeker, 1853)

Species of fish

Hoeven's snake eel (Pisodonophis hoeveni) is an eel in the family Ophichthidae (worm/snake eels). It was described by Pieter Bleeker in 1853, originally under the genus Ophisurus. It is a marine, tropical eel which is known from three specimens found in the Indo-Western Pacific, including Sulawesi, Indonesia, the Persian Gulf and the Gulf of Oman. It is known to inhabit shallow water and lagoons. Males are known to reach a total length of 22 centimetres (8.7 in).
