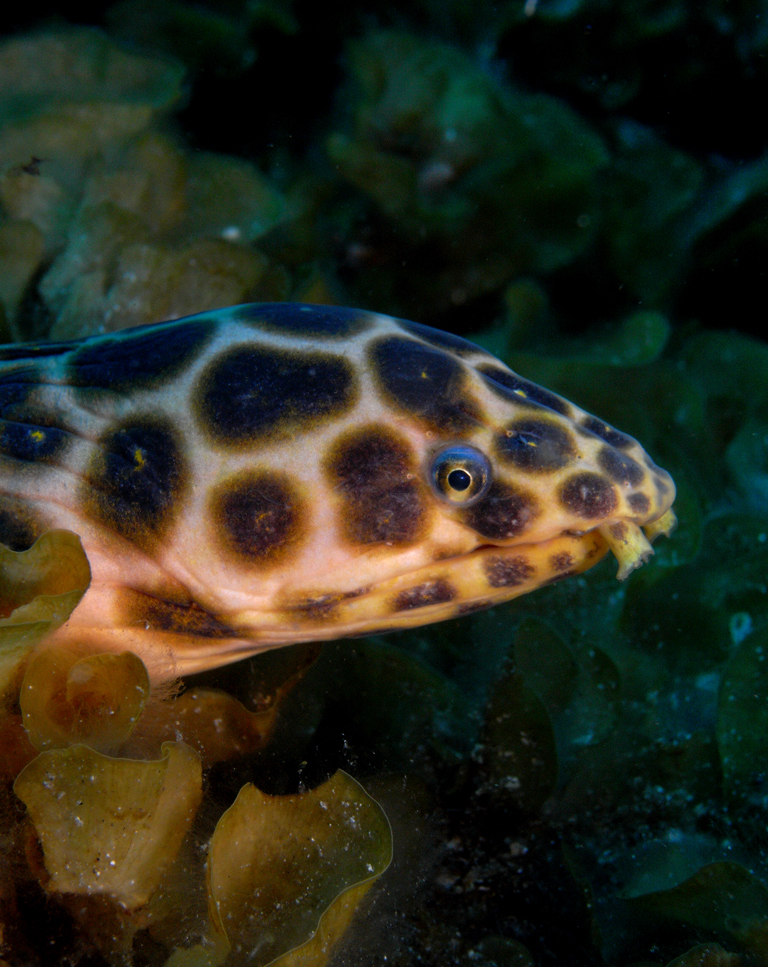

Conservation status
- Least Concern (IUCN 3.1)

Scientific classification
- Kingdom: Animalia
- Phylum: Chordata
- Class: Actinopterygii
- Order: Anguilliformes
- Family: Ophichthidae
- Genus: Myrichthys
- Species: M. pardialis

Binomial name
- Myrichthys pardialis (Valenciennes, 1839)

Synonyms
- Ophisurus pardalis Valenciennes, 1839; Ophichthys pardalis (Valenciennes, 1839); Myrichthys perdalis (Valenciennes, 1839)

= Leopard eel =

Species of fish

The leopard eel (Myrichthys pardalis) is an eel in the worm or snake eels family, Ophichthidae. It was described by Achille Valenciennes in 1839, originally under the genus Ophisurus.

Male leopard eels can reach a maximum total length of 64.8 cm (25.5 in). It is of minor commercial interest to fisheries.

It is a marine, tropical eel, which is known from the eastern Atlantic Ocean, including the Canary Islands, Annobón Island, Equatorial Guinea, and São Tomé Island. It forms burrows in coarse sand sediments on rocky island coasts. The species is also found in the western Atlantic Ocean.

The leopard eel's diet consists of benthic invertebrates.
