= Ophichthus retrodorsalis =

Scientific classification
- Domain: Eukaryota
- Kingdom: Animalia
- Phylum: Chordata
- Class: Actinopterygii
- Order: Anguilliformes
- Family: Ophichthidae
- Genus: Ophichthus
- Species: O. retrodorsalis

Binomial name
- Ophichthus retrodorsalis D. Liu, W. Q. Tang & C. G. Zhang, 2010

Species of eel

Ophichthus retrodorsalis is an eel in the family Ophichthidae (worm/snake eels). It is found along the Pacific coast of China.

The species has been moved to the genus Pisodonophis and future studies may prove that this species is synonymous to Pisodonophis boro.
