= Pisodonophis hypselopterus =

Conservation status
- Data Deficient (IUCN 3.1)

Scientific classification
- Kingdom: Animalia
- Phylum: Chordata
- Class: Actinopterygii
- Order: Anguilliformes
- Family: Ophichthidae
- Genus: Pisodonophis
- Species: P. hypselopterus

Binomial name
- Pisodonophis hypselopterus (Bleeker, 1851)

Synonyms
- Ophiurus hypselopterus Bleeker, 1851; Ophisurus hypselopterus Bleeker, 1851; Pisoodonophis hypselopterus (Bleeker, 1851)

Species of fish

Pisodonophis hypselopterus is an eel in the family Ophichthidae (worm/snake eels). It was described by Pieter Bleeker in 1851, originally under the genus Ophisurus. It is a tropical, freshwater and brackish water-dwelling eel which is known from Borneo, Indonesia, and Pohnpei in Asia. Males can reach a maximum total length of 75 centimetres (30 in).

Due to a lack of information on its ecology and habitat, the IUCN redlist currently lists P. hypselopterus as Data Deficient. It notes, however, that its habitat is under threat due to degradation of neighbouring forests.
