= Myrichthys paleracio =

Conservation status
- Data Deficient (IUCN 3.1)

Scientific classification
- Kingdom: Animalia
- Phylum: Chordata
- Class: Actinopterygii
- Order: Anguilliformes
- Family: Ophichthidae
- Genus: Myrichthys
- Species: M. paleracio

Binomial name
- Myrichthys paleracio McCosker & Allen, 2012

Species of fish

Myrichthys paleracio, the whitenose snake eel, is a species of Myrichthys that was discovered in 2012 in the Philippines.
