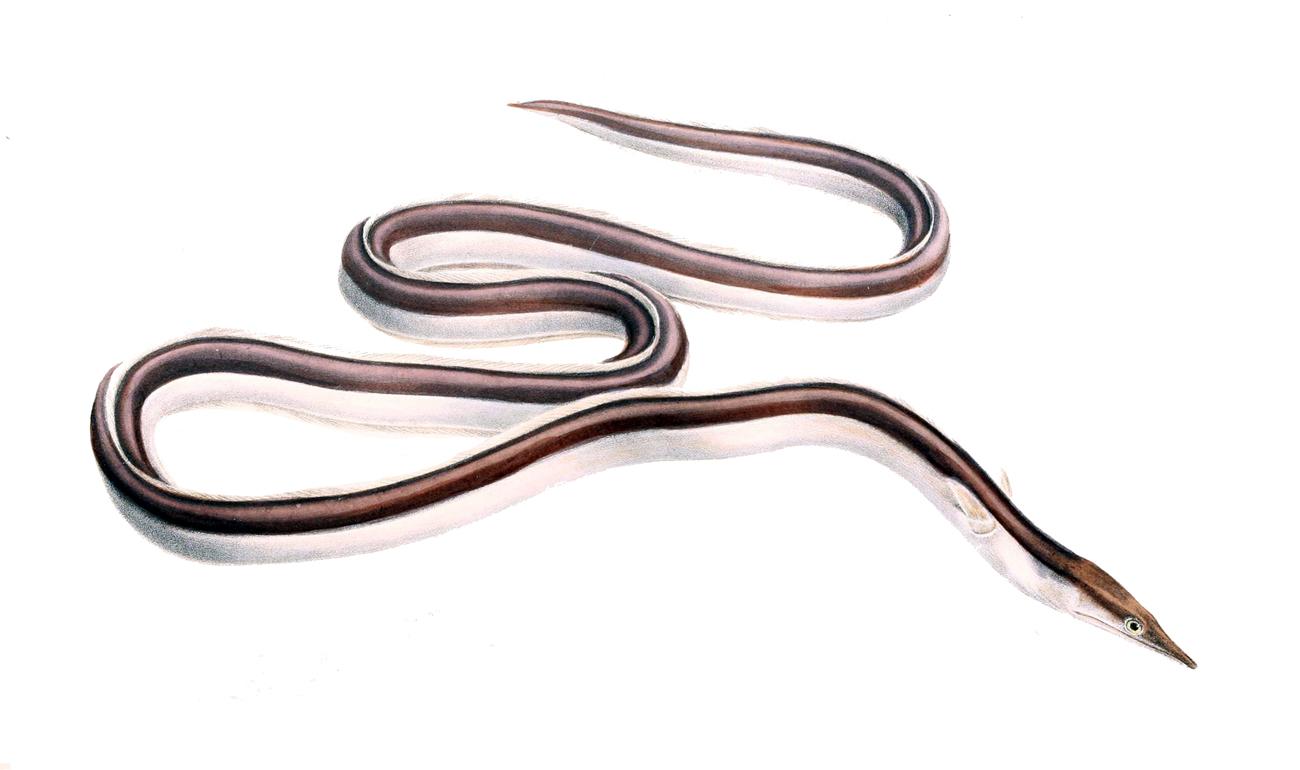

Conservation status
- Least Concern (IUCN 3.1)

Scientific classification
- Kingdom: Animalia
- Phylum: Chordata
- Class: Actinopterygii
- Order: Anguilliformes
- Family: Ophichthidae
- Genus: Ophisurus
- Species: O. serpens

Binomial name
- Ophisurus serpens (Linnaeus, 1758)

Synonyms
- Echelus oxyrinchus Rafinesque, 1810; Leptorhynchus capensis Smith, 1840; Muraena acutirostris Gronow, 1854; Muraena serpens Linnaeus, 1758; Oxystomus serpens (Linnaeus, 1758); Sphagebranchus serpens (Linnaeus, 1758)

= Serpent eel =

Species of eel

The serpent eel or sand snake-eel (Ophisurus serpens) is an eel found in the eastern Atlantic Ocean, western Mediterranean Sea, western Indian Ocean, western Pacific Ocean and the north-east and west coast of North Island in New Zealand. It is an elongated, slender fish with a length of up to 250 centimetres. It spends the day with its body immersed in the sediment, emerging into the open water at night.

== Description ==
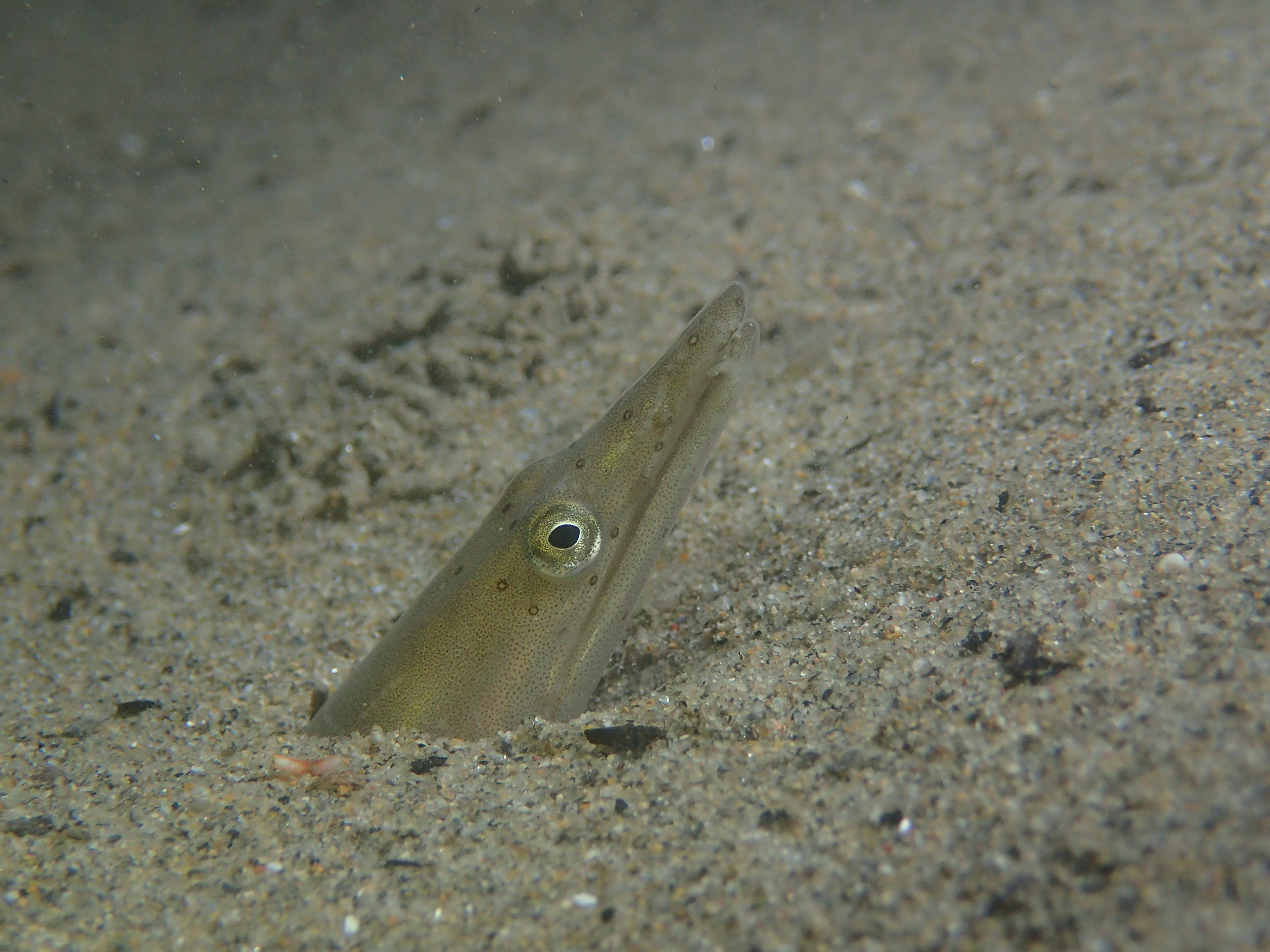
Photograph of a serpent eel

The serpent eel is an elongated slender fish, attaining a length of up to 250 cm (100 in), with a maximum diameter of 5 cm (2 in), although 100 cm (40 in) is a more common total length. The long, tapering snout has the upper jaw longer than the lower jaw. The teeth are sharply pointed and are normally visible; the front nostril is halfway between the tip of the snout and the eye, and the hind nostril is protected by a valve and concealed in a groove closer to the eye. The gape extends as far back as the eye, which has an almond-shaped pupil during the day and a circular pupil at night. The branchial opening is small, and is positioned just in front of the short pectoral fins. Both the dorsal fin and the anal fin are long and low, starting well behind the pectoral fins; there are no pelvic fins or tail fin, and the lateral line is clearly demarcated. The general colour is pale brownish-green, with dark punctuations on the snout and often with silvery reflections on the flanks; the belly is pale. Juvenile fish have a less elongated snout, and are a silvery colour.

== Distribution and habitat ==
The serpent eel is found in the eastern Atlantic Ocean, where its range extends from Senegal to Portugal, and the Mediterranean Sea. It has also been recorded from other parts of the African coast and the Indian Ocean, as well as from Australia and New Zealand; this disjunct distribution may indicate that two similar species, looking much alike, are involved. It inhabits soft muddy and sandy sediments, mostly on the continental shelf, at depths down to about 300 m (1,000 ft).

== Biology ==
This fish is nocturnal, spending the day immersed in the sediment with just its head projecting. To bury itself, it wriggles its body and works its way into the sediment tail first. It shows marked fidelity to its burrow, having been observed using the same location for more than a month. It is seldom seen by day because of its secretive habits and cryptic colouration. At night it emerges to feed, the diet probably consisting of fish of a suitable size, and crustaceans.
