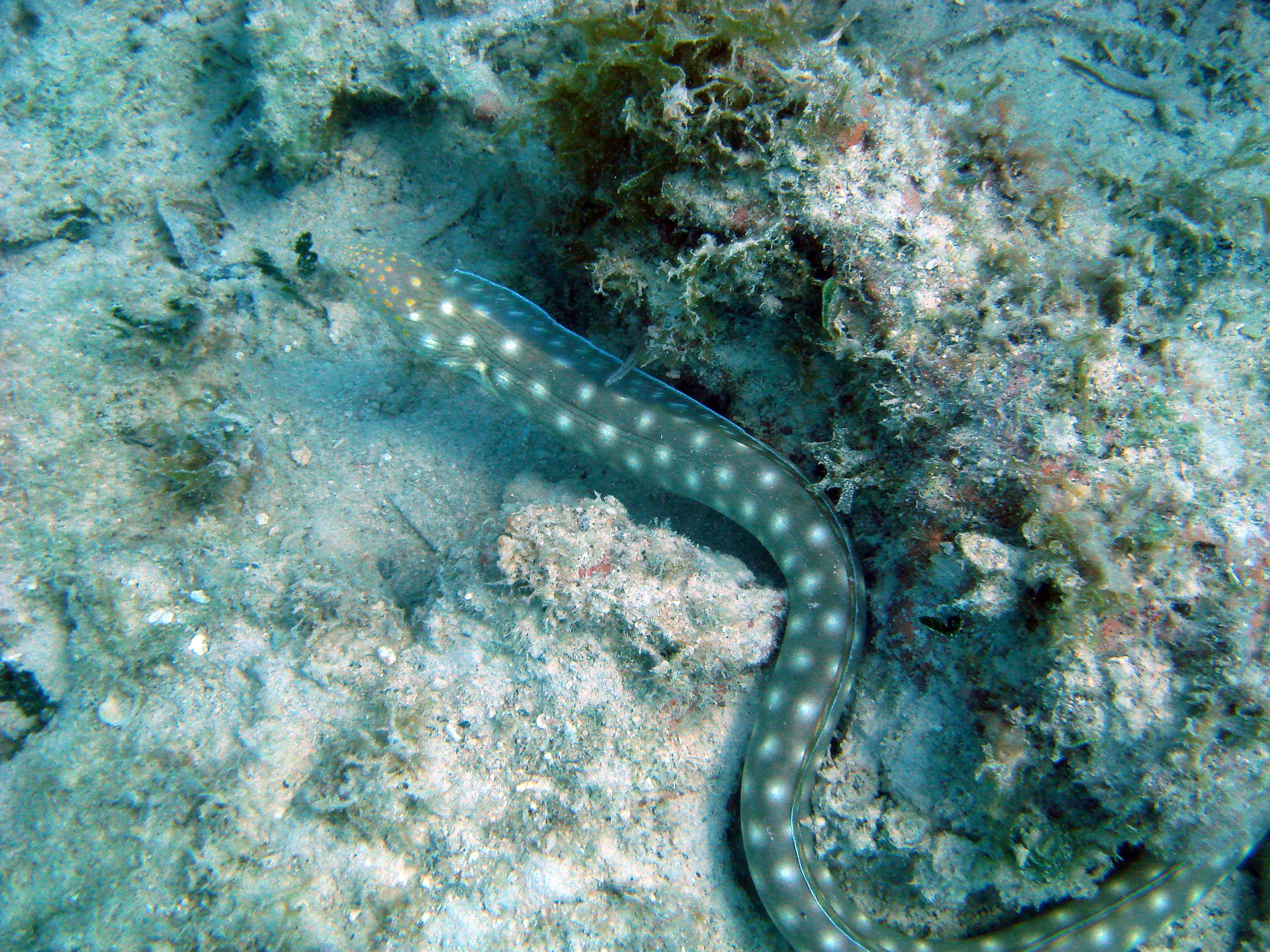

Conservation status
- Least Concern (IUCN 3.1)

Scientific classification
- Kingdom: Animalia
- Phylum: Chordata
- Class: Actinopterygii
- Order: Anguilliformes
- Family: Ophichthidae
- Genus: Myrichthys
- Species: M. breviceps

Binomial name
- Myrichthys breviceps (J. Richardson, 1848)

Synonyms
- Ophisurus breviceps Richardson, 1848; Muraena acuminata Gronow, 1854; Myrichthys acuminatus (Gronow, 1854); Pisodonophis guttulatus Kaup, 1856; Ophisurus longus Poey, 1867; Ophichthys pisavarius Poey, 1876; Leptocephalus undulatus Strömman, 1896

= Myrichthys breviceps =

Species of fish

Myrichthys breviceps, the sharptail snake-eel, is a fish species native to the Western Atlantic.

It has diffuse, yellow spots on a blueish-gray back and white belly. Spots are small on the head, and larger on the body. The eel can be found along the coasts of the Caribbean sea, mainly on sea grass beds, reefs, and in clear waters. Despite being nocturnal, they can also be seen foraging during daylight. Their food source is small invertebrates like crabs.

They allow close approach by divers and can easily be photographed, but buried in the sand when bothered.

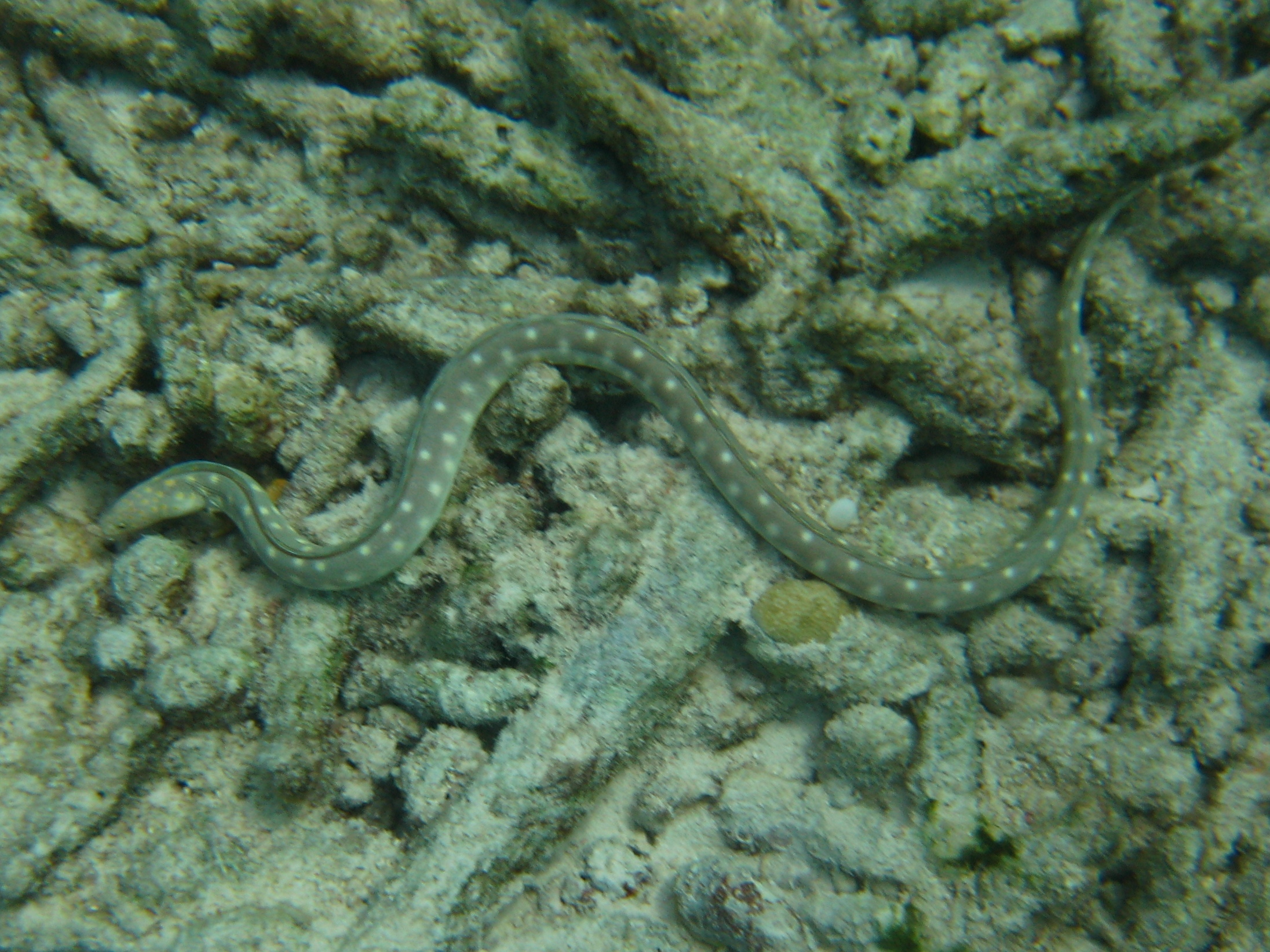

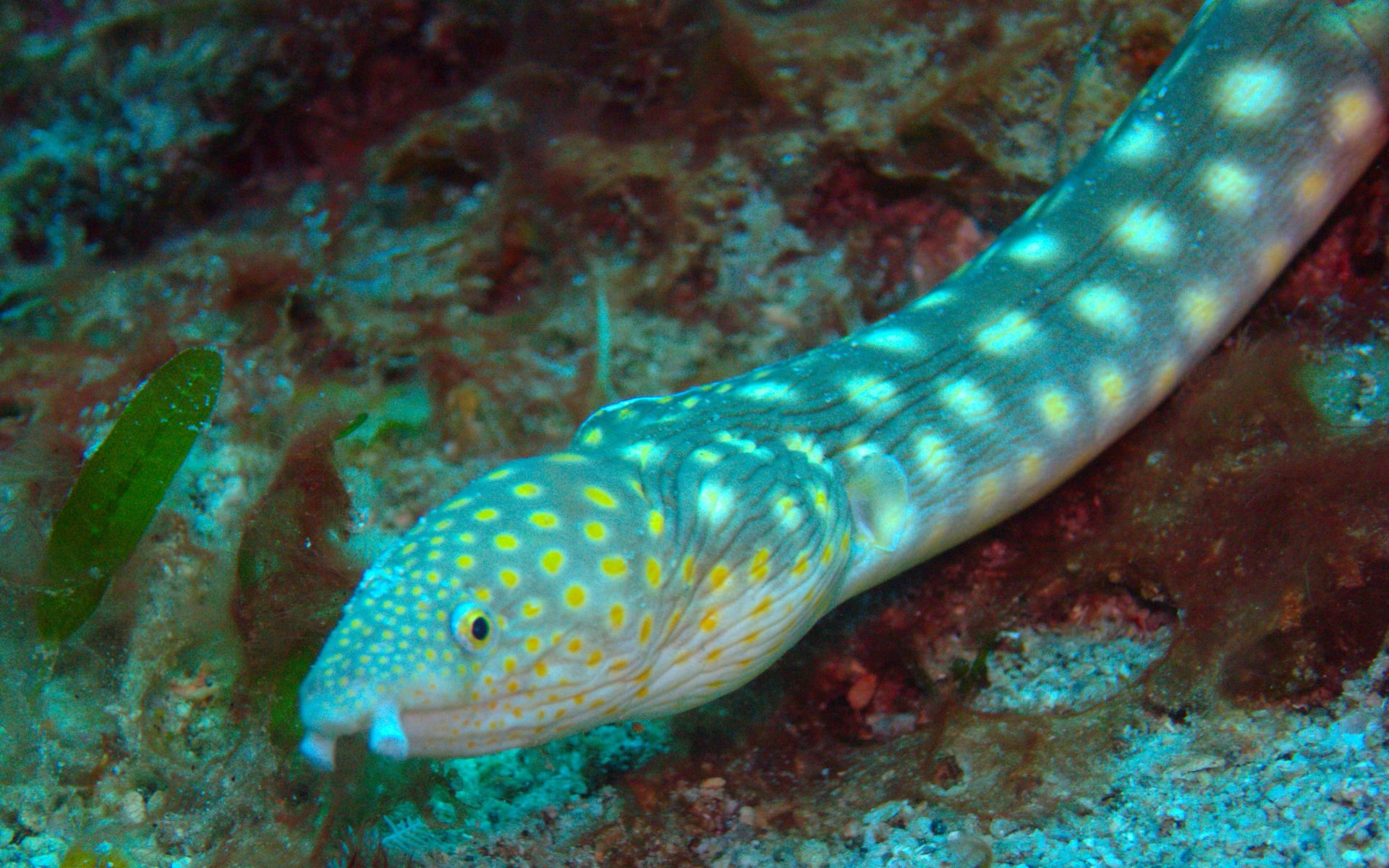
Close-up of sharptail eel, Douglas Bay, Dominica, 2012
