= Clarin =

Clarin or Clarín may refer to:

== Geography ==
- Clarin, Bohol, a municipality in the province of Bohol, Philippines
- Clarin, Misamis Occidental, a municipality in the province of Misamis Occidental, Philippines
- River Clarin, a river in Ireland

== Media ==
- Clarín Group, an Argentine media conglomerate
  - Clarín (Argentine newspaper)
  - Clarín Awards, awards sponsored by the newspaper above
- Clarín (Chilean newspaper)

== People ==
- Clarín (Leopoldo Alas, 1852–1901), Spanish writer
- Hans Clarin (1929–2005), German actor
- Irene Clarin (born 1955), German television and theatre actress

== Other uses ==
- CLARIN, a European research network for the humanities and social sciences
- Clarín 580 AM, a Uruguayan radio station specializing in tango
- Clarin-1, protein; see CLRN1

== See also ==
- Clarins, French cosmetics company
- Clarion (disambiguation)
