= Pisodonophis copelandi =

Scientific classification
- Kingdom: Animalia
- Phylum: Chordata
- Class: Actinopterygii
- Order: Anguilliformes
- Family: Ophichthidae
- Genus: Pisodonophis
- Species: P. copelandi

Binomial name
- Pisodonophis copelandi Herre, 1953

Synonyms
- Pisoodonophis copelandi Herre, 1953

Species of fish

Pisodonophis copelandi is an eel in the family Ophichthidae (worm/snake eels). It was described by Albert William Herre in 1953. It is a marine, tropical eel which is known from the Philippines, in the western central Pacific Ocean. Males can reach a maximum standard length of 30.8 centimetres (12.1 in).

Named in honor of botanist Edwin Bingham Copeland (1873-1964), who was a founder of the Philippine College of Agriculture.
