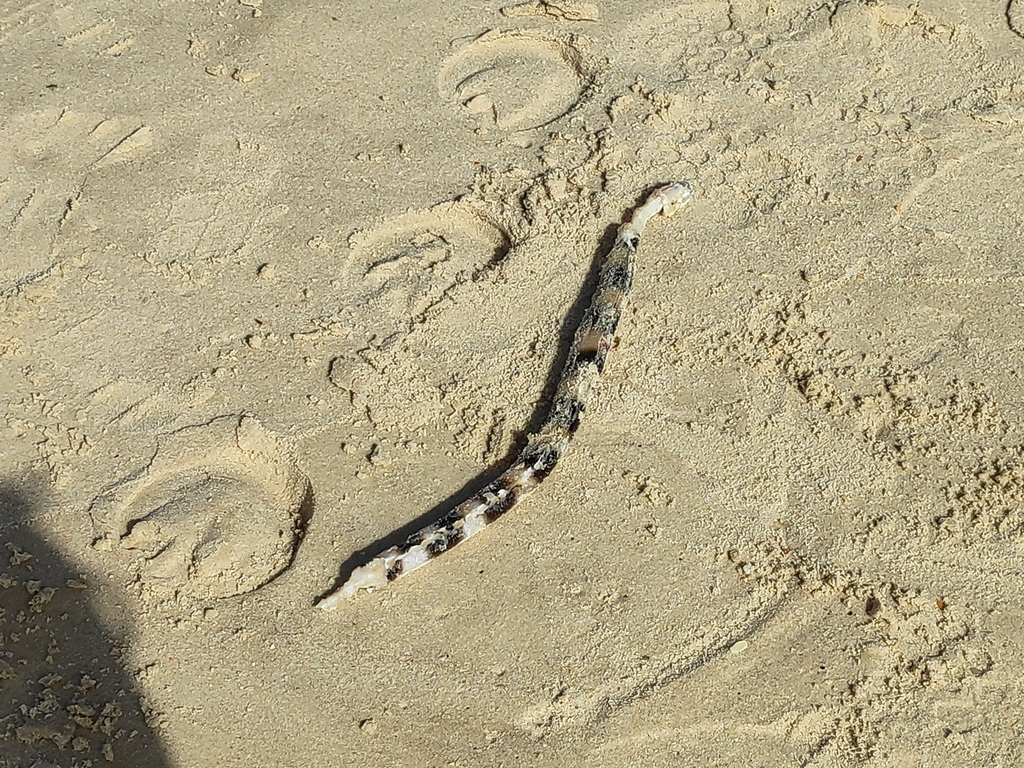

Scientific classification
- Kingdom: Animalia
- Phylum: Chordata
- Class: Actinopterygii
- Division: Teleostei
- Order: Anguilliformes
- Family: Ophichthidae
- Genus: Pisodonophis
- Species: P. semicinctus

Binomial name
- Pisodonophis semicinctus (Richardson, 1848)

= Pisodonophis semicinctus =

Species of fish

Pisodonophis semicinctus is an eel in the family Ophichthidae (worm/snake eels). First described by John Richardson in 1848, it is a marine, subtropical eel which is known in the eastern Atlantic Ocean from Gibraltar to Angola. It was first recorded in the Mediterranean Sea in 1958 off the coast of Algeria, and is now found on both shores of the western Basin. It dwells at a depth range of 10-30 meters and inhabits the continental shelf, where it forms burrows in sand and mud. Males can reach a maximum total length of 80 cm, but more commonly reach a TL of 60 cm.

P. semicinctus is of commercial interest to fisheries. Its diet consists of mollusks and benthic crustaceans.
