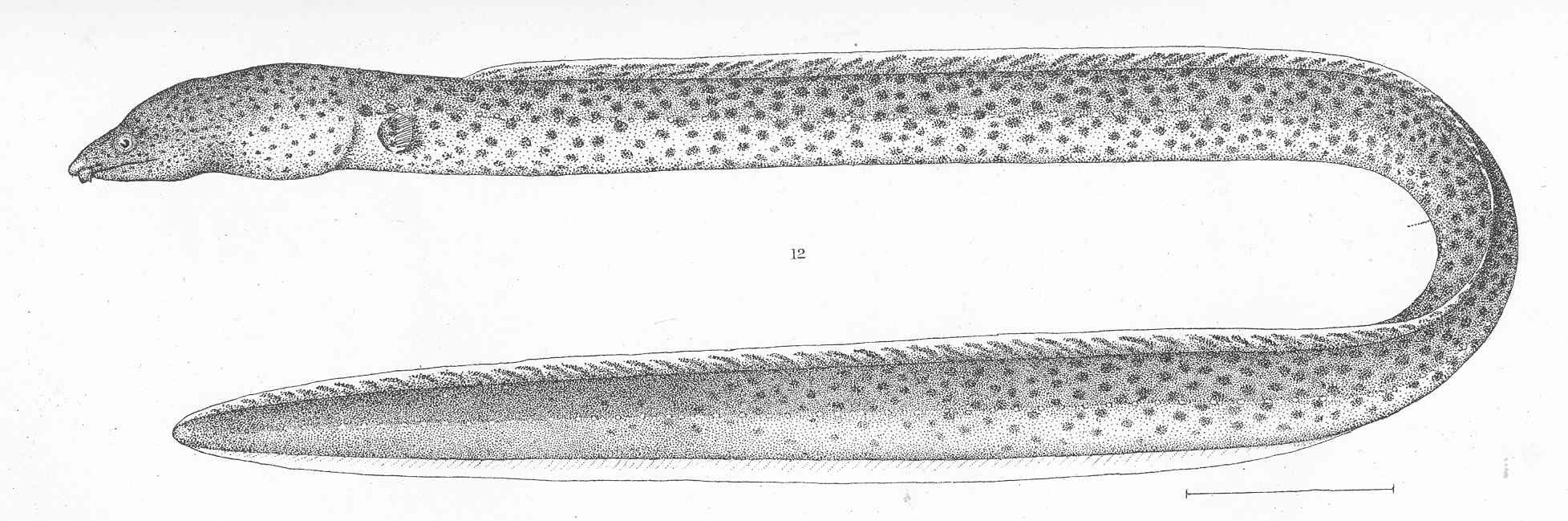

Scientific classification
- Domain: Eukaryota
- Kingdom: Animalia
- Phylum: Chordata
- Class: Actinopterygii
- Order: Anguilliformes
- Family: Ophichthidae
- Genus: Pisodonophis
- Species: P. daspilotus

Binomial name
- Pisodonophis daspilotus Gilbert, 1898

Synonyms
- Pisoodonophis daspilotus Gilbert, 1898

= Marble-toothed snake-eel =

Species of fish

The Marble-toothed snake-eel (Pisodonophis daspilotus, also known as the Blunt-toothed snake eel) is an eel in the family Ophichthidae (worm/snake eels). It was described by Charles Henry Gilbert in 1898. It is a marine, tropical eel which is known from the eastern central and southeastern Pacific Ocean, including Costa Rica, Colombia, Panama and Ecuador. It dwells in shallow waters at a maximum depth of 10 metres (33 ft), and inhabits sand and mud sediments and mangroves. Males can reach a maximum total length of 68 centimetres (27 in).

The IUCN redlist currently lists the Marble-toothed snake eel as Near Threatened, due to the decline in mangroves in its range of habitat. The population of the Marble-toothed snake eel is estimated to have declined by 25% over a course of 10–15 years.
