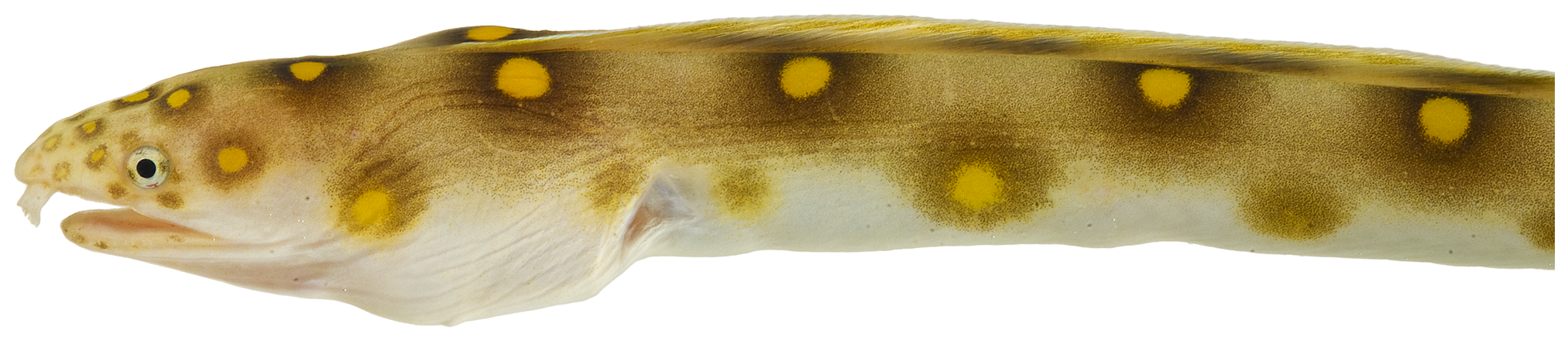

Conservation status
- Least Concern (IUCN 3.1)

Scientific classification
- Kingdom: Animalia
- Phylum: Chordata
- Class: Actinopterygii
- Division: Teleostei
- Order: Anguilliformes
- Family: Ophichthidae
- Genus: Myrichthys
- Species: M. ocellatus

Binomial name
- Myrichthys ocellatus (Lesueur, 1825)

Synonyms
- Muraenophis ocellata Lesueur, 1825; Pisodonophis oculatus Kaup, 1856; Myrichthys oculatus (Kaup, 1856); Myrichttys oculatus (Kaup, 1856); Ophisurus latemaculatus Poey, 1867; Myrichthys keckii Silvester, 1915

= Goldspotted eel =

Species of fish

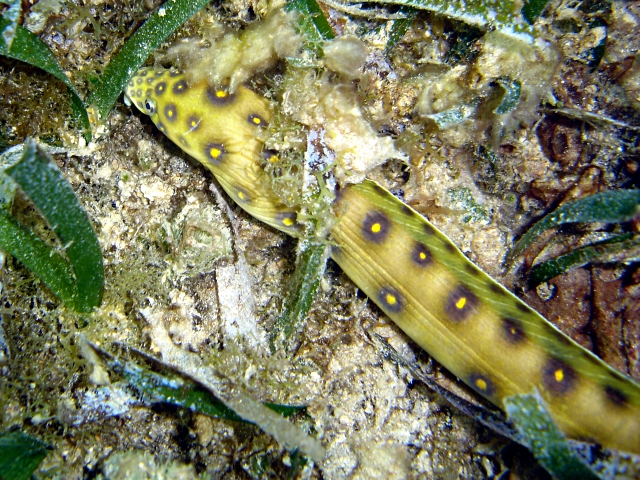
Myrichthys ocellatus

The goldspotted eel (Myrichthys ocellatus), also known as the goldspotted snake eel or the dark-spotted snake eel, is an eel in the family Ophichthidae (worm/snake eels). It was described by Charles Alexandre Lesueur in 1825, originally under the genus Muraenophis. It is a marine, tropical eel which is known from the western and eastern Atlantic Ocean, including Bermuda, southern Florida, USA; the Bahamas, Santa Catarina, and Brazil. It dwells at a maximum depth of 15 metres (49 ft), and inhabits rocky and coral reefs. It can reach a maximum total length of 110 cm (3.6 ft).

Goldspotted Eel (Myrichthys ocellatus) hunting in the shallows on Bonaire (Caribbean Netherlands).

The Goldspotted eel is a commercial aquarium fish. As is common with eels, it forages for food mostly during the night; its diet consists of crabs, stomatopods, and echinoderms.

A goldspotted eel at Sin City Aquatics, an aquarium store in Las Vegas.
