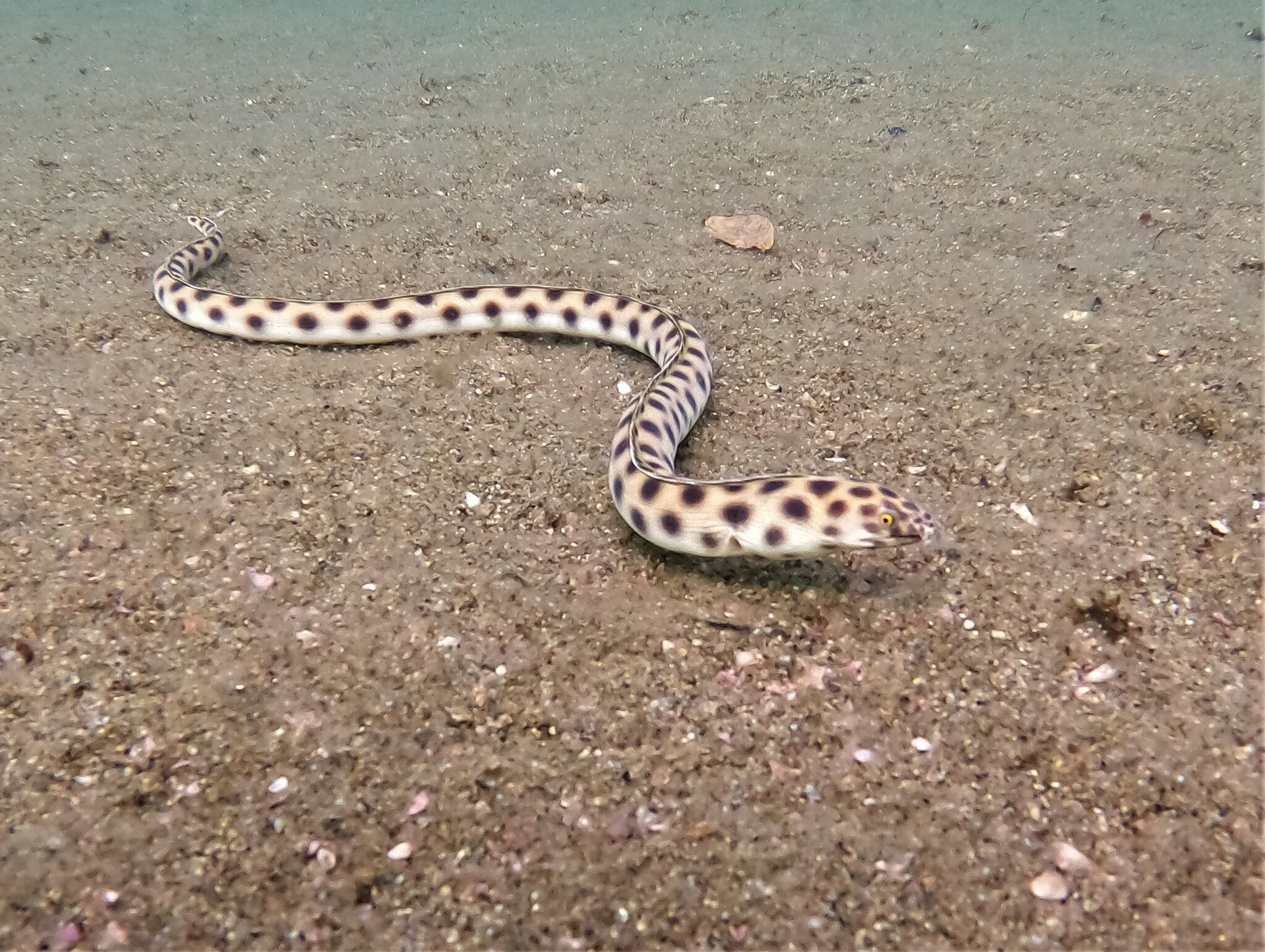

Conservation status
- Least Concern (IUCN 3.1)

Scientific classification
- Kingdom: Animalia
- Phylum: Chordata
- Class: Actinopterygii
- Order: Anguilliformes
- Family: Ophichthidae
- Genus: Myrichthys
- Species: M. xysturus

Binomial name
- Myrichthys xysturus (Jordan & Gilbert, 1882)

Synonyms
- Ophichthys xysturus Jordan & Gilbert, 1882; Callechelys peninsulae Gilbert, 1892

= Myrichthys xysturus =

Species of fish

Myrichthys xysturus is an eel in the family Ophichthidae (worm/snake eels). It was described by David Starr Jordan and Charles Henry Gilbert in 1882, originally under the genus Ophichthys. It is a marine, tropical eel which is known from the eastern central Pacific Ocean, including the Gulf of California; Baja California Sur, Mexico; and the Galapagos Islands.
