= Barry Farrimond =

British advocate for disabled child musicians (born 1980)

Barry Farrimond-Chuong or Barry John Farrimond (born 12 June 1980) is a British actor and the co-founder and CEO of British charity Open Up Music, which enables disabled children to take part in musical ensembles.

He co-founded Open Up Music and is its CEO. This charity works to enable children with disabilities to participate in musical ensembles, by helping schools to run accessible orchestras, supporting the National Open Youth Orchestra, and developing a new accessible instrument, the Clarion, which can be played using any body part including eye movements.

He has played the part of Ed Grundy in the long-running BBC Radio 4 serial The Archers since June 1999.

He was appointed M.B.E. in the 2018 Birthday Honours, "For Services to Accessible Music Technology". In 2025, he was awarded an honorary fellowship of the Royal Welsh College of Music and Drama.

In 2024 he was appointed co-chair of the Music Education Council.

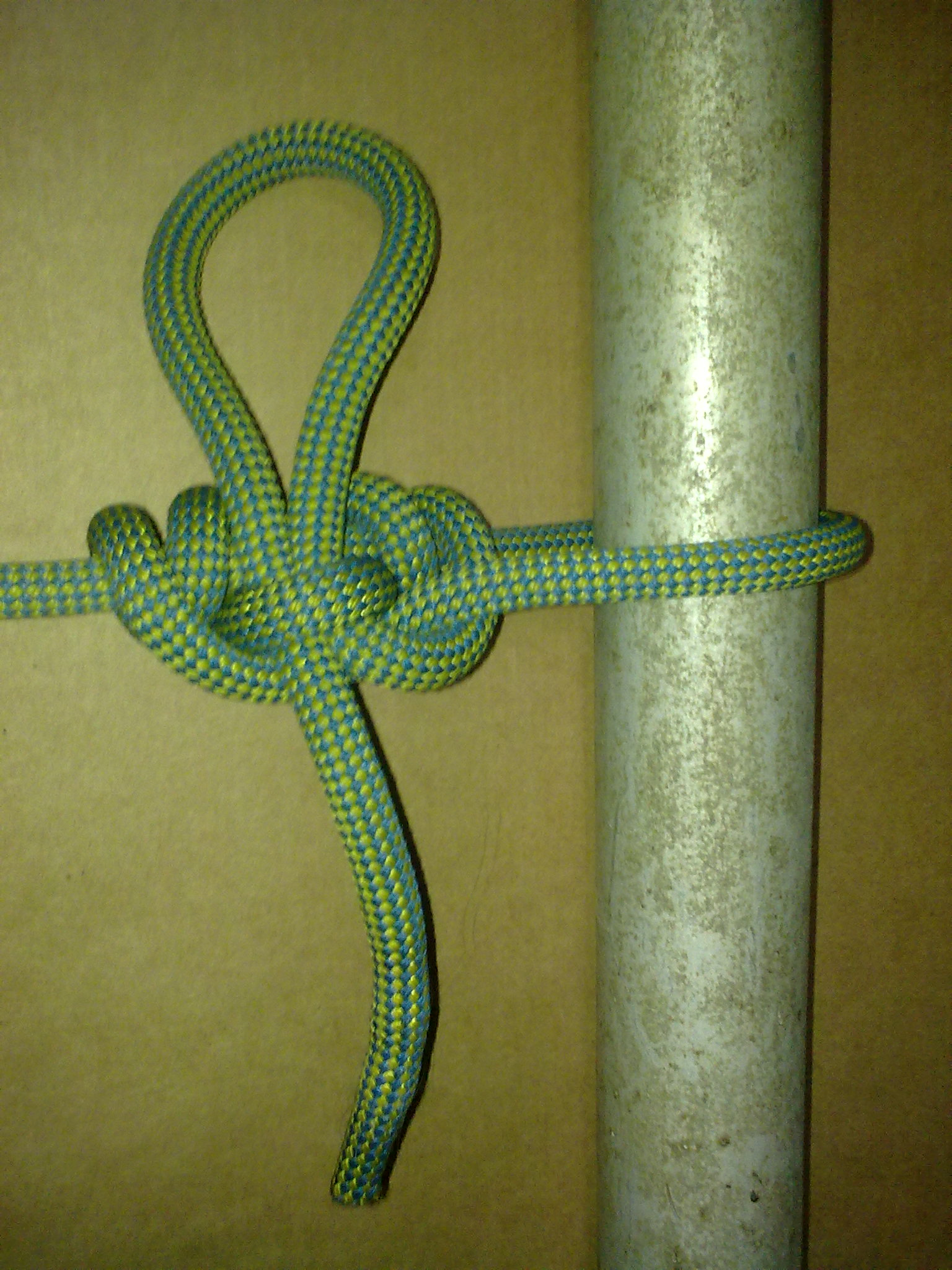
Farrimond friction hitch

The Farrimond friction hitch, a knot useful for tightening a line in camping or bushcraft, bears his name, after he demonstrated it at the Yellow Wood Bush Camp in Wales in 2008.
