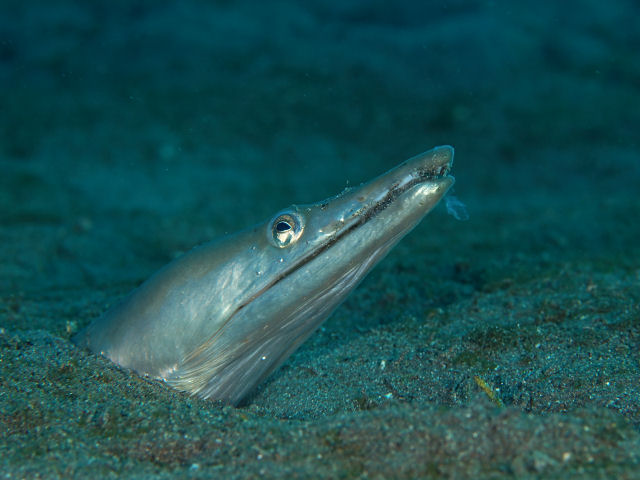

Scientific classification
- Kingdom: Animalia
- Phylum: Chordata
- Class: Actinopterygii
- Order: Anguilliformes
- Family: Ophichthidae
- Genus: Ophisurus
- Species: O. macrorhynchos

Binomial name
- Ophisurus macrorhynchos Bleeker, 1853

Synonyms
- Ophisurus macrorhynchus Bleeker, 1853 (misspelling)

= Ophisurus macrorhynchos =

Species of fish

Ophisurus macrorhynchos is an eel in the family Ophichthidae (worm/snake eels). It was described by Pieter Bleeker in 1853. It is a marine, temperate water-dwelling eel which is known from the Indo-Western Pacific and Atlantic Ocean. Males can reach a maximum total length of 140 centimetres (55 in), but more commonly reach a TL of 60 centimetres (24 in).

O. macrorhynchos is of commercial interest to fisheries.
