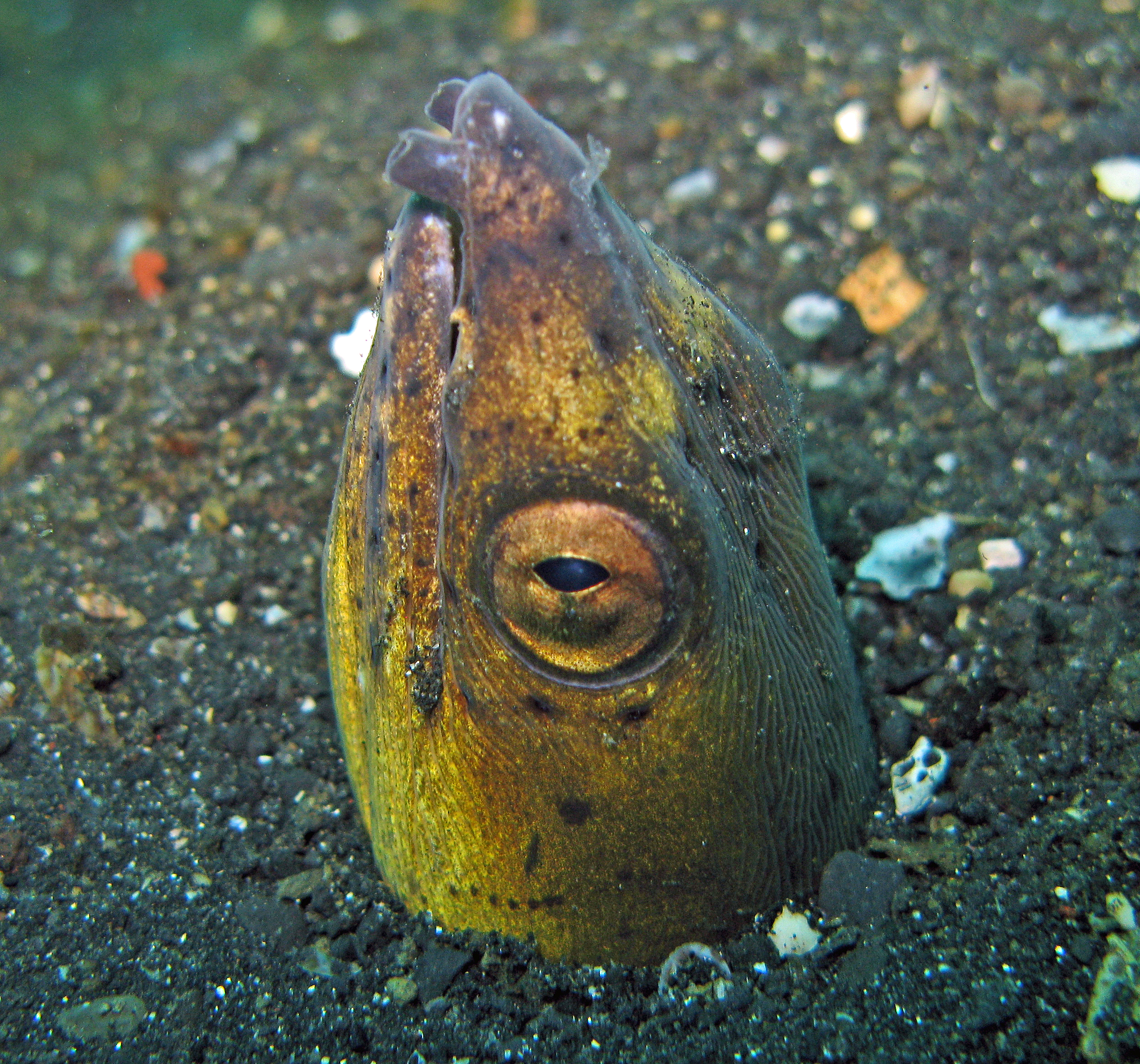

Scientific classification
- Kingdom: Animalia
- Phylum: Chordata
- Class: Actinopterygii
- Division: Teleostei
- Order: Anguilliformes
- Family: Ophichthidae
- Genus: Pisodonophis
- Species: P. cancrivorus

Binomial name
- Pisodonophis cancrivorus (J. Richardson, 1848)

Synonyms
- List: Ophisurus cancrivorus; Richardson, 1848: Ophichthys cancrivorus; (Richardson, 1848): Ophisurus cancrivomer; Richardson, 1848: Pisodonophis cancricorus; (Richardson, 1848): Pisodonophis cancrivorous; (Richardson, 1848): Pisodonphis cancrivorus; Richardson, 1848: Pisoodonophis cancrivorus; (Richardson, 1848): Ophisurus nigrepinnis; Liénard, 1842: Ophisurus sinensis; Richardson, 1848: Ophiurus baccidens; Cantor, 1849: Ophisurus baccidens; Cantor, 1849: Ophisurus schaapii; Bleeker, 1852: Ophisurus schaapi; Bleeker, 1852: Ophisurus brachysoma; Bleeker, 1853: Myrophis chrysogaster; Macleay, 1881: Ophichthys madagascariensis; Fourmanoir, 1961: Ophichthus madagascariensis; Fourmanoir, 1961: Ophichthus macrochir; (non Bleeker, 1853)

= Longfin snake-eel =

Species of fish

The longfin snake-eel (Pisodonophis cancrivorus) is an eel in the family Ophichthidae (worm/snake eels). It was described by John Richardson in 1848. It has a Dorsal fin beginning above its pectoral fin with a snake-like upper body which is cylindrical, but compressed only along its extreme tail tip. It also has a tubular nostril in front and a nostril along the lower edge of the lip in back. Colors range from grey to black to brown. Large longfin snake-eels have wrinkled skin.

== Inhabited Regions ==
Longfin snake-eels can survive in both marine and freshwater environments, and swim from the sea up rivers to spawn. Some are found in coral reefs and live from 1 to 20 meters below the surface. They are an Indo-Pacific tropical species that lives in the Red Sea region surrounded by East Africa, French Polynesia, Ogasawara Islands and Australia.

== Biology ==
Members of this species are typically 50 cm long, but may grow as long as 108 cm including their tails. They are born as males, but some transition to become females at maturity.

Longfin snake-eels are often found in lagoons and estuaries that as they enter freshwater. Loose groups of the eels congregate in tidal channels with their heads peeking up from below the surface. Anglers catch them with bag nets in estuaries and tidal areas.
