= Longfin spotted snake eel =

Conservation status
- Least Concern (IUCN 3.1)

Scientific classification
- Kingdom: Animalia
- Phylum: Chordata
- Class: Actinopterygii
- Order: Anguilliformes
- Family: Ophichthidae
- Genus: Myrichthys
- Species: M. aspetocheiros

Binomial name
- Myrichthys aspetocheiros McCosker & Rosenblatt, 1993

Species of fish

The longfin spotted snake eel (Myrichthys aspetocheiros) is an eel in the family Ophichthidae (worm/snake eels). It was described by John E. McCosker and Richard Heinrich Rosenblatt in 1993. It is a marine, tropical eel which is known from Mexico, Costa Rica and Panama, in the eastern central Pacific Ocean. It dwells at a depth range of 44 to 64 metres (140 to 210 ft), and inhabits sandy substrates. Males can reach a maximum total length of 51 centimetres (1 ft 8 in).

Due to its moderately widespread distribution in the eastern Pacific, lack of known threats, and lack of observed population decline, the IUCN redlist currently lists the Longfin spotted snake-eel as Least Concern.
