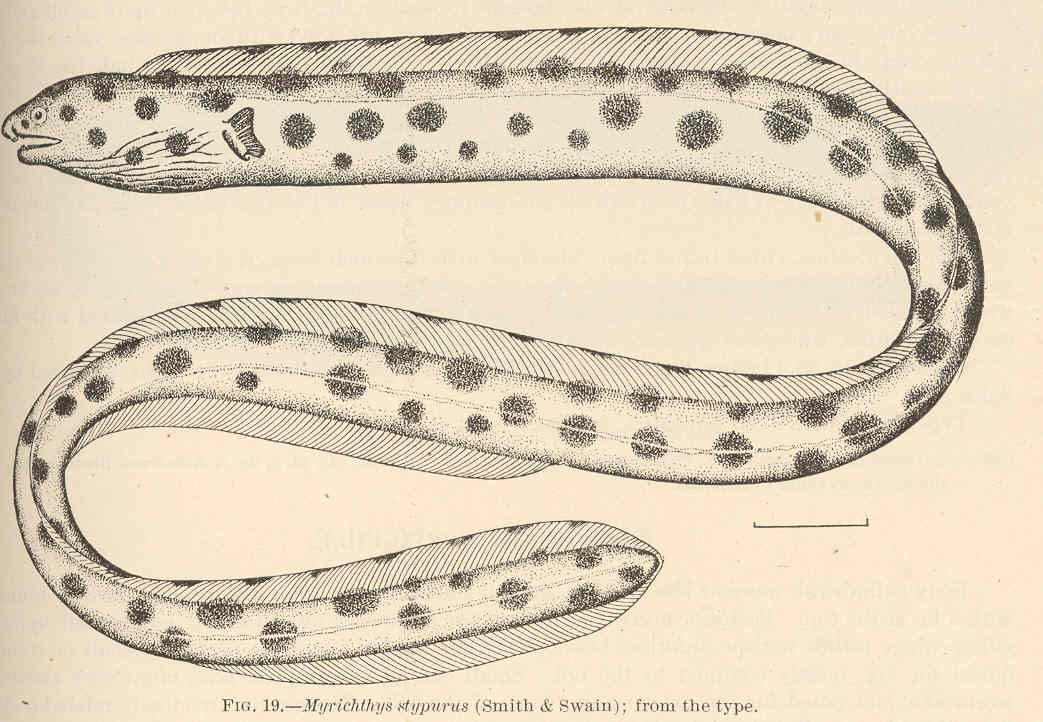

Conservation status
- Least Concern (IUCN 3.1)

Scientific classification
- Kingdom: Animalia
- Phylum: Chordata
- Class: Actinopterygii
- Order: Anguilliformes
- Family: Ophichthidae
- Genus: Myrichthys
- Species: M. magnificus

Binomial name
- Myrichthys magnificus (Abbott, 1860)

Synonyms
- Pisoodonophis magnifica Abbott, 1860; Ophichthys stypurus Smith & Swain, 1882; Ophichthus stypurus Smith & Swain, 1882

= Magnificent snake eel =

The magnificent snake eel (Myrichthys magnificus), also known as the Hawaiian spotted snake eel, is an eel in the family Ophichthidae (worm/snake eels). The Hawaiian name for these creatures is Puhi La'au. It was described by Charles Conrad Abbott in 1860, originally under the genus Pisodonophis. It is a marine eel endemic to the Hawaiian Islands.

== Description ==
The Hawaiian spotted snake eel is covered with dark brown spots on its white body. It can grow to be three feet in length. It has two pectoral fins close to its head, and it has one long dorsal fin starting at its head and running all the way down its back. These creatures swim much like how a snake moves on the ground.

== Distribution and habitat ==
The Hawaiian spotted snake eel is endemic to the Hawaiian Islands. It dwell mostly underground in the sand of the Neritic zone which is right off the shore, but they are also said to be found at 10-860 feet below the ocean. They burrow using the pointed ends of their tails, and they keep pushing into the sand until they are completely hidden.

== Diet ==
Hawaiian spotted snake eels usually hunt among the reefs or ocean floor. They eat crustaceans, small fish, and carrion. Sometimes they do not even leave their home; when a meal swims by their burrow, they launch out, grab it, and retreat back inside. They also hunt in the afternoon or at night as a pack.
