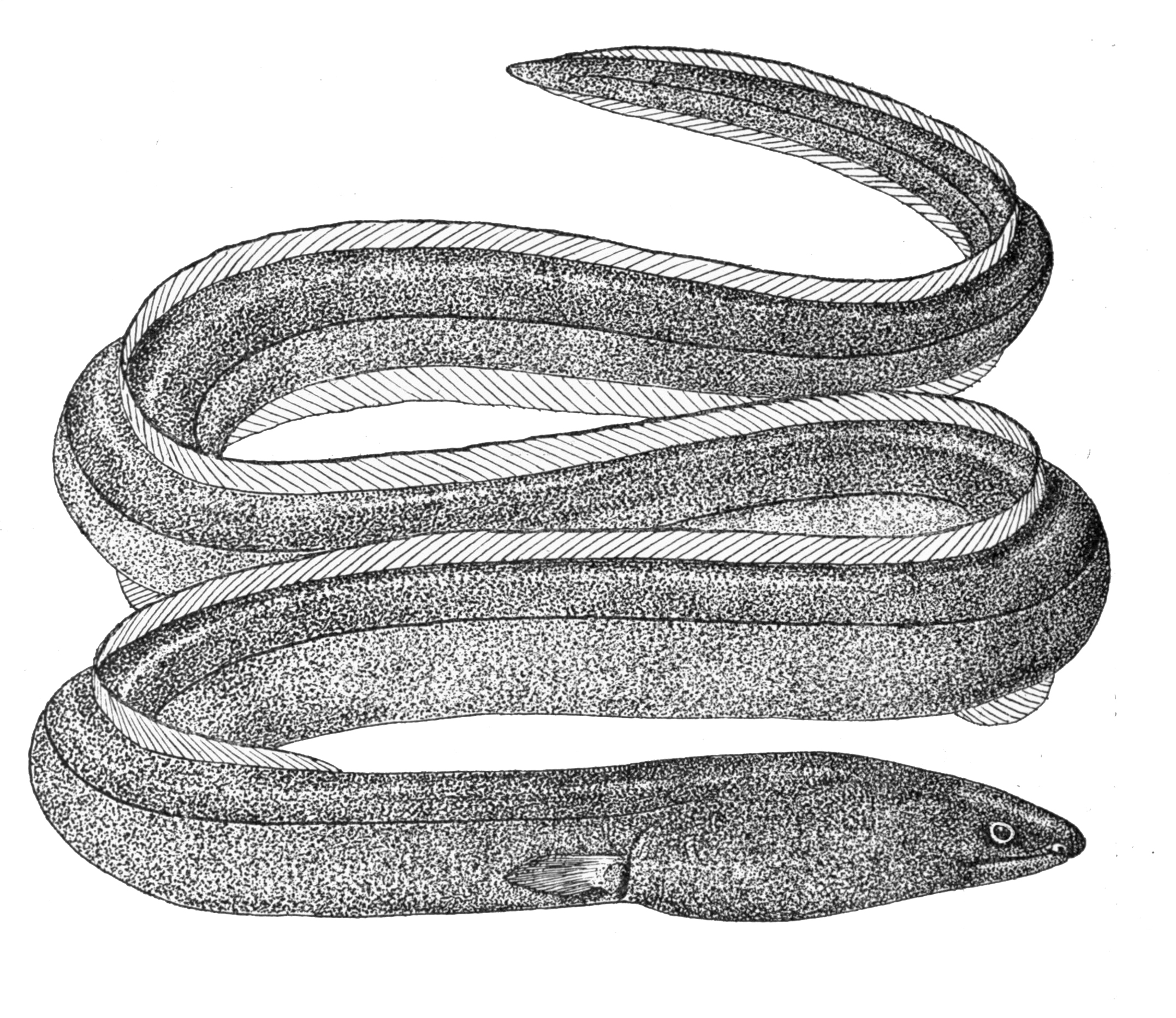

Conservation status
- Least Concern (IUCN 3.1)

Scientific classification
- Kingdom: Animalia
- Phylum: Chordata
- Class: Actinopterygii
- Order: Anguilliformes
- Family: Ophichthidae
- Genus: Pisodonophis
- Species: P. boro

Binomial name
- Pisodonophis boro (Hamilton, 1822)

Synonyms
- List: Ophisurus boro Hamilton, 1822, Ophichthys boro (Hamilton, 1822); Pisodontophis bora (Hamilton, 1822); Pisoodonophis boro (Hamilton, 1822); Ophisurus harancha Hamilton, 1822; Ophisurus caudatus McClelland, 1844; Ophisurus sinensis Richardson, 1848; Ophiurus baccidens Cantor, 1849; Ophisurus baccidens Cantor, 1849; Conger microstoma Eydoux & Souleyet, 1850; Ophisurus brachysoma Bleeker, 1853; Ophisurus schaapii Bleeker, 1853; Ophisurus schaapi Bleeker, 1853; Ophisurus potamophilus Bleeker, 1854; Pisodonophis assamensis Sen, 1986

= Rice-paddy eel =

Species of fish

The rice-paddy eel (Pisodonophis boro; also known commonly as the Bengal's snake-eel, the estuary snake eel, or the snake eel) is an eel in the family Ophichthidae (worm-snake eels). It was described by Francis Buchanan-Hamilton in 1822, originally in the genus Ophisurus. It is a tropical, marine eel which is known from the Indo-West Pacific, including Somalia, Tanzania, South Africa, India, Pakistan, Sri Lanka, Indonesia, Polynesia, Australia, Bangladesh, Cambodia, Kenya, Madagascar, the Philippines, Malaysia, Mozambique, Seychelles, Saudi Arabia, Taiwan, China, Thailand, Vietnam, and southern Yemen. It is an anadromous species and spawns in freshwater, often in rice paddies during the rainy season, earning it its common name. It also spends time in lagoons, estuaries and coastal rivers, in which it lives in burrows in the river bottom and bank. Males can reach a maximum total length (TL) of 100 centimetres, but more commonly reach a TL of 70 cm.

The rice-paddy eel is of minor commercial interest to fisheries; it is caught in bag nets and marketed fresh. Its diet consists of bony fish and crabs such as Uca annulipes; as a nocturnal creature it forages actively during the night. Due to its widespread, albeit thinly populated distribution, and lack of major threats, the IUCN redlist currently lists the rice-paddy eel as Least Concern. It notes, however, that the species is subject to agricultural pollution. Pisodonophis boro is an endemic fish in Vietnam's coastal region, it is also found in the paddy fields of the Hải Phòng area of Vietnam, where the small fry are known as "cá nhệch" and "nhệch fish" and are eaten in a local salad, gỏi nhệch.
