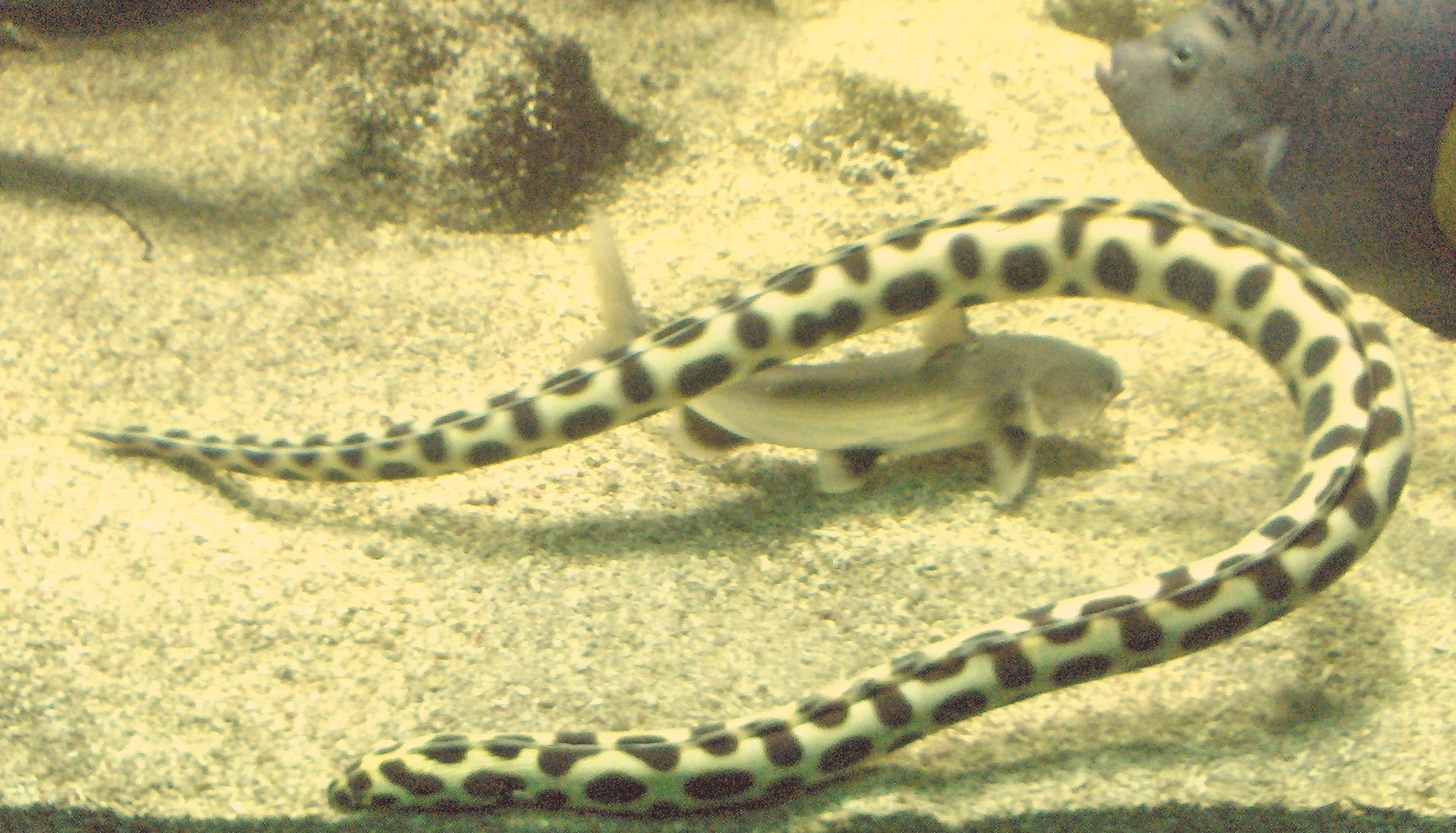
- Tiger snake eel, Myrichthys maculosus

Scientific classification
- Domain: Eukaryota
- Kingdom: Animalia
- Phylum: Chordata
- Class: Actinopterygii
- Order: Anguilliformes
- Family: Ophichthidae
- Subfamily: Ophichthinae
- Genus: Myrichthys; Girard, 1859

Type species
- Myrichthys tigrinus Girard, 1859

Species
- See text

= Myrichthys =

Genus of fishes

Myrichthys is a genus of snake eels currently containing 11 recognized species found in tropical and warm temperate oceans worldwide.

== Species ==
- Myrichthys aspetocheiros McCosker & Rosenblatt, 1993 (longfin spotted snake eel)
- Myrichthys breviceps (J. Richardson, 1848) (Sharptail eel)
- Myrichthys colubrinus (Boddaert, 1781) (harlequin snake eel)
- Myrichthys maculosus (Cuvier, 1816) (tiger snake eel)
- Myrichthys magnificus (C. C. Abbott, 1860) (magnificent snake eel)
- Myrichthys ocellatus (Lesueur, 1825) (gold-spotted eel)
- Myrichthys paleracio McCosker & G. R. Allen, 2012
- Myrichthys pantostigmius D. S. Jordan & E. A. McGregor, 1898 (clarion snake eel)
- Myrichthys pardalis (Valenciennes, 1839) (leopard eel)
- Myrichthys tigrinus Girard, 1859 (spotted snake eel)
- Myrichthys xysturus (D. S. Jordan & C. H. Gilbert, 1882)
