= Korean snake eel =

Scientific classification
- Domain: Eukaryota
- Kingdom: Animalia
- Phylum: Chordata
- Class: Actinopterygii
- Order: Anguilliformes
- Family: Ophichthidae
- Genus: Pisodonophis
- Species: P. sangjuensis

Binomial name
- Pisodonophis sangjuensis Ji & Kim, 2011

Species of fish

The Korean snake eel (Pisodonophis sangjuensis) is an eel in the family Ophichthidae (worm/snake eels). It was described by Hwan-Sung Ji and Jin-Koo Kim in 2011. It is a marine, temperate water-dwelling eel which is known from Korea, in the northwestern Pacific Ocean. It dwells at a depth range of 5 to 110 meters (16 to 361 ft), and uses its hard, pointed tail to form burrows in sand and mud sediments. Females can reach a maximum total length of 60.1 centimeters (23.7 in).

The species epithet "sangjuensis" refers to the Korean snake eel's type locality, in Sangju.
