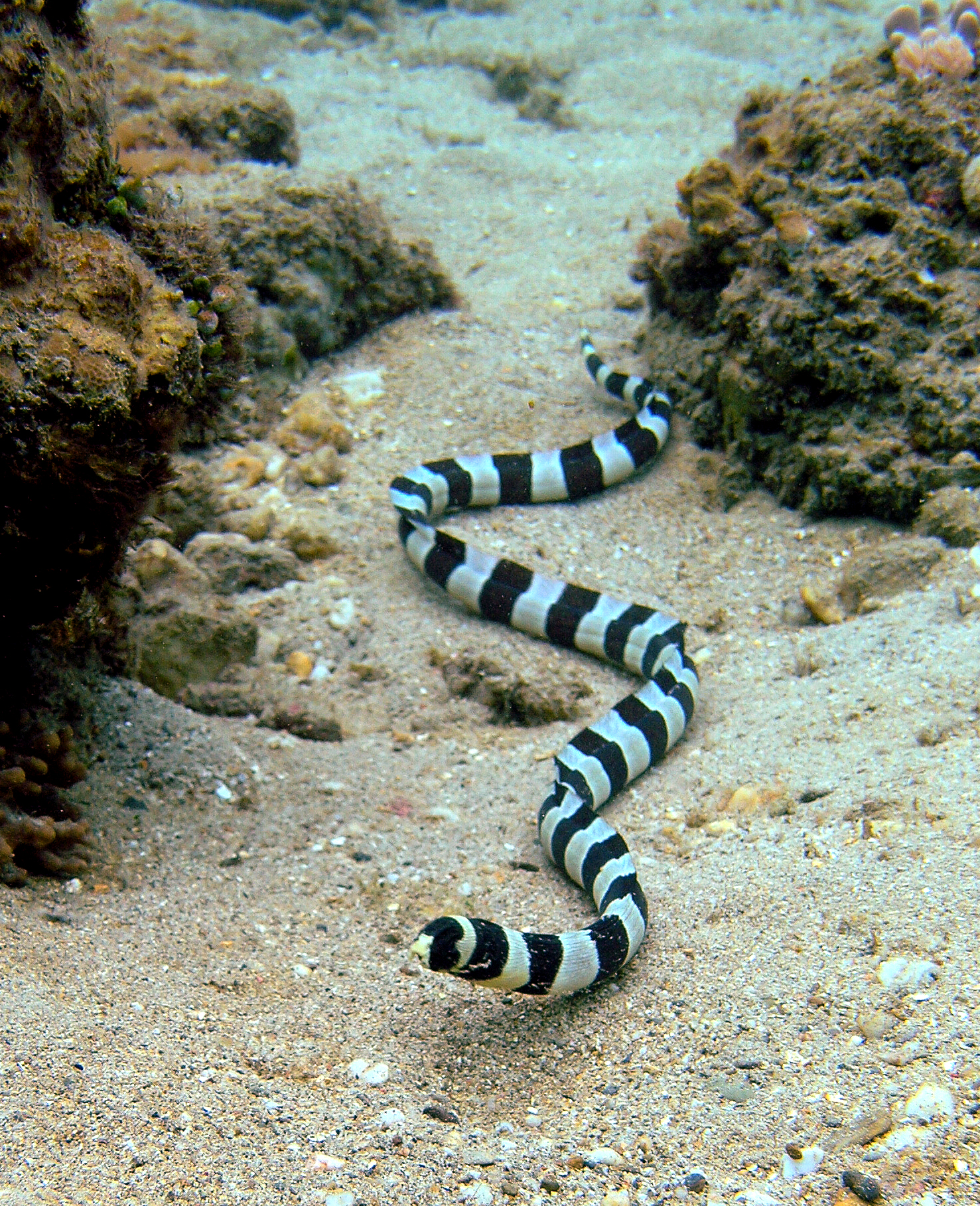

Conservation status
- Least Concern (IUCN 3.1)

Scientific classification
- Kingdom: Animalia
- Phylum: Chordata
- Class: Actinopterygii
- Order: Anguilliformes
- Family: Ophichthidae
- Genus: Myrichthys
- Species: M. colubrinus

Binomial name
- Myrichthys colubrinus (Boddaert, 1781)

= Myrichthys colubrinus =

Species of fish

Myrichthys colubrinus, most commonly known as the banded snake eel, but is also referred to as the ringed snake eel or harlequin eel, is of the order of Anguiliformes. Anguiliformes include fishes that have long tubular body shapes. M. colubrinus is from the family Ophichthidae. Ophichthidae is one of the most ecologically diverse families present in the Anguiliformes order. Ophicthidae makes up approximately 260 species with 50 different genera. Animals from this family are commonly referred to as snake eels or worm eels due to their extended body shape, narrow heads and lack of defined fins, except for the large dorsal fin that runs down most of the length of their bodies and small pectoral fins. They are also notable for having particularly sharp and hard snouts and tails to support a burrowing lifestyle. Due to the fact that there are so many individuals within this family, identification can be challenging. This is especially notable when the eels are in their larval form. Many look incredibly similar to the point that identifying unique species from each other is not easy.

== Species Description ==
M. colubrinus is notable for being a batesian mimic of the sea krait. This means that despite being a non-venomous animal, by copying the visual appearance of the highly venomous sea krait they can remain relatively safe from predators. This eel has broad bands of black and white from the anterior to the posterior end. With a body shape that copies the movement of the sea krait. The eels were noted by a scientist in 1922 as being seen in muddy areas of Ambon in the East Indies. It has been stated by scientists that have noted the two animals in the same area that it can be very challenging to tell the difference between the snake and eel when spotted from afar. The coloring can be further described with the white parts of the eel having a slightly grey tinge. This allows the eel to maintain a semblance of countershading. The white bands also lighten as they get closer to the black bands. There is a lot of variety seen within the species in terms of the size of the banding. This is suspected to be because banded snake eels in different regions copy variations in phenotype seen in the sea snakes they mimic. The bands also change in frequency with there being anywhere between 25–35 stripes seen on an adult.

When looking at their body you take into consideration the common name this family of eels fall into. They are referred to as snake eels or as worm eels. This is because their body shape lacks any sort of defined characteristics other than being cylindrical, long, narrow and smooth. The banded snake eels have approximately 198–202 vertebrae, though a separate source claims that vertebrae could be anywhere from 190–202. They are described in having a circular cross section along with a very pointed head and tail.

A unique feature that makes eels in the genus Myricthys is how they have posterior nostrils located either within the mouth, or located along the upper lip. The anterior nostrils on the other hand are notably protruding from the face, being tubular in shape. Snake eels from the Myricthys genus are also categorized by having molariform teeth, with the banded snake eel having specifically granular style teeth that are contained within two rows in the jaw. The body length is on average 51–68 cm with the largest specimen having been found being 97 cm in length from tip of the snout to tip of the tail. There are small pectoral fins that can be seen on the banded snake eels if you look behind the gills. The only other fins visible on the eels are its dorsal fins. The dorsal fin blends in with the body but runs all the way down the back of the fish to the tail. It is this fin that supports their movement along with their body shape. They move in a very methodical and typically slow undulation. M. colubrinus moves by changing their entire body shape along their spine in to an "S" configuration to push themselves through the water and across the rocky and coral-filled reefs of which they live.

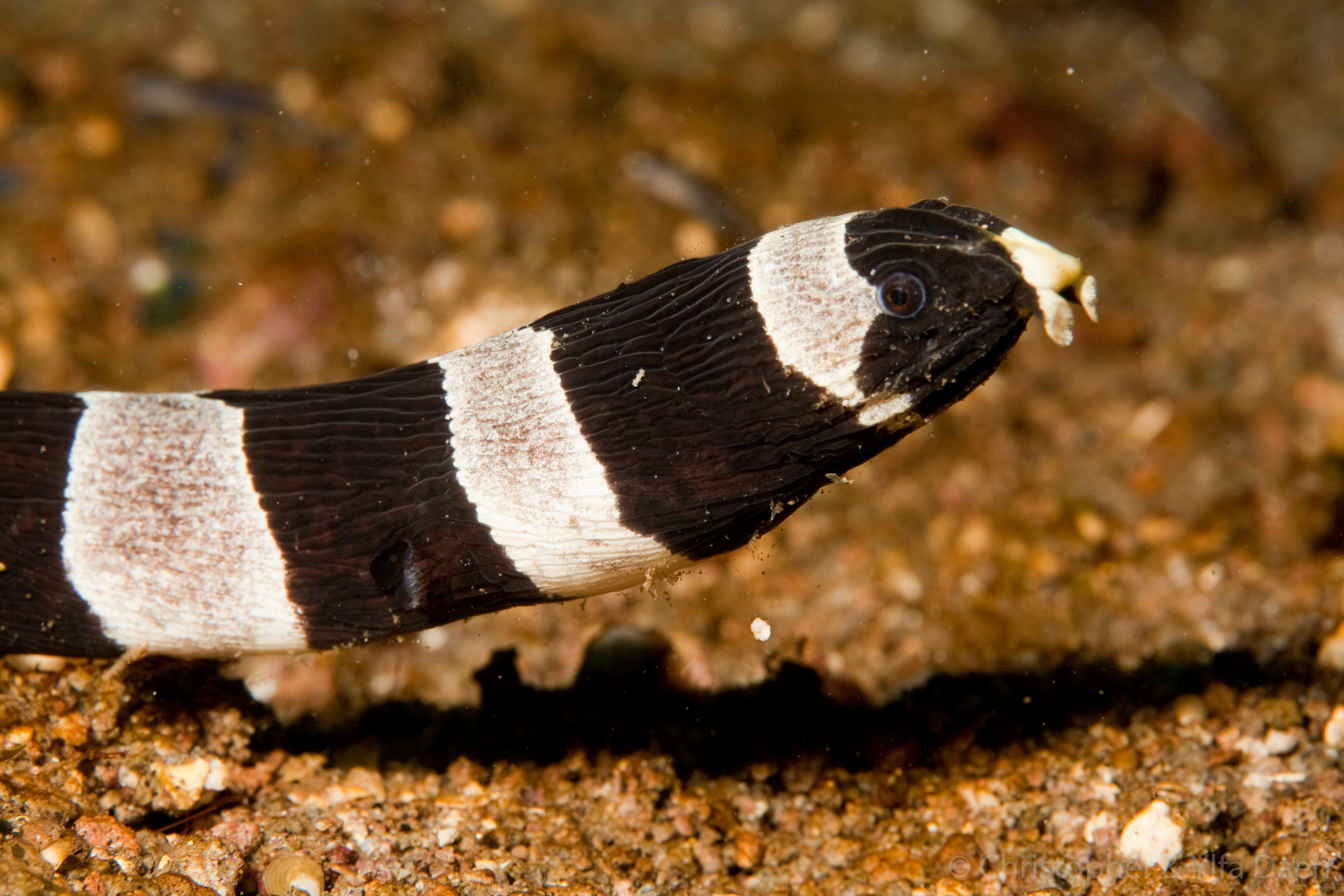
Image illustrating head and unique protrusible nostrils of Banded Snake Eel.

== Reproduction ==
The larval and developmental stages are widely not understood for the Myricthys genus. Looking at the Ophicthidae family we know that eels are all primarily nocturnal. This is also true of their larva. All Ophicthids are known to have pelagic leptocephalus larvae. It is also considered that Ophicthidae eels have a long larval stage, with the larvae and eggs of the eel being very hard to identify in a species specific way without genetic testing. Further information about breeding habits has not been researched.

== Distribution ==
Ophichthidae are one of the most widely spread families scattering across the Indo-Pacific region at a variety of depth. They are most commonly found within the coastal regions of these oceans from Australia to Japan and Hawaii. Some species are even found along the coast of Mexico. Other individuals in the family are known to bury into the sandy sea floor of tropical and subtropical waters. They have been discovered to be anywhere from tidal zones to locations up to 800 meters below the surface. The family Ophichthidae is highly populous in tropical waters close to the coast. Distribution is difficult to discern because many eels in the same family as the banded snake eel often only have their heads poking out of the sands of which they’ve buried themselves.

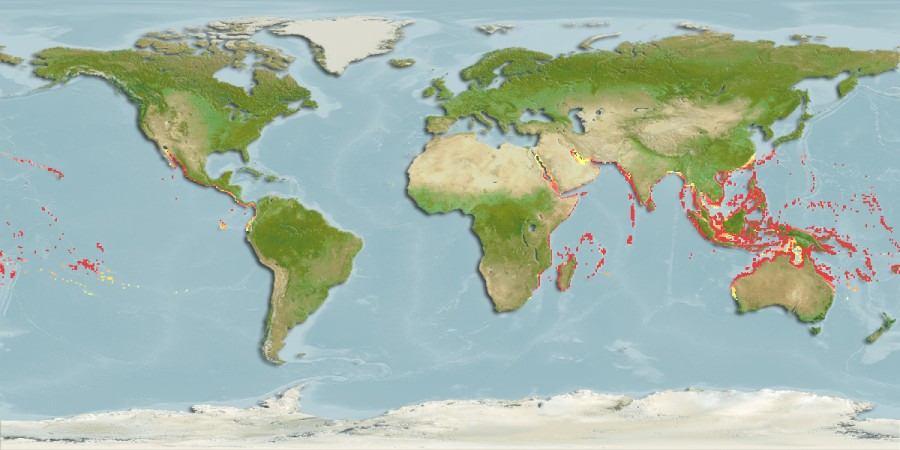
Distribution map of Banded Snake Eel.

The banded snake eels was recorded recently off of the coast of Hawaii but are known to be a very widespread species having been spotted in the Indian Ocean, Red Sea and along the southern coast of Africa. Many island chains such as the Line Islands, Society Islands and Tuamotu archipelago include them as well. Lastly they have been seen in the western pacific by the coats of New South Wales Australia and Japan.

== Diet and Hunting Behaviors ==
Snake eels in the same family of M. colubrinus, Myricthys, have been recorded eating crustaceans such as crabs and shrimp. Most in the family are considered to be nocturnal. Whereas M. colubrinus can often be spotted out on the seabed during the day. This is speculated to be because they are active mimics of the sea krait. In order to make that mimicry even more believable these eels match the snakes behavioral styles. The banded snake eels are still often active at night as well. It would not be very effective mimicry if the eels hid their bodies, the thing that marks them as mimics of the venomous sea krait, from prospective predators.

The hunting style of these eels can be described by the way they actively search the sand flats and sea grasses they live in. Using their narrow heads, they probe holes in rocks to search out their prey. Not only do snake eels rely on their heads to find food, but they will also use their tails to flush or feel out prey in narrow holes. The Myrichthys eels have been observed smelling their prey in burrows on the sea floor and first probing with their heads. When they realize their prey is too buried too deep, they will rely on the sharp end of their tail. They will stick their tails into the burrows and whip their bodies in an arc back and form in a fast motion in order to clear sand and reach their prey. This means they are active hunters in contrast to sitting and waiting for prey to come to them. It has been noted that many Aguiliformes will have follower species of fish that act like mobbing birds in predator prey interactions that are attempting to get scraps or to hunt other animals the eel may flush out of hiding. Myrichthys eels have been seen with these fish and have not been reported in trying to catch and eat their follower fish.

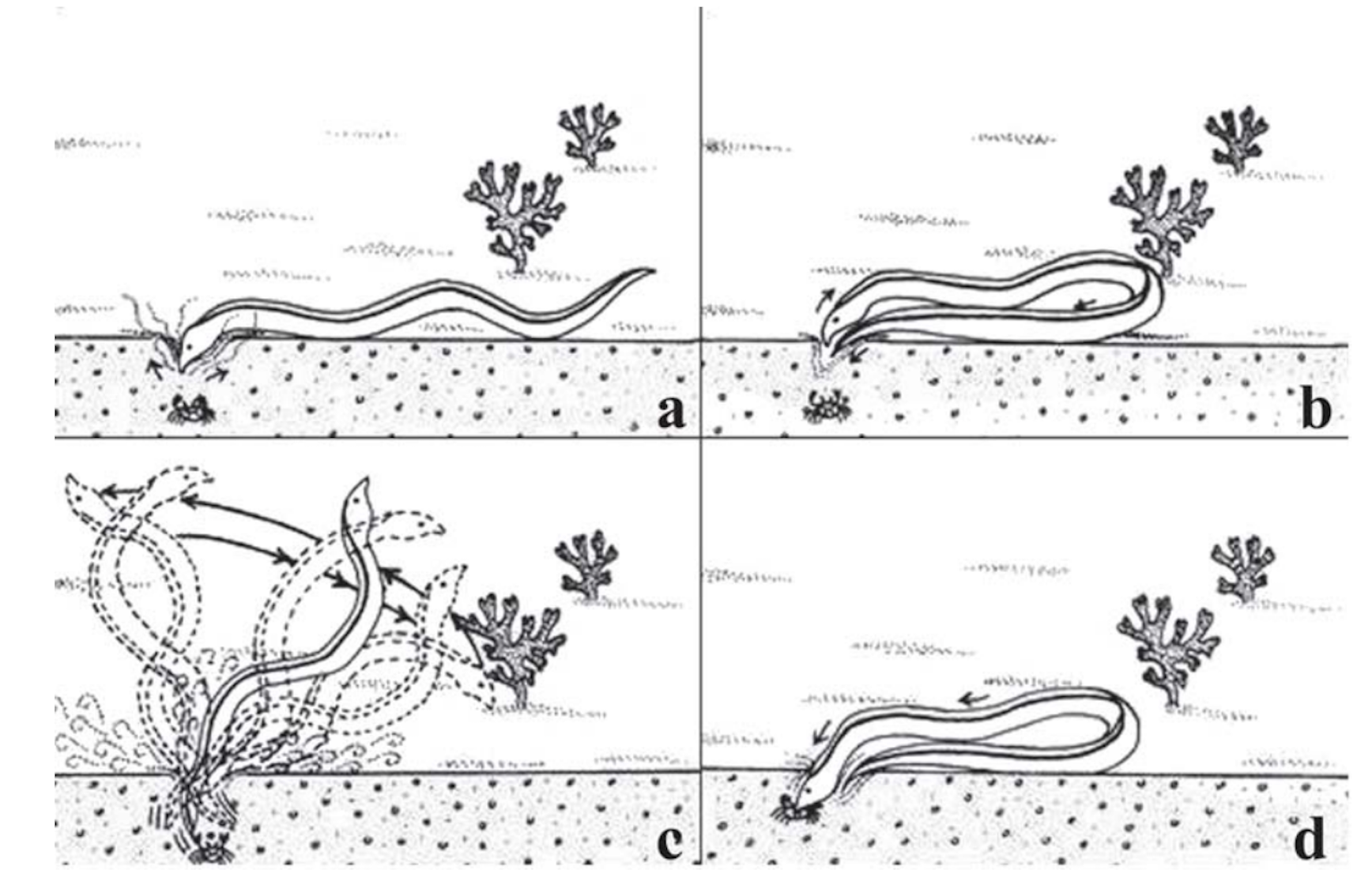
Figure on feeding behavior of Myricthys eels.

== Conservation Status ==
This species was originally described by Pieter Boddaert in 1781. This means it is not a new species to science, but along with many fish it is under studied and underrepresented in literature. There are no attempts at a fishery for this species, with sea eels as a whole not being a highly farmed group of fish, unlike their freshwater cousins. M. colubrinus is currently considered to be a species of least concern as of November 2020 via a census done by the IUCN Red List, but there is a borderline lack of data that leads this to be virtually unknown. The banded snake eel is considered a tropical reef fish, meaning it heavily relies on the stability of the world's reefs. Reefs are currently facing a lot of issues in regards to corals bleaching and biodiversity within them dramatically falling. If this eel loses its habitat and food source, it too will start to quickly decline in population. This means that the banded snake eel population is vulnerable to climate change affecting their habitat, which could lead to their demise.

Anguilliforms in general are very challenging fishes to gain conservation and population status on. Many of the species spend a majority of their time underground and are fairly evasive. This leads to population studies to be vastly inaccurate as a whole. Most types of census data, including underwater visual census, led to a severe lack of data. One study from the journal of Marine Biology revealed that the best way to get a wide variety of specimens is to check the stomach contents of Sea Kraits. The sea krait is an active predator of most Anguilliformes, meaning their stomachs contained a wider variety of individuals and species than any previous census data collection yielded. In this specific study 14 new species were discovered.

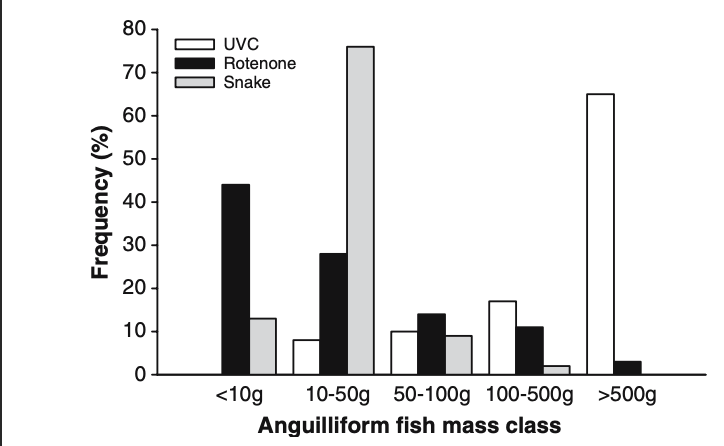
Figure about success of observations of varied eel species from different collection methods.
