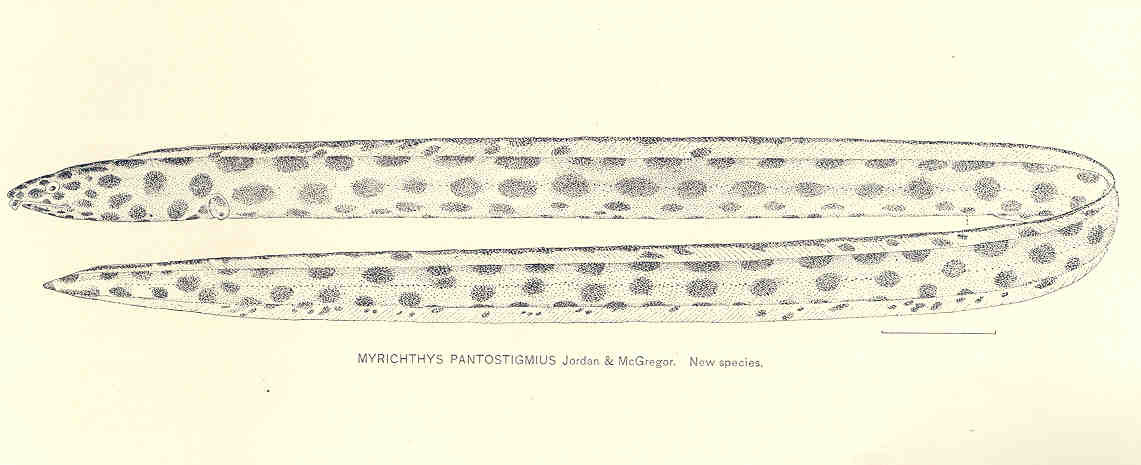

Conservation status
- Least Concern (IUCN 3.1)

Scientific classification
- Kingdom: Animalia
- Phylum: Chordata
- Class: Actinopterygii
- Order: Anguilliformes
- Family: Ophichthidae
- Genus: Myrichthys
- Species: M. pantostigmius

Binomial name
- Myrichthys pantostigmius Jordan & E. A. McGregor, 1898

= Clarion snake eel =

Species of fish

The Clarion snake eel (Myrichthys pantostigmius) is an eel in the family Ophichthidae (worm/snake eels). It was described by David Starr Jordan and Ernest Alexander McGregor in 1898. It is a tropical, marine eel which is known from Mexico, in the eastern central Pacific Ocean. It inhabits shallow waters - at a maximum depth of 20 metres - and is found around rocks and sand. Males can reach a maximum total length of 49.4 centimetres (19.4 in).

Following an assessment carried out on 22 May 2007, due to a lack of known threats and a lack of observed population decline, the Clarion snake eel was listed in the IUCN redlist as Least Concern in 2010.
