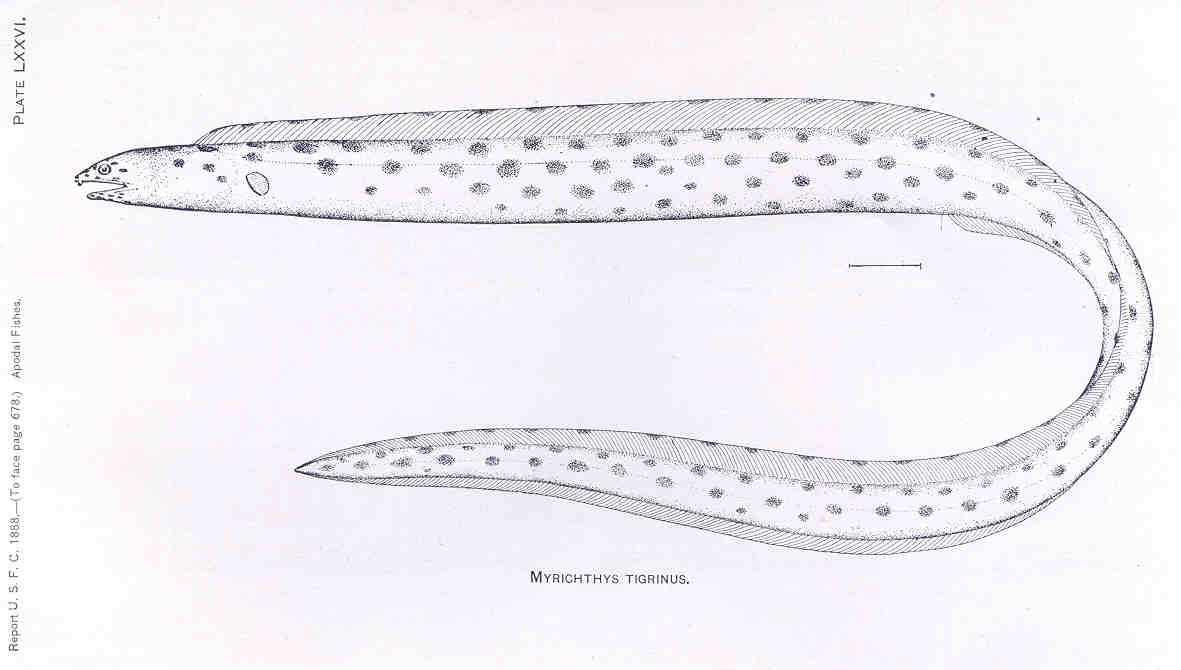

Conservation status
- Least Concern (IUCN 3.1)

Scientific classification
- Kingdom: Animalia
- Phylum: Chordata
- Class: Actinopterygii
- Order: Anguilliformes
- Family: Ophichthidae
- Genus: Myrichthys
- Species: M. tigrinus

Binomial name
- Myrichthys tigrinus Girard, 1859

= Myrichthys tigrinus =

Species of fish

The spotted snake eel (Myrichthys tigrinus), also known as the tiger snake eel or the spotted tiger snake eel, is an eel in the family Ophichthidae (worm/snake eels). It was described by Charles Frédéric Girard in 1859. It is a marine, tropical eel which is known from the eastern central and southeastern Pacific Ocean, including Chile, Costa Rica, Colombia, El Salvador, Ecuador, Mexico, Guatemala, Nicaragua, Panama, Honduras, and Peru. It dwells at a depth range of 0 to 60 metres (0 to 200 ft), and inhabits benthic sediments of mud and sand. Males can reach a maximum total length of 74 centimetres (29 in), but more commonly reach a TL of 60 centimetres (24 in).

The spotted snake-eel is of no commercial interest to fisheries. Due to its wide distribution in the eastern Pacific, its lack of known threats and lack of observed population decline, the IUCN redlist currently lists the species as Least Concern.
