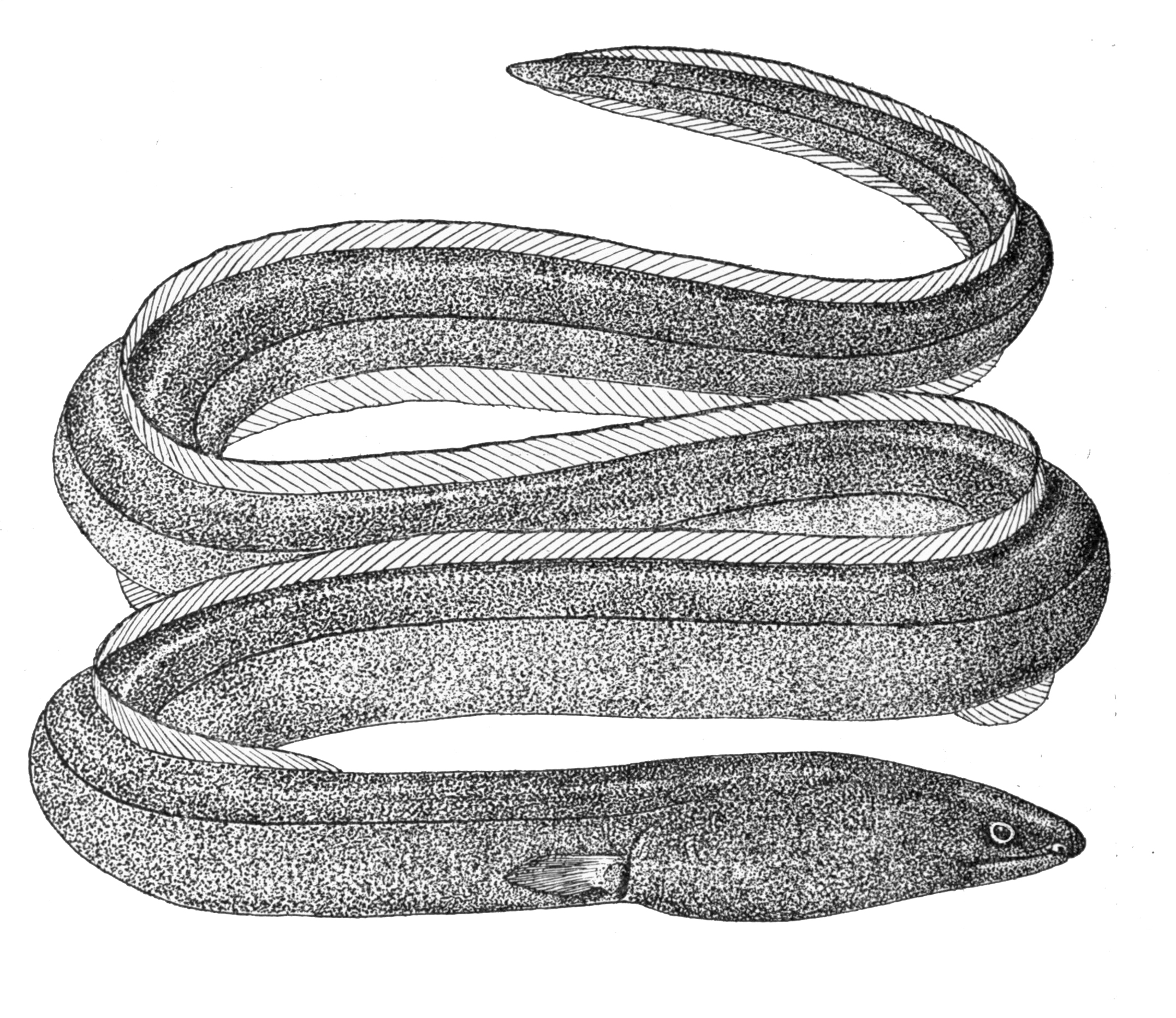

Scientific classification
- Kingdom: Animalia
- Phylum: Chordata
- Class: Actinopterygii
- Order: Anguilliformes
- Family: Ophichthidae
- Subfamily: Ophichthinae
- Genus: Pisodonophis; Kaup, 1856

Type species
- Ophisurus cancrivorus Richardson, 1848

Species
- See text

= Pisodonophis =

Genus of fishes

Pisodonophis is a genus of eels in the snake eel family Ophichthidae.

== Taxonomy ==
The genus Pisodonophis currently contains the following species:

- Pisodonophis boro (F. Hamilton, 1822) (rice-paddy eel)
- Pisodonophis cancrivorus (J. Richardson, 1848) (longfin snake-eel)
- Pisodonophis copelandi Herre, 1953
- Pisodonophis daspilotus C. H. Gilbert, 1898 (marble-toothed snake-eel)
- Pisodonophis hijala (F. Hamilton, 1822)
- Pisodonophis hoeveni (Bleeker, 1853) (Hoeven's snake-eel)
- Pisodonophis hypselopterus (Bleeker, 1851)
- Pisodonophis retrodorsalis (D. Liu, W. Q. Tang & C. G. Zhang, 2010}
- Pisodonophis sangjuensis H. S. Ji & J. K. Kim, 2011 (Korean snake-eel)
- Pisodonophis semicinctus (J. Richardson, 1848)
