= Clarion (accessible musical instrument) =

Accessible musical instrument for disabled musicians

The Clarion is an accessible electronic musical instrument developed by the UK-based charity Open Up Music.

== Description ==
The Clarion has been designed for disabled musicians who face difficulties bowing, plucking or blowing traditional acoustic instruments, or who find the shape or size of instruments a barrier to performing on them. It can be played with various parts of the body, including eye movement. It is the first digital instrument to be recognized by the examination board ABRSM.

== History ==
The origins of the Clarion go back to the MUSE Project, a community interest company founded in 2007 by Barry Farrimond-Chuong and Dr Duncan Gillard. The aim was to create an accessible instrument for performing musicians that was affordable, accessible (easy to set up and with an adaptive layout) and expressive. Early prototypes were developed with help from Cardiff Metropolitan University, Cariad Interactive and three special schools, utilizing technology including smartphones and tablets, brain activity sensors, eye-gaze tracking and 3D motion capture. Following additional funding from Youth Music and the Nominet Trust the first version of the Clarion was officially launched and introduced into schools in August 2016.

Farrimond-Chuong and Doug Bott relaunched MUSE Project as the charity Open Up Music in 2016. Since then, the Clarion has evolved through continued development by Farrimond-Chuong and software developer Paul Masri-Stone, shaped by co-design work with disabled musicians. In 2024 ABRSM announced the integration of the Clarion into its informal (non-examined) Open Music Assessment scheme. Open Up Music is now working to make the Clarion more widely available through educators and music therapists, using subscriptions and licensing.

== Technology ==
The Clarion uses a tablet or a personal computer to present customizable visual shapes on screen for users to interact with. These can be varied by shape, size, colour or placement and used to control pitch (by triggering different shapes), volume (controlled by position), or expressive elements such as vibrato (achieved through movement). Instead of traditional keys, valves, or strings, the Clarion can be played using a wide range of assistive technologies. These include joysticks, trackpads, gyroscopic devices, eye-gaze trackers, head sensors, and touch or mouse input. This allows players to choose the access method that best suits their physical movement.

The interface presents graphic scores instead of standard notation, enabling intuitive play for those who don't read music. Pre-loaded digital scores in the form of "patterns" are included for use with well-known pieces, for developing skills in new players. Examples range from Happy Birthday and Amazing Grace to contemporary pieces such as Laura Shigihara’s Grasswalk and Judith Weir’s Magic.

The Clarion's sound engine can emulate traditional instruments such as flutes and strings, as well as synthesised sounds. Users can customise pitch, expression, and timbre, allowing for a wide range of musical styles.

== Adoption and repertoire ==
Open Up Music has helped establish over 60 Open Orchestras in special schools across the UK. In 2018 it also founded the National Open Youth Orchestra (NOYO), an inclusive, disabled-led orchestra for young (11–25 years) musicians, which operates five regional ensembles. Many of these ensembles are led by musicians trained on the Clarion and teaching it to their students. Open Up provides regular training sessions to support this work.

As a co-commission with the Bournemouth Symphony Orchestra, NOYO premiered What Fear We Then by Alexander Campkin in 2022 in London, with repeat performances in Bristol, Poole and Birmingham. The piece was inspired by the composer's journey between non-disability and disability and written for a mix of acoustic and electronic instruments, including the Clarion. ABRSM commissioned Soaring Through Sparks by Michael Betteridge, which was premiered in 2024 with Alessandro Vazzana as the soloist. Vazzana, who plays with head movement using a Quha Zono head mouse, started playing the Clarion at his special school and now performs with the Alton Concert Orchestra.

Other new pieces have been commissioned for the Clarion Trio (Clarion, horn and piano), formed in 2024. These include Spiring by Louise Drewett, Clarion Call by Chris Gardner, Night Train by Allie Robertson, I Love You! by Alexandra Skevington and The Road Ahead by Frederick Viner.

== Awards ==
- 2015 - One Handed Musical Instrument Competition - Winner in the concept category
- 2017 - One Handed Musical Instrument Competition - Special Innovation Award
- 2020 - AbilityNet Tech 4 Good Awards - Winner Accessibility Award
