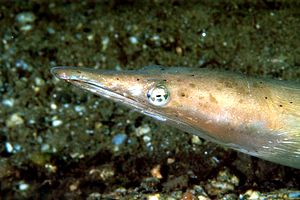
- Ophisurus serpens

Scientific classification
- Kingdom: Animalia
- Phylum: Chordata
- Class: Actinopterygii
- Division: Teleostei
- Order: Anguilliformes
- Family: Ophichthidae
- Subfamily: Ophichthinae
- Genus: Ophisurus; Lacépède, 1800

Type species
- Muraena serpens Linnaeus, 1758

Species
- See text.

= Ophisurus =

Genus of fishes

Ophisurus is a genus of eels in the snake eel family Ophichthidae. It currently contains the following species:

- Ophisurus macrorhynchos Bleeker, 1853
- Ophisurus serpens (Linnaeus, 1758) (Serpent eel)
