= Creagrutus zephyrus =

Conservation status
- Least Concern (IUCN 3.1)

Scientific classification
- Kingdom: Animalia
- Phylum: Chordata
- Class: Actinopterygii
- Order: Characiformes
- Family: Stevardiidae
- Genus: Creagrutus
- Species: C. zephyrus

Binomial name
- Creagrutus zephyrus Vari & Harold, 2001

Species of fish

Creagrutus zephyrus is a species of freshwater ray-finned fish, a characin, belonging to the family Stevardiidae.

== Distribution ==
It is native to South America, occurring in the central and upper portions of the Negro River. The Negro River is one of the largest tributaries of the Amazon, draining vast areas of southern Venezuela, Colombia, and northwestern Brazil before joining the Amazon near Manaus. Its waters are characterized by their dark coloration, resulting from dissolved organic matter leached from surrounding forests, and it flows through extensive tracts of rainforest that harbor exceptional biodiversity. The upper and central reaches of the basin encompass a mosaic of habitats, including blackwater streams, floodplain lakes, and seasonally inundated forests. This region is recognized as a critical component of the Amazon basin, serving as both a biogeographic corridor and a center of endemism. The species’ occurrence in these reaches underscores its ecological role within one of the most diverse and hydrologically complex freshwater systems in the world.

== Size ==
This species reaches a length of 4.0 cm (1.6 in).

== Etymology ==
The species name derives from the Latin term for ‘west wind,’ in reference to its distribution in the western portion of a range that also includes the closely related Creagrutus melanzonus and Creagrutus xiphos.
