= Tyttocharax metae =

Conservation status
- Vulnerable (IUCN 3.1)

Scientific classification
- Kingdom: Animalia
- Phylum: Chordata
- Class: Actinopterygii
- Order: Characiformes
- Family: Stevardiidae
- Genus: Tyttocharax
- Species: T. metae

Binomial name
- Tyttocharax metae Román-Valencia, García-Alzate, Ruiz-C. & Taphorn, 2012

Species of fish

Tyttocharax metae is a small species of freshwater ray-finned fish belonging to the family Stevardiidae. This fish is found in the Güejar river system of the Orinoco Basin in Colombia. It was discovered in the Columbian municipality of Vista Hermosa in 2009, and was formally described in 2012 by Román-Valencia, García-Alzate, Ruiz-C. & Taphorn.

== Etymology ==
T. metae was named for the Meta Department of Colombia where it was first discovered.

== Description ==
Males of T. metae reach an average standard length of 1.39 ± 0.13 cm (0.54 ± 0.05 in), while females reach a similar length of 1.4 ± 1.0 cm (0.55 ± 0.04 in), with a maximum standard length of approximately 1.86 cm (0.73 in).

It is colored a greenish-yellow in the dorsal sides of the head, body, and post-ventral portions of the body, with a blue stripe running down the side of the body, with a notable absence of dark coloration. T. metae lacks any distinction of coloration between sexes, unlike the related T. tambopatensis.

It is most notably distinguished from other species of Tyttocharax by the presence of bony hooks on the caudal and pectoral fin rays, and distinguished from T. madeirae and T. cochui by its absence of an adipose fin and by the bony hooks of its anal fins being longer than those on its pelvic fins, rather than being the same size.

== Distribution ==
T. metae has only been found in the Güejar river system of the Orinoco Basin in Colombia. It is found in fast-running streams with high dissolved oxygen content.
