= Landonia =

Conservation status
- Near Threatened (IUCN 3.1)

Scientific classification
- Kingdom: Animalia
- Phylum: Chordata
- Class: Actinopterygii
- Order: Characiformes
- Family: Stevardiidae
- Subfamily: Landoninae
- Genus: Landonia; C. H. Eigenmann & Henn, 1914
- Species: L. latidens

Binomial name
- Landonia latidens C. H. Eigenmann & Henn, 1914

Monotypic genus of fish

Landonia is a monospecific genus of freshwater ray-finned fish belonging to the family Stevardiidae. The only species in the genus is Landonia latidens, which is endemic to Ecuador, where it occurs in the Vinces River.
