= Creagrutus meridionalis =

Scientific classification
- Kingdom: Animalia
- Phylum: Chordata
- Class: Actinopterygii
- Order: Characiformes
- Family: Stevardiidae
- Genus: Creagrutus
- Species: C. meridionalis

Binomial name
- Creagrutus meridionalis Vari & Harold, 2001

Species of fish

Creagrutus meridionalis is a species of freshwater ray-finned fish, a characin, belonging to the family Stevardiidae.

== Location ==
It is native to South America, occurring in the upper Paraguay River basin in Mato Grosso, Brazil, and in eastern tributaries of the Paraguay River in Paraguay. These waters form part of the greater La Plata drainage system, one of the largest river basins in the world. The Paraguay River itself is a major tributary of the Paraná River, and its basin encompasses diverse habitats ranging from Pantanal wetlands to subtropical forests. The species' presence in both Brazilian and Paraguayan portions of the basin underscores its role within the interconnected ecosystems of the La Plata watershed.

== Size ==
This species reaches a length of 11.0 cm (4.3 in).

== Etymology ==
The species name derives from the Latin word for 'southern,' referring to its occurrence in the southern part of the range of Creagrutus.
