= Creagrutus britskii =

Scientific classification
- Kingdom: Animalia
- Phylum: Chordata
- Class: Actinopterygii
- Order: Characiformes
- Family: Stevardiidae
- Genus: Creagrutus
- Species: C. britskii

Binomial name
- Creagrutus britskii Vari & Harold, 2001

Species of fish

Creagrutus britskii is a species of freshwater ray-finned fish, a characin, belonging to the family Stevardiidae.

== Location ==
It is found in the upper Tocantins River basin in South America.

== Size ==
This species reaches a length of 5.3 cm (2.1 in).

== Etymology ==
The fish is named in honor of Brazilian ichthyologist Heraldo A. Britski, of the Universidade de São Paulo, because of his many contributions to the understanding of South American freshwater fishes.
