= Creagrutus atratus =

Conservation status
- Vulnerable (IUCN 3.1)

Scientific classification
- Kingdom: Animalia
- Phylum: Chordata
- Class: Actinopterygii
- Order: Characiformes
- Family: Stevardiidae
- Genus: Creagrutus
- Species: C. atratus

Binomial name
- Creagrutus atratus Vari & Harold, 2001

Species of fish

Creagrutus atratus is a species of freshwater ray-finned fish, a characin, belonging to the family Stevardiidae.

It is found in the Orinoco basin in the western part.

This species reaches a length of 7.0 cm (2.8 in).

The fish's name means "dressed in black" in Latin, probably referring to the dark coloration of type series and many of the other available specimens.
