= Creagrutus holmi =

Scientific classification
- Kingdom: Animalia
- Phylum: Chordata
- Class: Actinopterygii
- Order: Characiformes
- Family: Stevardiidae
- Genus: Creagrutus
- Species: C. holmi

Binomial name
- Creagrutus holmi Vari & Harold, 2001

Species of fish

Creagrutus holmi is a species of freshwater ray-finned fish, a characin, belonging to the family Stevardiidae.

== Location ==
It is native to South America, occurring in the Marañón River basin above the Pongo de Manseriche in northeastern Peru.

== Size ==
This species reaches a length of 9.2 cm (3.6 in).

== Etymology ==
The species is named in honor of Canadian ichthyologist Erling Holm (born 1950) of the Royal Ontario Museum in Toronto, who collected part of the type series along with other Creagrutus species and provided valuable assistance to the authors in this and related studies.
