= Creagrutus barrigai =

Scientific classification
- Kingdom: Animalia
- Phylum: Chordata
- Class: Actinopterygii
- Order: Characiformes
- Family: Stevardiidae
- Genus: Creagrutus
- Species: C. barrigai

Binomial name
- Creagrutus barrigai Vari & Harold, 2001

Species of fish

Creagrutus barrigai is a species of freshwater ray-finned fish, a characin, belonging to the family Stevardiidae.

== Location ==
It is found in the western Amazon River basin in northeastern Ecuador, northeastern Peru, and western Brazil.

== Size ==
This species reaches a length of 5.3 cm (2.1 in).

== Etymology ==
The fish is named in honor of Dr Ramiro E Barriga Salazar, of the Universidad Politecnica in Quito, Ecuador, because of his many contributions to the knowledge of the freshwater fishes of Ecuador.
