= Phenacobrycon =

Conservation status
- Near Threatened (IUCN 3.1)

Scientific classification
- Kingdom: Animalia
- Phylum: Chordata
- Class: Actinopterygii
- Order: Characiformes
- Family: Stevardiidae
- Subfamily: Landoninae
- Genus: Phenacobrycon; C. H. Eigenmann, 1922
- Species: P. henni

Binomial name
- Phenacobrycon henni (C. H. Eigenmann, 1914)

Synonyms
- Bryconamericus henni C. H. Eigenmann, 1914

Monotypic genus of fish

Phenacobrycon is a monospecific genus of freshwater ray-finned fish belonging to the family Stevardiidae. The only species in the genus is Phenacobrycon henni, which is endemic to Ecuador, where it is found in the Vinces River basin.
