= Creagrutus convencionensis =

Scientific classification
- Kingdom: Animalia
- Phylum: Chordata
- Class: Actinopterygii
- Order: Characiformes
- Family: Stevardiidae
- Genus: Creagrutus
- Species: C. convencionensis

Binomial name
- Creagrutus convencionensis Ardila Rodríguez, 2023

Species of fish

Creagrutus convencionensis is a species of freshwater ray-finned fish, a characin, belonging to the family Stevardiidae.

This species reaches a length of 1.4 cm (0.55 in). It is found in America.

The species name employs the Latin suffix –ensis, indicating place, in reference to the municipality of Convención in the Norte de Santander Department of Colombia, where the type locality—Quebrada Guamal in the Río Catatumbo drainage—is located.
