= Xenurobrycon polyancistrus =

Conservation status
- Least Concern (IUCN 3.1)

Scientific classification
- Kingdom: Animalia
- Phylum: Chordata
- Class: Actinopterygii
- Order: Characiformes
- Family: Stevardiidae
- Genus: Xenurobrycon
- Species: X. polyancistrus

Binomial name
- Xenurobrycon polyancistrus Weitzman, 1987

Species of fish

Xenurobrycon polyancistrus is a species of freshwater ray-finned fish belonging to the family Stevardiidae. A freshwater fish, it is the smallest species of characin in its family and order. Adults can grow up to 1.4 cm (0.55 in) long.

== Distribution ==
This fish is found in the gallery forest pools adjacent to rivers in savannah areas of the Rio Mamore and Rio Isiboro drainages in Bolivia.

It is also found in the Río Madre de Dios basin in Peru.

== Discovery ==
It was found among a collection of fishes from Bolivia sent by Gerard Loubens of the Office de la Recherche Scientifique et Technique Outre-Mer, Laboratoire d'Ichthyologie de l'Universite de Trinidad, Estado Beni, Bolivia.
