= Creagrutus ignotus =

Scientific classification
- Kingdom: Animalia
- Phylum: Chordata
- Class: Actinopterygii
- Order: Characiformes
- Family: Stevardiidae
- Genus: Creagrutus
- Species: C. ignotus

Binomial name
- Creagrutus ignotus Vari & Harold, 2001

Species of fish

Creagrutus ignotus is a species of freshwater ray-finned fish, a characin, belonging to the family Stevardiidae.

== Location ==
It is native to South America, occurring in the upper Tapajós River basin.

== Size ==
This species reaches a length of 6.2 cm (2.4 in).

== Etymology ==
The species name is derived from Latin for 'unknown,' referring to the prior absence of any records of Creagrutus in the upper Rio Tapajós basin of central Brazil.
