= Creagrutus paralacus =

Conservation status
- Least Concern (IUCN 3.1)

Scientific classification
- Kingdom: Animalia
- Phylum: Chordata
- Class: Actinopterygii
- Division: Teleostei
- Order: Characiformes
- Family: Stevardiidae
- Genus: Creagrutus
- Species: C. paralacus

Binomial name
- Creagrutus paralacus & Harold & Vari, 1994

Species of fish

Creagrutus paralacus is a species of freshwater ray-finned fish, a characin, belonging to the family Stevardiidae.

== Distribution ==
It is native to South America, occurring in the southern and southeastern tributaries of Lake Maracaibo in Venezuela. Lake Maracaibo is one of the largest lakes on the continent and forms a distinctive brackish water system connected to the Caribbean Sea via the Gulf of Venezuela. Fed by numerous rivers descending from the Andes and surrounding lowlands, the lake and its tributaries sustain diverse aquatic habitats ranging from freshwater inflows to estuarine environments. The southern and southeastern tributaries, in particular, drain montane and piedmont regions, creating transitional zones that support high biodiversity and endemism. This hydrological network has long been recognized as both ecologically and economically significant, serving as a critical habitat for Neotropical fishes while also underpinning regional livelihoods. The species’ occurrence in these tributaries underscores its role within one of the most complex and biologically rich aquatic systems in northern South America.

== Size ==
This species reaches a length of 6.7 cm (2.6 in).

== Etymology ==
The species name derives from the Greek pará (παρά), meaning ‘beside’ or ‘near,’ and the Latin lacus, meaning ‘lake,’ in reference to its distribution in rivers adjacent to Lake Maracaibo, Venezuela.
