= Creagrutus machadoi =

Scientific classification
- Kingdom: Animalia
- Phylum: Chordata
- Class: Actinopterygii
- Order: Characiformes
- Family: Stevardiidae
- Genus: Creagrutus
- Species: C. machadoi

Binomial name
- Creagrutus machadoi Vari & Harold, 2001

Species of fish

Creagrutus machadoi is a species of freshwater ray-finned fish, a characin, belonging to the family Stevardiidae.

== Location ==
It is found in the Caura River basin of South America.

== Size ==
This species reaches a length of 4.5 cm (1.8 in).

== Etymology ==
The species is named in honor of Antonio Machado‑Allison (born 1945) of the Universidad Central de Venezuela, recognizing his laboratory and field assistance to the authors and his extensive contributions to the study of Neotropical fishes.
