= Phallobrycon adenacanthus =

Conservation status
- Least Concern (IUCN 3.1)

Scientific classification
- Kingdom: Animalia
- Phylum: Chordata
- Class: Actinopterygii
- Order: Characiformes
- Family: Stevardiidae
- Genus: Phallobrycon
- Species: P. adenacanthus

Binomial name
- Phallobrycon adenacanthus Menezes, K. M. Ferreira & Netto-Ferreira, 2009

Species of fish

Phallobrycon adenacanthus is a species of freshwater ray-finned fish, a characin, belonging to the family Stevardiidae. This fish is endemic to Brazil, where it is found in the Rio Xingu basin.
