= Creagrutus ardilai =

Scientific classification
- Kingdom: Animalia
- Phylum: Chordata
- Class: Actinopterygii
- Order: Characiformes
- Family: Stevardiidae
- Genus: Creagrutus
- Species: C. ardilai

Binomial name
- Creagrutus ardilai Ardila Rodríguez, 2021

Species of fish

Creagrutus ardilai is a species of freshwater ray-finned fish, a characin, belonging to the family Stevardiidae.

This species reaches a length of 1.4 cm (0.55 in). It is found in South America.

The species was named in tribute to Ardila Rodríguez's late brother, Rodolfo Ardila Rodríguez, who joined him on ichthyological expeditions across the rivers and streams of Colombia and Venezuela and who collected the holotype in 2001.
