= Creagrutus figueiredoi =

Scientific classification
- Kingdom: Animalia
- Phylum: Chordata
- Class: Actinopterygii
- Order: Characiformes
- Family: Stevardiidae
- Genus: Creagrutus
- Species: C. figueiredoi

Binomial name
- Creagrutus figueiredoi Vari & Harold, 2001

Species of fish

Creagrutus figueiredoi is a species of freshwater ray-finned fish, a characin, belonging to the family Stevardiidae.

== Location ==
It is native to South America, occurring in the Tocantins River drainage, including both the upper Tocantins and Araguaia River basins

== Size ==
This species reaches a length of 6.3 cm (2.5 in).

== Etymology ==
The species is named in honor of José Lima de Figueiredo (born 1943) of the Museu de Zoologia, Universidade de São Paulo, recognizing his contributions to South American ichthyology and his long‑standing support to the senior author.
