= Creagrutus andaki =

Scientific classification
- Kingdom: Animalia
- Phylum: Chordata
- Class: Actinopterygii
- Order: Characiformes
- Family: Stevardiidae
- Genus: Creagrutus
- Species: C. andaki

Binomial name
- Creagrutus andaki Albornoz-Garzón, Acosta-Santos, Bogatá-Gregory & Agudelo-Córdoba, 2020

Species of fish

Creagrutus andaki is a species of tiny freshwater ray-finned fish, a characin, belonging to the family Stevardiidae.

The is found in the Upper Río Caquetá basin of Colombia, South America, and is named after the Indigenous peoples of the area, the Andaquí (also Andakí).

This species reaches a length of 1.4 cm (0.55 in).
