= Creagrutus magoi =

Scientific classification
- Kingdom: Animalia
- Phylum: Chordata
- Class: Actinopterygii
- Order: Characiformes
- Family: Stevardiidae
- Genus: Creagrutus
- Species: C. magoi

Binomial name
- Creagrutus magoi Vari & Harold, 2001

Species of fish

Creagrutus magoi is a species of freshwater ray-finned fish, a characin, belonging to the family Stevardiidae.

== Location ==
It is native to South America, occurring in the Chaviripa and Parguaza River basins, which are right‑bank tributaries of the Orinoco River.

== Size ==
This species reaches a length of 6.5 cm (2.6 in).

== Etymology ==
The species is named in honor of Francisco Mago Leccia (1931–2004) of the Universidad Central de Venezuela, in recognition of his significant contributions to the study of South American freshwater fishes and his long‑standing assistance to the senior author.
