= Creagrutus crenatus =

Scientific classification
- Kingdom: Animalia
- Phylum: Chordata
- Class: Actinopterygii
- Order: Characiformes
- Family: Stevardiidae
- Genus: Creagrutus
- Species: C. crenatus

Binomial name
- Creagrutus crenatus Vari & Harold, 2001

Species of fish

Creagrutus crenatus is a species of freshwater ray-finned fish, a characin, belonging to the family Stevardiidae.

== Location ==
It is native to the upper Tocuyo River on the Caribbean versant of north‑central Venezuela, within South America.

== Size ==
This species reaches a length of 7.0 cm (2.8 in).

== Etymology ==
The species name derives from Latin, meaning 'notched' or 'bearing rounded projections,' a reference to the exposed posterior margins of many of its scales.
