= Creagrutus menezesi =

Scientific classification
- Kingdom: Animalia
- Phylum: Chordata
- Class: Actinopterygii
- Order: Characiformes
- Family: Stevardiidae
- Genus: Creagrutus
- Species: C. menezesi

Binomial name
- Creagrutus menezesi Vari & Harold, 2001

Species of fish

Creagrutus menezesi is a species of freshwater ray-finned fish, a characin, belonging to the family Stevardiidae.

== Location ==
It is native to South America, occurring in the Tocantins River basin and tentatively in the Branco and Negro rivers near the mouth of the Branco. These drainages form part of the vast Amazon basin, one of the most biodiverse freshwater systems in the world. The Tocantins basin lies in central Brazil, while the Branco and Negro rivers are major tributaries of the Amazon in northern Brazil, highlighting the species' presence across distinct ecological regions within the greater Amazonian watershed.

== Size ==
This species reaches a length of 7.5 cm (3.0 in).

== Etymology ==
The species is named in honor of Brazilian ichthyologist Naércio Aquino Menezes (born 1937), in recognition of his extensive contributions to the study of South American fishes and his long‑standing assistance to the senior author.
