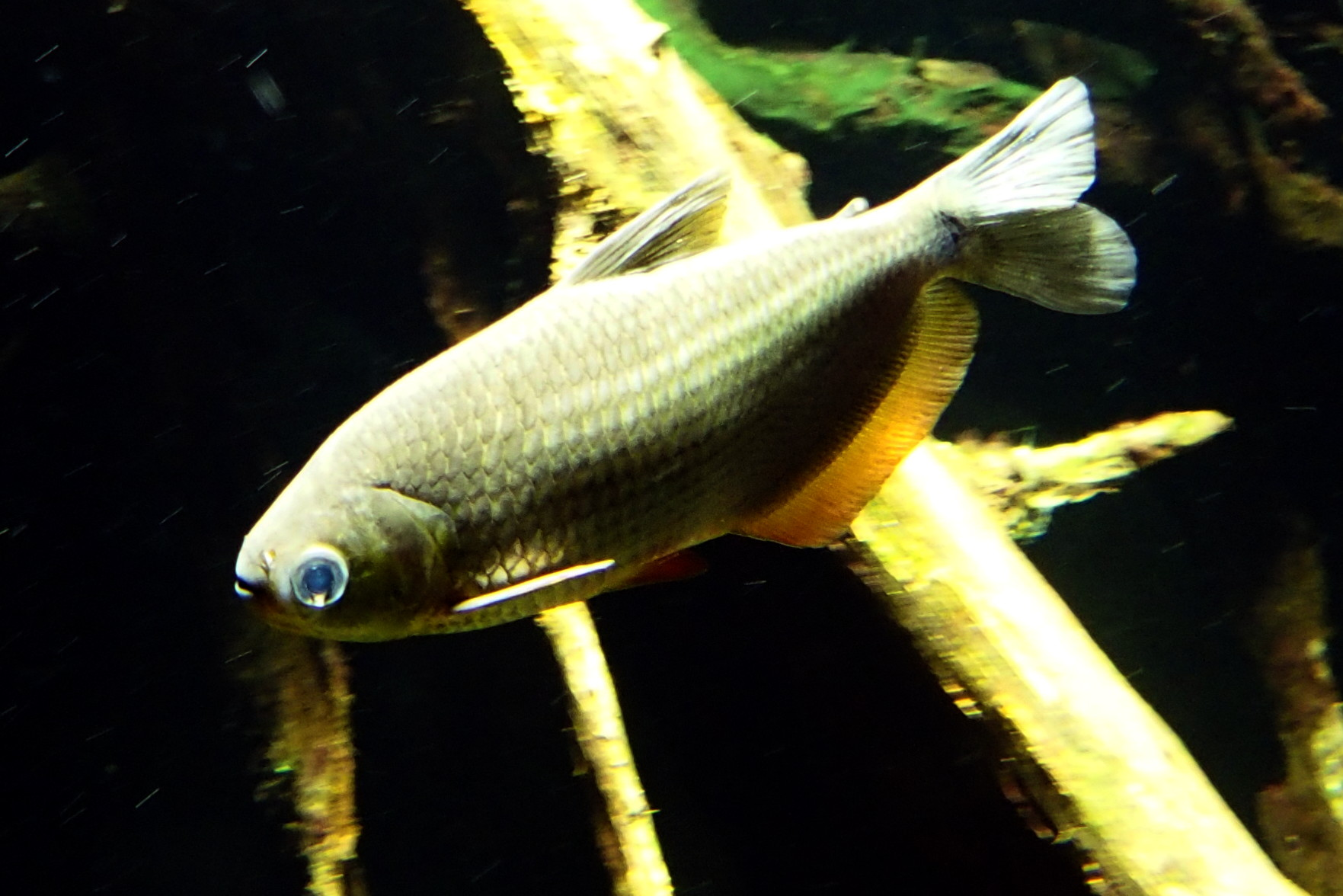
- Markiana nigripinnis

Scientific classification
- Kingdom: Animalia
- Phylum: Chordata
- Class: Actinopterygii
- Order: Characiformes
- Family: Stevardiidae
- Subfamily: Landoninae; Weitzman & Menezes, 1998

Type genus
- Landonia C. H. Eigenmann & Henn, 1914

= Landoninae =

Subfamily of fishes

Landoninae is a subfamily of freshwater ray-finned fishes belonging to the family Stevardiidae. The subfamily comprises genera which were previously classified in the family Characidae, but this was split into multiple families in 2024. They are found in South and Central America.

== Genera ==
Landoninae contains the following genera:

- Eretmobrycon Fink, 1976
- Landonia C. H. Eigenmann & Henn, 1914
- Markiana C. H. Eigenmann, 1903
- Phenacobrycon C. H. Eigenmann, 1922
