= Creagrutus manu =

Scientific classification
- Kingdom: Animalia
- Phylum: Chordata
- Class: Actinopterygii
- Order: Characiformes
- Family: Stevardiidae
- Genus: Creagrutus
- Species: C. manu

Binomial name
- Creagrutus manu Vari & Harold, 2001

Species of fish

Creagrutus manu is a species of freshwater ray-finned fish, a characin, belonging to the family Stevardiidae.

== Location ==
It is native to South America, occurring in the upper Manu River basin of southeastern Peru. This drainage forms part of the headwaters of the Amazon system and lies within the boundaries of Manu National Park, a UNESCO World Heritage Site renowned for its exceptional biodiversity. The species' presence in this region highlights the ecological richness of the Andean–Amazonian transition zone, where upland streams descend into lowland rainforest habitats.

== Size ==
This species reaches a length of 4.0 cm (1.6 in).

== Etymology ==
The species name refers to the Río Manu in southeastern Peru, its type locality, and to Manu National Park, where all examined specimens were collected.
