= Creagrutus tuyuka =

Conservation status
- Least Concern (IUCN 3.1)

Scientific classification
- Kingdom: Animalia
- Phylum: Chordata
- Class: Actinopterygii
- Order: Characiformes
- Family: Stevardiidae
- Genus: Creagrutus
- Species: C. tuyuka

Binomial name
- Creagrutus tuyuka Vari & F. C. T. Lima, 2003

Species of fish

Creagrutus tuyuka is a species of freshwater ray-finned fish, a characin, belonging to the family Stevardiidae.

== Distribution ==
It is native to South America, occurring in the Rio Uaupés basin of Brazil. The Uaupés is a major blackwater tributary of the Rio Negro, itself one of the principal tributaries of the Amazon River. Originating in the Guiana Shield and flowing through remote forested regions of northwestern Brazil and southeastern Colombia, the basin is characterized by nutrient‑poor, acidic waters and extensive floodplain habitats. These conditions foster unique ecological communities and high levels of endemism among Neotropical fishes. The occurrence of this species in the Uaupés underscores its adaptation to blackwater environments and situates it within one of the most biologically diverse and hydrologically significant sub‑basins of the Amazon system.

== Size ==
This species reaches a length of 6.8 cm (2.7 in).

== Etymology ==
The species name honors the Tuyuka people of the Colombia–Brazil border region, who have long carefully managed the subsistence fisheries of their territory and assisted the second author during the expedition that yielded the holotype.
