= Creagrutus lepidus =

Scientific classification
- Kingdom: Animalia
- Phylum: Chordata
- Class: Actinopterygii
- Division: Teleostei
- Order: Characiformes
- Family: Stevardiidae
- Genus: Creagrutus
- Species: C. lepidus

Binomial name
- Creagrutus lepidus Vari & Harold, Lasso & Machado-Allison, 1993 Vari & Harold, 2001

Species of fish

Creagrutus lepidus is a species of freshwater ray-finned fish, a characin, belonging to the family Stevardiidae.

== Location ==
It is native to South America, occurring in the Aroa and Urama River basins of the Caribbean versant drainage in Venezuela. These basins form part of the northern coastal watershed that flows directly into the Caribbean Sea, a region characterized by short, steep rivers descending from the coastal ranges. Seasonal rainfall patterns strongly influence their hydrology, producing alternating periods of high discharge and low flow that shape aquatic habitats. The Aroa and Urama rivers support diverse freshwater communities adapted to these dynamic conditions, including species with restricted distributions tied to coastal drainages. Their location along the Caribbean versant underscores the ecological distinctiveness of Venezuela’s northern river systems, which serve as important biogeographic links between inland waters and coastal marine environments.

== Size ==
This species reaches a length of 4.7 cm (1.9 in).

== Etymology ==
The species name is derived from Latin, meaning ‘pleasant,’ ‘agreeable,’ or ‘elegant,’ in reference to its distinctive pigmentation, notably the well‑developed dark midlateral stripe.
