= Creagrutus seductus =

Scientific classification
- Kingdom: Animalia
- Phylum: Chordata
- Class: Actinopterygii
- Order: Characiformes
- Family: Stevardiidae
- Genus: Creagrutus
- Species: C. seductus

Binomial name
- Creagrutus seductus Vari & Harold, 2001

Species of fish

Creagrutus seductus is a species of freshwater ray-finned fish, a characin, belonging to the family Stevardiidae.

== Location ==
It is native to South America, occurring in the upper Araguaia River basin in central Brazil. The Araguaia is one of the major tributaries of the Tocantins River, flowing through the states of Goiás, Mato Grosso, Tocantins, and Pará before joining the Tocantins on its course toward the Atlantic Ocean. Its basin encompasses diverse environments, including cerrado savannas, gallery forests, and extensive floodplain systems, which support a rich assemblage of aquatic and terrestrial biodiversity. The species' presence in the upper Araguaia highlights its role within the transitional zone between the Brazilian Shield and the Amazon basin, a region of significant ecological and hydrological importance.

== Size ==
This species reaches a length of 7.0 cm (2.8 in).

== Etymology ==
"The species name derives from the Latin word meaning 'remote' or 'apart,' in reference to the isolated location of its type locality relative to other sites where Creagrutus species occur.
