= Creagrutus ortegai =

Conservation status
- Least Concern (IUCN 3.1)

Scientific classification
- Kingdom: Animalia
- Phylum: Chordata
- Class: Actinopterygii
- Order: Characiformes
- Family: Stevardiidae
- Genus: Creagrutus
- Species: C. ortegai

Binomial name
- Creagrutus ortegai Vari & Harold, 2001

Species of fish

Creagrutus ortegai is a species of freshwater ray-finned fish, a characin, belonging to the family Stevardiidae.

== Distribution ==
It is native to South America, occurring in the Huallaga River basin and in the headwaters of the Aguaytía River, both located in central Peru. The Huallaga River is a major tributary of the Marañón, which together with the Ucayali forms the main stem of the Amazon. Flowing from the eastern slopes of the Andes into the lowland rainforest, the basin encompasses diverse habitats ranging from swift mountain streams to broad floodplain channels. The Aguaytía River, a tributary of the Ucayali, originates in the Andean foothills and contributes to the hydrological complexity of the upper Amazon system. These regions are recognized as biodiversity hotspots, supporting high levels of endemism and ecological diversity. The species’ occurrence in the Huallaga and Aguaytía underscores its role within the interconnected aquatic communities of the western Amazon basin.

== Size ==
This species reaches a length of 7.1 cm (2.8 in).

== Etymology ==
The species is named in honor of Peruvian ichthyologist Hernán Ortega, a colleague and co‑author on other studies, who collected nearly all known specimens and contributed extensively to the knowledge of Peru's freshwater fishes.
