= Creagrutus ephippiatus =

Scientific classification
- Kingdom: Animalia
- Phylum: Chordata
- Class: Actinopterygii
- Order: Characiformes
- Family: Stevardiidae
- Genus: Creagrutus
- Species: C. ephippiatus

Binomial name
- Creagrutus ephippiatus Vari & Harold, 2001

Species of fish

Creagrutus ephippiatus is a species of freshwater ray-finned fish, a characin, belonging to the family Stevardiidae.

== Location ==
It is native to South America, occurring in the Siapa River, a southern tributary of the Casiquiare River in the upper Negro River basin.

== Size ==
This species reaches a length of 5.8 cm (2.3 in).

== Etymology ==
The species name is derived from Latin for 'saddled,' in reference to the saddle‑like humeral markings that converge along the dorsal midline.
