= Attonitus bounites =

Conservation status
- Vulnerable (IUCN 3.1)

Scientific classification
- Kingdom: Animalia
- Phylum: Chordata
- Class: Actinopterygii
- Order: Characiformes
- Family: Stevardiidae
- Genus: Attonitus
- Species: A. bounites

Binomial name
- Attonitus bounites Vari & H. Ortega, 2000

Species of fish

Attonitus bounites is a species of freshwater ray-finned fish, a characin, belonging to the family Stevardiidae. They are only found in the Madre de Dios River drainage basin in Peru. They can grow to 5.7 cm (2.2 in) standard length.
