= Creagrutus hysginus =

Conservation status
- Vulnerable (IUCN 3.1)

Scientific classification
- Kingdom: Animalia
- Phylum: Chordata
- Class: Actinopterygii
- Order: Characiformes
- Family: Stevardiidae
- Genus: Creagrutus
- Species: C. hysginus

Binomial name
- Creagrutus hysginus Harold, Vari, Machado-Allison & Provenzano, 1994

Species of fish

Creagrutus hysginus is a species of freshwater ray-finned fish, a characin, belonging to the family Stevardiidae.

== Distribution ==
It is native to South America, occurring in rivers that drain into the Gulf of Paria in the states of Sucre and Monagas, northeastern Venezuela. The Gulf of Paria is a semi‑enclosed inland sea bordered by Venezuela and Trinidad, connected to the Caribbean through narrow straits. Its tributary rivers descend from the coastal ranges and lowland valleys of northeastern Venezuela, creating a dynamic freshwater–marine interface. These drainages sustain diverse aquatic habitats, including estuarine zones, mangroves, and floodplain systems, which support high biodiversity and provide critical nursery grounds for numerous fish species. The region is recognized as both ecologically and economically significant, serving as a corridor between continental river systems and coastal marine environments. The species’ occurrence in these tributaries highlights its role within one of the most distinctive hydrological and biogeographic settings of northern South America.

== Size ==
This the maximum length of the shell is 5.6 cm (2.2 in).

== Etymology ==
The species name derives from the Greek hýsginon (ὕσγινον), meaning ‘crimson’ or ‘scarlet dye,’ in reference to the distinctive coloration of its adipose fin.
