= Creagrutus veruina =

Scientific classification
- Kingdom: Animalia
- Phylum: Chordata
- Class: Actinopterygii
- Division: Teleostei
- Order: Characiformes
- Family: Stevardiidae
- Genus: Creagrutus
- Species: C. veruina

Binomial name
- Creagrutus veruina Vari & Harold, 2001

Species of fish

Creagrutus veruina is a species of freshwater ray-finned fish, a characin, belonging to the family Stevardiidae.

== Location ==
It is native to South America, occurring in the Cataniapo River basin, an east‑bank tributary of the middle Orinoco River in Venezuela. The Orinoco is one of the largest river systems on the continent, draining vast portions of Venezuela and Colombia before reaching the Atlantic Ocean. The Cataniapo basin lies within the state of Amazonas and contributes to the hydrological complexity of the Orinoco, supporting a mosaic of habitats ranging from upland forests to floodplain ecosystems. This region is recognized for its exceptional biodiversity, and the species' presence in the Cataniapo underscores its role within the interconnected aquatic communities of the Orinoco basin.

== Size ==
This species reaches a length of 4.5 cm (1.8 in).

== Etymology ==
The species name derives from the Latin term meaning 'small javelin,' in reference to its overall elongate form.
