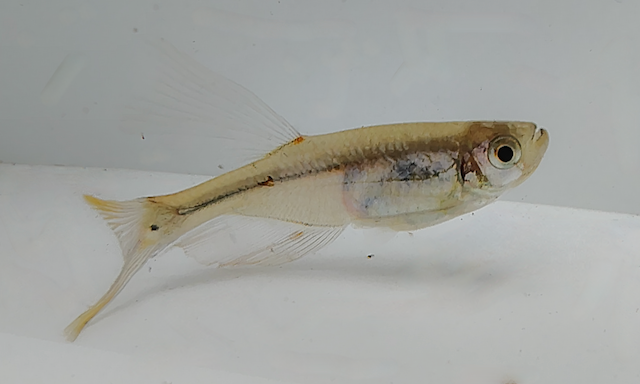

Conservation status
- Least Concern (IUCN 3.1)

Scientific classification
- Kingdom: Animalia
- Phylum: Chordata
- Class: Actinopterygii
- Division: Teleostei
- Order: Characiformes
- Family: Stevardiidae
- Subfamily: Stevardiinae
- Genus: Corynopoma; T. N. Gill, 1858
- Species: C. riisei

Binomial name
- Corynopoma riisei T. N. Gill, 1858

Synonyms
- Genus: Nematopoma T. N. Gill, 1858; Stavardia T. N. Gill, 1858; Species: Stevardia albipinnis T. N. Gill, 1858; Corynopoma riisei T. N. Gill, 1858; Corynopoma veedonii T. N. Gill, 1858; Nematopoma searlesii T. N. Gill, 1858; Stevardia aliata C. H. Eigenmann, 1914

= Corynopoma =

Species of fish

Corynopoma is a monospecific genus of freshwater ray-finned fish belonging to the family Stevardiidae. The only species in the genus is Corynopoma riisei, the sword-tail characin, a species of characin found in Colombia, Trinidad and Tobago and Venezuela.

== Taxonomy ==
Corynopoma was first proposed as a genus in 1858 by the American biologist Theodore Gill when he described Corynopoma riisei. The type locality of C. riisei was given as Trinidad in Trinidad and Tobago. Gill named a number of species in the same publication, including species he classified in the genera Nematopoma and Stevardia; these are now regarded as synonyms of Corynopoma. However, Gill proposed a new subfamily he called Stevardianae, with Stevardia as its type genus, and thus this taxon is the type genus of the subfamily Stevardiinae. The family Stevardiidae is in the suborder Characoidei of the order Characiformes.

== Mating system ==
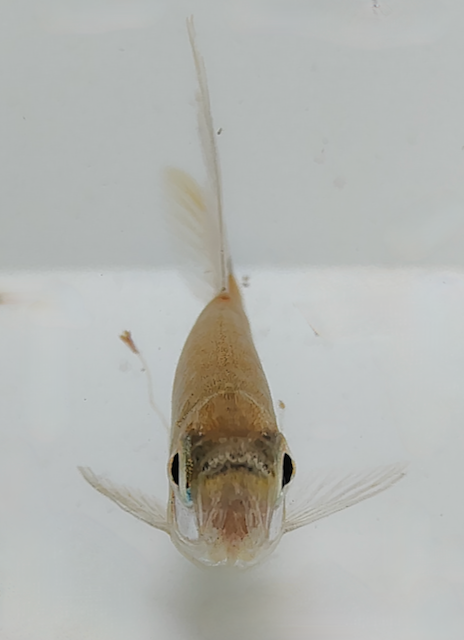
Male Corynopoma showing damaged and regrown flag ornaments

Corynopoma riisei have pronounced sexual dimorphism, the females being more aggressive and dominant than males. Males have a grey-black, flag-like ornament that extends from the operculum on each side of the body. This flag is normally held close to the body, but when trying to mate a male will extend the ornament and wave it in front of a female. During courtship the flag is displayed by the males one at a time and at a right angle from its body. They will perform both ornament displays and zigzags. Courtship may extend over several days in swordtail characin. The flag-like ornament is used as a food mimic to attract females. The females will try to bite at the ornament, which is then often damaged during courtship and can take weeks to regenerate. Studies have shown that unfed females respond more to the male ornament and show a preference for the larger flags than those that have been fed.

This is an example of sensory exploitation because the males are exploiting the females' pre-existing bias to seem more attractive, and have more opportunities to mate. Males lack external gonopodia, so in order for internal fertilization to occur in the female, they need to be within close proximity for the sperm to transfer successfully. The males use this food mimic to get them within close proximity of females, and will show different ornament displays based on the attractiveness of their ornaments. Males that do not show an overall large ornament size or symmetry can compensate by displaying or zigzagging their flags more often. The males may also use the hooks on the anal fin to direct the sperm for transfer.

Females store viable sperm internally for up to ten months, and will mate with multiple different males in their lifetime. These females would be receiving indirect benefits for the offspring as they are not directly choosing which males they want to be inseminated by but are selecting a food-mimic which can be related to male attractiveness. This attractive quality could then be passed on to offspring.

This species could also be used as an example of sensory drive: males are shown to have morphological differences based on their location and prey available, and females prefer the males whose flag ornament best resembles prey items of the population they live in. It has been demonstrated that the flag resembles an ant, because that is the most common natural prey of the swordtail characin. This plasticity in mate choice can also been shown in a laboratory setting: when food colour was altered, the females also changed the preference for males to have a flag that matches the colour of food.

Recently it has been hypothesized that the males' caudal pheromone gland is used to release pheromones that decrease stress in females and increase activity. This could potentially aid the males in gaining access to females and facilitating the sperm transfer.
