= Xenurobryconinae =

Scientific classification
- Kingdom: Animalia
- Phylum: Chordata
- Class: Actinopterygii
- Order: Characiformes
- Family: Stevardiidae
- Subfamily: Xenurobryconinae; Myers & Böhlke, 1956

Type genus
- Xenurobrycon Myers & P. Miranda Ribeiro, 1945

Subfamily of fishes

Xenurobryconinae is a subfamily of freshwater ray-finned fishes belonging to the family Stevardiidae. The subfamily comprises genera which were previously classified in the family Characidae, but this was split into multiple families in 2024. They are found in South and Central America.

== Genera ==
Xenurobryconinae contains the following genera:

- Iotabrycon Roberts, 1973
- Ptychocharax Weitzman, S. V. Fink, Machado-Allison & Royero, 1994
- Scopaeocharax Weitzman & S. V. Fink, 1985
- Tyttocharax Fowler, 1913
- Xenurobrycon Myers & P. Miranda Ribeiro, 1945
