= Planaltininae =

Scientific classification
- Kingdom: Animalia
- Phylum: Chordata
- Class: Actinopterygii
- Order: Characiformes
- Family: Stevardiidae
- Subfamily: Planaltininae; Oliveira & Souza, 2024

Type genus
- Planaltina Böhlke, 1954

Subfamily of fishes

Planaltininae is a subfamily of freshwater ray-finned fishes belonging to the family Stevardiidae. The subfamily comprises genera which were previously classified in the family Characidae, but this was split into multiple families in 2024. They are found in South and Central America.

== Genera ==
Planaltininae contains the following genera:

- Lepidocharax Ferreira, Menezes & Quagio-Grassiotto, 2011
- Palnaltina Böhlke, 1954
