= Creagrutus petilus =

Conservation status
- Least Concern (IUCN 3.1)

Scientific classification
- Kingdom: Animalia
- Phylum: Chordata
- Class: Actinopterygii
- Division: Teleostei
- Order: Characiformes
- Family: Stevardiidae
- Genus: Creagrutus
- Species: C. petilus

Binomial name
- Creagrutus petilus Vari & Harold, 2001

Species of fish

Creagrutus petilus is a species of freshwater ray-finned fish, a characin, belonging to the family Stevardiidae.

== Distribution ==
It is native to South America, occurring in the upper Machado River, a right‑bank tributary of the Madeira River. The Madeira is one of the largest tributaries of the Amazon, draining vast portions of Brazil, Bolivia, and Peru. The Machado basin lies in Rondônia, Brazil, and contributes to the hydrological complexity of the Madeira system, which is noted for its diverse habitats ranging from fast‑flowing upland streams to extensive floodplains. The species' presence in the Machado highlights its role within the interconnected ecosystems of the southwestern Amazon basin.

== Size ==
This species reaches a length of 4.9 cm (1.9 in).

== Etymology ==
The species name derives from the Latin word for 'thin' or 'slender,' in reference to its relatively elongate body form.
