= Iotabrycon =

Conservation status
- Near Threatened (IUCN 3.1)

Scientific classification
- Kingdom: Animalia
- Phylum: Chordata
- Class: Actinopterygii
- Order: Characiformes
- Family: Stevardiidae
- Subfamily: Xenurobryconinae
- Genus: Iotabrycon; T. R. Roberts, 1973
- Species: I. praecox

Binomial name
- Iotabrycon praecox T. R. Roberts, 1973

Genus of fishes

Iotabrycon is a monospecific genus of freshwater ray-finned fish belonging to the family Stevardiidae. The only species in the genus is Iotabrycon praecox, a fish which is endemic to Ecuador, where it is found in the Vinces River basin..
