= Creagrutus provenzanoi =

Scientific classification
- Kingdom: Animalia
- Phylum: Chordata
- Class: Actinopterygii
- Order: Characiformes
- Family: Stevardiidae
- Genus: Creagrutus
- Species: C. provenzanoi

Binomial name
- Creagrutus provenzanoi Vari & Harold, 2001

Species of fish

Creagrutus provenzanoi is a species of freshwater ray-finned fish, a characin, belonging to the family Stevardiidae.

== Location ==
It is native to South America, occurring in the Cataniapo River basin, a right‑bank tributary of the Orinoco River in Venezuela. The Orinoco is one of the largest river systems in South America, draining vast portions of Venezuela and Colombia before emptying into the Atlantic Ocean. The Cataniapo basin lies within the state of Amazonas and contributes to the hydrological complexity of the Orinoco, which supports diverse habitats ranging from upland forests to extensive floodplains. The species' presence in this tributary highlights its role within the interconnected ecosystems of the Orinoco basin, a region noted for its exceptional biodiversity and ecological importance.

== Size ==
This species reaches a length of 5.8 cm (2.3 in).

== Etymology ==
The species is named in honor of Francisco Provenzano R. of the Instituto de Zoología Tropical, Universidad Central de Venezuela, in recognition of his contributions to the study of Venezuelan fishes and his long‑standing assistance to the authors.
