= Monotocheirodon pearsoni =

Conservation status
- Least Concern (IUCN 3.1)

Scientific classification
- Kingdom: Animalia
- Phylum: Chordata
- Class: Actinopterygii
- Order: Characiformes
- Family: Stevardiidae
- Genus: Monotocheirodon
- Species: M. pearsoni

Binomial name
- Monotocheirodon pearsoni C. H. Eigenmann, 1924

Species of fish

Monotocheirodon pearsoni is a species of freshwater ray-finned fish, a characin, belonging to the family Stevardiidae. This fish is found in Bolivia, where it occurs in the Rio Beni basin, and Peru, in the Madre de Dios River system. This species can reach a length of 4.4 centimetres (1.7 in).
