= Creagrutus calai =

Scientific classification
- Kingdom: Animalia
- Phylum: Chordata
- Class: Actinopterygii
- Order: Characiformes
- Family: Stevardiidae
- Genus: Creagrutus
- Species: C. calai

Binomial name
- Creagrutus calai Vari & Harold, 2001

Synonyms
- see list

Species of fish

Creagrutus calai is a species of freshwater ray-finned fish, a characin, belonging to the family Stevardiidae.

== Location ==
It is found in the western Meta River basin in South America.

== Size ==
This species reaches a length of 6.6 cm (2.6 in).

== Etymology ==
The fish is named in honor of Plutarco Cala Cala, of the Universidad Nacional de Colombia, because of his contributions to the understanding of Colombian freshwater fishes.
