= Creagrutus cracentis =

Conservation status
- Least Concern (IUCN 3.1)

Scientific classification
- Kingdom: Animalia
- Phylum: Chordata
- Class: Actinopterygii
- Division: Teleostei
- Order: Characiformes
- Family: Stevardiidae
- Subfamily: Creagrutinae
- Genus: Creagrutus
- Species: C. cracentis

Binomial name
- Creagrutus cracentis Vari & Harold, 2001

Species of fish

Creagrutus cracentis is a species of freshwater fish in the family Stevardiidae. It is endemic to Brazil. It is a small characin, reaching up to 6 cm in length.

== Distribution ==
Creagrutus cracentis is found in the Tapajós and Xingu River basins, both tributaries of the Amazon River in Brazil.

== Description ==
This species is benthopelagic and inhabits tropical freshwater ecosystems. Maximum recorded size is 6.0 cm total length, with a maximum weight of 2.44 g.

== Conservation ==
The species is listed as Least Concern by the International Union for Conservation of Nature.
