= Creagrutus cimitarraensis =

Scientific classification
- Kingdom: Animalia
- Phylum: Chordata
- Class: Actinopterygii
- Order: Characiformes
- Family: Stevardiidae
- Genus: Creagrutus
- Species: C. cimitarraensis

Binomial name
- Creagrutus cimitarraensis Ardila Rodríguez, 2023

Species of fish

Creagrutus cimitarraensis is a species of freshwater ray-finned fish, a characin, belonging to the family Stevardiidae.

This species reaches a length of 1.4 cm (0.55 in). It is found in America.

The species name incorporates the Latin suffix –ensis, denoting place, in reference to the town of Cimitarra in the Departamento de Santander, Colombia, where the type locality—La Quitiana creek—is situated. The name reflects the meaning "beautiful", attributed to Cimitarra.
