= Creagrutus lassoi =

Scientific classification
- Kingdom: Animalia
- Phylum: Chordata
- Class: Actinopterygii
- Order: Characiformes
- Family: Stevardiidae
- Genus: Creagrutus
- Species: C. lassoi

Binomial name
- Creagrutus lassoi Vari & Harold, 2001

Species of fish

Creagrutus lassoi is a species of freshwater ray-finned fish, a characin, belonging to the family Stevardiidae.

== Location ==
It is native to South America, occurring in the Aroa and Yaracuy River basins within the Caribbean versant drainages of north‑central Venezuela.

== Size ==
This species reaches a length of 7.5 cm (3.0 in).

== Etymology ==
The species is named in honor of Venezuelan ichthyologist Carlos A. Lasso‑Alcalá of the Museo de Historia Natural La Salle in Caracas and the Asociación Amigos de Doñana in Seville, recognizing his contributions to the study of Venezuelan fishes and his assistance to the authors.
