= Eretmobrycon bayano =

Conservation status
- Vulnerable (IUCN 3.1)

Scientific classification
- Kingdom: Animalia
- Phylum: Chordata
- Class: Actinopterygii
- Order: Characiformes
- Family: Stevardiidae
- Genus: Eretmobrycon
- Species: E. bayano

Binomial name
- Eretmobrycon bayano Fink, 1976

Synonyms
- Bryconamericus bayano (Fink, 1976)

Species of fish

Eretmobrycon bayano is a species of freshwater ray-finned fish belonging to the family Stevardiidae. It was first described by William Lee Fink in 1976. This species is native to the Upper Bayano River basin in Central America.

== Size ==
This species reaches a length of 5.7 cm (2.2 in).

== Etymology ==
The fish is named for the upper Río Bayano basin, Panama, where it is endemic.

== Description ==
Eretmobrycon bayano is a small fish, reaching a maximum length of approximately 5.7 cm. It has a benthopelagic lifestyle, meaning it inhabits the bottom layers of freshwater environments.

== Habitat and distribution ==
This species is found in tropical freshwater environments. Its distribution is limited to the Upper Bayano River basin in Central America.

== Conservation status ==
Eretmobrycon bayano is currently listed as Vulnerable (VU) on the IUCN Red List due to habitat degradation and other environmental pressures.

== Ecology and behavior ==
Eretmobrycon bayano primarily feeds on small invertebrates and other aquatic organisms. It plays a role in the local ecosystem as both predator and prey.
