= Creagrutus kunturus =

Scientific classification
- Kingdom: Animalia
- Phylum: Chordata
- Class: Actinopterygii
- Division: Teleostei
- Order: Characiformes
- Family: Stevardiidae
- Genus: Creagrutus
- Species: C. kunturus

Binomial name
- Creagrutus kunturus Vari, Harold & Ortega, 1995

Species of fish

Creagrutus kunturus is a species of freshwater ray-finned fish, a characin, belonging to the family Stevardiidae.

== Location ==
It is native to South America, occurring in the upper Marañón River of northeastern Peru, as well as in the upper Pastaza River and the southwestern portion of the Napo River in southeastern Ecuador. The Marañón is one of the principal headwaters of the Amazon, descending from the Andes and contributing vast volumes of sediment and nutrients to the basin. The Pastaza River, originating in the Ecuadorian Andes, flows through diverse ecological zones ranging from montane forests to lowland floodplains, creating a mosaic of habitats that sustain high biodiversity. The Napo River, another major tributary of the Amazon, drains extensive areas of southeastern Ecuador and northern Peru, linking Andean watersheds with the lowland Amazon system. Together, these rivers form critical corridors for aquatic dispersal and genetic exchange, supporting rich assemblages of Neotropical fishes. The species’ distribution across these interconnected basins underscores its adaptation to varied hydrological regimes and situates it within one of the most ecologically significant regions of the western Amazon.

== Size ==
This species reaches a length of 9.6 cm (3.8 in).

== Etymology ==
The species name is a Latinization of kuntur, the Quechua word for ‘condor,’ referring to the Cordillera del Condor in Peru, the type region.
