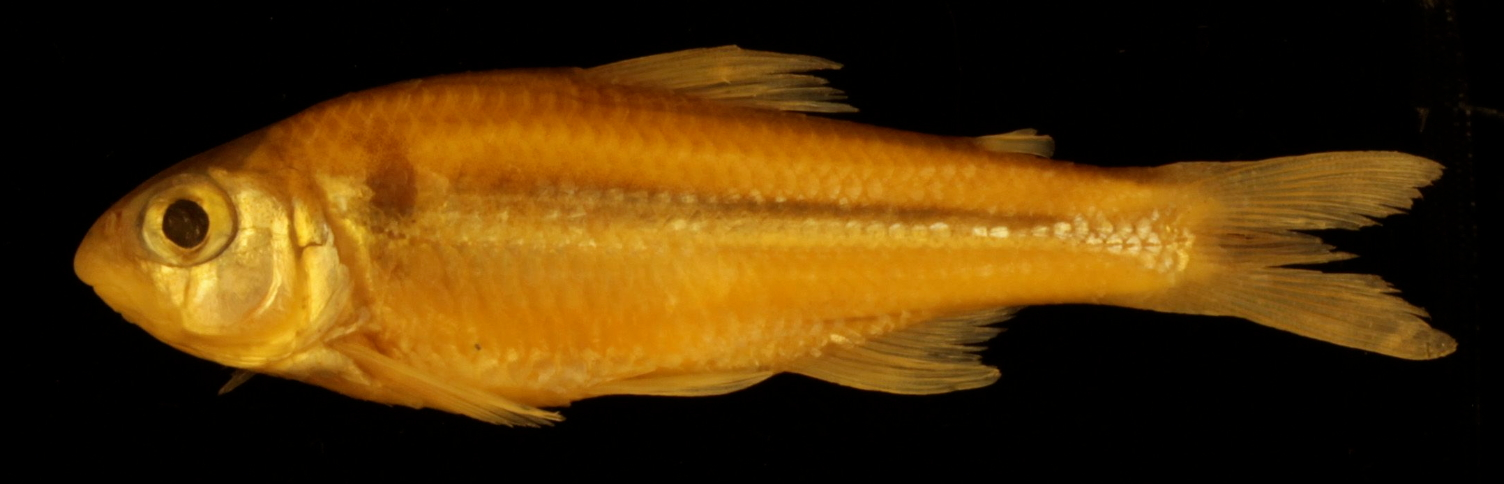
- Creagrutus changae (specimen at the Field Museum of Natural History)

Scientific classification
- Kingdom: Animalia
- Phylum: Chordata
- Class: Actinopterygii
- Order: Characiformes
- Family: Stevardiidae
- Genus: Creagrutus
- Species: C. changae

Binomial name
- Creagrutus changae Vari & Harold, 2001

= Creagrutus changae =

Species of fish

Creagrutus changae is a species of freshwater ray-finned fish, a characin, belonging to the family Stevardiidae.

== Location ==
It is found in the Americas, along the western tributaries of the Ucayali River in Junin, Pasco, and Huanuco, Peru.

== Size ==
This species reaches a length of 6.7 cm (2.6 in).

== Etymology ==
The fish is named in honor of the late Fonchii Chang (1963–1999), a Peruvian ichthyologist of Chinese and Japanese ancestry from the Museo de Historia Natural in Lima, Peru, recognized for her contributions to the study of Peruvian fishes and her support to the authors before her untimely passing. She tragically died with her motorista in a boat accident near Lake Rimachi, Peru; wearing rubber boots that filled with water and held her down, she was shocked by an electric eel, rendered unconscious, and drowned.
