= Creagrutus runa =

Scientific classification
- Kingdom: Animalia
- Phylum: Chordata
- Class: Actinopterygii
- Order: Characiformes
- Family: Stevardiidae
- Genus: Creagrutus
- Species: C. runa

Binomial name
- Creagrutus runa Vari & Harold, 2001

Species of fish

Creagrutus runa is a species of freshwater ray-finned fish, a characin, belonging to the family Stevardiidae.

== Location ==
It is native to South America, occurring in the upper Negro River basin. The Negro River is one of the largest tributaries of the Amazon, flowing through Colombia, Venezuela, and Brazil before joining the Solimões near Manaus to form the main Amazon channel. Its basin encompasses vast areas of tropical rainforest, blackwater systems, and floodplain habitats, noted for their exceptional biodiversity and ecological complexity. The species' presence in the upper Negro highlights its role within the diverse aquatic communities of the northwestern Amazon basin.

== Size ==
This species reaches a length of 6.3 cm (2.5 in).

== Etymology ==
The fish's name is Latin for "javelin" or "spear", referring to its elongate body form.
