= Creagrutus peruanus =

Conservation status
- Least Concern (IUCN 3.1)

Scientific classification
- Kingdom: Animalia
- Phylum: Chordata
- Class: Actinopterygii
- Order: Characiformes
- Family: Stevardiidae
- Genus: Creagrutus
- Species: C. peruanus

Binomial name
- Creagrutus peruanus (Steindachner, 1876)

Synonyms
- Piabina peruana Steindachner, 1876; Creagrutus nasutus Günther, 1876

Species of fish

Creagrutus peruanus is a species of freshwater ray-finned fish, a characin, belonging to the family Stevardiidae.

This species reaches a length of 8.7 cm (3.4 in). It is endemic to the Apurímac and Urubamba River basins in Peru, from which it receives its name.
