= Creagrutus mucipu =

Scientific classification
- Kingdom: Animalia
- Phylum: Chordata
- Class: Actinopterygii
- Order: Characiformes
- Family: Stevardiidae
- Genus: Creagrutus
- Species: C. mucipu

Binomial name
- Creagrutus mucipu Vari & Harold, 2001

Species of fish

Creagrutus mucipu is a species of freshwater ray-finned fish, a characin, belonging to the family Stevardiidae.

== Location ==
It is native to South America, occurring in the upper Tocantins River basin of central Brazil. The Tocantins is one of the country's major river systems, flowing northward to join the Pará River before reaching the Atlantic Ocean. Its basin encompasses diverse habitats, including cerrado savannas, gallery forests, and floodplain environments, forming part of the transitional zone between the Amazon and central Brazilian biomes. The species' presence in this drainage highlights its role within a region of high ecological diversity and hydrological importance.

== Size ==
This species reaches a length of 5.6 cm (2.2 in).

== Etymology ==
The species name is an acronym of Museu de Ciências e Tecnologia, PUCRS (Pontifícia Universidade Católica do Rio Grande do Sul), whose staff collected the holotype and assisted the authors in this and related projects.
