= Creagrutus affinis =

Conservation status
- Least Concern (IUCN 3.1)

Scientific classification
- Kingdom: Animalia
- Phylum: Chordata
- Class: Actinopterygii
- Order: Characiformes
- Family: Stevardiidae
- Genus: Creagrutus
- Species: C. affinis

Binomial name
- Creagrutus affinis Steindachner, 1880

Synonyms
- Creagrutus notropoides Meek & Hildebrand, 1912; Creagrutus simus Meek & Hildebrand, 1913; Creagrutus leuciscus Regan, 1913; Creagrutus londonoi Fowler, 1945

Species of fish

Creagrutus affinis is a species of freshwater ray-finned fish, a characin, belonging to the family Stevardiidae.

== Distribution ==
It is found in the Caribbean drainages of Colombia from the Magdalena River basin west to coastal basins of the Chocó Department, the Pacific slope rivers of Panama from Bayano to the Tuira River, the Chagres River system of Atlantic slope of Panama, and the Baudo and San Juan rivers of the Pacific slopes of Colombia.

== Size ==
This species reaches a length of 7.8 cm (3.1 in).

== Etymology ==
The fish's name means in Latin "related", as in very close if not identical to Creagrutus muelleri.
