= Creagrutus molinus =

Scientific classification
- Kingdom: Animalia
- Phylum: Chordata
- Class: Actinopterygii
- Order: Characiformes
- Family: Stevardiidae
- Genus: Creagrutus
- Species: C. molinus

Binomial name
- Creagrutus molinus Vari & Harold, 2001

Species of fish

Creagrutus molinus is a species of freshwater ray-finned fish, a characin, belonging to the family Stevardiidae.

== Location ==
It is native to South America, occurring in the upper Araguaia River basin of central Brazil. The Araguaia is a major tributary of the Tocantins River system, which ultimately drains into the Atlantic Ocean. This basin encompasses diverse habitats, including savanna floodplains and gallery forests, and forms part of the transitional zone between the Amazon and Cerrado biomes. The species' presence in this region highlights its role within one of Brazil's most ecologically significant watersheds.

== Size ==
This species reaches a length of 5.6 cm (2.2 in).

== Etymology ==
The species name derives from the Latin word for 'grinder,' referring to the large teeth present in both the upper and lower jaws.
