= Creagrutus ouranonastes =

Conservation status
- Least Concern (IUCN 3.1)

Scientific classification
- Kingdom: Animalia
- Phylum: Chordata
- Class: Actinopterygii
- Division: Teleostei
- Order: Characiformes
- Family: Stevardiidae
- Genus: Creagrutus
- Species: C. ouranonastes

Binomial name
- Creagrutus ouranonastes Vari & Harold, 2001

Species of fish

Creagrutus ouranonastes is a species of freshwater ray-finned fish, a characin, belonging to the family Stevardiidae.

== Distribution ==
It is native to South America, occurring in the upper Apurímac River basin of southern Peru. The Apurímac originates in the Andes at elevations exceeding 5,000 meters and is widely recognized as one of the principal headwaters of the Amazon River system. Flowing through steep canyons and montane valleys, the basin encompasses diverse habitats ranging from cold, fast‑flowing highland streams to transitional piedmont environments. This region is notable for its ecological complexity and high levels of endemism, serving as a critical link between Andean and Amazonian ecosystems. The species’ occurrence in the upper Apurímac underscores its role within one of the most hydrologically significant and biologically rich headwater regions of the Amazon basin.

== Size ==
This species reaches a length of 10.0 cm (3.9 in).

== Etymology ==
The species name derives from the Greek ouranós (οὐρανός), meaning ‘heaven’ or ‘sky,’ and nástes, from naétēs (ναέτης), meaning ‘dweller’ or ‘inhabitant,’ in reference to its habitat at an elevation of approximately 1,900 meters—the highest known for any member of the genus.
