= Creagrutus gyrospilus =

Scientific classification
- Kingdom: Animalia
- Phylum: Chordata
- Class: Actinopterygii
- Order: Characiformes
- Family: Stevardiidae
- Genus: Creagrutus
- Species: C. gyrospilus

Binomial name
- Creagrutus gyrospilus Vari & Harold, 2001

Species of fish

Creagrutus gyrospilus is a species of freshwater ray-finned fish, a characin, belonging to the family Stevardiidae.

== Location ==
It is native to South America, occurring in the western Orinoco River basin of Venezuela.

== Size ==
This species reaches a length of 6.2 cm (2.4 in).

== Etymology ==
The species name derives from the Greek gȳ́ros (γῦρος), meaning 'circle,' and spílos (σπίλος), meaning 'mark' or 'spot,' in reference to its rounded humeral spot, as opposed to a vertically elongate one.
