= Planaltina =

Planaltina may refer to:

== Geography ==
- Planaltina, Federal District, an administrative region in the Federal District, Brazil
- Planaltina, Goiás, a municipality in the state of Goiás (in the metropolitan region of Brasilia), Brazil
- Planaltina do Paraná, a municipality in the state of Paraná, Brazil

== Sport ==
- Planaltina Esporte Clube, a football club of the Federal District, Brazil

== Biology ==
- Planaltina (fish), a genus of characins endemic to Brazil
- Planaltina (plant), a genus of Rubiaceae endemic to Brazil
