= Creagrutus taphorni =

Scientific classification
- Kingdom: Animalia
- Phylum: Chordata
- Class: Actinopterygii
- Order: Characiformes
- Family: Stevardiidae
- Genus: Creagrutus
- Species: C. taphorni

Binomial name
- Creagrutus taphorni Vari & Harold, 2001

Synonyms
- see list

Species of fish

Creagrutus taphorni is a species of freshwater ray-finned fish, a characin, belonging to the family Stevardiidae.

== Location ==
It is native to South America, inhabiting piedmont streams of north‑central Venezuela, east of the Andean Cordilleras, primarily within the Orinoco and Tuy River basins of the Caribbean versant. The Orinoco River is one of the largest river systems in South America, draining vast portions of Venezuela and Colombia before reaching the Atlantic Ocean, and is renowned for its extraordinary biodiversity. The Tuy River, though smaller, flows through the central coastal region of Venezuela and contributes to the Caribbean drainage system. Together, these basins encompass a mosaic of habitats ranging from upland piedmont streams to lowland floodplains, supporting diverse aquatic communities. The species' presence in these tributaries underscores its ecological role within the interconnected river networks of northern Venezuela.

== Size ==
This species reaches a length of 7.4 cm (2.9 in).

== Etymology ==
The species is named in honor of American ichthyologist Donald C. Taphorn (b. 1951), who collected much of the type material and contributed significantly to the knowledge of fishes of the Llanos in the Orinoco basin, as well as providing long‑standing assistance to the authors in this and other projects.
