= Creagrutus cerritulus =

Scientific classification
- Kingdom: Animalia
- Phylum: Chordata
- Class: Actinopterygii
- Order: Characiformes
- Family: Stevardiidae
- Genus: Creagrutus
- Species: C. cerritulus

Binomial name
- Creagrutus cerritulus Netto-Ferreira & Vari, 2017

Species of fish

Creagrutus cerritulus is a species of freshwater ray-finned fish, a characin, belonging to the family Stevardiidae.

== Location ==
It is native to South America, occurring in the Río Cachiyacu, a tributary of the Río Huallaga within the Amazon basin of Peru. The Huallaga River is one of the principal Andean tributaries of the Amazon, descending from highland valleys through montane forests before joining the Marañón. Its basin encompasses a wide range of ecological zones, from cloud forests to lowland floodplains, supporting diverse aquatic communities. The Río Cachiyacu, as part of this network, contributes to the hydrological complexity of the region, with seasonal fluctuations in flow and water chemistry shaping local habitats. These conditions foster high biodiversity and endemism among Neotropical fishes. The species’ occurrence in the Cachiyacu highlights its adaptation to upland tributary environments and situates it within one of the most ecologically significant sub‑basins of the western Amazon system.

== Size ==
This species reaches a length of 5.1 cm (2.0 in).

== Etymology ==
The species name is derived from Latin, meaning ‘somewhat mad’ (interpreted by the authors as ‘strange’), in reference to its pronounced morphological modifications—including ventrally displaced jaws, compressed and spatulate dentition, and a reduced swim bladder—when compared both to its congeners and to other members of the Stevardiinae and even the broader Characidae.
