= Creagrutus saxatilis =

Scientific classification
- Kingdom: Animalia
- Phylum: Chordata
- Class: Actinopterygii
- Order: Characiformes
- Family: Stevardiidae
- Genus: Creagrutus
- Species: C. saxatilis

Binomial name
- Creagrutus saxatilis Vari & Harold, 2001

Species of fish

Creagrutus saxatilis is a species of freshwater ray-finned fish, a characin, belonging to the family Stevardiidae.

== Location ==
It is native to South America, occurring in the upper Tocantins River basin in Goiás and the Distrito Federal, Brazil. The Tocantins is one of the country's major river systems, flowing northward to join the Pará River before reaching the Atlantic Ocean. Its basin encompasses diverse environments, including cerrado savannas, gallery forests, and rocky riverine habitats, forming part of the transitional zone between central Brazil and the Amazon basin. The species' presence in this drainage highlights its role within a region of high ecological diversity and hydrological importance.

== Size ==
This species reaches a length of 8.2 cm (3.2 in).

== Etymology ==
The species name derives from the Latin phrase meaning 'a fish that frequents rocks,' in reference to the rocky substrate of its type locality.
