= Creagrutus occidaneus =

Conservation status
- Least Concern (IUCN 3.1)

Scientific classification
- Kingdom: Animalia
- Phylum: Chordata
- Class: Actinopterygii
- Order: Characiformes
- Family: Stevardiidae
- Genus: Creagrutus
- Species: C. occidaneus

Binomial name
- Creagrutus occidaneus Vari & Harold, 2001

Species of fish

Creagrutus occidaneus is a species of freshwater ray-finned fish, a characin, belonging to the family Stevardiidae.

== Distribution ==
It is native to South America, occurring in the foothills and lowlands of eastern Peru within the Manu River basin of the Department of Madre de Dios, and in the upper Purus River basin in Acre and Amazonas, Brazil, as well as the Department of Ucayali, Peru. Both the Manu and Purus drainages form part of the western Amazon basin, one of the most biodiverse freshwater systems on Earth. The Manu basin lies within the Andean–Amazon transition zone, noted for its exceptional ecological richness, while the Purus basin extends across Brazil and Peru, contributing to the vast network of tributaries that sustain the Amazon River. The species' distribution across these regions underscores its role within the interconnected habitats of the Amazon watershed.

== Size ==
This species reaches a length of 6.6 cm (2.6 in).

== Etymology ==
The species name derives from the Latin word for 'western,' referring to its distribution in the western lowlands of the Amazon basin.
