= Rhinopetitia myersi =

Conservation status
- Data Deficient (IUCN 3.1)

Scientific classification
- Kingdom: Animalia
- Phylum: Chordata
- Class: Actinopterygii
- Order: Characiformes
- Family: Stevardiidae
- Genus: Rhinopetitia
- Species: R. myersi

Binomial name
- Rhinopetitia myersi Géry, 1964

Species of fish

Rhinopetitia myersi is a species of freshwater ray-finned fish, a characin, belonging to the family Stevardiidae. This fish is endemic to Brazil, where it is found in the Rio Araguaia. This species can reach a length of 3 centimetres (1.2 in) SL.
