= Creagrutus guanes =

Conservation status
- Least Concern (IUCN 3.1)

Scientific classification
- Kingdom: Animalia
- Phylum: Chordata
- Class: Actinopterygii
- Order: Characiformes
- Family: Stevardiidae
- Genus: Creagrutus
- Species: C. guanes

Binomial name
- Creagrutus guanes Torres-Mejia & Vari, 2005

Species of fish

Creagrutus guanes is a species of freshwater ray-finned fish, a characin, belonging to the family Stevardiidae.

This species reaches a length of 7.3 cm (2.9 in). It is found in Colombia. The species name honors the Guanes, an Indigenous people who once inhabited the Río Fonce basin in Colombia (the type locality). The Guane people fiercely resisted the Spanish conquistadors, a struggle that ultimately led to their near‑complete extinction.
