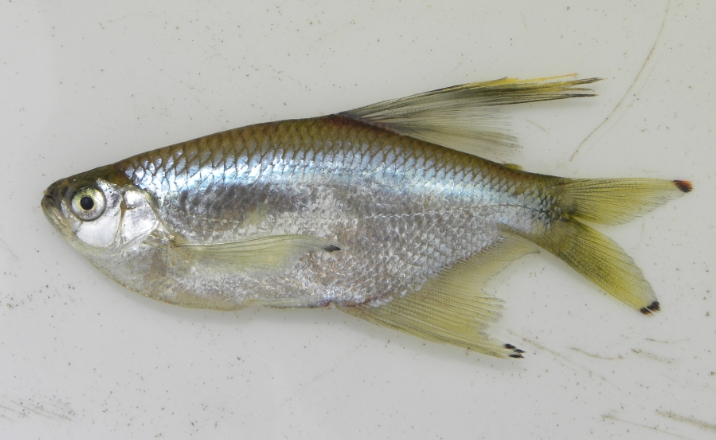

Conservation status
- Least Concern (IUCN 3.1)

Scientific classification
- Kingdom: Animalia
- Phylum: Chordata
- Class: Actinopterygii
- Order: Characiformes
- Family: Stevardiidae
- Genus: Pseudocorynopoma
- Species: P. doriae

Binomial name
- Pseudocorynopoma doriae Perugia, 1891

Synonyms
- Bergia altipinnis Steindachner, 1891; Chalcinopelecus argentinus Holmberg, 1891

= Pseudocorynopoma doriae =

Species of freshwater fish

Pseudocorynopoma doriae, or the dragonfin tetra, is a species of freshwater ray-finned fish, a characin, belonging to the family Stevardiidae. It is found in inland waters in South America.

== Taxonomy ==
Pseudocorynopoma doriae was first formally described in 1891 by the Italian ichthyologist Alberto Perugia, with its type locality given as the Río de la Plata. When he described this species, Pergia classified it in the genus Pseudocorynopoma, this taxon being the type species of that genus by monotypy. Subsequently, two more species have been classified in this genus, which is classified within the subfamily Stevardiinae of the family Stevardiidae. This family is in the suborder Characoidei of the order Characiformes.

== Description ==
Pseudocorynopoma doriae has an elongated, flattened body. The mouth is large, pointing upwards diagonally, with fine teeth. The eyes are large. The fins are large, with the exception of the pelvic fin. Both anal and dorsal fins when folded reach the root of the caudal plumage. The caudal fin is bilobate, with equal lobes. The basic coloration is brown with silvery reflections. Along the body runs a horizontal band, which, depending on the origin of the fish, may be cream, white or bluish-silver. There is also another black line running from the base of the dorsal fin to the caudal fin. The gills and ventral area are white. The fins are yellow-orange in color, but at the same time almost transparent. Males have large pectoral, dorsal and anal fins, while females' fins are of normal size. Their maximum size is 8 cm (3.1 in), in captive fish; otherwise, the maximum standard length is 6.3 cm (2.5 in).

== Distribution and habitat ==
Pseudocorynopoma doriae is found in the drainage systems of the Uruguay and Parana rivers in Argentina and Uruguay. This species prefers to be at depth of less than 1 m (3 ft 3 in) where there is a slow current in estuaries, marshes, inundated areas, lagoons, streams, canals and other small watercourses. They stay close to the shoreline, in and around vegetation, and avoid the main channels of rivers.

== Diet ==
The dragonfin tetra is an omnivorous fish, feeding mainly on small invertebrates such as water fleas, ringworms, small shrimp, insect larvae, and flying insects. Zooplankton is also part of their diet. The fish also eat algae, soft plant leaves, and the eggs of other fish.

== Sources ==
- https://housaqua.com/en/2563-pseudocorynopoma-doriae.html
- https://www.fishbase.se/summary/12398
