= Creagrutus ungulus =

Scientific classification
- Kingdom: Animalia
- Phylum: Chordata
- Class: Actinopterygii
- Order: Characiformes
- Family: Stevardiidae
- Genus: Creagrutus
- Species: C. ungulus

Binomial name
- Creagrutus ungulus Vari & Harold, 2001

Species of fish

Creagrutus ungulus is a species of freshwater ray-finned fish, a characin, belonging to the family Stevardiidae.

== Location ==
It is native to South America, occurring in the Madre de Dios River basin of southeastern Peru. The Madre de Dios is a major tributary of the Madeira River, itself one of the largest contributors to the Amazon system. Flowing through the foothills of the Andes into the lowland rainforest, the basin encompasses diverse habitats ranging from fast‑flowing piedmont streams to extensive floodplain forests. This region is internationally recognized as a biodiversity hotspot, supporting exceptional aquatic and terrestrial communities. The species' presence in the Madre de Dios basin underscores its role within the complex ecological networks of the southwestern Amazon.

== Size ==
This species reaches a length of 10.9 cm (4.3 in).

== Etymology ==
The species name derives from the Latin word meaning 'ring,' in reference to the narrow ring of infraorbitals bordering the ventral and posterior margins of the orbit.
