= Creagrutus pila =

Conservation status
- Least Concern (IUCN 3.1)

Scientific classification
- Kingdom: Animalia
- Phylum: Chordata
- Class: Actinopterygii
- Division: Teleostei
- Order: Characiformes
- Family: Stevardiidae
- Genus: Creagrutus
- Species: C. pila

Binomial name
- Creagrutus pila Vari & Harold, 2001

Species of fish

Creagrutus pila is a species of freshwater ray-finned fish, a characin, belonging to the family Stevardiidae.

== Distribution ==
It is native to South America, occurring in smaller rivers that drain into the Aguaytía River, a left‑bank tributary of the Ucayali River in eastern Peru. The Ucayali is one of the principal headwaters of the Amazon River, flowing northward to join the Marañón before forming the main Amazon channel. The type locality is the Río Huacamayo, at kilometre 155 of the Carretera Federico Basadre between Pucallpa and Tingo María, Provincia Padre Abad, Ucayali.

== Size ==
This species reaches a length of 7.1 cm (2.8 in).

== Etymology ==
The species name derives from the Latin word for 'javelin,' in reference to the vertically elongate, ventrally tapering humeral spot on its side.
