= Creagrutus anary =

Conservation status
- Least Concern (IUCN 3.1)

Scientific classification
- Kingdom: Animalia
- Phylum: Chordata
- Class: Actinopterygii
- Order: Characiformes
- Family: Stevardiidae
- Genus: Creagrutus
- Species: C. anary

Binomial name
- Creagrutus anary Fowler, 1913

Species of fish

Creagrutus anary is a species of freshwater ray-finned fish, a characin, belonging to the family Stevardiidae.

This species reaches a length of 4.5 cm (1.8 in). It is found in the Madeira River basin in Brazil. Its name is based on its local name.
