= Creagrutus dulima =

Scientific classification
- Kingdom: Animalia
- Phylum: Chordata
- Class: Actinopterygii
- Order: Characiformes
- Family: Stevardiidae
- Genus: Creagrutus
- Species: C. dulima

Binomial name
- Creagrutus dulima Albornoz-Garzón, Conde-Saldaña, García-Melo, Taphorn & Villa-Navarro, 2018

Species of fish

Creagrutus dulima is a species of freshwater ray-finned fish, a characin, belonging to the family Stevardiidae. It was described in 2018 by Juan G. Albornoz-Garzón, Cristhian C. Conde-Saldaña, Luis J. García-Melo, Donal C. Taphorn and Francisco A. Villa-Navarro.

== Distribution and habitat ==
Creagrutus dulima is found in the upper Río Magdalena basin in Colombia. This species inhabits freshwater environments, typically in areas with moderate to fast-flowing water.

== Size ==
This species reaches a length of 7.6 cm (3.0 in).

== Physical description ==
Creagrutus dulima is characterized by its elongated body and distinctive coloration. The species exhibits a pattern of dark vertical bars along its body, which helps it blend into its environment. The fins are typically transparent or slightly tinted, adding to its camouflage.

== Behavior and ecology ==
As a member of the Characidae family, Creagrutus dulima is known for its schooling behavior. These fish often form large groups, which provides them with protection from predators. They are omnivorous, feeding on a variety of small invertebrates, algae, and plant matter.

== Conservation status ==
Currently, there is limited information on the conservation status of Creagrutus dulima. However, habitat degradation and pollution in the Río Magdalena basin could pose potential threats to this species. Further research and conservation efforts are needed to ensure the survival of this unique fish.

== Etymology ==
The fish is named dulima, the indigenous word of the Pijao ethnic group, meaning "river of snow" or "river of clouds", referring to the snow-covered Tolima mountain peak, which is the symbol of the department of Tolima which is where the type locality is situated, one of the most ecologically threatened areas in Colombia.
