= Creagrutus amoenus =

Conservation status
- Least Concern (IUCN 3.1)

Scientific classification
- Kingdom: Animalia
- Phylum: Chordata
- Class: Actinopterygii
- Order: Characiformes
- Family: Stevardiidae
- Genus: Creagrutus
- Species: C. amoenus

Binomial name
- Creagrutus amoenus Fowler, 1943

Synonyms
- Creagrutus boehlkei Géry, 1972

Species of fish

Creagrutus amoenus is a species of freshwater ray-finned fish, a characin, belonging to the family Stevardiidae.

This species reaches a length of 10.2 cm (4.0 in). It is found in South America in eastern Ecuador and southeastern Colombia swimming in the foothill rivers of the Andes.

The fish's name comes from the "Latin for pleasant, charming or delightful, presumably referring to its color, with 'bright silvery white' axial band in life and six 'more or less clearly defined dark blotches'".
