= Creagrutus vexillapinnus =

Scientific classification
- Kingdom: Animalia
- Phylum: Chordata
- Class: Actinopterygii
- Order: Characiformes
- Family: Stevardiidae
- Genus: Creagrutus
- Species: C. vexillapinnus

Binomial name
- Creagrutus vexillapinnus Vari & Harold, 2001

Species of fish

Creagrutus vexillapinnus is a species of freshwater ray-finned fish, a characin, belonging to the family Stevardiidae.

== Location ==
It is native to South America, occurring in the upper Negro River and the upper portions of the Orinoco River basins. The Negro River, one of the largest tributaries of the Amazon, drains vast areas of northwestern Brazil and southern Venezuela, flowing through extensive rainforest ecosystems before joining the Amazon near Manaus. The Orinoco River, by contrast, is one of the great river systems of Venezuela, flowing northward and eastward to the Atlantic Ocean and encompassing diverse habitats ranging from Andean piedmont streams to expansive floodplains. The headwaters of these two basins lie in close proximity, forming part of the Casiquiare canal region—a unique natural connection between the Amazon and Orinoco drainages. This area is recognized as a biogeographic crossroads, supporting exceptional aquatic biodiversity. The species' occurrence in these headwaters underscores its role within one of the most ecologically significant and hydrologically complex regions of South America.

== Size ==
This species reaches a length of 5.0 cm (2.0 in).

== Etymology ==
The species name derives from the Latin vexillum ('banner' or 'flag,' referring to the dorsal fin) and pinnus ('fin'), alluding to the prominent black spot on the dorsal fin.
