= Creagrutus gracilis =

Scientific classification
- Kingdom: Animalia
- Phylum: Chordata
- Class: Actinopterygii
- Order: Characiformes
- Family: Stevardiidae
- Genus: Creagrutus
- Species: C. gracilis

Binomial name
- Creagrutus gracilis Vari & Harold, 2001

Species of fish

Creagrutus gracilis is a species of freshwater ray-finned fish, a characin, belonging to the family Stevardiidae.

== Location ==
It is native to South America, occurring in the Amazonas and Loreto regions of Peru and at several localities along the eastern slopes of the Andean Cordilleras in Ecuador.

== Size ==
This species reaches a length of 7.7 cm (3.0 in).

== Etymology ==
The species name is derived from Latin for 'thin' or 'slender,' referring to its comparatively shallow body relative to many of its congeners.
