= Creagrutus flavescens =

Scientific classification
- Kingdom: Animalia
- Phylum: Chordata
- Class: Actinopterygii
- Order: Characiformes
- Family: Stevardiidae
- Genus: Creagrutus
- Species: C. flavescens

Binomial name
- Creagrutus flavescens Vari & Harold, 2001

Species of fish

Creagrutus flavescens is a species of freshwater ray-finned fish, a characin, belonging to the family Stevardiidae.

== Location ==
It is native to South America, occurring along the eastern slopes of the Andean piedmont.

== Size ==
This species reaches a length of 9.4 cm (3.7 in).

== Etymology ==
The species name is derived from Latin for 'golden yellow,' a reference to its coloration in life.
