= Creagrutus melasma =

Conservation status
- Least Concern (IUCN 3.1)

Scientific classification
- Kingdom: Animalia
- Phylum: Chordata
- Class: Actinopterygii
- Order: Characiformes
- Family: Stevardiidae
- Genus: Creagrutus
- Species: C. melasma

Binomial name
- Creagrutus melasma Vari, Harold & Taphorn, 1994

Species of fish

Creagrutus melasma, commonly known as the red-finned buck-toothed tetra, is a species of freshwater ray-finned fish, a characin, belonging to the family Stevardiidae.

== Distribution ==
It is native to South America, occurring in the Orinoco River basin as well as in the Tuy and Neverí rivers of the Caribbean Sea versant in Venezuela. The Orinoco is one of the continent's largest river systems, draining vast areas of Venezuela and serving as a major center of Neotropical freshwater biodiversity. Its basin encompasses a mosaic of habitats ranging from floodplain forests and savannas to blackwater tributaries, supporting high levels of endemism. The Tuy and Neverí rivers, smaller coastal drainages flowing into the Caribbean, provide distinct ecological settings shaped by seasonal rainfall and montane influences. Together, these systems highlight the species’ adaptability across diverse hydrological environments, linking the immense Orinoco basin with the more localized Caribbean versant rivers. This distribution underscores the ecological breadth of Venezuela's freshwater networks and their importance as reservoirs of biodiversity.

== Size ==
This species reaches a length of 4.5 cm (1.8 in).

== Etymology ==
The species name derives from the Greek mélasma (μέλασμα), meaning ‘black spot,’ in reference to the distinctive pigmentation on its dorsal fin.
