= Pterobrycon =

Scientific classification
- Kingdom: Animalia
- Phylum: Chordata
- Class: Actinopterygii
- Order: Characiformes
- Family: Stevardiidae
- Subfamily: Stevardiinae
- Genus: Pterobrycon; C. H. Eigenmann, 1913

Type species
- Pterobrycon landoni C. H. Eigenmann, 1913

Genus of fishes

Pterobrycon is a genus of freshwater ray-finned fish, characins, belonging to the family Stevardiidae. The fishes in this genus are found in Colombia and Costa Rica.

== Species ==
Pterobrycon contains the following valid species:

- Pterobrycon landoni C. H. Eigenmann, 1913
- Pterobrycon myrnae W. A. Bussing, 1974 (Semaphore tetra)
