= Ptychocharax =

Conservation status
- Least Concern (IUCN 3.1)

Scientific classification
- Kingdom: Animalia
- Phylum: Chordata
- Class: Actinopterygii
- Order: Characiformes
- Family: Stevardiidae
- Subfamily: Xenurobryconinae
- Genus: Ptychocharax; S. H. Weitzman, S. V. Fink, Machado-Allison & Royero-L., 1994
- Species: P. rhyacophila

Binomial name
- Ptychocharax rhyacophila Weitzman, S. V. Fink, Machado-Allison & Royero, 1994

Species of fish

Ptychocharax is a monospecific genus of freshwater ray-finned fish belonging to the family Stevardiidae. The only species in the genus is Ptychocharax rhyacophila, a fish which is endemic to Venezuela, where it is found in the upper Siapa River.
