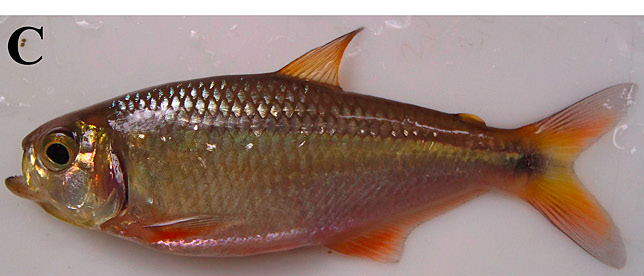
- Eretmobrycon scleroparius

Scientific classification
- Kingdom: Animalia
- Phylum: Chordata
- Class: Actinopterygii
- Order: Characiformes
- Family: Stevardiidae
- Subfamily: Landoninae
- Genus: Eretmobrycon; W. L. Fink, 1976

Type species
- Eretmobrycon bayano W. L. Fink, 1976

= Eretmobrycon =

Genus of fishes

Eretmobrycon is a genus of freshwater ray-finned fishes belonging to the family Stevardiidae. The fishes in this genus are found in Central and South America.

== Etymology ==
Eretmón (Gr. ἐρετμόν) means "oar" or "paddle", referring to the paddle-like lower caudal-fin lobe of E. bayano. "Brycon" is a generalized term used in generic names of many characiform fishes, derived from brýchō (Gr. βρύχω), meaning to "bite", "gnash teeth" or "eat greedily", originally an allusion to a fully toothed maxillae.

== Species ==
Eretmobrycon contains the following valid species:

- Eretmobrycon bayano W. L. Fink, 1976
- Eretmobrycon brevirostris (Günther, 1860)
- Eretmobrycon ecuadorensis (Román-Valencia, Ruiz-C., Taphorn, Jiménez-Prado & García-Alzate, 2015)
- Eretmobrycon emperador (C. H. Eigenmann & Ogle, 1907)
- Eretmobrycon festae (Boulenger, 1898)
- Eretmobrycon gonzalezoi (Román-Valencia, 2002)
- Eretmobrycon guaytarae (C. H. Eigenmann & Henn, 1914)
- Eretmobrycon ichoensis (Román-Valencia, 2000)
- Eretmobrycon miraensis (Fowler, 1945)
- Eretmobrycon peruanus (Müller & Troschel, 1845)
- Eretmobrycon scleroparius (Regan, 1908)
- Eretmobrycon simus (Boulenger, 1898)
- Eretmobrycon terrabensis (Meek, 1914)
