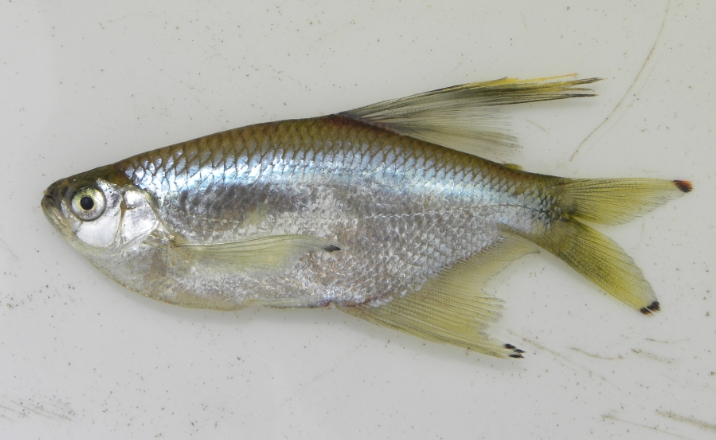
- P. doriae

Scientific classification
- Kingdom: Animalia
- Phylum: Chordata
- Class: Actinopterygii
- Order: Characiformes
- Family: Stevardiidae
- Subfamily: Stevardiinae
- Genus: Pseudocorynopoma; Perugia, 1891

Type species
- Pseudocorynopoma doriae Perugia, 1891

Species
- 3, see text

= Pseudocorynopoma =

Genus of fishes

Pseudocorynopoma is a genus of freshwater ray-finned fish, characins, belonging to the family Stevardiidae. The fishes in this genus are found in tropical South America.

== Species ==
There are currently 3 recognized species in this genus:

- Pseudocorynopoma doriae Perugia, 1891 - Dragon-fin tetra
- Pseudocorynopoma heterandria C. H. Eigenmann, 1914
- Pseudocorynopoma stanleyi L. R. Malabarba, Chuctaya, Hirschmann, Oliveira & Thomaz, 2020
