= Chrysobrycon =

Scientific classification
- Kingdom: Animalia
- Phylum: Chordata
- Class: Actinopterygii
- Order: Characiformes
- Family: Stevardiidae
- Subfamily: Stevardiinae
- Genus: Chrysobrycon; S. H. Weitzman & Menezes, 1998

Type species
- Hysteronotus hesperus Böhlke, 1958

Genus of fishes

Chrysobrycon is a genus of freshwater ray-finned fishes, characins, belonging to the family Stevardiidae. These fishes are found in South America.

== Species ==
Chrysobrycon contains the following valid species:

- Chrysobrycon calamar Vanegas-Ríos, Urbano-Bonilla & Sánchez-Garcés, 2024
- Chrysobrycon eliasi Vanegas-Ríos, Azpelicueta & Ortega, 2011
- Chrysobrycon guahibo Vanegas-Ríos, Urbano-Bonilla & Azpelicueta, 2015
- Chrysobrycon hesperus (Böhlke, 1958)
- Chrysobrycon mojicai Vanegas-Ríos & Urbano-Bonilla, 2017
- Chrysobrycon myersi (Weitzman & Thomerson, 1970)
- Chrysobrycon ximango Silva-Oliveira, Vanegas-Ríos, Canto & Ribeiro, 2025
- Chrysobrycon yoliae Vanegas-Ríos, Azpelicueta & Ortega, 2014
