= Attonitus =

Scientific classification
- Kingdom: Animalia
- Phylum: Chordata
- Class: Actinopterygii
- Order: Characiformes
- Family: Stevardiidae
- Subfamily: Diapominae
- Genus: Attonitus; Vari & H. Ortega, 2000

Type species
- Attonitus irisae Vari & H. Ortega, 2000

Genus of fishes

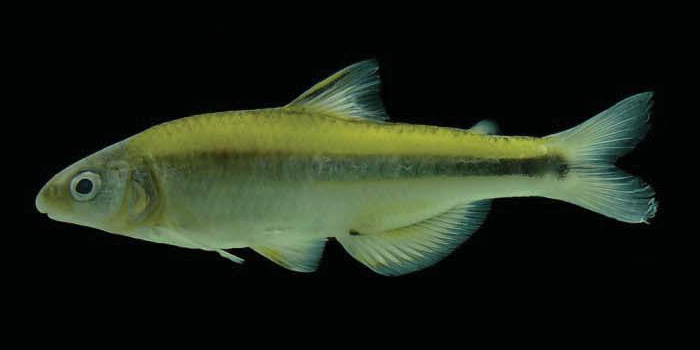
Attonitus ephimeros, 48 mm long, collected from the upper Rio Ucayali

Attonitus is a genus of freshwater ray-finned fishes, characins, belonging to the family Stevardiidae. The fishes in this genus are endemic to Peru.

== Species ==
Attonitus contains the following valid species:

- Attonitus bounites Vari & H. Ortega, 2000
- Attonitus ephimeros Vari & H. Ortega, 2000
- Attonitus irisae Vari & H. Ortega, 2000
