= Rhinopetitia =

Scientific classification
- Kingdom: Animalia
- Phylum: Chordata
- Class: Actinopterygii
- Order: Characiformes
- Family: Stevardiidae
- Subfamily: Diapominae
- Genus: Rhinopetitia; Géry, 1964

Type species
- Rhinopetitia myersi Géry, 1964

Genus of fishes

Rhinopetitia is a genus of freshwater ray-finned fish, characins, belonging to the family Stevardiidae. The fishes in this genus are endemic to Brazil.

== Species ==
Rhinopetitia contains the following valid species:

- Rhinopetitia melanohumeralis Menezes & Netto-Ferreira, 2019
- Rhinopetitia myersi Géry, 1964
- Rhinopetitia nigrofasciata Menezes & Netto-Ferreira, 2019
- Rhinopetitia oligolepis Menezes & Netto-Ferreira, 2019
- Rhinopetitia paucirastra Menezes & Netto-Ferreira, 2019
- Rhinopetitia potamorhachia Netto-Ferreira, Birindelli, L. M. Sousa & Menezes, 2014
