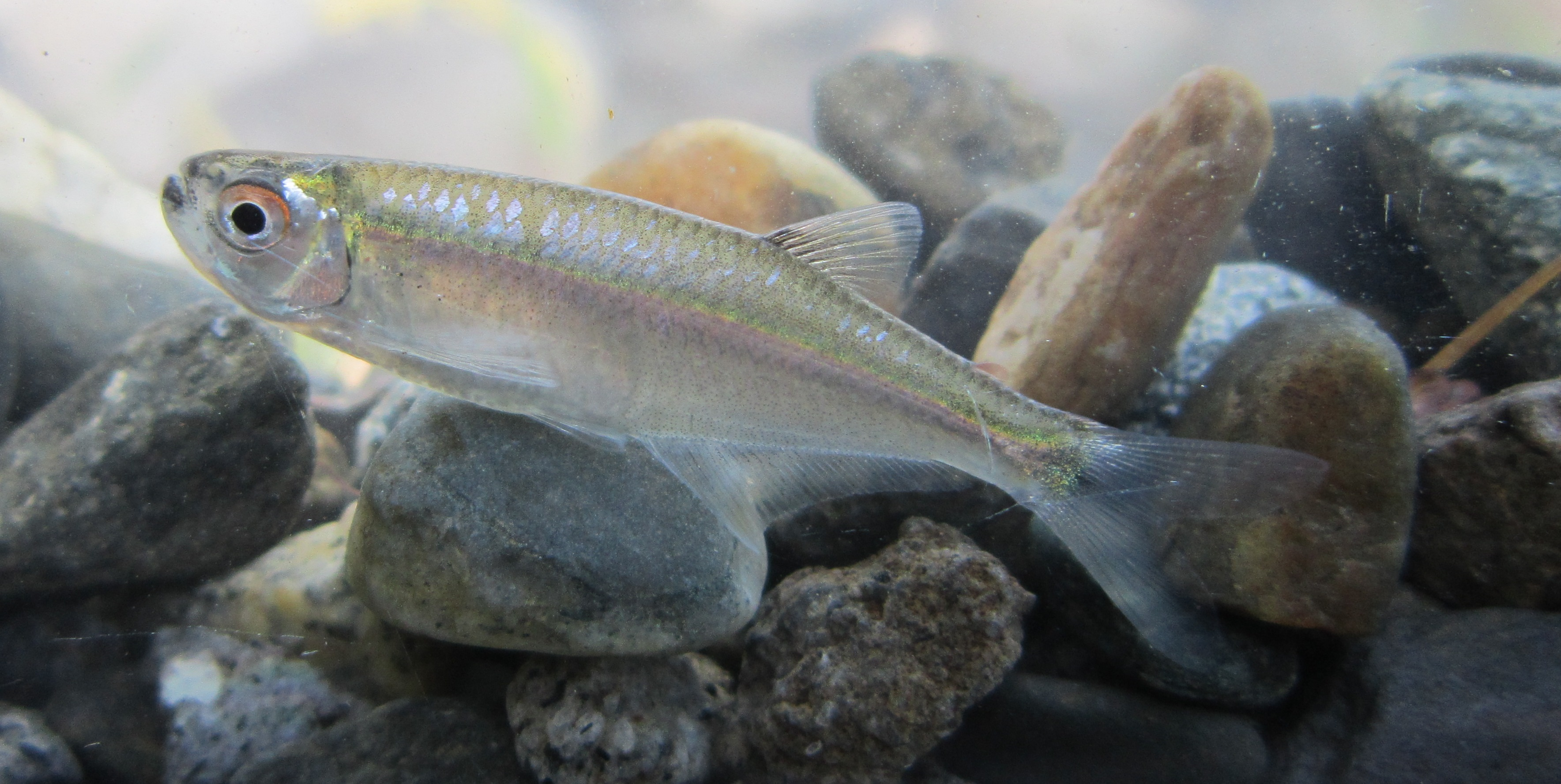
- Gephyrocharax melanocheir

Scientific classification
- Kingdom: Animalia
- Phylum: Chordata
- Class: Actinopterygii
- Order: Characiformes
- Family: Stevardiidae
- Subfamily: Stevardiinae
- Genus: Gephyrocharax; C. H. Eigenmann, 1912

Type species
- Gephyrocharax chocoensis C. H. Eigenmann, 1912

Synonyms
- Corynopomops Fowler, 1943

= Gephyrocharax =

Genus of fishes

Gephyrocharax is a genus of freshwater ray-finned fish, characins, belonging to the family Stevardiidae. The fishes in this genus are found in South America, Trinidad in the Caribbean, and Panama.

== Species ==
There are currently 12 recognized species in this genus:

- Gephyrocharax atracaudatus (Meek & Hildebrand, 1912)
- Gephyrocharax caucanus C. H. Eigenmann, 1912
- Gephyrocharax chocoensis C. H. Eigenmann, 1912
- Gephyrocharax intermedius Meek & Hildebrand, 1916
- Gephyrocharax machadoi Ferreira, Faria, Ribeiro, Santana, Quagio-Grassioto & Menezes, 2018
- Gephyrocharax major G. S. Myers, 1929
- Gephyrocharax martae Dahl, 1943
- Gephyrocharax melanocheir C. H. Eigenmann, 1912
- Gephyrocharax sinuensis Dahl, 1964
- Gephyrocharax torresi Vanegas-Ríos, Azpelicueta, Mirande & García Gonzáles, 2013
- Gephyrocharax valencia C. H. Eigenmann, 1920
- Gephyrocharax venezuelae L. P. Schultz, 1944
