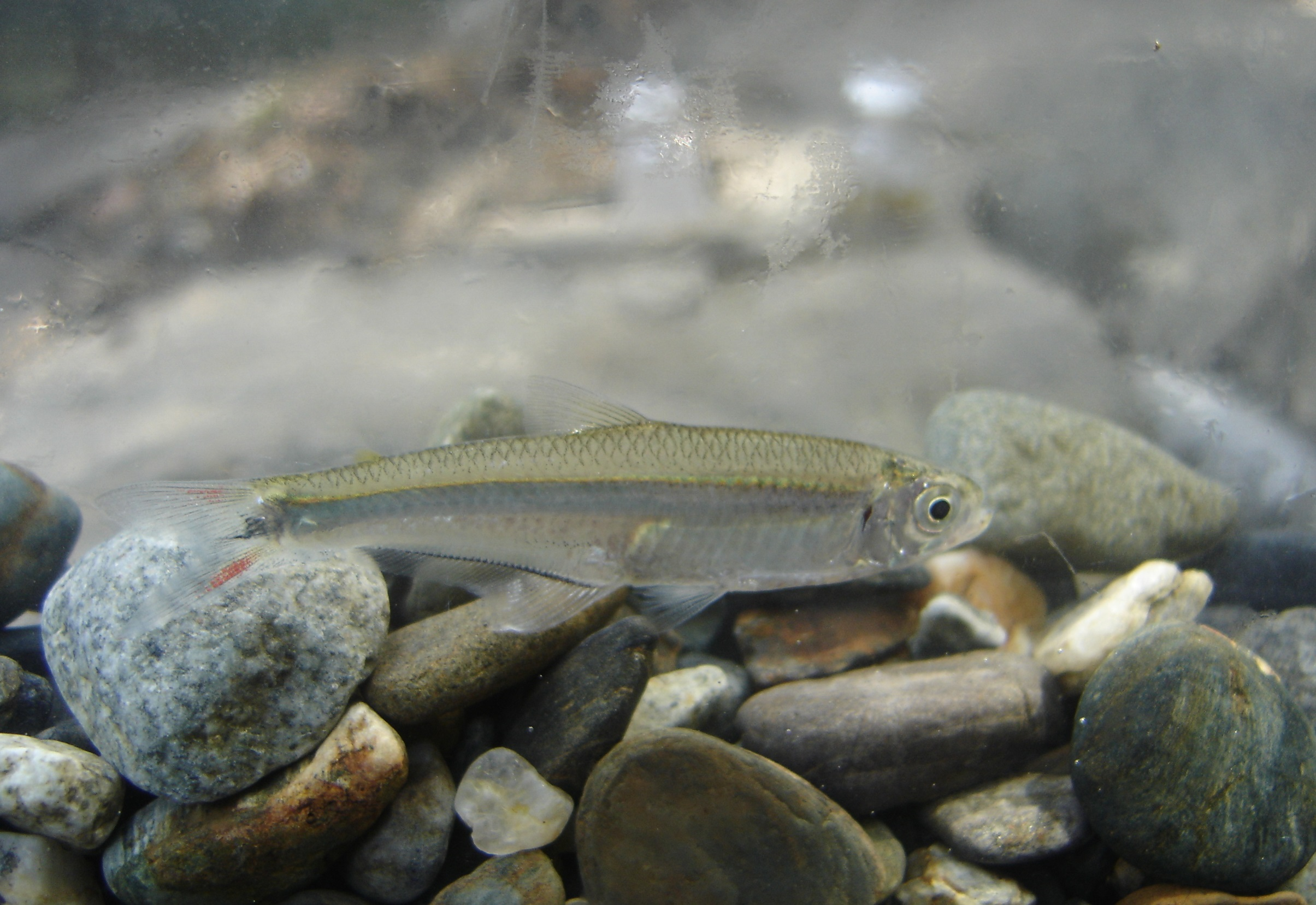
- Argopleura magdalenensis

Scientific classification
- Kingdom: Animalia
- Phylum: Chordata
- Class: Actinopterygii
- Order: Characiformes
- Family: Stevardiidae
- Subfamily: Argopleurinae; B. F. Melo & Oliveira, 2024
- Genus: Argopleura; C. H. Eigenmann, 1913

Type species
- Bryconamericus magdalenensis C. H. Eigenmann, 1913

Synonyms
- Xenurocharax Regan, 1913

= Argopleura =

Genus of fishes

Argopleura, the Andean tetras, is a genus of freshwater ray-finned fishes, characins, belonging to the family Stevardiidae. The fishes in this genus are endemic to Colombia. This is the only genus in the monospecific subfamily Agropleurinae. This genus was previously classified in the family Characidae, but this was split into multiple families in 2024. They are found in South and Central America.

== Species ==
Agropleura contains the following valid species:

- Argopleura chocoensis (C. H. Eigenmann, 1913)
- Argopleura conventus (C. H. Eigenmann, 1913)
- Argopleura diquensis (C. H. Eigenmann, 1913)
- Argopleura magdalenensis (C. H. Eigenmann, 1913)
