= Tyttocharax madeirae =

Conservation status
- Least Concern (IUCN 3.1)

Scientific classification
- Kingdom: Animalia
- Phylum: Chordata
- Class: Actinopterygii
- Order: Characiformes
- Family: Stevardiidae
- Genus: Tyttocharax
- Species: T. madeirae

Binomial name
- Tyttocharax madeirae Fowler, 1913

Synonyms
- Microcaelurus odontocheilus Miranda-Ribeiro, 1939

Species of fish

Tyttocharax madeirae, the blackedge tetra, also known as the bristly-mouthed tetra or the blue tetra, is a small freshwater ray-finned fish belonging to the family Stevardiidae. This species is found in the Amazon basin of South America. It was first caught by Edgar A. Smith in 1912 in Brazil and described by American ichthyologist Henry Weed Fowler in 1913.

Unlike many other characins, T. madeirae has seen little inclusion into the aquarium trade.

== Discovery and naming ==
Along with other descriptions made by Fowler in 1913, eight specimens of T. madeirae, including the holotype and the paratype, were collected by Edgar A. Smith during a 1912-1913 expedition to the Amazon basin in Brazil along the Madeira River.

In his description, Fowler named the species for the Madeira River.

== Distribution ==
Tyttocharax madeirae has been found in the lower and middle tributaries of the Amazon basin, being found in the nations of Brazil, Bolivia, and Peru. It is pelagic, and according to observations by Herbert R. Axelrod were found in shallow waters 0.3 to 0.6 metres (1 ft 0 in to 2 ft 0 in) at most.

In a sampling expedition by Barros et al., T. madeirae accounted for 0.82% of the total 5508 collected specimens and occurred in 13.6% of the sampled streams of the Madeira-Purus interfluvial plain.

== Description ==
Fowler did not describe the colors of a living T. madeirae. However, it was described as palish brown when in alcohol, exhibiting countershading with a paler underside.

T. madeirae is considered small, with the average length of the species being 1.5 cm (0.59 in) and ranging from 1.1 to 1.8 cm (0.43 to 0.71 in).

== Ecology ==
Tyttocharax madeirae is an invertivore, specializing on aquatic invertebrates while also occasionally preying on terrestrial vertebrates which may fall into the water.
