= Stevardiinae =

Scientific classification
- Kingdom: Animalia
- Phylum: Chordata
- Class: Actinopterygii
- Order: Characiformes
- Family: Stevardiidae
- Subfamily: Stevardiinae; Gill, 1958

Type genus
- Stevardia Gill, 1858

Subfamily of fishes

Stevardiinae is a subfamily of freshwater ray-finned fishes, belonging to the family Stevardiidae. The subfamily comprises genera which were previously classified in the family Characidae, but this was split into multiple families in 2024. They are found in South and Central America.

== Genera ==
Stevardiinae contains the following genera:

- Chrysobrycon Weitzman & Menezes, 1998
- Corynopoma Gill, 1858
- Gephyrocharax C. H. Eigenmann, 1912
- Hysteronotus C. H. Eigenmann, 1911
- Pseudocorynopoma Perugia, 1891
- Pterobrycon C. H. Eigenmann, 1913
- Varicharax Vanegas-Ríos, Faustino-Fuster, Meza-Vargas & Ortega, 2020
