= Hysteronotus =

Conservation status
- Least Concern (IUCN 3.1)

Scientific classification
- Kingdom: Animalia
- Phylum: Chordata
- Class: Actinopterygii
- Division: Teleostei
- Order: Characiformes
- Family: Stevardiidae
- Subfamily: Stevardiinae
- Genus: Hysteronotus; C. H. Eigenmann, 1911
- Species: H. megalostomus

Binomial name
- Hysteronotus megalostomus C. H. Eigenmann, 1911

Species of fish

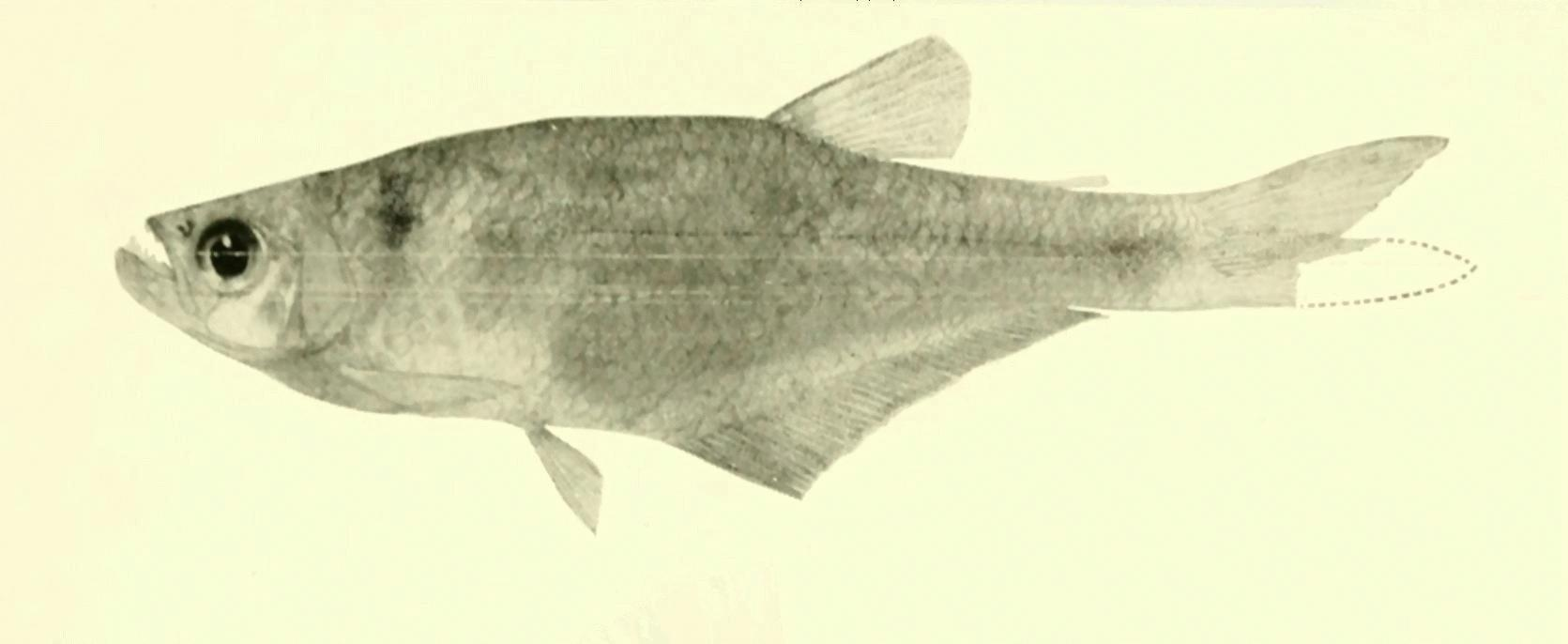
Hysteronotus megalostomus

Hysteronotus is a monospecific genus of freshwater ray-finned fish belonging to the family Stevardiidae. The only species in the genus is Hysteronotus megalostomus, a characin, which is endemic to Brazil in the drainage system of the São Francisco River.
