= Varicharax =

Scientific classification
- Kingdom: Animalia
- Phylum: Chordata
- Class: Actinopterygii
- Order: Characiformes
- Family: Stevardiidae
- Subfamily: Stevardiinae
- Genus: Varicharax; Vanegas-Ríos, Faustino-Fuster, Meza-Vargas & Ortega, 2020
- Species: V. nigrolineatus

Binomial name
- Varicharax nigrolineatus Vanegas-Ríos, Faustino-Fuster, Meza-Vargas & Ortega, 2020

Monospecific genus of fish

Varicharax is a monospecific genus of freshwater ray-finned fish belonging to the family Stevardiidae. The only species in this genus is Varicharax nigrolineatus, a characin, which is endemic to Peru where it is found in the Río Corrientes drainage, part of the Río Marañón basin in Loreto, Peru.
