= Monotocheirodon =

Scientific classification
- Kingdom: Animalia
- Phylum: Chordata
- Class: Actinopterygii
- Order: Characiformes
- Family: Stevardiidae
- Subfamily: Diapominae
- Genus: Monotocheirodon; C. H. Eigenmann & N. E. Pearson

Type species
- Monotocheirodon pearsoni C. H. Eigenmann, 1924

Genus of fishes

Monotocheirodon is a genus of freshwater ray-finned fishes, characins, belonging to the family Stevardiidae. The fishes in this genus are found in tropical South America.

== Species ==
Monotocheirodon contains the following valid species:

- Monotocheirodon drilos Menezes, Weitzman & Quagio-Grassiotto, 2013
- Monotocheirodon duda Carvalho, Thomaz, Urbano-Bonilla & Prada-Pedreros, 2024
- Monotocheirodon kontos Menezes, Weitzman & Quagio-Grassiotto, 2013
- Monotocheirodon pearsoni C. H. Eigenmann, 1924
