= Creagrutus xiphos =

Conservation status
- Data Deficient (IUCN 3.1)

Scientific classification
- Kingdom: Animalia
- Phylum: Chordata
- Class: Actinopterygii
- Division: Teleostei
- Order: Characiformes
- Family: Stevardiidae
- Genus: Creagrutus
- Species: C. xiphos

Binomial name
- Creagrutus xiphos Vari & Harold, 2001

Species of fish

Creagrutus xiphos is a species of freshwater ray-finned fish, a characin, belonging to the family Stevardiidae.

== Distribution ==
It is native to South America, occurring in the Mato River in the Caura River basin, part of the Orinoco River drainage.

== Size ==
This species reaches a length of 2.8 cm (1.1 in).

== Etymology ==
The species name derives from the Greek xíphos (ξίφος), meaning ‘sword’ or ‘saber,’ in reference to its elongate head and body.
