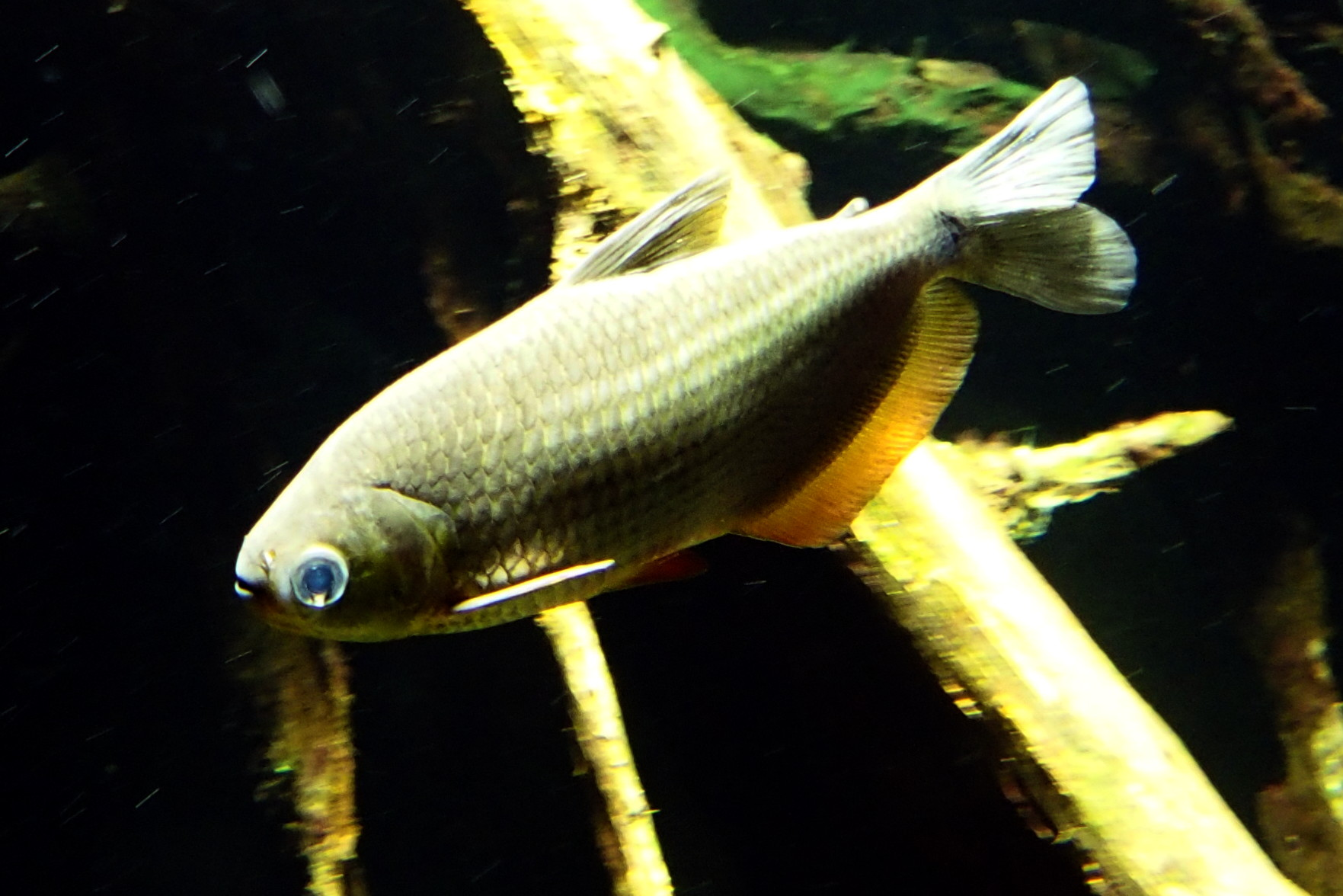
- Markiana nigripinnis

Scientific classification
- Kingdom: Animalia
- Phylum: Chordata
- Class: Actinopterygii
- Order: Characiformes
- Family: Stevardiidae
- Subfamily: Landoninae
- Genus: Markiana; C. H. Eigenmann, 1903

Type species
- Tetragonopterus nigripinnis Perugia, 1891

= Markiana =

Genus of fishes

Markiana is a genus of freshwater ray-finned fishes belonging to the family Stevardiidae. These fishes are found in tropical South America.

== Species ==
Markiana contains the following valid species:

- Markiana geayi (Pellegrin, 1909)
- Markiana nigripinnis (Perugia, 1891)
