= Tyttocharax =

Scientific classification
- Kingdom: Animalia
- Phylum: Chordata
- Class: Actinopterygii
- Order: Characiformes
- Family: Stevardiidae
- Subfamily: Xenurobryconinae
- Genus: Tyttocharax; Fowler, 1913

Type species
- Tyttocharax madeirae Fowler, 1913

Genus of fishes

Tyttocharax is a genus of freshwater ray-finned fish belonging to the family Stevardiidae. The fishes in this genus are found in tropical South America.

== Species ==
There are currently 4 recognized species in this genus:

- Tyttocharax cochui (Ladiges, 1949)
- Tyttocharax madeirae Fowler, 1913 (Black-edge tetra)
- Tyttocharax metae Román-Valencia, García-Alzate, Ruiz-C. & Taphorn, 2012
- Tyttocharax tambopatensis S. H. Weitzman & H. Ortega, 1995
