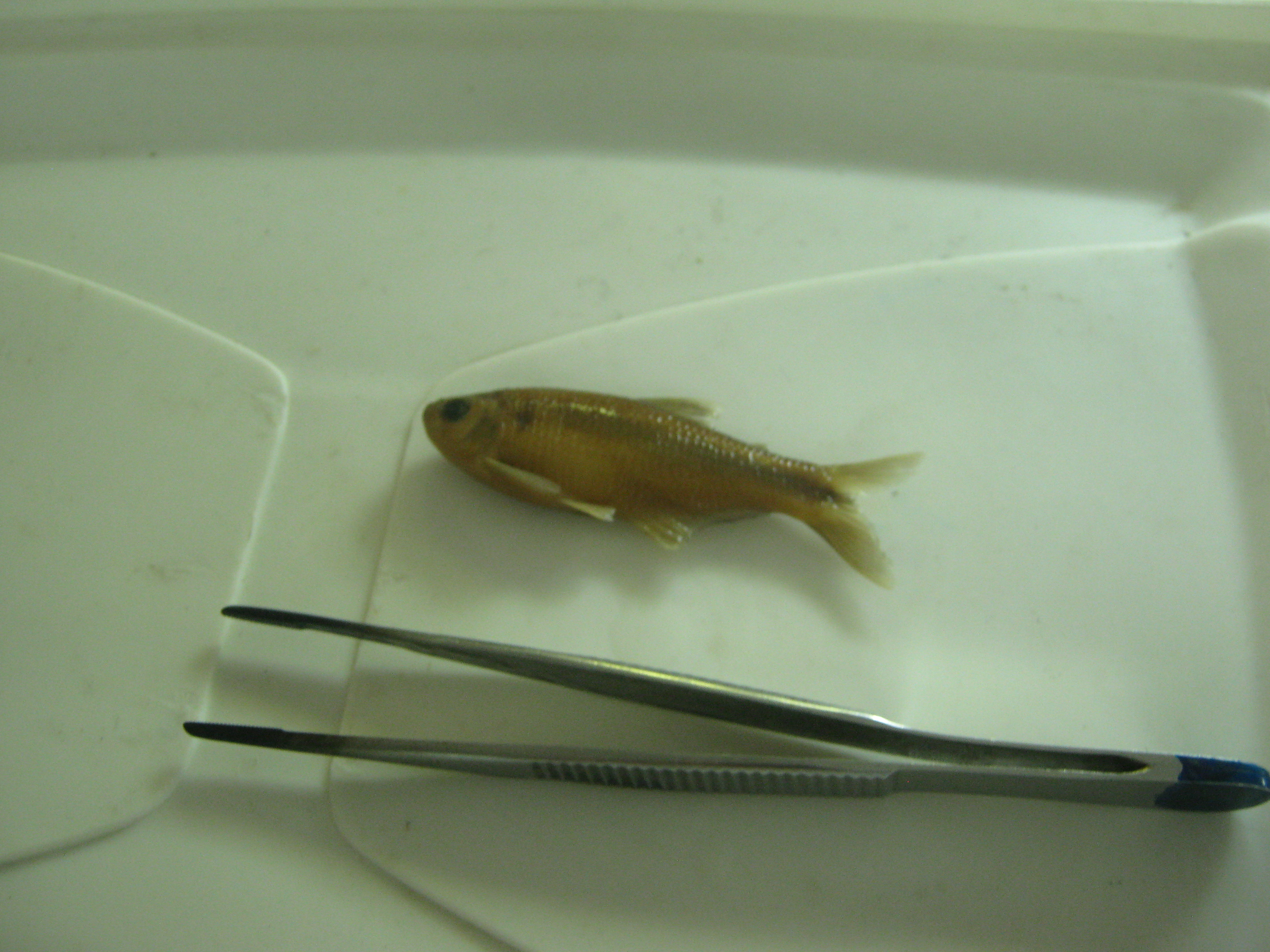
- Creagrutus brevipinnis

Scientific classification
- Kingdom: Animalia
- Phylum: Chordata
- Class: Actinopterygii
- Order: Characiformes
- Family: Stevardiidae
- Subfamily: Creagrutinae
- Genus: Creagrutus; Günther, 1864

Type species
- Leporinus muelleri Günther, 1859

Synonyms
- Creagrudite Myers, 1927; Creagrutops Schultz, 1944

= Creagrutus =

Genus of fishes

Creagrutus is a genus of freshwater ray-finned fishes, characins, belonging to the family Stevardiidae. The fishes in this genus are found mostly in South America, with one species, C. affinis, extending into Panama in Central America.

== Species ==
Creagrutus contains the following valid species:

- Creagrutus affinis Steindachner, 1880
- Creagrutus amoenus Fowler, 1943
- Creagrutus anary Fowler, 1913
- Creagrutus andaki Albornoz-Garzón, Acosta-Santos, Bogatá-Gregory & Agudelo-Córdoba, 2020
- Creagrutus ardilai Ardila Rodríguez, 2021
- Creagrutus argos Ardila Rodríguez, 2020
- Creagrutus atratus Vari & Harold, 2001
- Creagrutus atrisignum Myers, 1927
- Creagrutus barrigai Vari & Harold, 2001
- Creagrutus beni C. H. Eigenmann, 1911
- Creagrutus bolivari Schultz, 1944
- Creagrutus brevipinnis C. H. Eigenmann, 1913
- Creagrutus britskii Vari & Harold, 2001
- Creagrutus cacique Flausino & Lima, 2019
- Creagrutus calai Vari & Harold, 2001
- Creagrutus caucanus C. H. Eigenmann, 1913
- Creagrutus cerritulus Netto-Ferreira & Vari, 2017
- Creagrutus changae Vari & Harold, 2001
- Creagrutus cimitarraensis Ardila Rodríguez, 2023
- Creagrutus cochui Géry, 1964
- Creagrutus convencionensis Ardila Rodríguez, 2023
- Creagrutus corredori Ardila Rodríguez, 2023
- Creagrutus cracentis Vari & Harold, 2001
- Creagrutus crenatus Vari & Harold, 2001
- Creagrutus dulima Albornoz-Garzón, Conde-Saldaña, García-Melo, Taphorn & Villa-Navarro, 2018
- Creagrutus embera Ardila Rodríguez, 2023
- Creagrutus ephippiatus Vari & Harold, 2001
- Creagrutus figueiredoi Vari & Harold, 2001
- Creagrutus flavescens Vari & Harold, 2001
- Creagrutus florianensis Ardila Rodríguez, 2023
- Creagrutus gephyrus Böhlke & Saul, 1975
- Creagrutus gracilis Vari & Harold, 2001
- Creagrutus guanes Torres-Mejia & Vari, 2005
- Creagrutus gyrospilus Vari & Harold, 2001
- Creagrutus hildebrandi Schultz, 1944
- Creagrutus holmi Vari & Harold, 2001
- Creagrutus hysginus Harold, Vari, Machado-Allison & Provenzano, 1994
- Creagrutus ignotus Vari & Harold, 2001
- Creagrutus jordanensis Ardila Rodríguez, 2021
- Creagrutus kunturus Vari, Harold & Ortega, 1995
- Creagrutus lassoi Vari & Harold, 2001
- Creagrutus lepidus Vari, Harold, Lasso & Machado-Allison, 1993
- Creagrutus leuciscus Regan, 1913
- Creagrutus machadoi Vari & Harold, 2001
- Creagrutus maculosus Román-Valencia, García-Alzate, Ruiz-C. & Taphorn, 2010
- Creagrutus magdalenae C. H. Eigenmann, 1913
- Creagrutus magoi Vari & Harold, 2001
- Creagrutus manu Vari & Harold, 2001
- Creagrutus maracaiboensis (Schultz, 1944)
- Creagrutus mariposa Ardila Rodríguez, 2021
- Creagrutus martinezi Ardila Rodríguez, 2021
- Creagrutus maxillaris (Myers, 1927)
- Creagrutus melanzonus C. H. Eigenmann, 1909
- Creagrutus melasma Vari, Harold & Taphorn, 1994
- Creagrutus menezesi Vari & Harold, 2001
- Creagrutus meridionalis Vari & Harold, 2001
- Creagrutus metropolitana Ardila Rodríguez, 2024
- Creagrutus molinus Vari & Harold, 2001
- Creagrutus mucipu Vari & Harold, 2001
- Creagrutus muelleri (Günther, 1859)
- Creagrutus narvaezi Ardila Rodríguez, 2023
- Creagrutus nigrostigmatus Dahl, 1960
- Creagrutus nigrotaeniatus Dagosta & Pastana, 2014
- Creagrutus occidaneus Vari & Harold, 2001
- Creagrutus ortegai Vari & Harold, 2001
- Creagrutus ouranonastes Vari & Harold 2001
- Creagrutus paraguayensis Mahnert & Géry, 1988
- Creagrutus paralacus Harold & Vari, 1994
- Creagrutus pearsoni Mahnert & Géry, 1988
- Creagrutus peruanus (Steindachner, 1876)
- Creagrutus petilus Vari & Harold, 2001
- Creagrutus phasma Myers, 1927
- Creagrutus pila Vari & Harold, 2001
- Creagrutus planquettei Géry & Renno, 1989
- Creagrutus provenzanoi Vari & Harold, 2001
- Creagrutus runa Vari & Harold, 2001
- Creagrutus saxatilis Vari & Harold, 2001
- Creagrutus seductus Vari & Harold, 2001
- Creagrutus taphorni Vari & Harold, 2001
- Creagrutus tuyuka Vari & Lima, 2003
- Creagrutus ungulus Vari & Harold, 2001
- Creagrutus varii Ribeiro, Benine & Figueiredo, 2004
- Creagrutus veruina Vari & Harold, 2001
- Creagrutus vexillapinnus Vari & Harold, 2001
- Creagrutus yanatili Harold & Salcedo, 2010
- Creagrutus yudja Netto-Ferreira & Moreira, 2018
- Creagrutus xiphos Vari & Harold, 2001
- Creagrutus zephyrus Vari & Harold, 2001
