= Scopaeocharax =

Scientific classification
- Kingdom: Animalia
- Phylum: Chordata
- Class: Actinopterygii
- Order: Characiformes
- Family: Stevardiidae
- Subfamily: Xenurobryconinae
- Genus: Scopaeocharax; S. H. Weitzman & S. V. Fink, 1985

Type species
- Tyttocharax rhinodus J. E. Böhlke, 1958

Genus of fishes

Scopaeocharax is a genus of freshwater ray-finned fishes belonging to the family Stevardiidae. The fishes in this genus are endemic to Peru, where both species are found in the upper and middle Huallaga River basin.

== Species ==
Scopaeocharax contains the following species:

- Scopaeocharax atopodus (J. E. Böhlke, 1958)
- Scopaeocharax rhinodus (J. E. Böhlke, 1958)
