= Phallobrycon =

Scientific classification
- Kingdom: Animalia
- Phylum: Chordata
- Class: Actinopterygii
- Order: Characiformes
- Family: Stevardiidae
- Subfamily: Diapominae
- Genus: Phallobrycon; Menezes, K. M. Ferreira & Netto-Ferreira, 2009

Type species
- Phallobrycon adenacanthus Menezes, Ferreira & Netto-Ferreira, 2009

Genus of fishes

Phallobrycon is a genus of freshwater ray-finned fishes, characins, belonging to the family Stevardiidae. The fishes in this genus are endemic to Brazil.

== Species ==
Phallobrycon contains the following valid species:

- Phallobrycon adenacanthus Menezes, K. M. Ferreira & Netto-Ferreira, 2009
- Phallobrycon synarmacanthus Netto-Ferreira, Bastos, Sousa & Menezes, 2016
