= Xenurobrycon =

Scientific classification
- Kingdom: Animalia
- Phylum: Chordata
- Class: Actinopterygii
- Order: Characiformes
- Family: Stevardiidae
- Subfamily: Xenurobryconinae
- Genus: Xenurobrycon; Myers & P. Miranda-Ribeiro, 1945

Type species
- Xenurobrycon macropus Myers & P. Miranda-Ribeiro, 1945

Genus of fishes

Xenurobrycon is a genus of freshwater ray-finned fish belonging to the family Stevardiidae. The fishes in this genus are found in tropical South America.

== Species ==
Xenurobrycon contains the following species:

- Xenurobrycon coracoralinae C. L. R. Moreira, 2005
- Xenurobrycon heterodon Weitzman & S. V. Fink, 1985
- Xenurobrycon macropus Myers & P. Miranda-Ribeiro, 1945
- Xenurobrycon polyancistrus Weitzman, 1987
- Xenurobrycon pteropus Weitzman & S. V. Fink, 1985
- Xenurobrycon varii Mendonça, L. A. W. Peixoto, Dutra & Netto-Ferreira, 2016
