= Lepidocharax =

Scientific classification
- Kingdom: Animalia
- Phylum: Chordata
- Class: Actinopterygii
- Order: Characiformes
- Family: Stevardiidae
- Subfamily: Planaltininae
- Genus: Lepidocharax; K. M. Ferreira, Menezes & Quagio-Grassiotto, 2011

Type species
- Lepidocharax diamantina K. M. Ferreira, Menezes & Quagio-Grassiotto, 2011

Genus of fishes

Lepidocharax is a genus of freshwater ray-finned fish, characins, belonging to the family Stevardiidae. The fishes in this genus are endemic to the Doce, Paraguaçu and São Francisco basins in eastern Brazil. They are small fish, that reach up to 4 cm (1.6 in) in standard length.

== Species ==
Lepidocharax contains the following valid species:

- Lepidocharax burnsi Ferreira, Menezes & Quagio-Grassiotto, 2011
- Lepidocharax diamantina K. M. Ferreira, Menezes & Quagio-Grassioto, 2011
