= Planaltina (fish) =

Scientific classification
- Kingdom: Animalia
- Phylum: Chordata
- Class: Actinopterygii
- Order: Characiformes
- Family: Stevardiidae
- Subfamily: Planaltininae
- Genus: Planaltina; Böhlke, 1954

Type species
- Planaltina myersi Böhlke, 1954

Genus of fishes

Planaltina is a genus of freshwater ray-finned fish, characins, belonging to the family Stevardiidae. The fishes in this genus are endemic to Brazil.

== Species ==
Planaltina contains the following valid species:

- Planaltina britskii Menezes, S. H. Weitzman & J. R. Burns, 2003
- Planaltina glandipedis Menezes, S. H. Weitzman & J. R. Burns, 2003
- Planaltina kaingang Deprá, da Graça, Pavanelli, Avelino & Oliveira, 2018
- Planaltina myersi J. E. Böhlke, 1954
