= Vinces River =

River of Ecuador

Coordinates: 1.3964°S 79.7233°W

Location
- Country: Ecuador

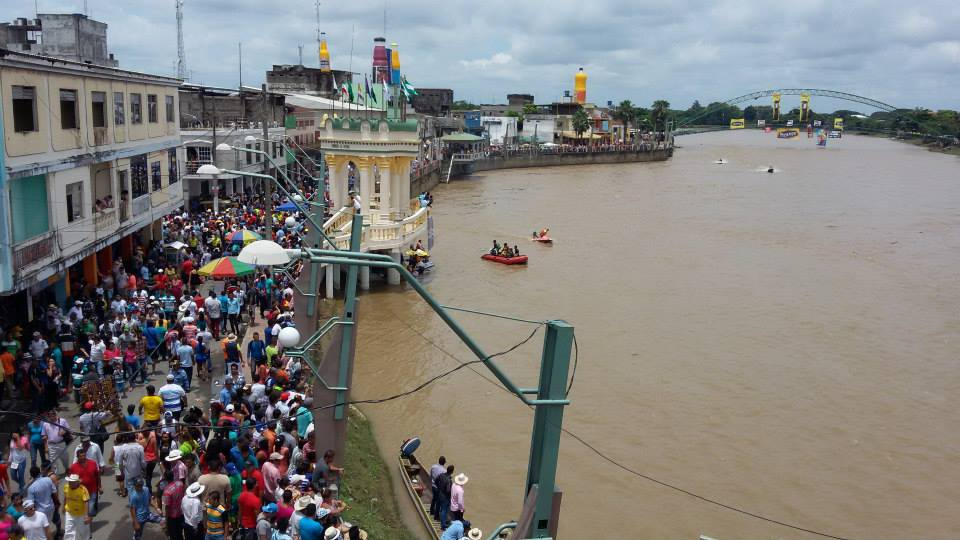
Vinces Regattas

The Vinces River is a river of western Ecuador.

== See also ==
- List of rivers of Ecuador
