= Subfamily =

Intermediate taxonomic rank below family

The hierarchy of biological classification's eight major taxonomic ranks. Intermediate minor rankings are not shown.

A subfamily (Latin: subfamilia, plural subfamiliae) is an auxiliary (intermediate) taxonomic rank, positioned below family and above genus. It is used to classify groups of related genera within a family, helping organize the diversity of life more precisely.

Standard nomenclature rules end botanical subfamily names with the suffix "-oideae", whereas zoological subfamily names end with "-inae". These suffixes help clearly identify the taxonomic rank in scientific literature and classification systems.

== Botanical subfamilies ==
An example of a botanical subfamily is Detarioideae, which is a subdivision of the Fabaceae (legume) family. It contains 84 genera and is characterized by specific floral and fruit traits.

== Zoological subfamilies ==
In zoology, Stevardiinae is an example of a subfamily within the Characidae family, a large and diverse group of freshwater fish. This subfamily includes many genera of fishes with complex reproductive behaviors. Molecular studies have helped clarify its classification.

== Nomenclature and classification rules ==
The International Code of Nomenclature for algae, fungi, and plants (ICN) provides the rules for botanical names, including those of subfamilies. The International Code of Zoological Nomenclature (ICZN) governs the naming of zoological taxa, including subfamilies, with specific rules about suffixes and hierarchical placement.

== Summary of nomenclature suffixes ==
- Botanical subfamilies: **-oideae** (e.g., Detarioideae)
- Zoological subfamilies: **-inae** (e.g., Stevardiinae)

== See also ==
- Rank (botany)
- Rank (zoology)
