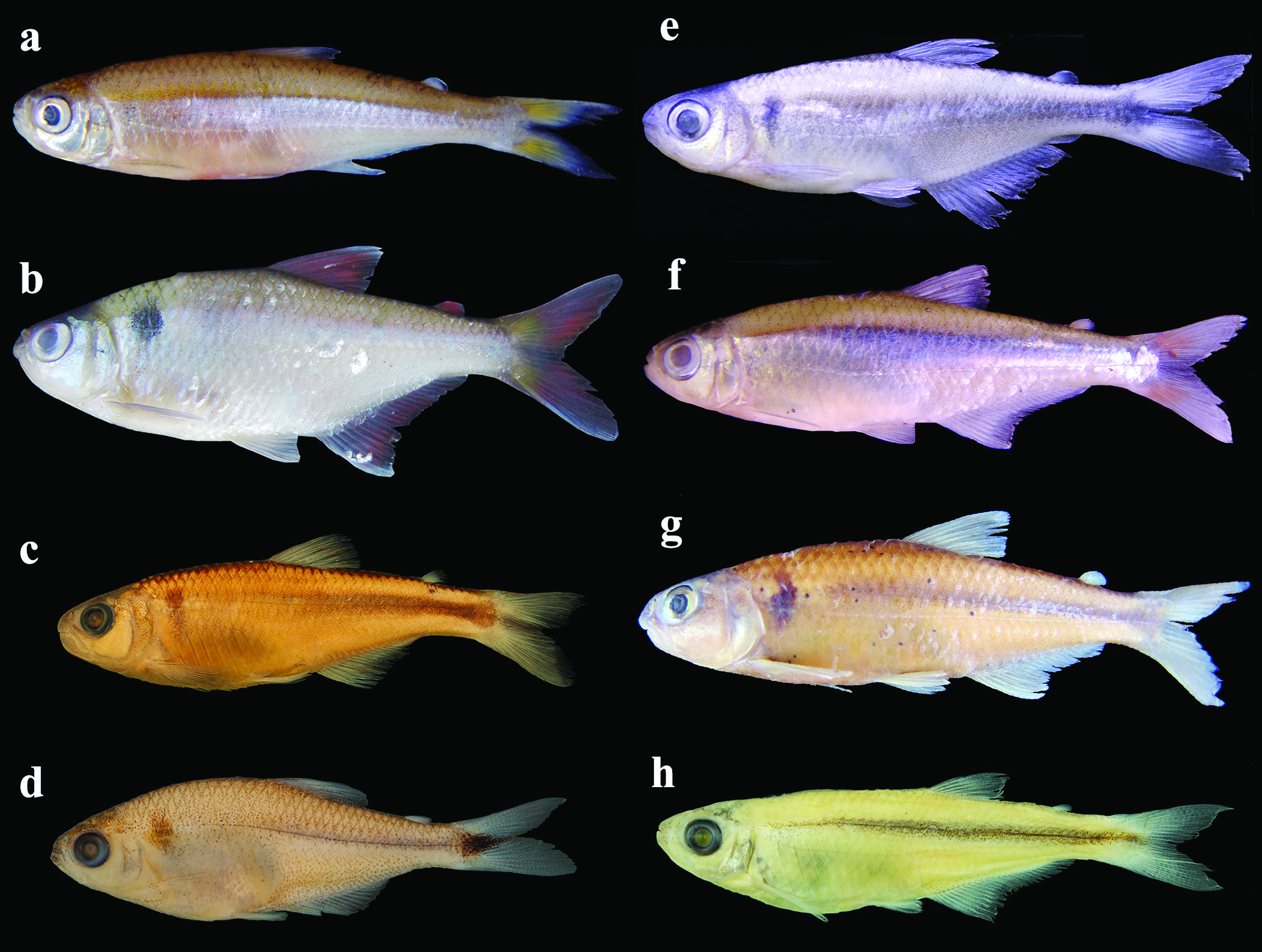
- Various stevardiid species from the Paraná River

Scientific classification
- Kingdom: Animalia
- Phylum: Chordata
- Class: Actinopterygii
- Order: Characiformes
- Suborder: Characoidei
- Family: Stevardiidae; Gill, 1858

Subfamilies
- Landoninae; Xenurobryconinae; Glandulocaudinae; Argopleurinae; Hemibryconinae; Stevardiinae; Planaltininae; Creagrutinae; Diapominae

= Stevardiidae =

Family of fishes

Stevardiidae is a large family of freshwater fish in the order Characiformes. It includes many genera previously placed in the family Characidae, which was split into multiple families in 2024. They are found throughout South and Central America. In earlier taxonomic treatments, most genera in this family were placed in the characid subfamily Glandulocaudinae, which has been redefined as a much smaller subfamily of the Stevardiidae.

As suggested by their former taxonomic name, a gland on their caudal fin is found almost exclusively in the males of many species of this family, which allows the release and pumping of pheromones. Members of this subfamily have complex courtship behaviors which lead to insemination. The ecology and life history of these fish is complex yet little studied. Stevardiids are important components of the diet for commercially-harvested larger fish.

== Taxonomy ==
The following taxonomy is based on Eschmeyer's Catalog of Fishes:

Family Stevardiidae

- Subfamily Landoninae Weitzman & Menezes, 1998 (caudal sac characins)
  - Eretmobrycon W. L. Fink, 1976
  - Landonia C. H. Eigenmann & Henn, 1914
  - Markiana C. H. Eigenmann, 1903
  - Phenacobrycon C. H. Eigenmann, 1922
- Subfamily Xenurobryconinae Myers & Böhlke, 1956 (xenurobryconines)
  - Iotabrycon Roberts, 1973
  - Ptychocharax Weitzman, S. V. Fink, Machado-Allison & Royero, 1994
  - Scopaeocharax Weitzman & S. V. Fink, 1985
  - Tyttocharax Fowler, 1913
  - Xenurobrycon Myers & P. Miranda Ribeiro, 1945
- Subfamily Glandulocaudinae C. H. Eigenmann, 1914 (chirping tetras)
  - Glandulocauda C. H. Eigenmann, 1911
  - Lophiobrycon R. M. C .Castro, A. C. Ribeiro, Benine & A. L. A. Melo, 2003
  - Mimagoniates Regan, 1907
- Subfamily Argopleurinae B. F. Melo & Oliveira, 2024 (Andean tetras)
  - Argopleura C. H. Eigenmann, 1913
- Subfamily Hemibryconinae Géry, 1966 (hemibryconines)
  - Acrobrycon C. H. Eigenmann & Pearson, 1924
  - Hemibrycon Günther, 1864
- Subfamily Stevardiinae Gill, 1858 (stevardiines)
  - Chrysobrycon Weitzman & Menezes, 1998
  - Corynopoma Gill, 1858
  - Gephyrocharax C. H. Eigenmann, 1912
  - Hysteronotus C. H. Eigenmann, 1911
  - Pseudocorynopoma Perugia, 1891
  - Pterobrycon Eigenmann, 1913
  - Varicharax Vanegas-Ríos, Faustino-Fuster, Meza-Vargas & Ortega, 2020
- Subfamily Planaltininae Oliveira & Souza, 2024 (Brazilian Shield tetras)
  - Planaltina Böhlke 1954
  - Lepidocharax K. M. Ferreira, Menezes & Quagio-Grassiotto, 2011
- Subfamily Creagrutinae Miles, 1943
  - Caiapobrycon L. R. Malabarba & Vari, 2000
  - Carlastyanax Géry, 1972
  - Creagrutus Günther, 1864
  - Microgenys C. H. Eigenmann 1913
- Subfamily Diapominae
  - Attonitus Vari & Ortega, 2000
  - Aulixidens Böhlke, 1952
  - Boehlkea Géry, 1966
  - Bryconacidnus Myers, 1929
  - Bryconamericus C. H. Eigenmann, 1907
  - Ceratobranchia C. H. Eigenmann, 1914
  - Diapoma Cope, 1894
  - Knodus C. H. Eigenmann, 1911
  - Monotocheirodon C. H. Eigenmann & Pearson, 1924
  - Othonocheirodus Myers, 1927
  - Phallobrycon Menezes, Ferreira & Netto-Ferreira, 2009
  - Piabarchus Myers, 1928
  - Piabina Reinhardt, 1867
  - Rhinobrycon Myers, 1944
  - Rhinopetitia Géry, 1964

== Distribution and habitat ==
Stevardiids occur in practically all major South American drainages. Along Pacific drainages, they are distributed from Costa Rica to Ecuador, and along Atlantic drainages, their range extends to northern Argentina. These fishes are found in every South American country, including Trinidad and excluding Chile; they inhabit streams that are tributaries to larger rivers such as the Amazon, Orinoco, and Paraguay Rivers in tropical species, or coastal streams tributary to the Atlantic and Pacific Oceans and the Caribbean Sea in the few subtropical species.

The habitats of these fish vary. A few species are known from elevations as high as 500–600 metres (1,600–2,000 ft), and Lophiobrycon weitzmani is known as high as 900 m (3,000 ft). Some species are confined to acidic black rainforest waters, and others are found in clearer, neutral to somewhat alkaline waters; a few species are even adapted to both kinds of waters. However, there are no brackish water species.

== Characteristics ==
Stevardiids are small, less than 13 centimetres (5 in). Most are between about 5–6 cm SL (about 2 in), but some species can be even smaller, between 11 and 30 millimetres (0.43 and 1.18 inches). The reproductive adaptations of stevardiids is what sets this group apart from the other Characins. Males have a caudal organ associated with gland tissues. Synapomorphies of this subfamily include insemination, a posterior sperm storage area in the testes, and an elongate sperm nucleus.

All males have some form of modified caudal gland used to release pheromones as part of courtship. The structure of this gland depends on the specific tribe; the organ may consist of modified caudal fin rays; modified caudal fin scales, a derived hypural fan, or modified caudal fin musculature, or combinations of the above. Modified scales may act as bellows in releasing chemicals into the water. A caudal fin ray pheromone pump, unique to subfamily Glandulocaudinae, consists of glandular tissue associated with modified scales and fin rays. The tribe Diapomini is the only tribe in which the caudal gland is equally developed in both the males and females.

Females of all stevardiid species are inseminated. The females produce fewer eggs per unit body weight than externally fertilizing species; this is possibly because insemination increases the efficiency of fertilization, so fewer eggs are necessary. This insemination is preceded by courtship in all species. After insemination, the female may retain the live sperm for many months in her ovaries. This allows the eggs to be laid when environmental conditions are favorable. However, there is no evidence of an intromittent organ, and the exact mechanism of insemination is unknown. Hooks on the anal fin of males may play a role, although these are also found in characins that exhibit external fertilization. It was originally believed that internal fertilization occurs in stevardiids. However, the exact time of fertilization is unknown and no fertilized eggs are found internally; this suggests fertilization occurs when the eggs are being laid or even outside of the body.

Due to insemination, the sperm of stevardiids has adapted. In many species, an elongate cytoplasmic collar binds the flagellum to the elongate nucleus at some stage of spermiogenesis. In almost all species, the sperm cell bodies are elongate. The genus Planaltina expresses only round sperm (like that of externally fertilizing characins) and the genera Diapoma and Acrobrycon only express slightly elongated sperm; this may indicate a possible plesiomorphy. Some sperm have enlarged regions containing mitochondria, which may help in prolonging the life of the sperm while stored in the ovary. In some genera, sperm clumping and patterns of arrangement are observed in the sperm ducts and storage regions. In the subfamilies Xenurobryconinae and Glandulocaudinae, there is a form of sperm packaging which would allow for a higher sperm density during transfer from the male to the female. These packets are called spermatozeugmata, and the sperm are packaged parallel to each other; this packaging is further increased by the elongation of the sperm cells. In Xenurobryconinae, each spermatozeugma is produced and is released fully formed in the spermatocysts, but in Glandulocaudinae, the sperm is released from the spermatocysts and packaged elsewhere. The spermatozeugmata are situated in the posterior end of the testes, which serves as a storage area for sperm.

Many of the genera also have a gland situated in the gill cavity called a "gill gland", a secondary sex characteristic found in sexually mature male stevardiids that is apparently suited to release chemical signals. No genus contains species that have glands and other species without glands. This gill gland is derived from anterior gill filaments of the first gill arch. Gland size and degree of gill modification varies with species. Though the true function of the gill glands has yet to be determined, they are probably used to release chemical signals into the gill current.

There are many examples of sexual dimorphism (differences in appearance between the genders). In Corynopoma riisei, the males have extended finnage (giving it the common name "swordtailed characin") as well as paddle-like extensions of the operculum. Many other species also have other secondary sex characteristics believed to be involved in courtship.

Many of these characteristics are also shared with the tribe Compsurini in Cheirodontinae. Though unrelated, this group contains inseminating species with caudal organs. However, the caudal organs and other similar characteristics are structured differently. They also share the elongate cytoplasmic collar binding the flagellum to the elongate nucleus at some stage of spermiogenesis, which was previously assumed to be exclusive to stevardiids. These fish also occasionally have gill glands.

== Courtship ==
Like other ostariophysans, stevardiids show a reaction to chemical signals in the water. Many ostariophysans have a fright reaction in response to an alarm substance. In Corynopoma riisei, it has been shown that a sexually mature male's presence actually inhibits the maturation of immature males. In C. riisei, the female is often situated parallel to and somewhat behind the male, which allows for chemical signals released from the male's gill glands to be carried directly to the female.

Stevardiids have complex courtship behavior. In C. riisei, the male has paddle-shaped extensions of the operculum which can be extended perpendicular to its body and twitches and flutters due to movements of his body; the female follows and nips at these projections during courtship.

A croaking behavior is recorded in some species of Mimagoniates. This behavior has a part in courtship as well. Courtship involves the male chasing and hovering near the female. As the male hovers, he will quickly swim to the surface and take a gulp of air and return, expelling the gas and making continuous, rhythmic pulses of croaking sounds, interrupted only by the male returning to the surface for more air. The fish also zigzags while hovering by swimming up and down, when the fish intends to resurface but does not. Croaking behavior may have evolved from a behavior called "nipping surface", a feeding behavior that occurs when the fish is searching for food; the fish often will gulp air when doing this. This gulping of air has no respiratory significance.

== In the aquarium ==
Some species of Stevardiidae are important in the aquarium trade. Herbert R. Axelrod has discussed the care of a number of species, including Corynopoma riisei, Gephyrocharax caucanus, Mimagoniates microlepis, M. lateralis, M. inequalis, Pseudocorynopoma doriae, and Tyttocharax madeirae. These species reach about 5–6 cm (about 2 in). However, T. madeirae reaches 2 cm (less than 1 in), while P. doriae reaches 8 cm (3 in). Like most tetras, they prefer to swim in schools; some species may be nippy, and should be kept in groups to divide aggression. Many species are very active and will almost constantly swim, which translates to a larger aquarium. They have been bred in captivity.

These fish may not be as easily weaned onto dry foods as other fish, and will appreciate live foods. Some species appreciate cooler water than the average tropical fish, so this should be kept in mind when maintaining some of these species. Also, many imported specimens, even if they seem healthy, may mysteriously waste away. Some species are delicate and are not easily collected or transported, or are rarely seen available.
