= A. abbreviatus =

A. abbreviatus may refer to:

- Acestrorhynchus abbreviatus, a fish in the family Acestrorhynchidae
- Acilius abbreviatus, a predaceous diving beetle
- Agrothereutes abbreviatus, a parasitic wasp
