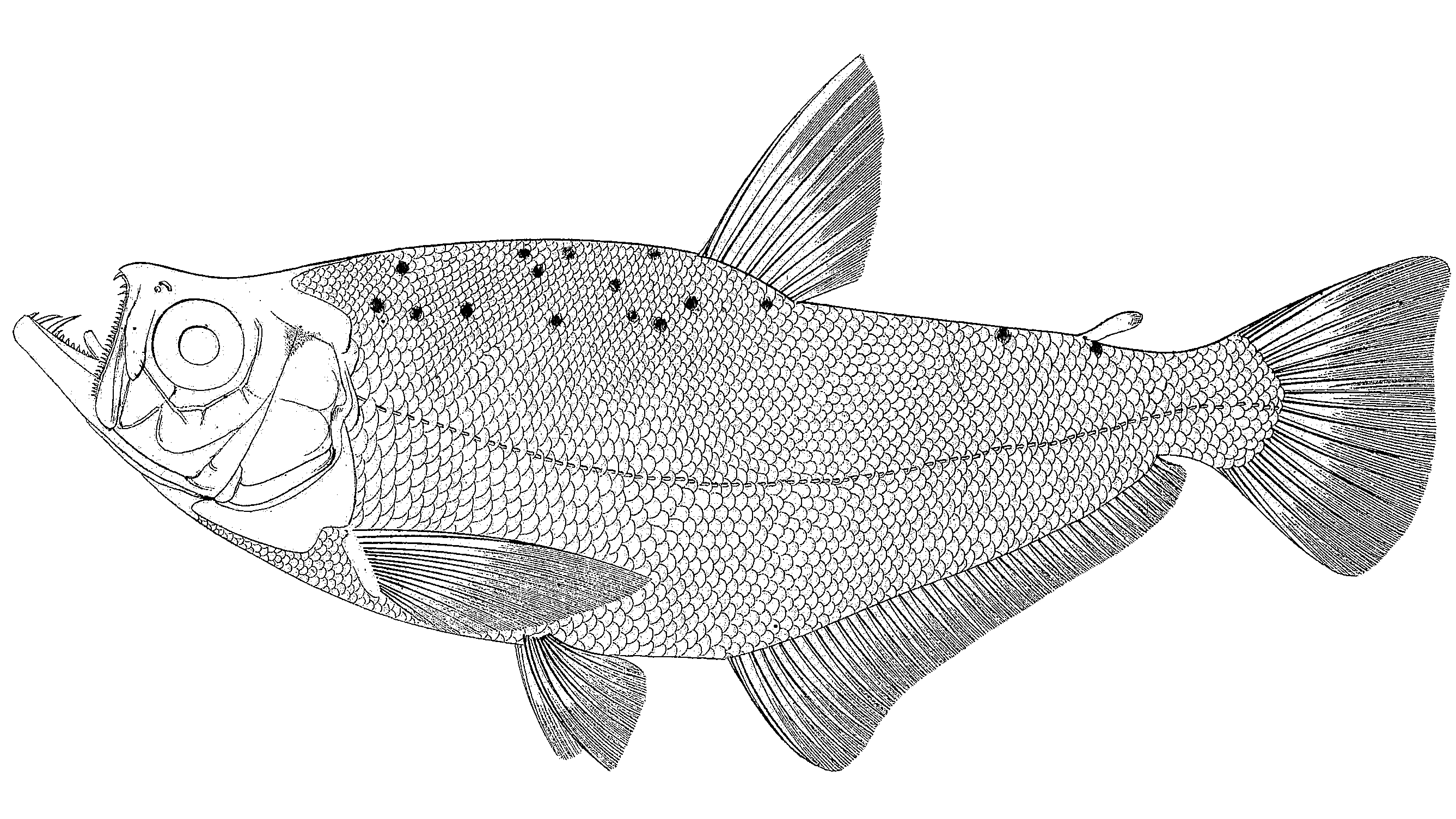
- Roestes molossus

Scientific classification
- Kingdom: Animalia
- Phylum: Chordata
- Class: Actinopterygii
- Order: Characiformes
- Family: Acestrorhynchidae
- Subfamily: Roestinae; Lucena & Menezes, 1998

Type genus
- Roestes Günther, 1864

= Roestinae =

Subfamily of fishes

Roestinae is a subfamily of freshwater ray-finned fishes belonging to the family Acestrorhynchidae. The fishes in this subfamily are known as biting tetras. These fishes are found in South America.

Until recently, the family Acestrorhynchidae contained only the genus Acestrorhynchus. However, taxonomic studies have found that the subfamilies Heterocharacinae (originally placed in the closely related Characidae) and Roestinae (originally placed in the more distantly related Cynodontidae) are actually more closely related to Acestrorhynchus, and now they are also placed in this family.

== Genera ==
Roestinae contains the following genera:

- Gilbertolus C. H. Eigenmann, 1907
- Roestes Günther, 1864
