= Acestrorhynchus altus =

Conservation status
- Data Deficient (IUCN 3.1)

Scientific classification
- Kingdom: Animalia
- Phylum: Chordata
- Class: Actinopterygii
- Order: Characiformes
- Family: Acestrorhynchidae
- Genus: Acestrorhynchus
- Species: A. altus

Binomial name
- Acestrorhynchus altus Menezes, 1969

Species of fish

Acestrorhynchus altus is a species of freshwater ray-finned fish belonging to the family Acestrorhynchidae, the freshwater barracudas. It was described by Naércio Aquino de Menezes in 1969. It inhabits the Amazon River basin, at a pH range of 5.5-7.2. It reaches a maximum standard length of 23.3 cm (9.2 in).

A. altus feeds off of bony fish.
