= Acestrorhynchus britskii =

Conservation status
- Least Concern (IUCN 3.1)

Scientific classification
- Kingdom: Animalia
- Phylum: Chordata
- Class: Actinopterygii
- Order: Characiformes
- Family: Acestrorhynchidae
- Genus: Acestrorhynchus
- Species: A. britskii

Binomial name
- Acestrorhynchus britskii Menezes, 1969

Species of fish

Acestrorhynchus britskii is a species of freshwater ray-finned fish belonging to the family Acestrorhynchidae, the freshwater barracudas. It was described by Naércio Aquino de Menezes in 1969. It inhabits the São Francisco river in Brazil. It reaches a maximum standard length of 16.5 cm (6.5 in).

The fish is named in honor of ichthyologist Heraldo A. Britski with the Departamento de Zoologia, Secretaria de Agricultura, in São Paulo, Brazil, who collected the type specimen.
