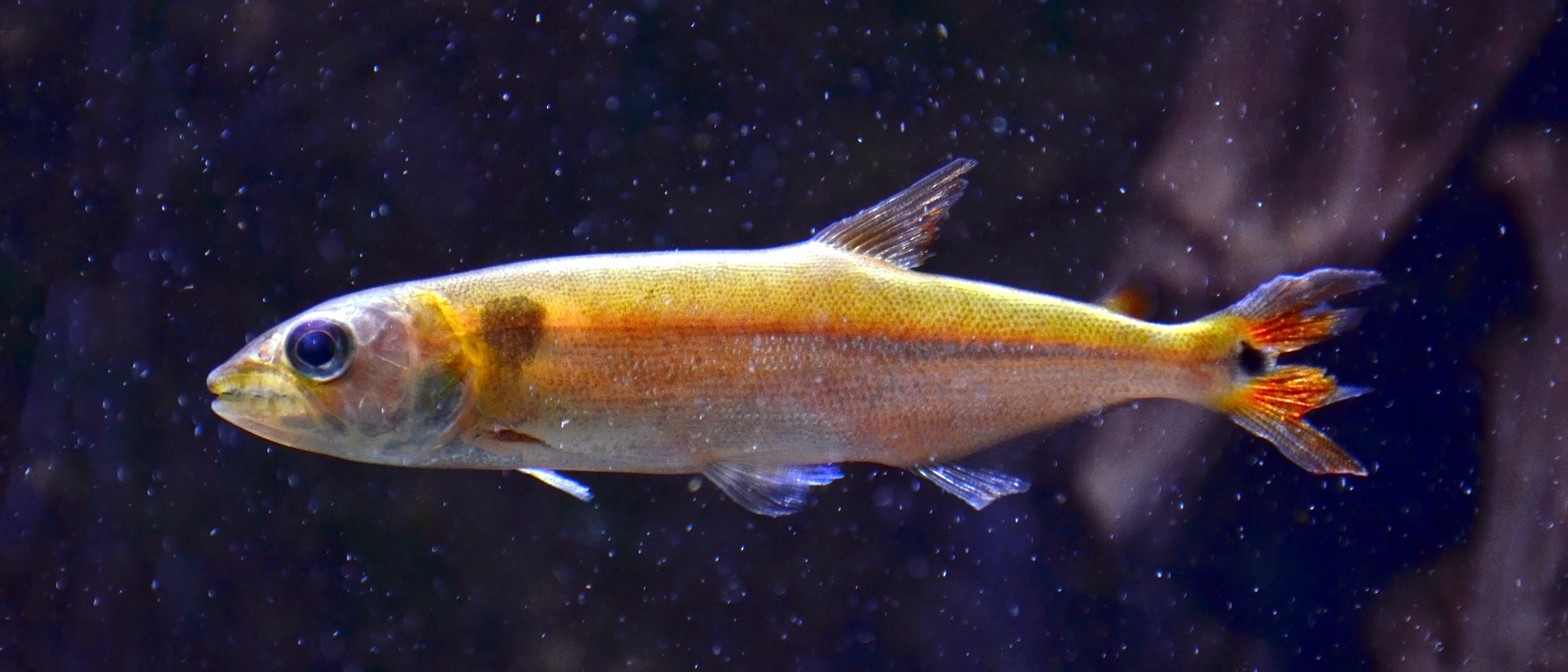

Conservation status
- Least Concern (IUCN 3.1)

Scientific classification
- Kingdom: Animalia
- Phylum: Chordata
- Class: Actinopterygii
- Order: Characiformes
- Family: Acestrorhynchidae
- Genus: Acestrorhynchus
- Species: A. falcatus

Binomial name
- Acestrorhynchus falcatus (Bloch, 1794)

Synonyms
- Salmo falcatus Bloch, 1794; Salmo pulverulentus Linnaeus, 1758; Xiphorhamphus ferox Günther, 1863; Acestrorhynchus falcatus varius Menezes, 1969

= Acestrorhynchus falcatus =

Species of fish

Acestrorhynchus falcatus is a species of freshwater ray-finned fish belonging to the family Acestrorhynchidae, the freshwater barracudas. It was described by Marcus Elieser Bloch in 1794, originally under the genus Salmo. It is the type species of the genus Acestrorhynchus. It inhabits the Orinoco and Amazon River systems and the regions of Suriname, Guyana, and French Guiana. It reaches a maximum total length of 30 cm (12 in), and a maximum weight of 255 g (9.0 oz).

Acestrorhynchus falcatus feeds on finfish. It is of minor interest to commercial fisheries.
