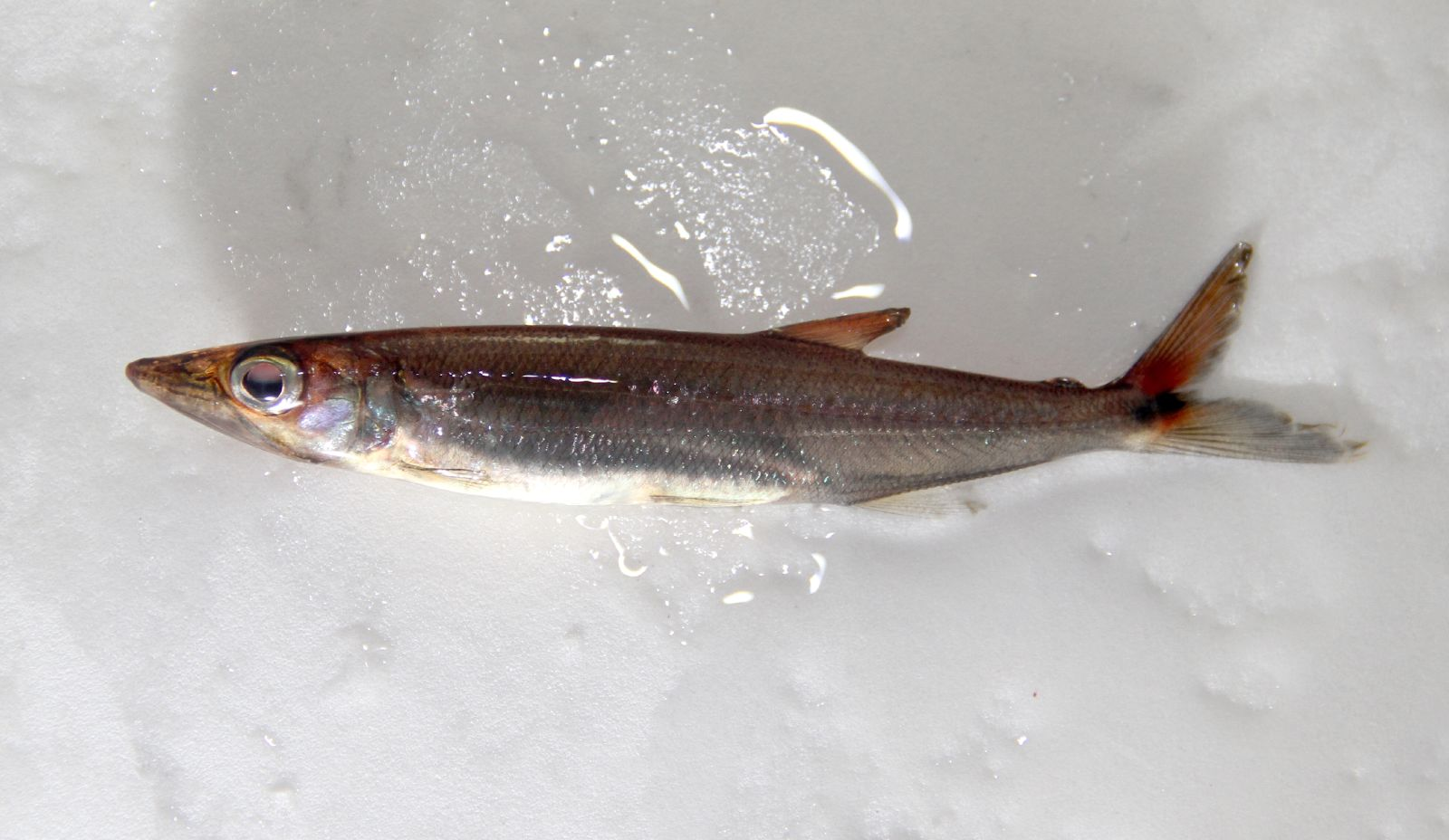

Conservation status
- Least Concern (IUCN 3.1)

Scientific classification
- Kingdom: Animalia
- Phylum: Chordata
- Class: Actinopterygii
- Order: Characiformes
- Family: Acestrorhynchidae
- Genus: Acestrorhynchus
- Species: A. minimus

Binomial name
- Acestrorhynchus minimus Menezes 1969

= Acestrorhynchus minimus =

Species of fish

Acestrorhynchus minimus is a species of freshwater ray-finned fish belonging to the family Acestrorhynchidae, the freshwater barracudas. It was described by Naércio Aquino de Menezes in 1969. It inhabits the Orinoco and Amazon Rivers. It reaches a maximum standard length of 6.3 cm (2.5 in).
