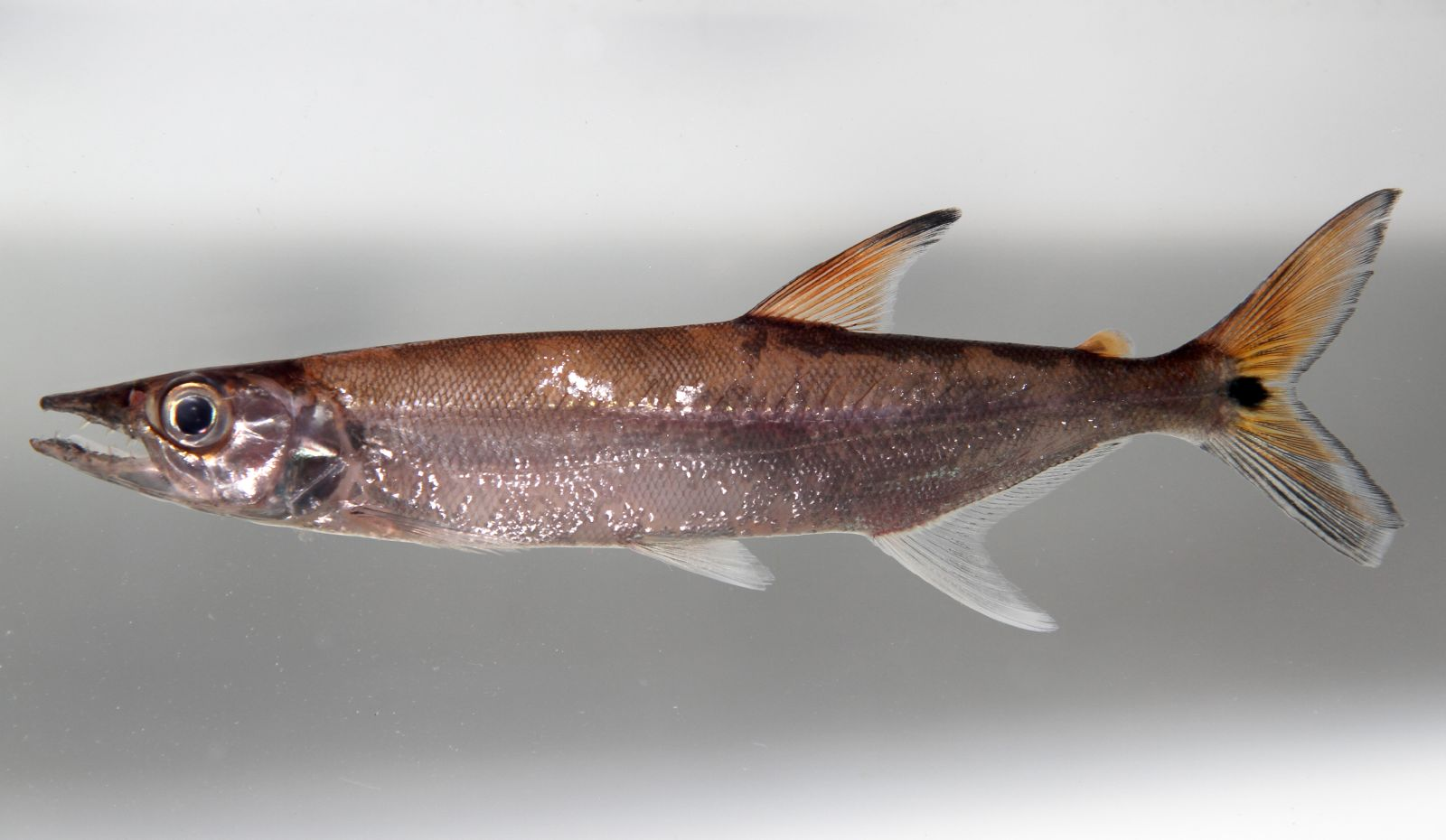
- Acestrorhynchus microlepis

Conservation status
- Least Concern (IUCN 3.1)

Scientific classification
- Kingdom: Animalia
- Phylum: Chordata
- Class: Actinopterygii
- Order: Characiformes
- Family: Acestrorhynchidae
- Genus: Acestrorhynchus
- Species: A. microlepis

Binomial name
- Acestrorhynchus microlepis (Jardine, 1841)

Synonyms
- Hydrocyon microlepis Jardine, 1841; Acestrorhynchus cachorro Fowler, 1940; Acestrorhynchus guianensis Menezes, 1969; Acestrorhynchus apurensis Toledo-Piza & Menezes, 1996

= Pike characin =

Species of fish

The pike characin (Acestrorhynchus microlepis) is a species of freshwater ray-finned fish belonging to the family Acestrorhynchidae, the freshwater barracudas. It was described by Sir William Jardine, 7th Baronet in 1841, originally under the genus Hydrocyon. It inhabits the Orinoco and Amazon Rivers and the regions of Suriname, Guyana and French Guiana, at a pH range of 5.5-6.5. It reaches a maximum total length of 37 cm (15 in), and a maximum weight of 230 g (8.1 oz).

The pike characin feeds on bony fish. It is marketed for the aquarium hobby.
