= Acestrorhynchus maculipinna =

Conservation status
- Data Deficient (IUCN 3.1)

Scientific classification
- Kingdom: Animalia
- Phylum: Chordata
- Class: Actinopterygii
- Order: Characiformes
- Family: Acestrorhynchidae
- Genus: Acestrorhynchus
- Species: A. maculipinna

Binomial name
- Acestrorhynchus maculipinna Menezes & Géry, 1983

Species of fish

Acestrorhynchus maculipinna is a species of freshwater ray-finned fish belonging to the family Acestrorhynchidae, the freshwater barracudas. It was described by Naércio Aquino de Menezes and Jacques Géry in 1983. It inhabits the Amazon River. It reaches a maximum standard length of 7.9 cm (3.1 in).

A. maculipinna is currently ranked as Data Deficient by the IUCN redlist, owing to postulation that the species is not at great risk of being threatened, due to a lack of fishing in large areas of its region, and the apparent robust health of its environment.
