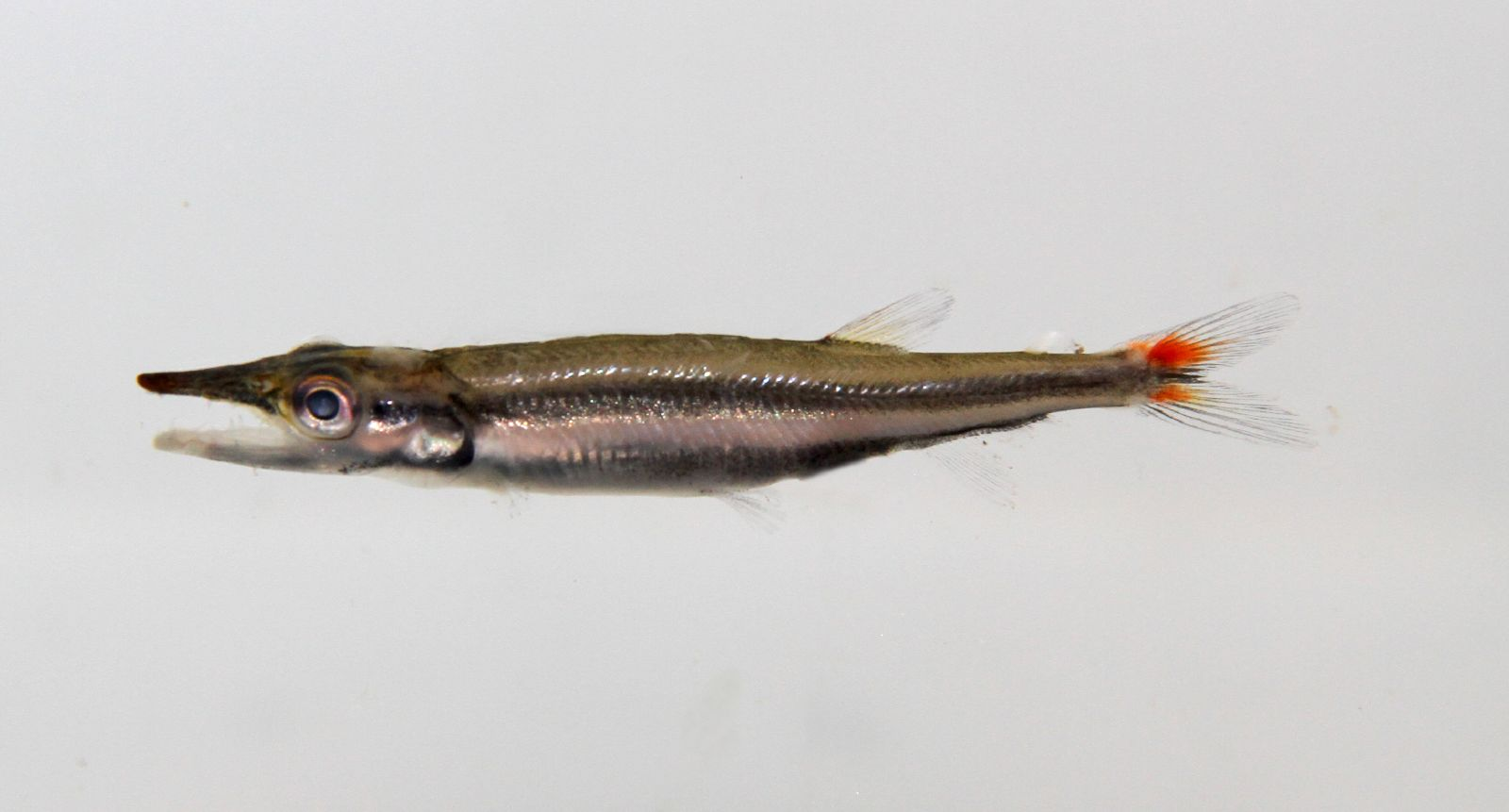

Conservation status
- Least Concern (IUCN 3.1)

Scientific classification
- Kingdom: Animalia
- Phylum: Chordata
- Class: Actinopterygii
- Order: Characiformes
- Family: Acestrorhynchidae
- Genus: Acestrorhynchus
- Species: A. nasutus

Binomial name
- Acestrorhynchus nasutus C. H. Eigenmann, 1912

= Acestrorhynchus nasutus =

Species of fish

Acestrorhynchus nasutus s a species of freshwater ray-finned fish belonging to the family Acestrorhynchidae, the freshwater barracudas. It was described by Carl H. Eigenmann in 1912. It inhabits the Orinoco and Amazon Rivers, as well as rivers in Guyana. It reaches a maximum standard length of 6.9 cm (2.7 in).
