= Acestrorhynchus isalineae =

Conservation status
- Least Concern (IUCN 3.1)

Scientific classification
- Kingdom: Animalia
- Phylum: Chordata
- Class: Actinopterygii
- Order: Characiformes
- Family: Acestrorhynchidae
- Genus: Acestrorhynchus
- Species: A. isalineae

Binomial name
- Acestrorhynchus isalineae Menezes & Géry, 1983

Species of fish

Acestrorhynchus isalineae is a species of freshwater ray-finned fish belonging to the family Acestrorhynchidae, the freshwater barracudas. It was described by Naércio Aquino de Menezes and Jacques Géry in 1983. It is known from the Madeira River in Brazil. It reaches a maximum standard length of 10.1 cm (4.0 in).

The fish was named in honor of Isaline Drecq, wife of Guy van den Bossche, who was a participant in the expedition that collected the type specimens.
