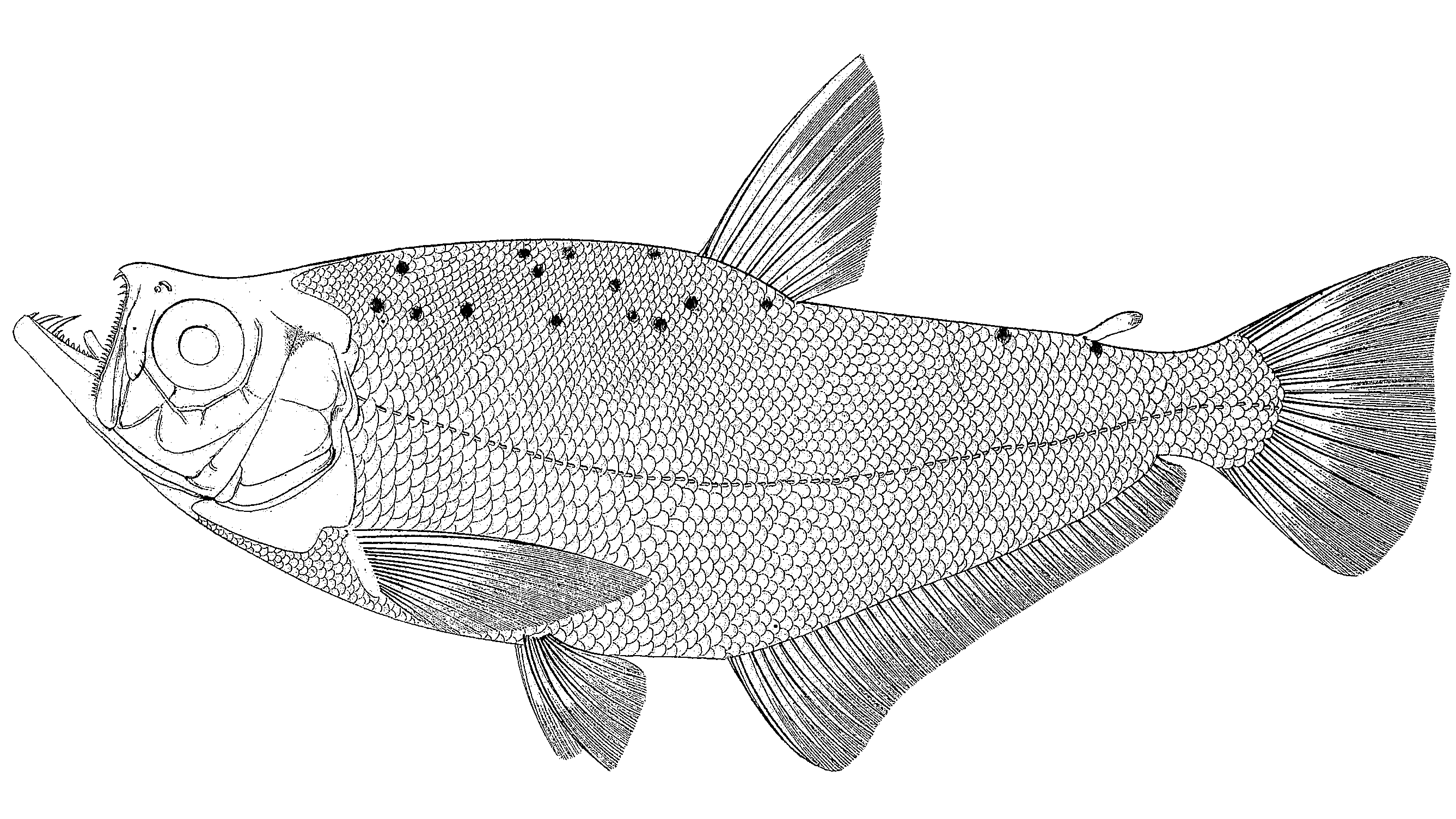
- Roestes molossus

Scientific classification
- Kingdom: Animalia
- Phylum: Chordata
- Class: Actinopterygii
- Order: Characiformes
- Family: Acestrorhynchidae
- Subfamily: Roestinae
- Genus: Roestes; Günther, 1864

Type species
- Cynopotamus molossus Kner, 1858

= Roestes =

Genus of fishes

Roestes is a genus of freshwater ray-finned fishes belonging to the family Acestrorhynchidae, which includes the biting tetras and freshwater barracudas. The fishes in this genus are from tropical South America, where they are found in the Amazon Basin and various rivers in the Guianas.

== Species ==
Roestes contains the following valid species:

- Roestes itupiranga Menezes & C. A. S. de Lucena, 1998
- Roestes molossus (Kner, 1858)
- Roestes ogilviei (Fowler, 1914)
