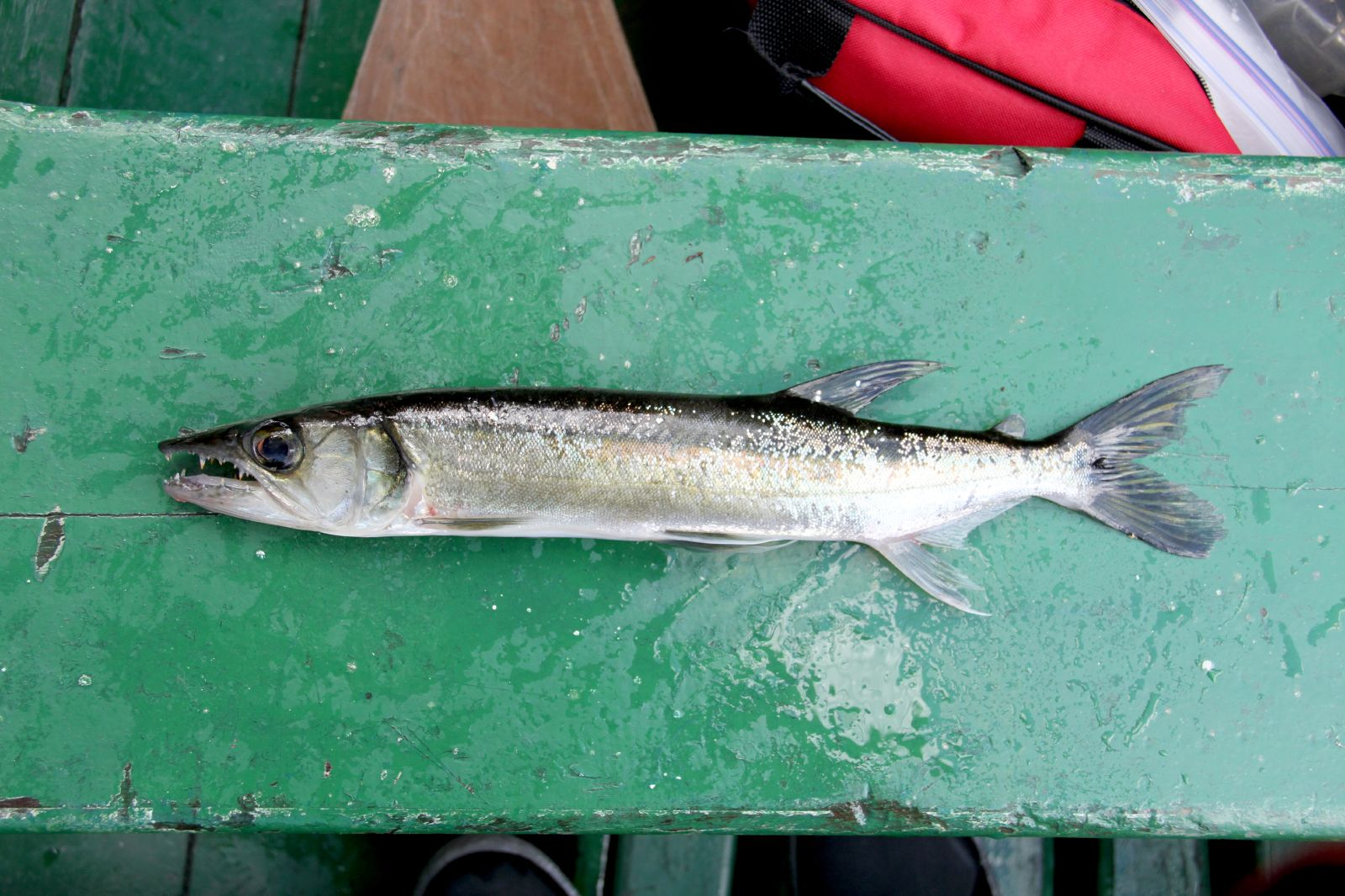

Conservation status
- Least Concern (IUCN 3.1)

Scientific classification
- Kingdom: Animalia
- Phylum: Chordata
- Class: Actinopterygii
- Order: Characiformes
- Family: Acestrorhynchidae
- Genus: Acestrorhynchus
- Species: A. falcirostris

Binomial name
- Acestrorhynchus falcirostris (Cuvier, 1819)

Synonyms
- Hydrocyon falcirostris Cuvier, 1819

= Acestrorhynchus falcirostris =

Species of fish

Acestrorhynchus falcirostris is a species of freshwater ray-finned fish belonging to the family Acestrorhynchidae, the freshwater barracudas. It was described by Georges Cuvier in 1819, originally under the genus Hydrocyon. It inhabits the Orinoco and Amazon Rivers in the area of Guyana, at a pH range of 5.2–7.2, and a dH range of 5–18. It reaches a maximum standard length of 45 cm (18 in).

The diet of A. falcirostris includes finfish, shrimp and insects. It is harvested by commercial fisheries, and is also sold to public aquariums.
