= Local extinction =

Disappearance of a species from a specific area

Local extinction, also known by biologists and ecologists as extirpation, refers to the complete disappearance of a species (or other taxon) from a specified geographic area, region, or habitat while that species continues to survive in some other part of the world. Local extinctions are contrasted with global extinctions in which the species no longer lives anywhere worldwide.

Local extinctions often mark a change in the ecology of the affected area, such as a species disappearing due to introduction of a competing species from another location, such as with wolf reintroduction.

== Causes of local extinction ==
Local extinction occurs when environmental changes reduce a species' ability to survive in the particular habitat. Habitats may be changed, or even destroyed, by numerous natural processes or by human activity, with one or more local extinctions being a consequence. Some of these processes are described below.

When habitats are destroyed or changed, by human activity or by natural processes, species populations may decline and then completely disappear from the affected region. Habitat fragmentation, in which a large continuous area is broken into a series of smaller isolated habitats can also contribute to local extinction by dividing continuous and connected habitats into smaller and more isolated patches. The isolation and reduction of habitat size can result in reducing total population size, slowing of movement between a set of smaller populations, and reduced genetic diversity for each sub-population which, in turn, increases risk of a major population collapse.

Changes of natural ecosystems for agriculture, urban development, or other human activities are a significant cause of habitat destruction. Overexploitation of a species can also contribute to local extinction, due to members of a species being removed from a region faster than their ability to reproduce and recover. Overfishing, hunting, and poaching can reduce a population enough to make it more vulnerable to extinction in specific regions. Some species have been deliberately or systematically exterminated from both large and small geographical areas, for reasons including pest reduction, elimination of threats to agriculture and farming.

Climate change increasingly impact species survival as changes in temperature, precipitation patterns, and severe weather impacts ecosystems. Smaller, declining, or isolated populations are more prone to extinction than large stable populations.

A range of geological processes can also result in local extinctions, due to significant disturbances of natural habitats such as reforming land and sea features, exposure, introduction of toxic gases, and temporary or enduring temperature change. For example, glaciation during the Pleistocene glaciation event in North America resulted in death of most native North American species of earthworm due to glaciers covering a significant geographic area, leaving the region subsequently open for colonization by European earthworms transported in soil from Europe. Volcanic activity may also lead to significant numbers of local extinctions and possibly subsequent repopulation.

The size of any geographic area affects the number of species, and the total population size, that it can sustain. This is particularly relevant for islands, where rise and fall of surrounding water changes a range of habitats, causing local extinctions or even, in cases of island endemism, outright extinction. Numerous examples of this occurred at the end of the Pleistocene period.

== Metapopulation dynamics ==
Metapopulation dynamics describe a model of how species survive across fragmented habitats and, conversely, how local extinction occurs. A metapopulation refers to a group of spatially separated populations of a single species that live in distinct habitats with some interconnected due to migration or dispersal. Species survival across different regions often depends on the specific balance and interaction between local extinction and recolonization events, in which populations may disappear from one habitat but be re-established due to individuals migrating from nearby populations.

Habitat fragmentation can create connected networks causing some smaller populations to interact with each other, and the long term persistence of the species depends on the movement of the individuals species between habitats. Interruptions in dispersal between habitats increases the risk of permanent local extinction.

== Extinction debt ==
Extinction debt refers to the existence of a species in an ecosystem despite a loss of habitat or other ecosystem features necessary for survival. A species may remain present in a habitat for a significant time after environmental degradation, after ecological changes have lowered their chance of long term survival.

== Extinction risk ==
Extinction risk is the probability that a species will disappear from a specific region based on ecological, biological and other environmental factors. Evaluations of extinction risk account for variables such as population size, geographic range, availability of habitat, and biological traits of a species. Biological characteristics have a strong impact on extinction risk. Species with a small geographic range, slow life histories or expectancies, and higher tropic levels have the greatest vulnerability to extinction compared to species with wider distributions and faster reproductive rates.

Environmental pressures such as habitat loss, habitat fragmentation and negative human interactions are causes of increased local extinction risk. Extinction risk occurs when external pressures interact with the species' biological characteristics. Predictive models and comparative analyses can identify which species have the highest extinction risk and are the most likely to experience future population falls and local extinction. Extinction risk allows researchers and conservation authorities to prioritize species that need the most protection from local extinction. By identifying species with the highest extinction risk, conservation strategies can be centered in protecting habitats, stabilizing populations, and slowing down the threats that lead to extinction.

Collection of statistics for populations of species in areas gives data that can inform development and usage of models to characterize how populations of various species evolve in a given region over time. Such models may be used to predict risk of extinctions from protected wilderness areas and national parks, and even plan remediation efforts, allowing for certain species being more prone to extinction than others, described in terms of an intrinsic extinction-ability (incidence function).

== Miscellaneous observations ==
Some species exploit or require transient or disturbed habitats, such as vernal pools, a human gut, or burnt woodland after forest fires. These species are characterized by highly fluctuating population numbers and shifting distributional patterns. Many natural ecosystems cycle through a standard succession, pioneer species disappear from a region as the ecosystem matures and reaches a climax community.

A local extinction can be useful for research: in the case of the bay checkerspot butterfly, scientists, including Paul R. Ehrlich, chose not to intervene as a population disappeared from an area in order to study the process.

Many crocodilian species have experienced localized extinction, particularly the saltwater crocodile (Crocodylus porosus), which has been extirpated from Vietnam, Thailand, Java and many other areas.

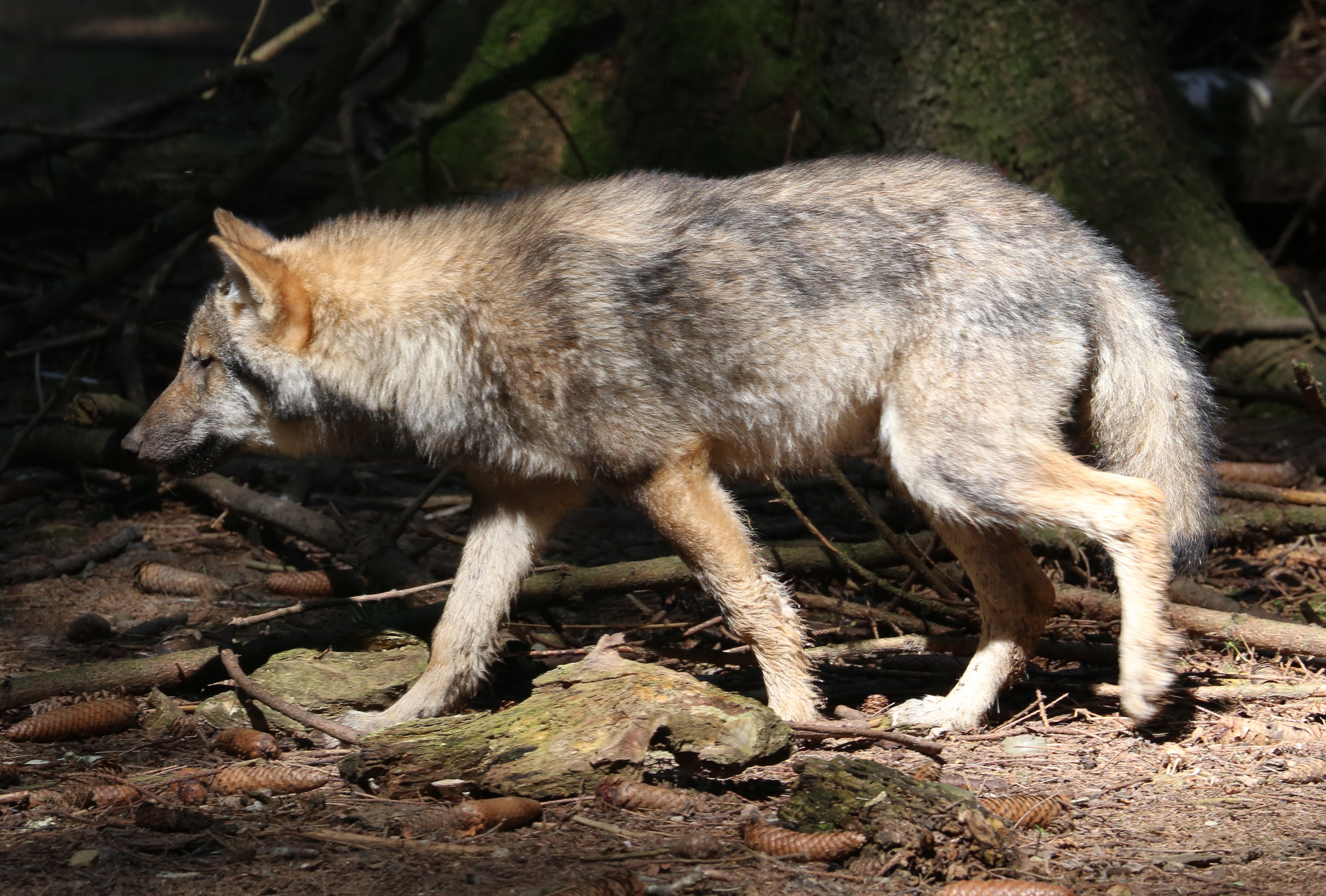
Canis lupus

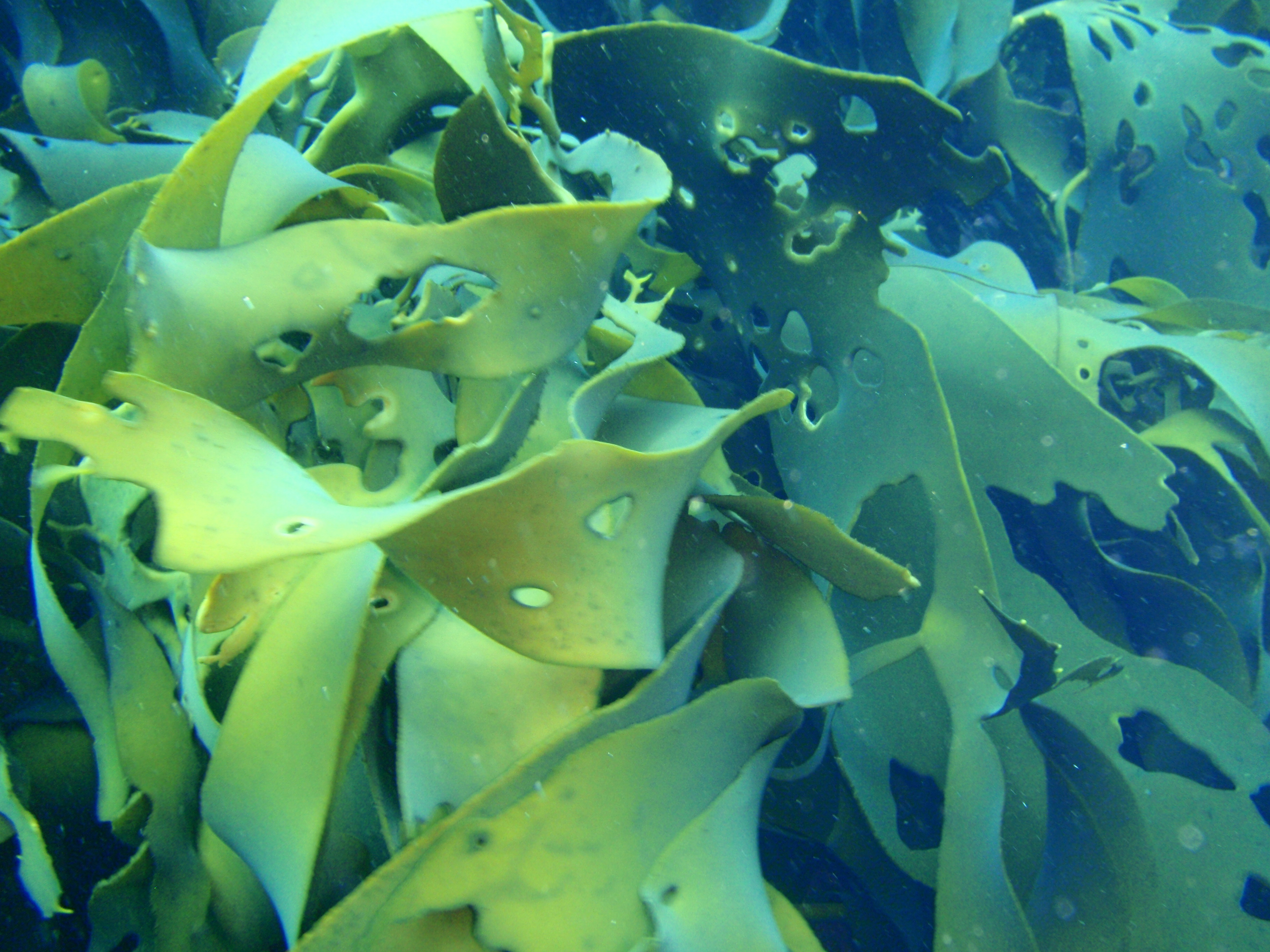
Bull kelp

Heat waves can lead to local extinction. In New Zealand, during the summer of 2017–2018, sea surface temperatures around parts of South Island exceeded 23 °C (73 °F), which was well above normal. Air temperatures were also high, exceeding 30 °C (86 °F). These high temperatures, coupled with small wave height, led to the local extinction of bull kelp (Durvillaea spp.) from Pile Bay.

Lagoa Santa, a lake in Lagoa Santa, Brazil, has lost almost 70% of the local fish species over the last 150 years. These include Acestrorhynchus lacustris, Astyanax fasciatus, and Characidium zebra. This could be caused by the introduction of non-native species, such as Tilapia rendalli, into the lagoon, changes in water level and organic pollution.

Local extinctions can be reversed, in some cases artificially. Wolves are a species that have been reintroduced into parts of their historical range. This has happened with red wolves (Canis rufus) in the United States in the late 1980s and also grey wolves in Yellowstone National Park in the mid-1990s. There have been talks of reintroducing wolves in Scotland, Japan, and Mexico.

Extirpation is used as a synonym for local extinction by biologists and ecologists. This differs from common-usage definitions, in English-language dictionaries, of extirpation as a deliberate process of eradication, elimination, wiping out, destroying, excision, or getting rid of an entity or concept The common usage meaning is consistent with the Latin root extirpationem (meaning to "root out").

== Subpopulations and stocks ==
When the local population of a certain species disappears from a certain geographical delimitation, whether fish in a drying pond or an entire ocean, it can be said to be extirpated or locally extinct in that pond or ocean.

A particular total world population can be more or less arbitrarily divided into 'stocks' or 'subpopulations', defined by political or other geographical delimitations. For example, the Cetacean Specialist Group of the International Union for Conservation of Nature (IUCN) has assessed the conservation status of the Black Sea stock of harbour porpoise (Phocoena phocoena) that touches six countries, and COSEWIC, which only assesses the conservation status of wildlife in Canada, even assesses Canadian species that occur in the United States or other countries.

While the IUCN mostly only assesses the global conservation status of species or subspecies, in some older cases it also assessed the risks to certain stocks and populations, in some cases these populations may be genetically distinct. In all, 119 stocks or subpopulations across 69 species had been assessed by the IUCN in 2006. If a local stock or population becomes extinct, the species as a whole has not become extinct, but extirpated from that local area.

Examples of stocks and subdivisions of world populations assessed separately by the IUCN for their conservation status are:

- Marsh deer (three populations assessed)
- Blue whale, North Pacific and North Atlantic stocks
- Bowhead whale, Balaena mysticetus (five populations assessed, from critically endangered to LR/cd)
- Lake sturgeon, Acipenser fulvescens, Mississippi & Missouri Basins population assessed as vulnerable
- Wild common carp, Cyprinus carpio (distribution in the River Danube)
- Black-flanked rock-wallaby Petrogale lateralis (MacDonnell Ranges population and Western Kimberly population)

The IUCN also lists countries where assessed species, subspecies or geographic populations are found, and from which countries they have been extirpated or reintroduced.

== See also ==
- List of extinct animals
- Threatened species
- Extinct in the wild
