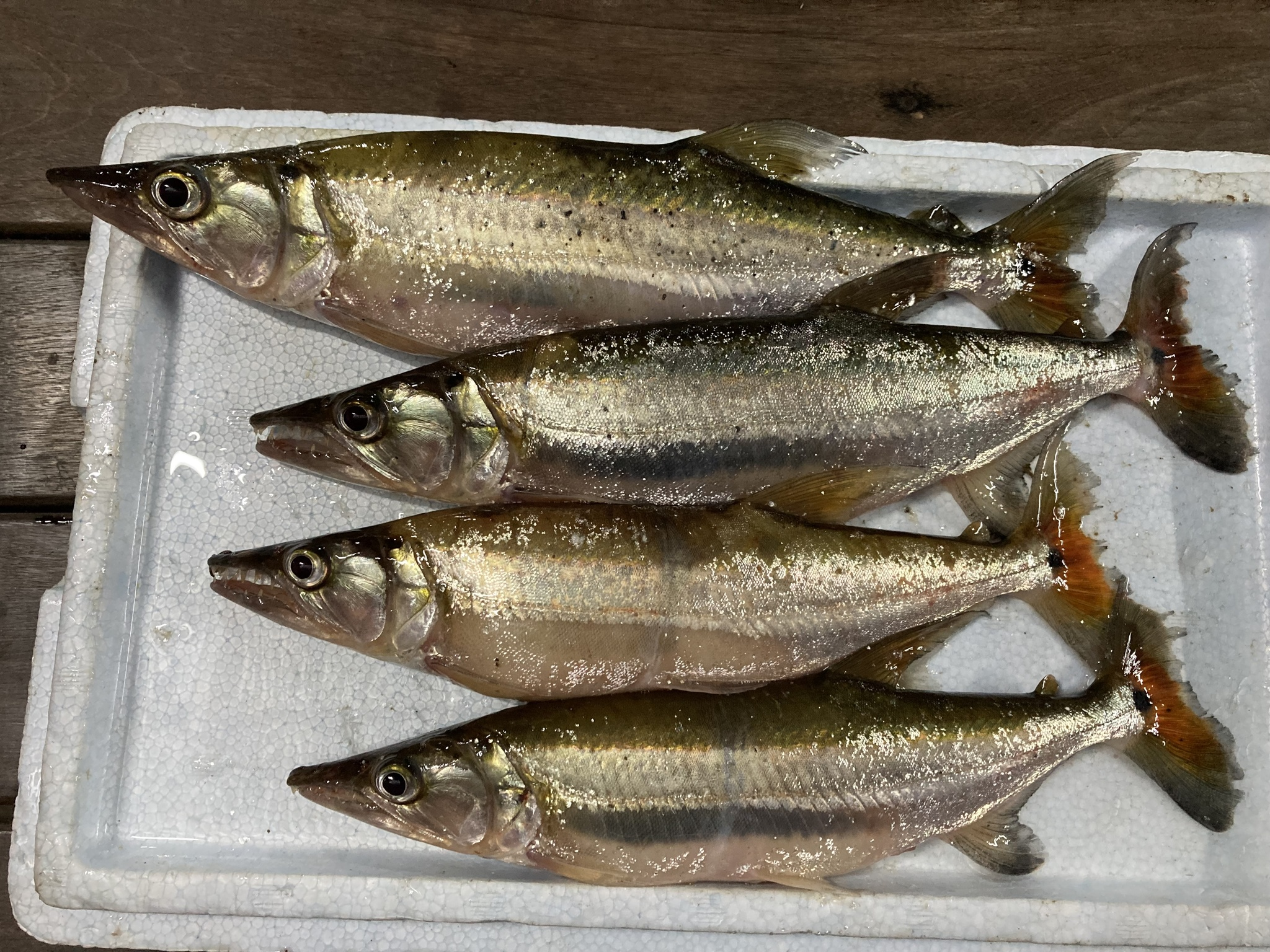

Conservation status
- Least Concern (IUCN 3.1)

Scientific classification
- Kingdom: Animalia
- Phylum: Chordata
- Class: Actinopterygii
- Order: Characiformes
- Family: Acestrorhynchidae
- Genus: Acestrorhynchus
- Species: A. heterolepis

Binomial name
- Acestrorhynchus heterolepis (Cope, 1878)

Synonyms
- Xiphorhamphus heterolepis Cope, 1878

= Acestrorhynchus heterolepis =

Species of fish

Acestrorhynchus heterolepis is a species of freshwater ray-finned fish belonging to the family Acestrorhynchidae, the freshwater barracudas. It was described by Edward Drinker Cope in 1878, originally under the genus Xiphorhamphus. It inhabits the Amazon, Negro and Orinoco Rivers. It reaches a maximum standard length of 40.8 cm (16.1 in).

A. heterolepis feeds on bony fish.
