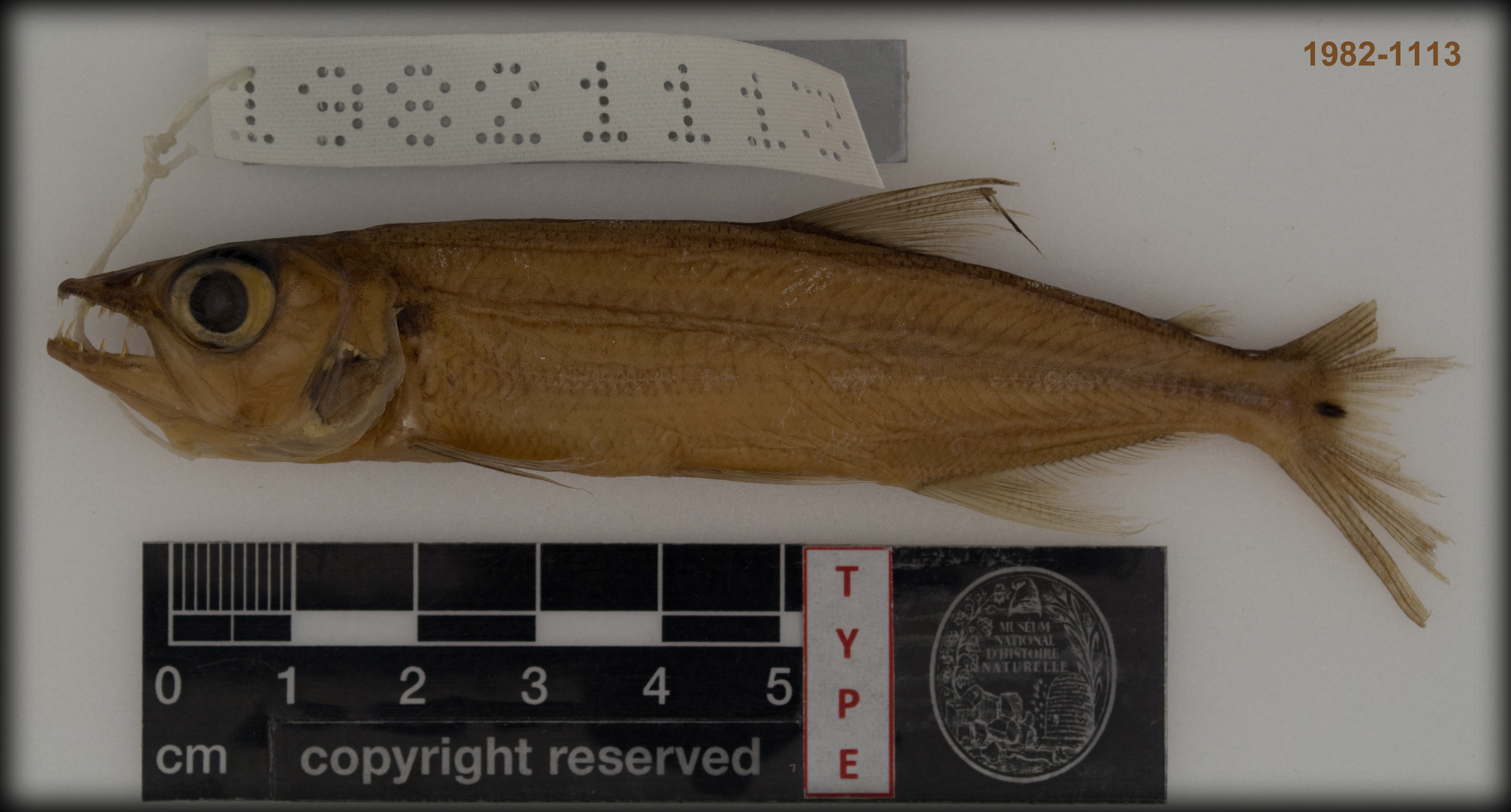

Conservation status
- Least Concern (IUCN 3.1)

Scientific classification
- Kingdom: Animalia
- Phylum: Chordata
- Class: Actinopterygii
- Order: Characiformes
- Family: Acestrorhynchidae
- Genus: Acestrorhynchus
- Species: A. grandoculis

Binomial name
- Acestrorhynchus grandoculis Menezes & Géry, 1983

= Acestrorhynchus grandoculis =

Species of fish

Acestrorhynchus grandoculis is a species of freshwater ray-finned fish belonging to the family Acestrorhynchidae, the freshwater barracudas. It was described by Naércio Aquino de Menezes and Jacques Géry in 1983. It inhabits the Amazon, Negro and Orinoco Rivers. It reaches a maximum standard length of 10.8 cm (4.3 in).

== Gallery ==
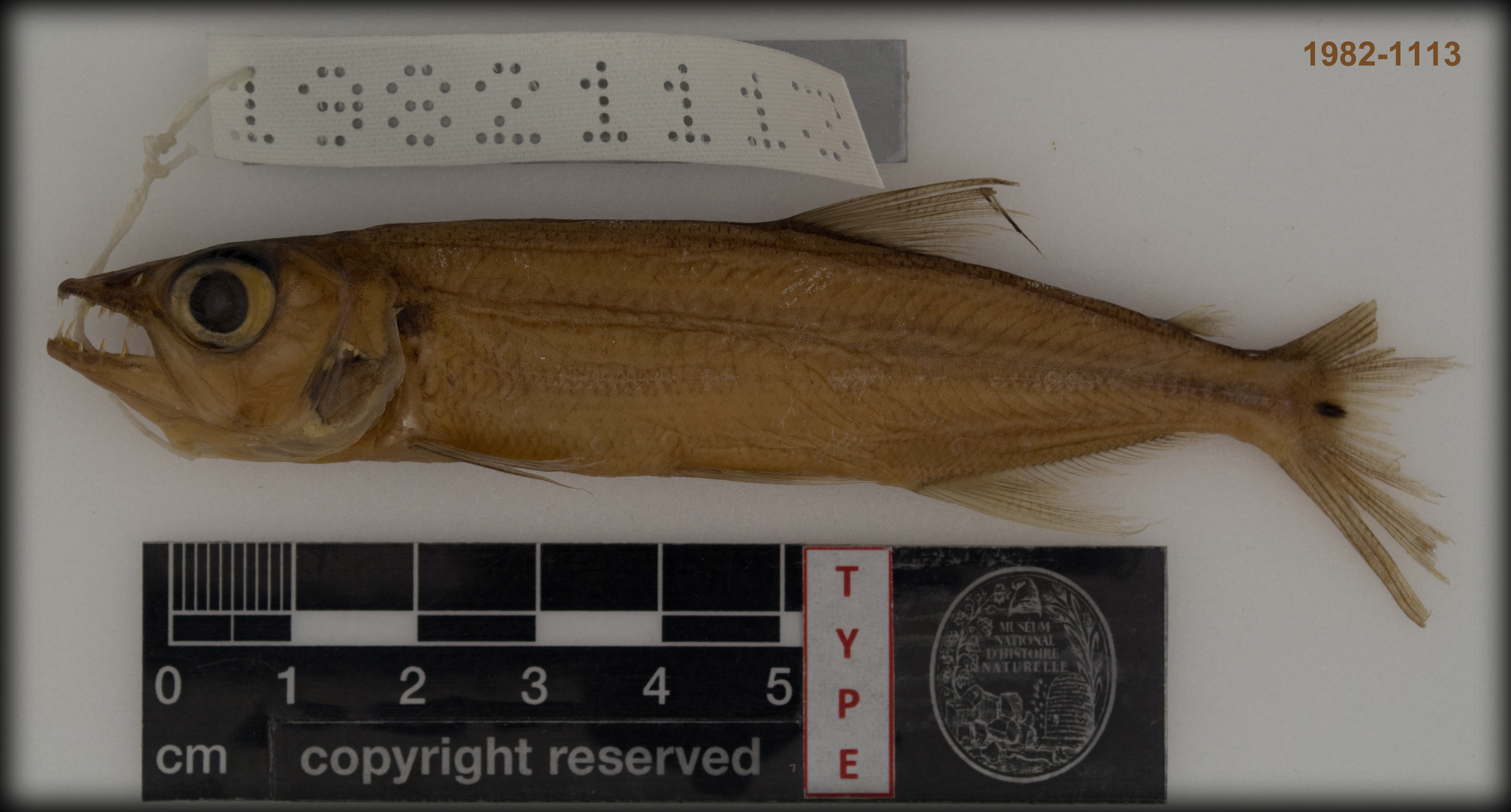
side

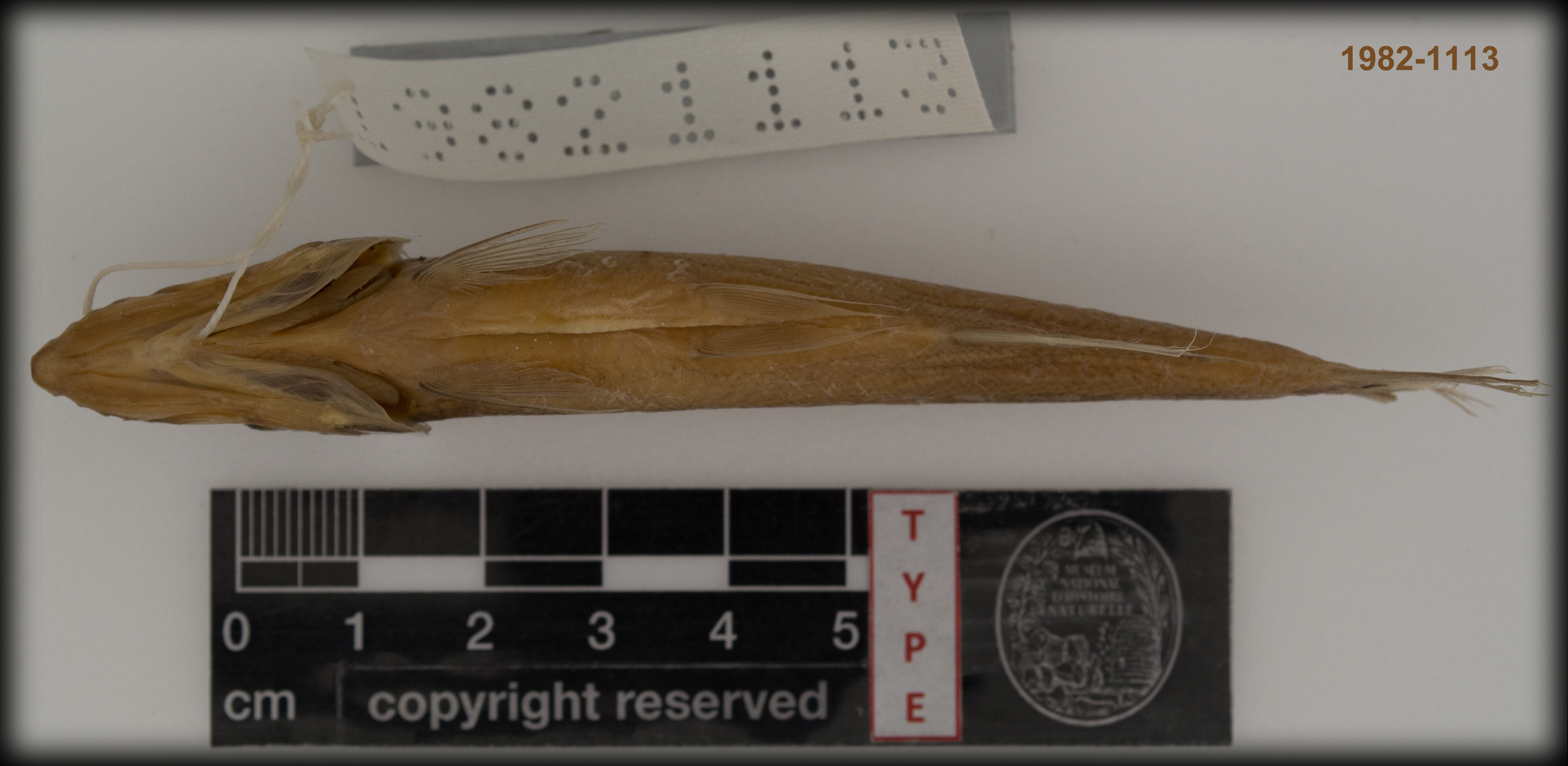
below

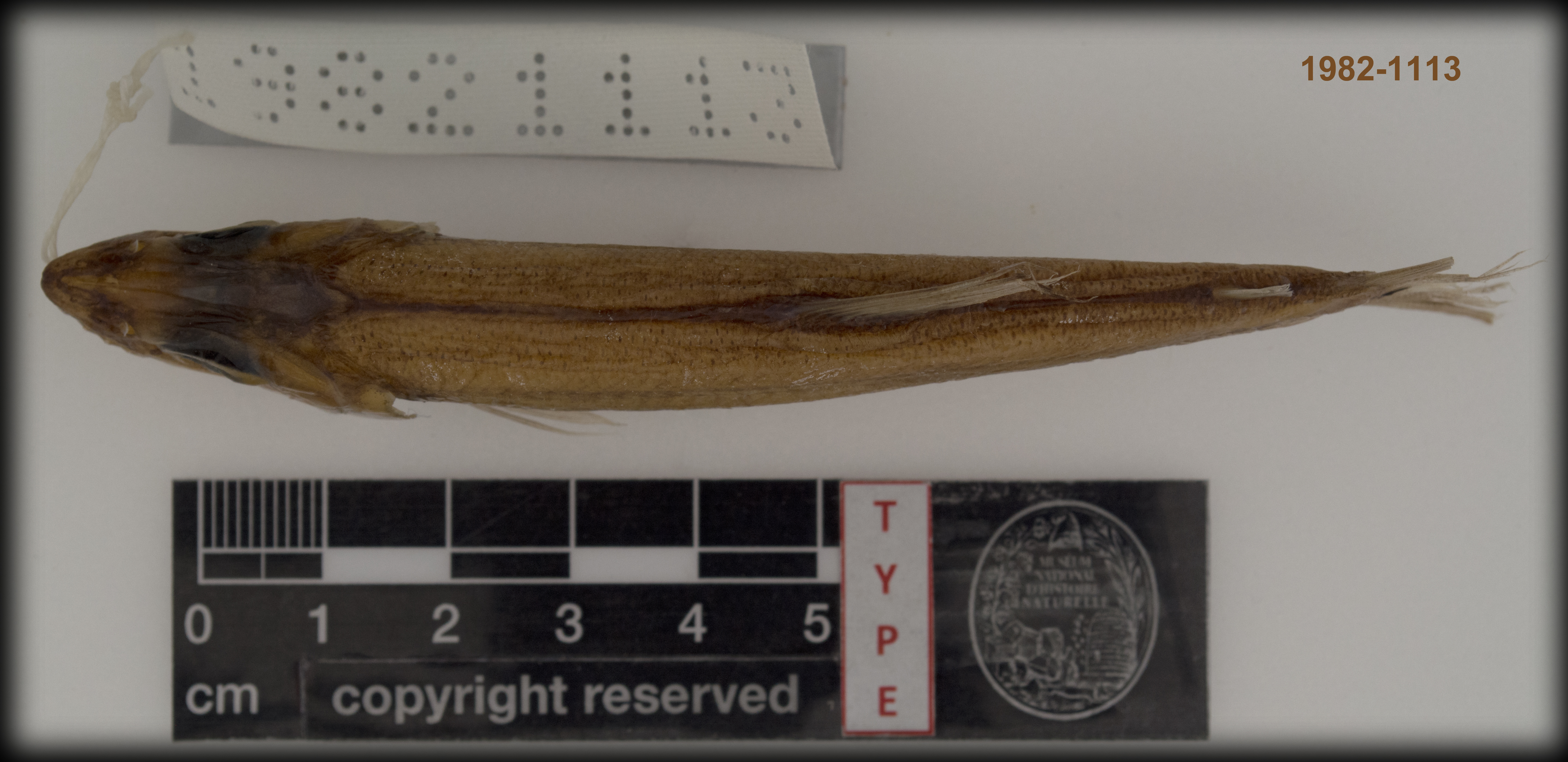
