= Bryconadenos =

Scientific classification
- Kingdom: Animalia
- Phylum: Chordata
- Class: Actinopterygii
- Order: Characiformes
- Family: Stevardiidae
- Subfamily: Diapominae
- Genus: Bryconadenos; Weitzman, Menezes, Evers & J. R. Burns, 2005

Genus of fishes

Bryconadenos is a genus of characins endemic to Brazil, with two currently recognized species:

- Bryconadenos tanaothoros S. H. Weitzman, Menezes, Evers & J. R. Burns, 2005
- Bryconadenos weitzmani Menezes, Netto Ferreira & K. M. Ferreira, 2009
