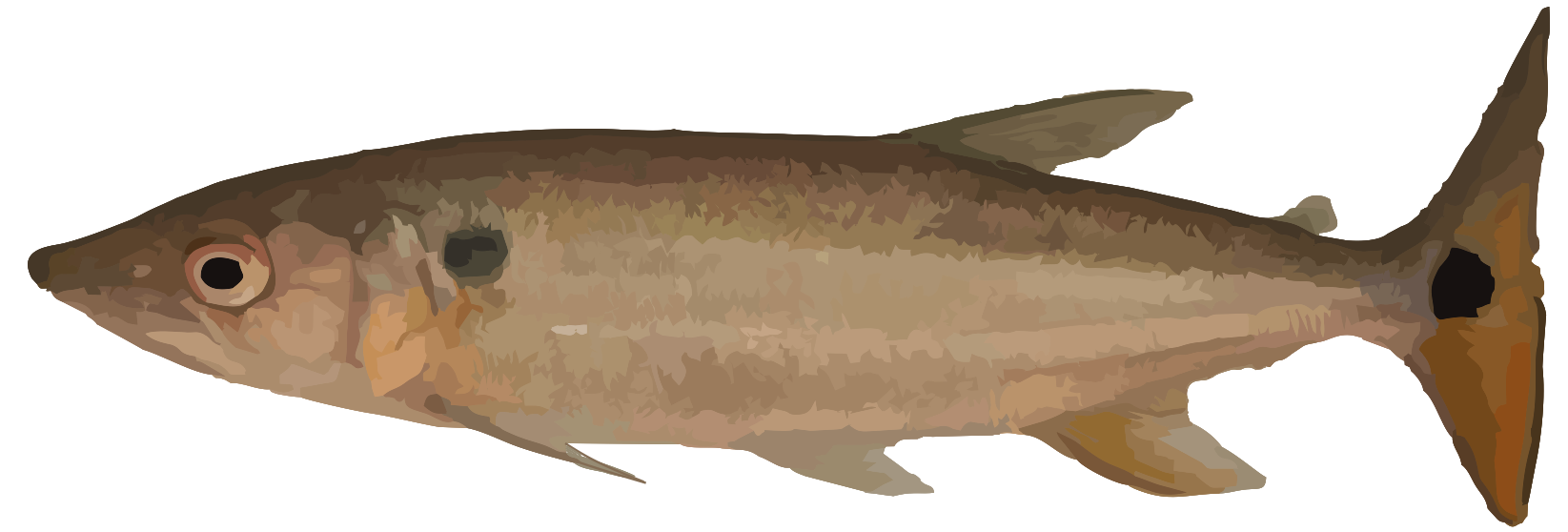
- Acestrorhynchus pantaneiro

Conservation status
- Least Concern (IUCN 3.1)

Scientific classification
- Kingdom: Animalia
- Phylum: Chordata
- Class: Actinopterygii
- Order: Characiformes
- Family: Acestrorhynchidae
- Genus: Acestrorhynchus
- Species: A. pantaneiro

Binomial name
- Acestrorhynchus pantaneiro Menezes, 1992

Synonyms
- Salmo denticulosus Larrañaga, 1923; Salmo vigintisexradiatus Larrañaga, 1923

= Acestrorhynchus pantaneiro =

Species of fish

Acestrorhynchus pantaneiro, known commonly as the pike characin, is a species of freshwater ray-finned fish belonging to the family Acestrorhynchidae, the freshwater barracudas. It was described by Naércio Aquino de Menezes in 1992. It inhabits the La Plata, Paraná, Paraguay, Uruguay, and Mamoré Rivers. It reaches a maximum total length of 35.2 cm (13.9 in), and a maximum weight of 396 g (14.0 oz).

A. pantaneiro feeds on bony fish. It is harvested by commercial fisheries.
