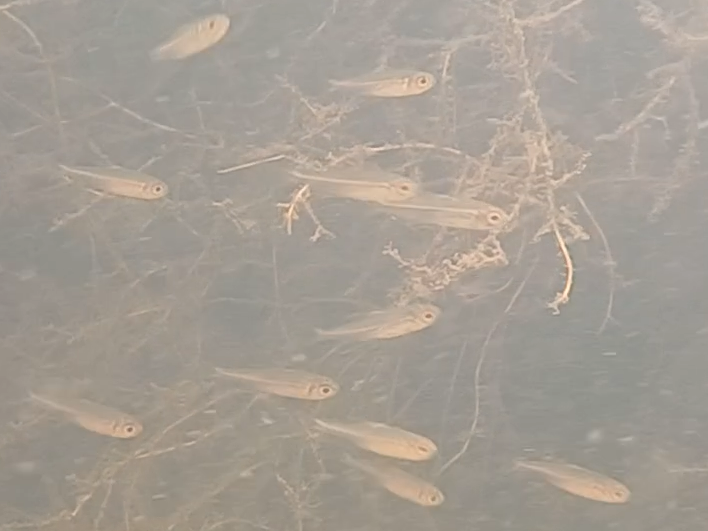

Conservation status
- Least Concern (IUCN 3.1)

Scientific classification
- Kingdom: Animalia
- Phylum: Chordata
- Class: Actinopterygii
- Order: Characiformes
- Family: Acestrorhynchidae
- Subfamily: Heterocharacinae
- Genus: Hoplocharax; Géry, 1966
- Species: H. goethei

Binomial name
- Hoplocharax goethei Géry, 1966

= Hoplocharax =

Species of fish

Hoplocharax is a monospecific genus of freshwater ray-finned fish belonging to the family Acestrorhynchidae, which includes the freshwater barracudas and the biting tetras. The only species in the genus is Hoplocharax goethei, which is found in South America.

== Taxonomy ==
Hoplocharax was first proposed as a genus in 1966 by the French ichthyologist Jacques Géry, when he described its only species, H. goethei. Géry gave the type locality of this species as the "Igarapé da Mae Joana", near Manaus on the lower Rio Negro in Brazil. This taxon is classified within the subfamily Heterocharacinae, the small biting tetras, of the family Acestrorhynchidae, within the suborder Characoidei of the order Characiformes.

== Etymology ==
Hoplocharax combines hoplon, meaning "shield" or "armour" in Greek, although in this case it is used to mean "armed" and to refer to the spine in the pectoral fin; with charax, meaning a "palisade". Charax is a reference to this fish's dense, sharp teeth, and is a common element in the scientific names of characins. The specific name honours Charles M. Goethe, the American eugenicist, entrepreneur, land developer, philanthropist, conservationist and founder of Sacramento State College, in recognition of his "support of scientists and students in the fields of biology, conservation, and education".

== Description ==
Hoplocharax has a maximum standard length of 3.0 cm (1.2 in).

== Distribution ==
Hoplocharax is found in South America, where it is found in the upper basins of the Amazon and Orinoco rivers in Brazil, Colombia and Venezuela.

== Notes ==
- Froese, Rainer; Pauly, Daniel (eds.). "Hoplocharax goethei". FishBase. October 2011 version.
