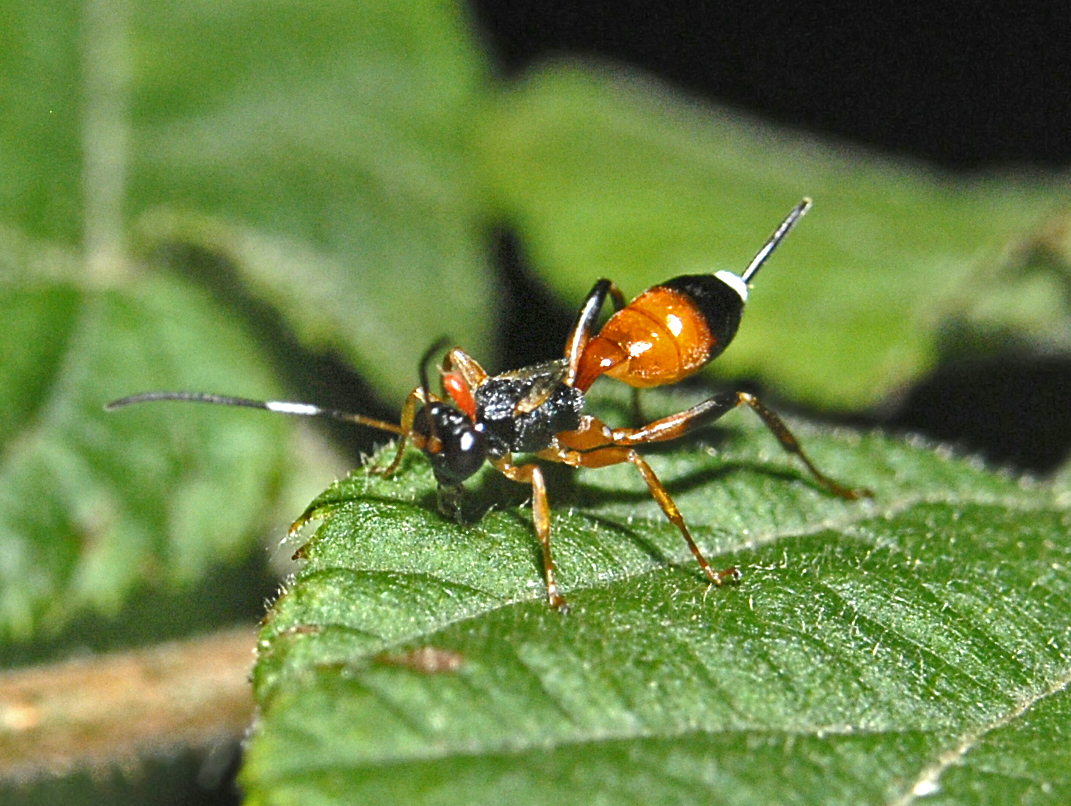
- Female of Agrothereutes abbreviatus

Scientific classification
- Kingdom: Animalia
- Phylum: Arthropoda
- Clade: Pancrustacea
- Class: Insecta
- Order: Hymenoptera
- Family: Ichneumonidae
- Subfamily: Cryptinae
- Tribe: Cryptini
- Subtribe: Agrothereutina
- Genus: Agrothereutes; Förster, 1850

= Agrothereutes =

Genus of wasps

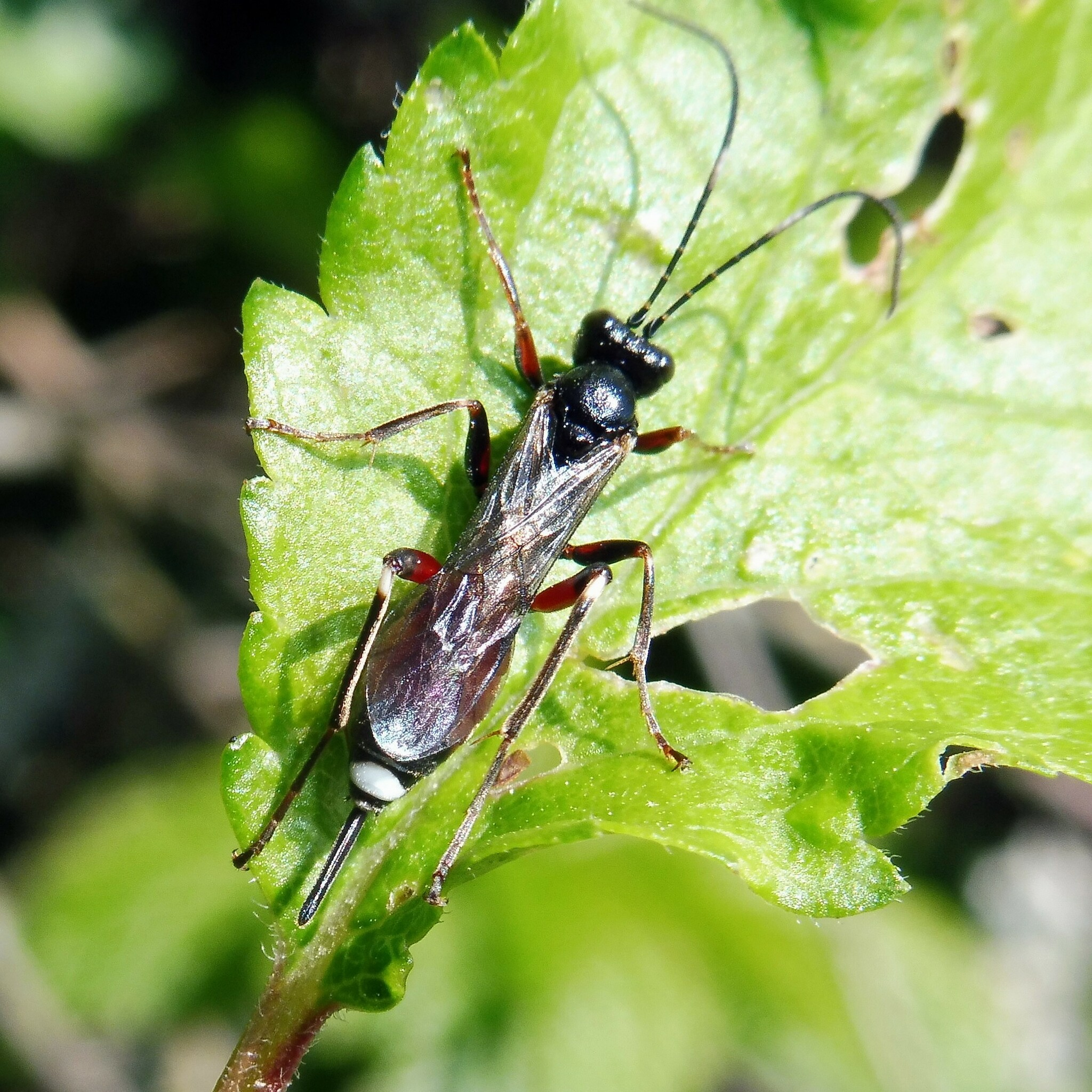
Agrothereutes leucorhaeus, UK

Agrothereutes is a genus of parasitoid wasps belonging to the family Ichneumonidae. There are more than 40 described species in Agrothereutes.

== Species ==
These 41 species belong to the genus Agrothereutes:

- Agrothereutes abbreviatus (Fabricius, 1794)
- Agrothereutes adustus (Gravenhorst, 1829)
- Agrothereutes albovinctus (Gravenhorst, 1829)
- Agrothereutes algericus (Habermehl, 1919)
- Agrothereutes alutarius Townes, 1962
- Agrothereutes aterrimus (Gravenhorst, 1829)
- Agrothereutes australis (Habermehl, 1926)
- Agrothereutes bicolor (de Stefani, 1884)
- Agrothereutes cimbcivorus (Cushman, 1924)
- Agrothereutes ferrieri (Faure, 1925)
- Agrothereutes fumipennis (Gravenhorst, 1829)
- Agrothereutes grandis Townes, 1962
- Agrothereutes grapholithae (Uchida, 1933)
- Agrothereutes hospes (Tschek, 1871)
- Agrothereutes lanceolatus
- Agrothereutes huebrichi Brethes, 1913
- Agrothereutes lanceolatus (Walker, 1874)
- Agrothereutes leucoproctus (Gravenhorst, 1829)
- Agrothereutes leucorhaeus (Donovan, 1810)
- Agrothereutes longicauda (Habermehl, 1935)
- Agrothereutes lophyri (Norton, 1869)
- Agrothereutes macroincubitor (Uchida, 1931)
- Agrothereutes mandator (Linnaeus, 1758)
- Agrothereutes mansuetor (Tschek, 1871)
- Agrothereutes minousubae Nakanishi, 1965
- Agrothereutes montanus Townes, 1962
- Agrothereutes monticola (Habermehl, 1935)
- Agrothereutes neodiprionis (Cushman, 1939)
- Agrothereutes pallipennis Townes, 1962
- Agrothereutes parvulus (Habermehl, 1926)
- Agrothereutes pilosus (Cameron, 1902)
- Agrothereutes pumilus (Kriechbaumer, 1899)
- Agrothereutes pygmaeus (Habermehl, 1919)
- Agrothereutes ramellaris (Uchida, 1930)
- Agrothereutes ramuli (Uchida, 1935)
- Agrothereutes rufofemoratus (Cameron, 1903)
- Agrothereutes saturniae (Boie, 1855)
- Agrothereutes subovalis (Pfankuch, 1914)
- Agrothereutes thoracicus (Szepligeti, 1916)
- Agrothereutes townesi Zhang, 1989
- Agrothereutes transsylvanicus (Kiss, 1926)
- Agrothereutes tunetanus (Habermehl, 1925)
