= Gilbertolus =

Scientific classification
- Kingdom: Animalia
- Phylum: Chordata
- Class: Actinopterygii
- Order: Characiformes
- Family: Acestrorhynchidae
- Subfamily: Roestinae
- Genus: Gilbertolus; C. H. Eigenmann, 1907

Type species
- Anacyrtus (Raestes) alatus Steindachner, 1878

Genus of fishes

Gilbertolus is a genus of freshwater ray-finned fishes belonging to the family Acestrorhynchidae, which includes the biting tetras and freshwater barracudas. The fishes in this genus are from northwestern South America, restricted to the Atrato, Magdalena and Maracaibo basins.

== Species ==
Gilbertolus contains the following valid species:

- Gilbertolus alatus (Steindachner, 1878)
- Gilbertolus atratoensis L. P. Schultz, 1943
- Gilbertolus maracaiboensis L. P. Schultz, 1943
