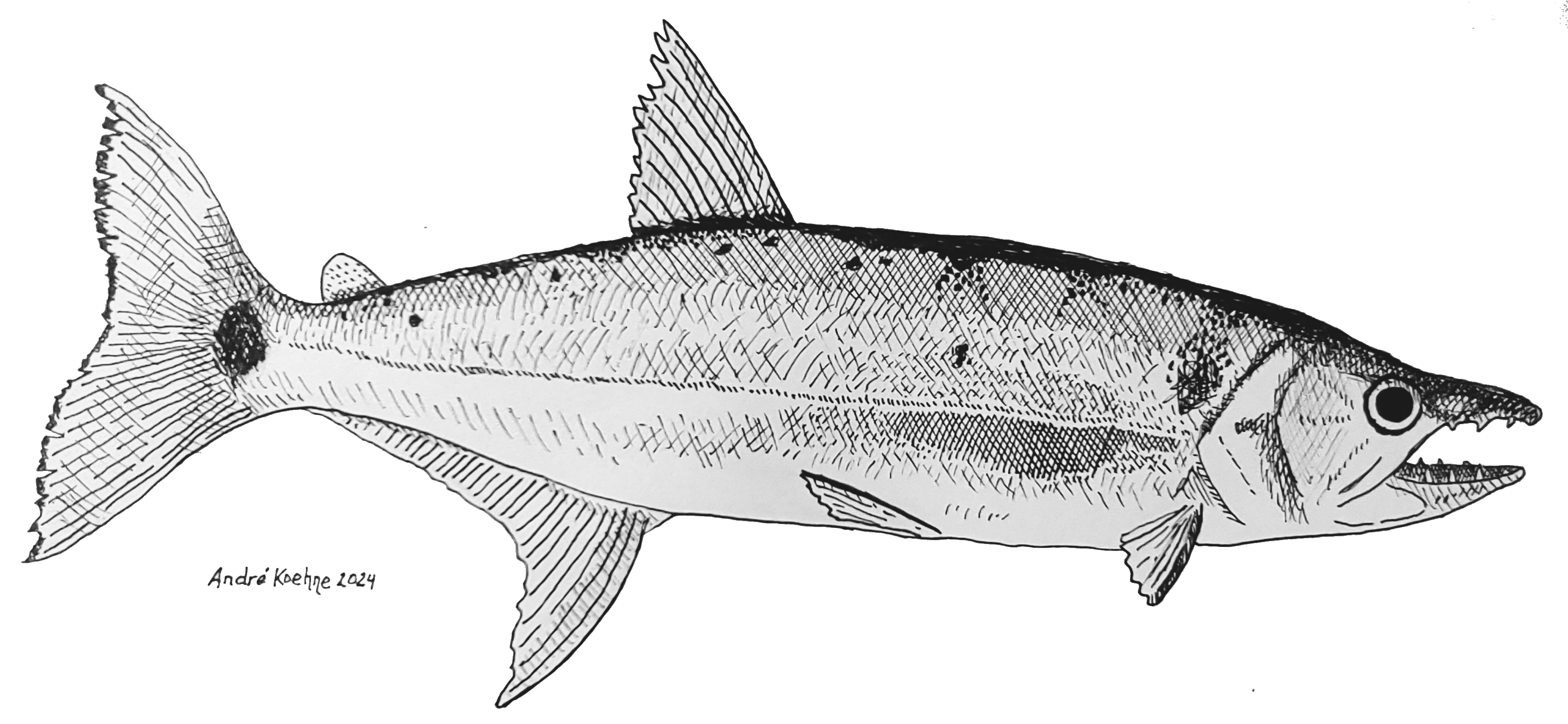

Conservation status
- Least Concern (IUCN 3.1)

Scientific classification
- Kingdom: Animalia
- Phylum: Chordata
- Class: Actinopterygii
- Order: Characiformes
- Family: Acestrorhynchidae
- Genus: Acestrorhynchus
- Species: A. lacustris

Binomial name
- Acestrorhynchus lacustris (Lütken, 1875)

Synonyms
- Xiphorhamphus lacustris Lütken, 1875

= Acestrorhynchus lacustris =

Species of fish

Acestrorhynchus lacustris is a species of freshwater ray-finned fish belonging to the family Acestrorhynchidae, the freshwater barracudas. It was described by Christian Frederik Lütken in 1875, originally under the genus Xiphorhamphus. It inhabits the São Francisco and Paraná River. It reaches a maximum standard length of 27 cm (11 in).

A. lacustris spawns between July–March.
