= Lonchogenys =

Conservation status
- Least Concern (IUCN 3.1)

Scientific classification
- Kingdom: Animalia
- Phylum: Chordata
- Class: Actinopterygii
- Order: Characiformes
- Family: Acestrorhynchidae
- Subfamily: Heterocharacinae
- Genus: Lonchogenys; G. S. Myers, 1927
- Species: L. ilisha

Binomial name
- Lonchogenys ilisha G. S. Myers, 1927

Monotypic genus of fish

Lonchogenys, is a monospecific genus of freshwater ray-finned fish belonging to the family Acestrorhynchidae, which includes the freshwater barracudas and the biting tetras. The only species in the genus is Lonchogenys ilisha. This fish is found in tropical freshwater habitats in the Orinoco and Amazon basins in Brazil, Colombia and Venezuela.
