= Acestrorhynchus abbreviatus =

Conservation status
- Least Concern (IUCN 3.1)

Scientific classification
- Kingdom: Animalia
- Phylum: Chordata
- Class: Actinopterygii
- Order: Characiformes
- Family: Acestrorhynchidae
- Genus: Acestrorhynchus
- Species: A. abbreviatus

Binomial name
- Acestrorhynchus abbreviatus (Cope, 1878)

Synonyms
- Xiphorhamphus abbreviatus Cope, 1878

Species of fish

Acestrorhynchus abbreviatus is a species of freshwater ray-finned fish belonging to the family Acestrorhynchidae, the freshwater barracudas. It was described by Edward Drinker Cope in 1878, originally under the genus Xiphorhamphus. It inhabits the Amazon and Madeira Rivers in Bolivia. Brazil, Colombia, Ecuador and Peru. It reaches a maximum standard length of 22 cm (8.7 in).
