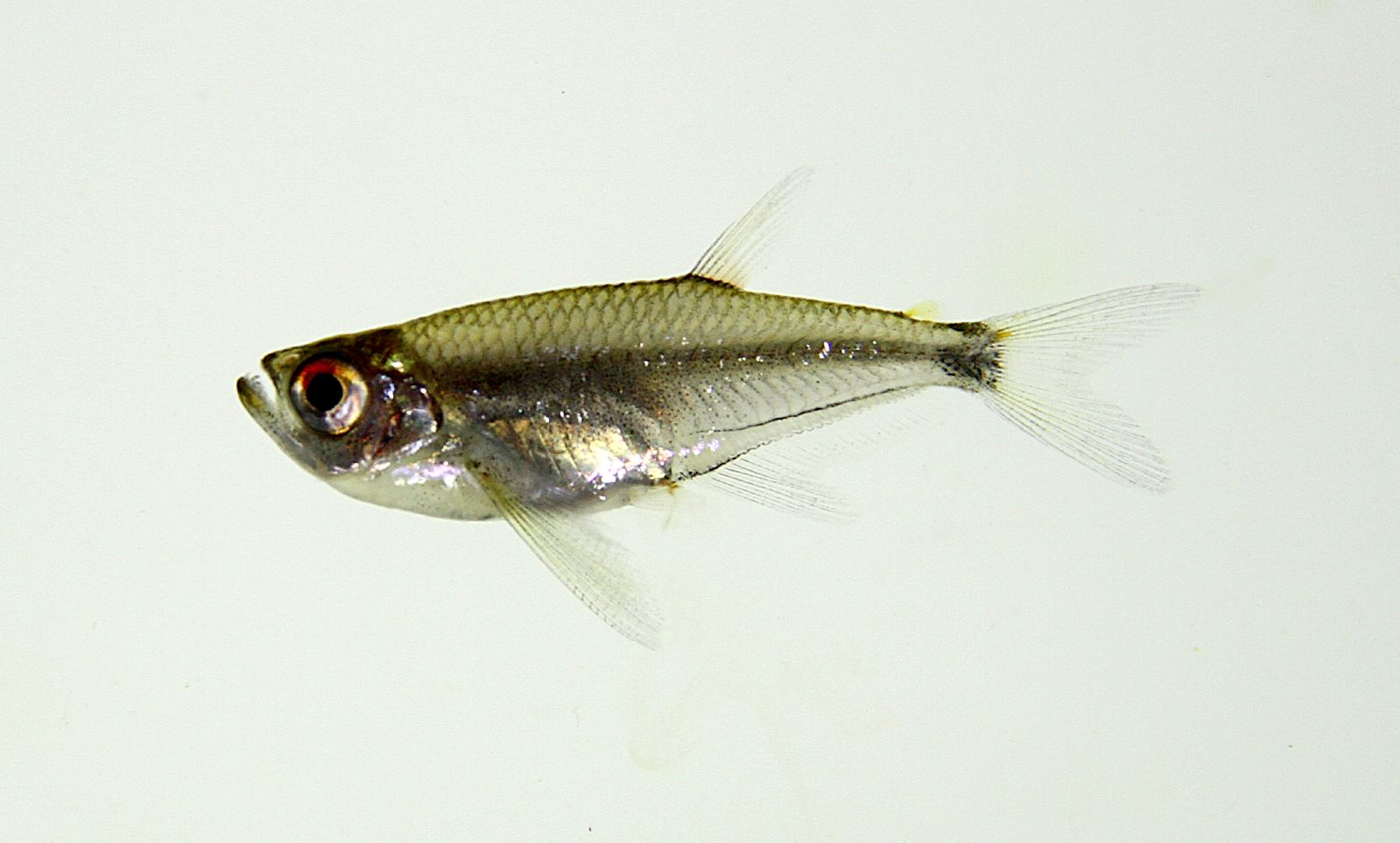

Conservation status
- Least Concern (IUCN 3.1)

Scientific classification
- Kingdom: Animalia
- Phylum: Chordata
- Class: Actinopterygii
- Order: Characiformes
- Family: Acestrorhynchidae
- Subfamily: Heterocharacinae
- Genus: Gnathocharax; Fowler, 1913
- Species: G. steindachneri

Binomial name
- Gnathocharax steindachneri Fowler, 1913

= Gnathocharax =

Genus of fishes

Gnathocharax, is a monospecific genus of freshwater ray-finned fish belonging to the family Acestrorhynchidae, which includes the freshwater barracudas and the biting tetras. The only species in the genus is Gnathocharax steindachneri, also known as the arowana tetra. This fish is found in tropical freshwater habitats in the Orinoco and Amazon basins of South America.

== Taxonomy ==
Ganthocharax was first proposed as a genus in 1913 by the American zoologist Henry Weed Fowler when he described its only species, G. steindachneri. Fowler gave the type locality of this species as the Igarapé de Candelaria, a tributary of the Rio Madeira and about 2 miles (3.2 km) distant, at 8°45'S, 63°54'W, in Brazil. This taxon was formerly classified in the family Characidae, but is now classified within the subfamily Heterocharacinae, the small biting tetras, of the family Acestrorhynchidae, within the suborder Characoidei of the order Characiformes.

== Etymology ==
Ganthocharax combines gnáthos, meaning "jaw" in Greek, an allusion to the angled elongated maxilla, with charax, meaning a "palisade". Charax is a reference to this fish's dense, sharp teeth, and is a common element in the scientific names of characins. The specific name honours Franz Steindachner, the Austrian ichthyologist.

== Description ==
Gnathocharax has a maximum standard length of 5 cm (2.0 in). This taxon has a thin, laterally compressed body. Both jaws have prominent, protruding teeth, and the mouth points upwards. The background colour is silvery with a greenish iridescence, with a black blotch with red spots on its anterior and posterior margins on the caudal peduncle. There is a red crescent around the eyes, and a scattering of small black spots on the otherwise transparent fins.

== Distribution ==
Gnathocharax is found in the drainages of the Amazon and Orinoco rivers, and has been recorded from Bolivia, Brazil, Colombia, Ecuador, Guyana, Peru and Venezuela.
