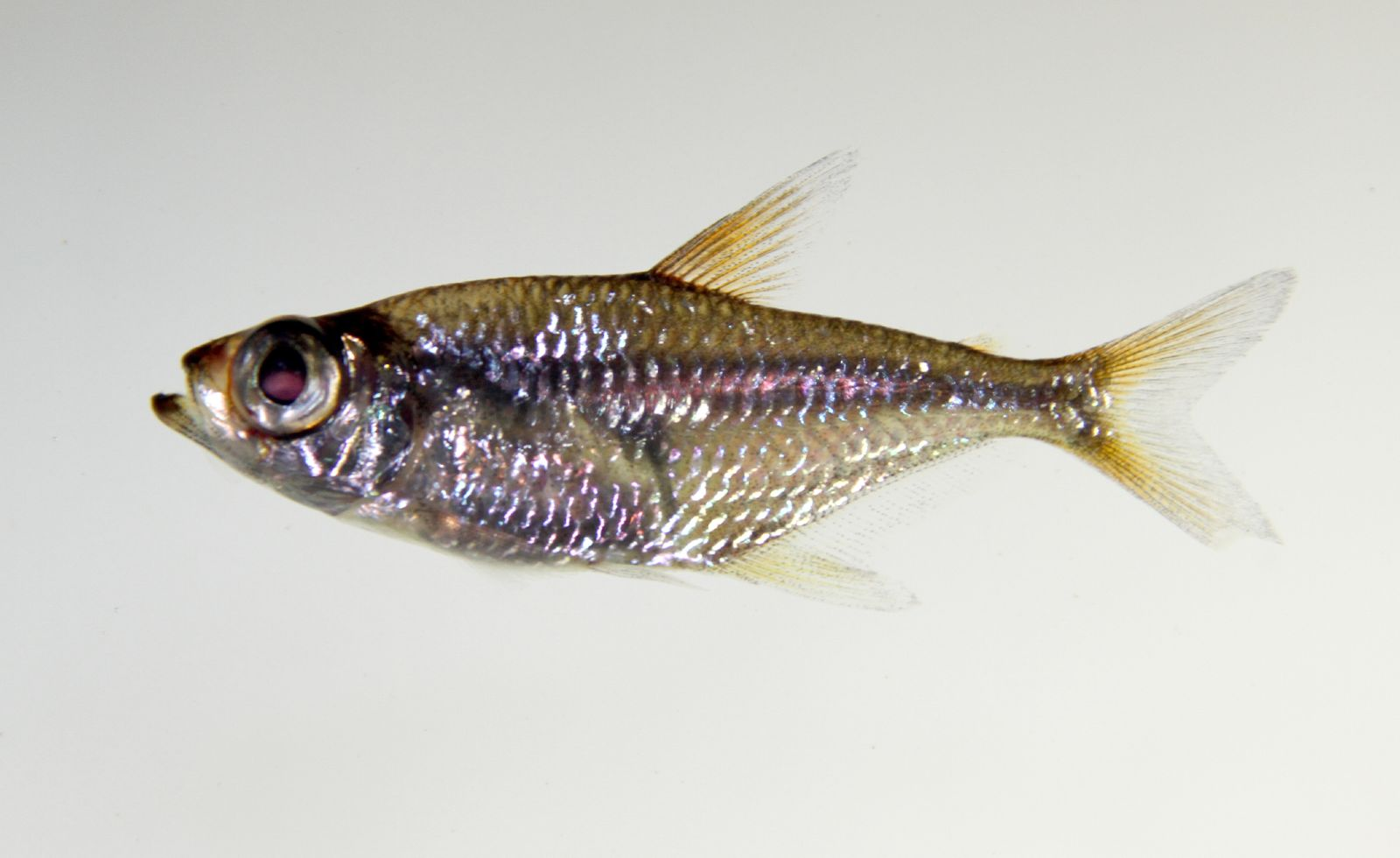

Scientific classification
- Kingdom: Animalia
- Phylum: Chordata
- Class: Actinopterygii
- Order: Characiformes
- Family: Acestrorhynchidae
- Subfamily: Heterocharacinae
- Genus: Heterocharax; C. H. Eigenmann, 1912

Type species
- Heterocharax macrolepis C. H. Eigenmann, 1912

= Heterocharax =

Genus of fishes

Heterocharax is a genus of freshwater ray-finned fishes belonging to the family Acestrorhynchidae, the biting tetras and freshwater barracudas. The species in this genus are found in South America.

== Species ==
Heterocharax contains the following species:

- Heterocharax leptogrammus Toledo-Piza, 2000
- Heterocharax macrolepis C. H. Eigenmann, 1912
- Heterocharax virgulatus Toledo-Piza, 2000
