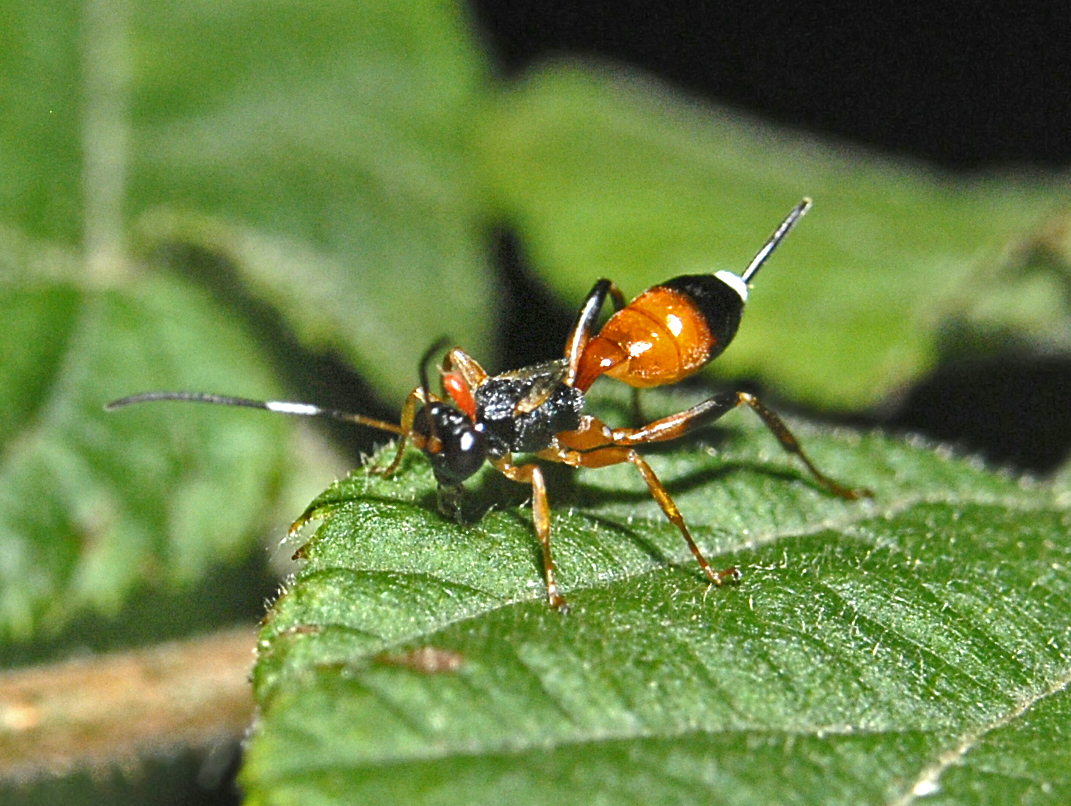
- Female of Agrothereutes abbreviatus

Scientific classification
- Kingdom: Animalia
- Phylum: Arthropoda
- Clade: Pancrustacea
- Class: Insecta
- Order: Hymenoptera
- Family: Ichneumonidae
- Tribe: Cryptini
- Subtribe: Agrothereutina
- Genus: Agrothereutes
- Species: A. abbreviatus

Binomial name
- Agrothereutes abbreviatus (Fabricius, 1794)

Synonyms
- See list

= Agrothereutes abbreviatus =

Species of wasp

Agrothereutes abbreviatus is a species of parasitic wasp belonging to the family Ichneumonidae.

== Description ==
Agrothereutes abbreviatus has black head and thorax, while the abdomen shows black and reddish bands, with a white area on the tip and a white basal zone on the hind tibia. In the females wings are very reduced (brachyptery), reaching only the hind margin of postscutellum or the first abdominal tergite. These wasps usually move nimbly on the ground and beneath the fallen leaves looking for their hosts. Adults occurs from May to June.

== Distribution ==
This species is present in most of European countries, in the Near East, in the Nearctic realm, and in the Oriental realm.

== Taxonomy ==
=== Subspecies ===
Sources:

- Agrothereutes abbreviatus abbreviatus (Fabricius, 1798)
- Agrothereutes abbreviatus alsaticus (Seyrig, 1927)
- Agrothereutes abbreviatus iridescens (Cresson, 1864)
- Agrothereutes abbreviatus rufopectus Cushman, 1927

=== Synonyms ===
- Agrothereutes alpius Heinrich, 1951
- Agrothereutes tricolor (Uchida, 1931)
- Agrothereutes alpinus (Habermehl, 1925)
- Agrothereutes cingulatus (Kiss, 1924)
- Agrothereutes variegatus (Kiss, 1924)
- Agrothereutes tricolor (Rudow, 1917)
- Agrothereutes atratus (Rudow, 1917)
- Agrothereutes spectabilis (Rudow, 1917)
- Agrothereutes livonensis (Rudow, 1917)
- Agrothereutes spectabilis (Rudow, 1914)
- Agrothereutes brevipennis (Kriechbaumer, 1893)
- Agrothereutes tricolor (Rudow, 1886)
- Agrothereutes spectabilis (Rudow, 1886)
- Agrothereutes destitutus Vollenhoven, 1879
- Agrothereutes dispar (Thomson, 1873)
- Agrothereutes batavus Vollenhoven, 1873
- Agrothereutes brevipennis (Marshall, 1867)
- Agrothereutes leucomerus (Ratzeburg, 1852)
- Agrothereutes evanescens (Ratzeburg, 1852)
- Agrothereutes ocellator (Zetterstedt, 1838)
- Agrothereutes incubitor (Gravenhorst, 1829)
- Agrothereutes tibiator (Gravenhorst, 1829)
- Agrothereutes marginellus (Gravenhorst, 1829)
- Agrothereutes hopei (Gravenhorst, 1829)
- Agrothereutes pygoleucus (Gravenhorst, 1829)
- Agrothereutes breviator (Thunberg, 1822)
- Agrothereutes abbreviator (Fabricius, 1798)
