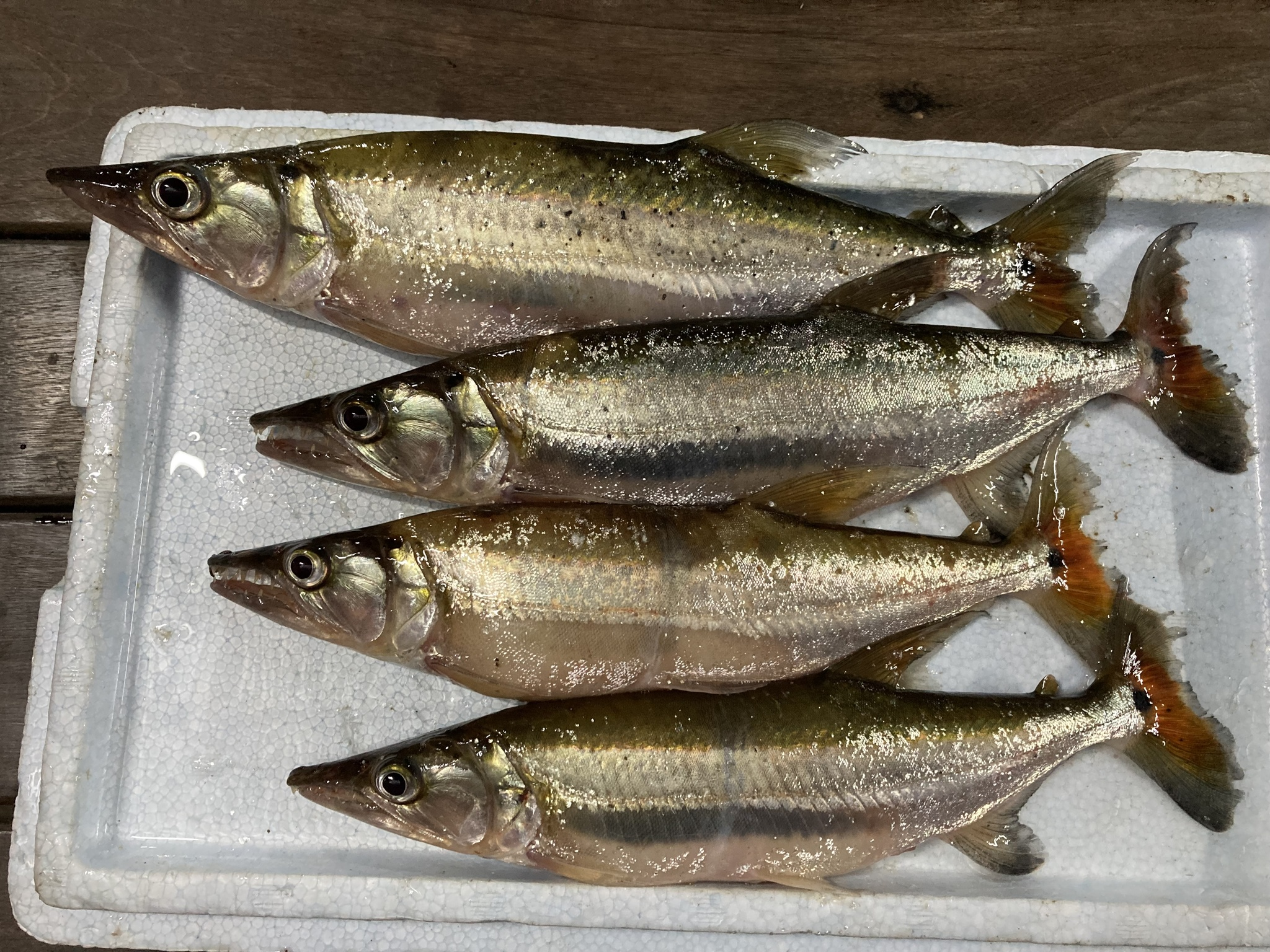
- Acestrorhynchus heterolepis

Scientific classification
- Kingdom: Animalia
- Phylum: Chordata
- Class: Actinopterygii
- Order: Characiformes
- Family: Acestrorhynchidae
- Subfamily: Acestrorhynchinae; C. H. Eigenmann, 1912
- Genus: Acestrorhynchus; C. H. Eigenmann & C. H. Kennedy, 1903

Type species
- Salmo falcatus Bloch, 1794

Species
- See text

Synonyms
- Xiphorhynchus Agassiz, 1829; Xiphorhamphus Müller & Troschel, 1844; Sphyraenocharax Fowler, 1907

= Acestrorhynchus =

Genus of fishes

Acestrorhynchus ("needle jaw" ) is a genus of freshwater ray-finned fishes belonging to the family Acestrorhynchidae. The fishes in this genus are found South America. It is the sole genus in the subfamily Acestrorhynchinae. Their greatest diversity is in the Orinoco and Amazon basins.

These fish have elongated pike-like bodies and large conical teeth, adapted for predation on other types of fish. They are sometimes referred to as freshwater barracudas in the aquarium trade, although the name is used of other characins as well. They range from 35 to 400 mm (1.5 in to 1 ft 3.5 in) in length.

Until recently, they were considered the only genus in the family Acestrorhynchidae, but phylogenetic studies have recovered several smaller characins previously placed elsewhere in the family (known as "biting tetras") as closely related to them.

Common names are cachorinho, cachorro, mopiye, payala, pejezorro, pez cachorro, pez zorro, pike characin, moinge, halatawéi, halataway, dagu fisi, ueua, wayabra, zadoe, freshwater barracuda, saicanga, branca, cajaba, cachorra magra, cadelinha and dentudo.

== Species ==
There are currently 14 valid species:

- Acestrorhynchus abbreviatus (Cope, 1878)
- Acestrorhynchus altus Menezes, 1969
- Acestrorhynchus britskii Menezes, 1969
- Acestrorhynchus falcatus (Bloch, 1794) (freshwater barracuda, spotted cachorro)
- Acestrorhynchus falcirostris (G. Cuvier, 1819) (slender freshwater barracuda, big-eyed cachorro)
- Acestrorhynchus grandoculis Menezes & Géry, 1983
- Acestrorhynchus heterolepis (Cope, 1878)
- Acestrorhynchus isalineae Menezes & Géry, 1983
- Acestrorhynchus lacustris (Lütken, 1875)
- Acestrorhynchus maculipinna Menezes & Géry, 1983
- Acestrorhynchus microlepis (Jardine, 1841) (pike characin)
- Acestrorhynchus minimus Menezes, 1969
- Acestrorhynchus nasutus C. H. Eigenmann, 1912
- Acestrorhynchus pantaneiro Menezes, 1992
