= Naércio Aquino de Menezes =

Brazilian ichthyologist and professor

- Born: 1937 (age 88–89)
- Education: BSc in Natural History (1962); PhD in Biology (1968)
- Alma mater: University of São Paulo; Harvard University
- Known for: Systematics and biogeography of Neotropical and marine fishes
- Scientific career
- Fields: Ichthyology, Zoology
- Institutions: University of São Paulo
- Author abbrev. (zoology): Menezes

Naércio Aquino de Menezes (born 1937) is a Brazilian ichthyologist and university professor.

== Career ==
Naércio Aquino de Menezes graduated in 1962 with a degree in Natural History from the University of São Paulo (USP) and earned his doctorate in Biology in 1968 at Harvard University.

He is a full professor in the Department of Zoology at the Institute of Biosciences of the University of São Paulo and serves as a senior researcher and lecturer at the same university, also teaching at the Museum of Zoology (Ichthyology Laboratory) of the University of São Paulo.

Menezes is a specialist in zoology, focusing on systematics, biogeography, and evolution of fishes, particularly the marine fish species of the Brazilian coast and Neotropical freshwater fishes.

He is a member of the Brazilian Society of Ichthyology.

Together with his colleague Mário César Cardoso de Pinna, he described the new species Pristigaster whiteheadi.

== Described taxa (selection) ==
- Acestrorhynchus grandoculis
- Acestrorhynchus isalineae
- Amphiarius
- Carlarius
- Chrysobrycon
- Knodus nuptialis
- Mimagoniates rheocharis
- Mimagoniates sylvicola
- Mugil margaritae
- Oligosarcus varii
- Pristigaster whiteheadi

== Selected publications ==
- Menezes, N. A. & Weitzman, S. H. (1990): "Two new species of Mimagoniates (Teleostei: Characidae: Glandulocaudinae), their phylogeny and biogeography and a key to the glandulocaudin fishes of Brazil and Paraguay". Proceedings of the Biological Society of Washington 103(2): 380–426.
- Menezes, N. A. & Weitzman, S. H. (2009): "Systematics of the Neotropical fish subfamily Glandulocaudinae (Teleostei: Characiformes: Characidae)". Neotropical Ichthyology 7 (3): 295–370. (Abstract).
- Arcila, D., Vari, R. P. & Menezes, N. A. (2014): "Revision of the Neotropical Genus Acrobrycon (Ostariophysi: Characiformes: Characidae) with Description of Two New Species". Copeia 2013 (4) [2014]: 604–611.
- Loeb, M. V. & Menezes, N. A. (2015): "Taxonomic status of Engraulis nattereri Steindachner, 1880 (Osteichthyes: Clupeiformes: Engraulidae)". Zootaxa 3941 (2): 299–300.
- Menezes, N. A., Nirchio, M., De Oliveira, C. & Siccharamirez, R. (2015): "Taxonomic review of the species of Mugil (Teleostei: Perciformes: Mugilidae) from the Atlantic South Caribbean and South America, with integration of morphological, cytogenetic and molecular data". Zootaxa 3918 (1): 1–38. doi:10.11646/zootaxa.3918.1.1
- Menezes, N. A., Zanata, A. M. & Camelier, P. (2015): "Nematocharax costai Bragança, Barbosa & Mattos a junior synonym of Nematocharax venustus Weitzman, Menezes & Britski (Teleostei: Characiformes: Characidae)". Zootaxa 3920 (3): 453–462.
- Ribeiro, A. C. & Menezes, N. A. (2015): "Phylogenetic relationships of the species and biogeography of the characid genus Oligosarcus Günther, 1864 (Ostariophysi, Characiformes, Characidae)". Zootaxa 3949 (1): 41–81.
- Menezes, N. A. & Ribeiro, A. C. (2015): "A new species of the lowland Oligosarcus Günther species group (Teleostei: Ostariophysi: Characidae)". Neotropical Ichthyology 13 (3): 541–546.
- Ferreira, K. M., de Faria, E., Ribeiro, A. C., Santana, J. C. O., Quagio-Grassioto, I. & Menezes, N. A. (2018): "Gephyrocharax machadoi, a new species of Stevardiinae (Characiformes: Characidae) from the Rio Paraguai basin, central Brazil". Zootaxa 4415 (1): 161–172.
- Menezes, N. A. & Marinho, M. M. F. (2019): "A new species of Knodus Eigenmann (Characiformes: Characidae: Stevardiinae) with comments on nuptial tubercles and gill gland in characiform fishes". PLoS ONE 14 (7): e0217915.

== Author abbreviation ==
The abbreviation Menezes is used to indicate Naércio Aquino de Menezes as the authority for species descriptions and taxonomy in zoology.
