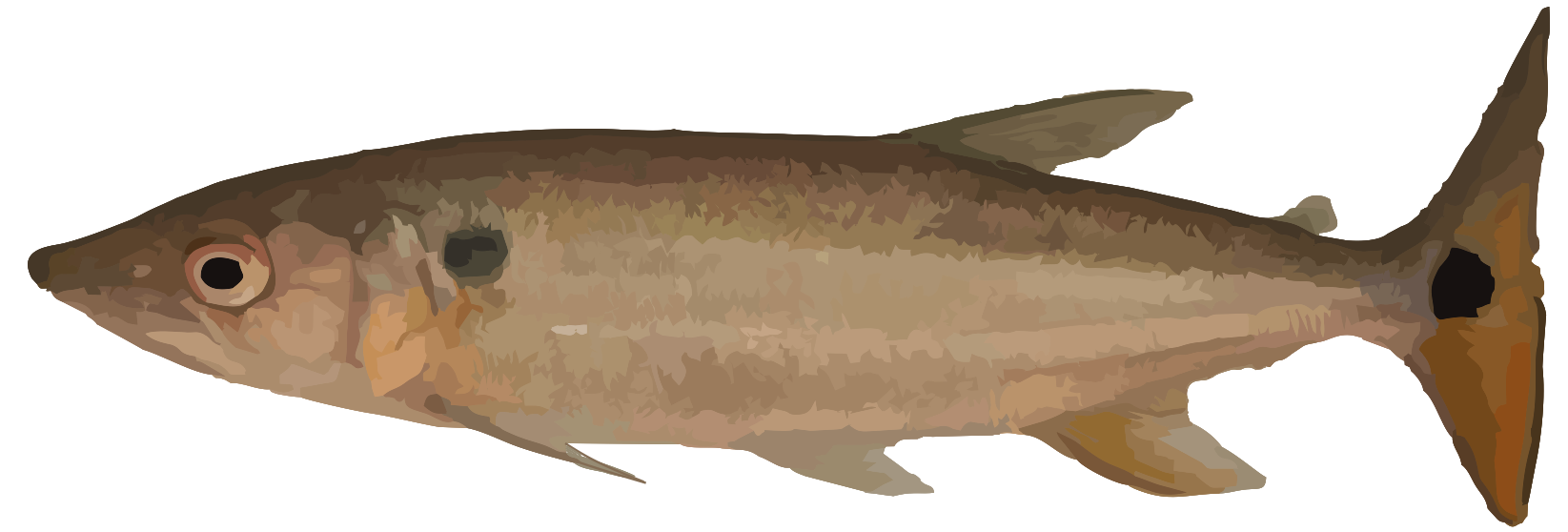
- Acestrorhynchus pantaneiro

Scientific classification
- Kingdom: Animalia
- Phylum: Chordata
- Class: Actinopterygii
- Order: Characiformes
- Suborder: Characoidei
- Family: Acestrorhynchidae; C. H. Eigenmann, 1912

Type genus
- Acestrorhynchus C. H. Eigenmann & C. H. Kennedy, 1903

Subfamilies
- see text

= Acestrorhynchidae =

Family of fish

Acestrorhynchidae is a family of freshwater fish in the order Characiformes, found in South America. Members of this family are known as freshwater barracudas (not to be confused with the unrelated true barracudas of the Sphyraenidae) and biting tetras.

Until recently, this family contained only the genus Acestrorhynchus. However, taxonomic studies have found that the subfamilies Heterocharacinae (originally placed in the closely related Characidae) and Roestinae (originally placed in the more distantly related Cynodontidae) are actually more closely related to Acestrorhynchus, and now they are also placed in this family.

The family is classified as follows:

- Family Acestrorhynchidae
  - Subfamily Acestrorhynchinae C. H. Eigenmann, 1912 (freshwater barracudas)
    - Genus Acestrorhynchus C. H. Eigenmann & C. H. Kennedy, 1903
  - Subfamily Roestinae Lucena & Menezes, 1998 (biting tetras)
    - Genus Gilbertolus C. H. Eigenmann, 1907
    - Genus Roestes Günther, 1864
  - Subfamily Heterocharacinae Géry, 1966 (small biting tetras)
    - Genus Gnathocharax Fowler, 1913
    - Genus Heterocharax C. H. Eigenmann, 1912
    - Genus Hoplocharax Géry, 1966
    - Genus Lonchogenys Myers, 1927
