= C. flavescens =

C. flavescens may refer to:

- Callista flavescens, a tropical orchid
- Caloplaca flavescens, a crustose lichen
- Calytrix flavescens, a shrub endemic to Australia
- Camponotus flavescens, a carpenter ant
- Canna flavescens, a garden plant
- Catocala flavescens, an Indian moth
- Celeus flavescens, a South American woodpecker
- Cephalostachyum flavescens, an Asian bamboo
- Ceratostylis flavescens, a flowering plant
- Chaetobranchus flavescens, a South American fish
- Chamaesciadium flavescens, a flowering plant
- Charaphloeus flavescens, a lined flat bark beetle
- Chemnitzia flavescens, a sea snail
- Chionochloa flavescens, a tussock grass
- Chira flavescens, a jumping spider
- Clathrus flavescens, a saprobic stinkhorn
- Cleistanthus flavescens, a near threatened plant
- Cnidocampa flavescens, an Asian moth
- Cnodalia flavescens, an orb-weaver spider
- Coccophagus flavescens, a chalcid wasp
- Conioscinella flavescens, a grass fly
- Conus flavescens, a sea snail
- Cormocephalus flavescens, a large centipede
- Corymbia flavescens, a dicotyledon plant
- Corynebacterium flavescens, a rod-shaped bacterium
- Coryphopterus flavescens, a goby native to the eastern Atlantic Ocean
- Creagrutus flavescens, a South American characin
- Cresponea flavescens, a lichenized fungus
- Crocidura flavescens, a white-toothed shrew
- Cryptococcus flavescens, a dimorphic fungus
- Cyperus flavescens, a papyrus sedge
- Cypripedium flavescens, a lady's slipper orchid
- Cyrtopodium flavescens, a flowering plant
