= Tetramicra =

Tetramicra may refer to:

- Tetramicra (plant), a genus of flowering plants in the family Orchidaceae
- Tetramicra (microsporidian), a fungus genus in the division Microsporidia
