= × Cyrtellia =

Scientific classification
- Kingdom: Plantae
- Clade: Tracheophytes
- Clade: Angiosperms
- Clade: Monocots
- Order: Asparagales
- Family: Orchidaceae
- Subfamily: Epidendroideae
- Tribe: Cymbidieae
- Genus: × Cyrtellia hort.

Genus of orchids

× Cyrtellia, abbreviated in trade journals Cyrtl, is an intergeneric hybrid between the orchid genera Ansellia and Cyrtopodium (Aslla x Cyrt).
