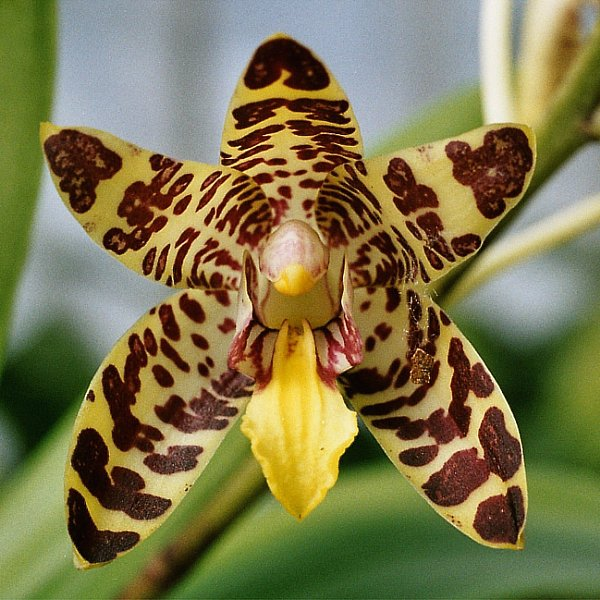

Conservation status
- Vulnerable (IUCN 3.1)
- CITES Appendix II

Scientific classification
- Kingdom: Plantae
- Clade: Tracheophytes
- Clade: Angiosperms
- Clade: Monocots
- Order: Asparagales
- Family: Orchidaceae
- Subfamily: Epidendroideae
- Tribe: Cymbidieae
- Subtribe: Eulophiinae
- Genus: Ansellia; Lindl.
- Species: A. africana

Binomial name
- Ansellia africana Lindl.

Subspecies
- Ansellia africana subsp. africana (Tropical and South Africa); Ansellia africana subsp. australis (Angola)

= Ansellia =

Genus of orchids

Ansellia is considered a monotypic genus of orchid, with only one species, Ansellia africana, commonly known as African ansellia or leopard orchid, however, it may in fact be a complex group of species which share common floral structure and growth habit.

The plants are found throughout tropical and subtropical Africa. It was named after John Ansell, an English assistant botanist. who found the first specimens in 1841 on the Fernando Po Island in West Africa. This genus is sometimes abbreviated as Ansel or Aslla in horticultural trade.

It is referred to along with Grammatophyllum as a "trash basket" orchid due to its habit of creating a makeshift container of aerial roots to catch falling leaf litter for nutrients.

== Distribution and habitat ==
This orchid is native to tropical and southern Africa, found alongside coasts and rivers in the canopy of trees, usually at elevations lower than 700 m (2,300 ft) (occasionally up to 2,200 m (7,200 ft)).

== Description ==
This is a large, perennial, and epiphyte, or at times a terrestrial plant, growing in sometimes spectacular clumps, attached to the branches of tall trees. The white, needle-like, aerial roots are characteristic for this orchid. They point upwards, taking the form of a basket around the tall, many-noded, fusiform, canelike, yellow pseudobulbs, catching the decaying leaves and detritus upon which the plant feeds. These pseudobulbs can develop a gigantic size, up to 60 cm (24 in) long. This robust orchid can grow very large, sometimes with an estimated weight over a tonne. Even eagle owls (Bubo bubo) have been seen to make their nest in such a clump.

The roots which penetrate the substrate can become very thick and cord-like to support the weight of the plants, and are typically very different in form than the roots which comprise the trash basket as the aerial roots are non-absorbing. Breakdown and absorption of nutrients by the plant from the trash basket is performed by its fungal symbionts and the active absorbing roots.

These pseudobulbs carry on their top 6 to 7, narrowly ligulate-lanceolate, acute, plicate, leathery leaves. They give rise to a paniculate inflorescence, up to 85 cm (33 in) long, with many (10 to 100), delicately scented flowers, 6 cm (2.4 in) across.

The three-lobed lip grows into three yellow projections. The tepals are yellow or greenish yellow, lightly or heavily marked with brown spots. The flowers are short-lived, seldom lasting longer than 10 days, but are produced in abundance provided the plants have received high light levels throughout the year.

== Cultivation ==
An easy species to grow, in cultivation the plants usually bloom with a terminal inflorescence from the older pseudobulbs, some plants however, will produce flowers from newer pseudobulbs in odd years. These plants are shy to flower in cultivation unless they receive very bright light of around 2000 foot candles and given a dry rest for about 6 weeks in the fall. In habitat, the plants can go periods of several months without water, and are very drought tolerant, but the plants tend to perform better if kept evenly moist throughout the year. Plants which are receiving enough light will take on a yellowish coloration in the leaves. This is normal as these plants use CAM photosynthesis. Plants with very green leaves are not receiving enough light.

The plants are fungal magnets in habitat and in cultivation and tend to culture mychorrhizal fungi they pick up from their environment since this species is a trash basket orchid that in nature creates a network of interlocked airborne roots to collect leaf litter, they have a tendency to rapidly break down their growing medium more so than other species of orchids. Unlike most epiphytic orchids, the roots of this species are not appreciably photosynthetic, are white and pale, and resemble the roots of terrestrial and mycoheterotrophic orchids.

When the plants are not getting enough nitrogen, they will start growing a trash basket with numerous non-absorbing roots growing upwards. These plants do not produce a trash basket if they are receiving sufficient nitrogen regularly.

These plants in habitat usually bloom at the end of dry spells, however, this species has a unique habit of blooming at any time of the year and several times a year if the plants have been grown in high light levels and are subjected to short dry spells of 4–6 weeks every 6 months. There is wide variability of flower shape, color, and markings, and this species is widespread across Africa.

== Gallery ==
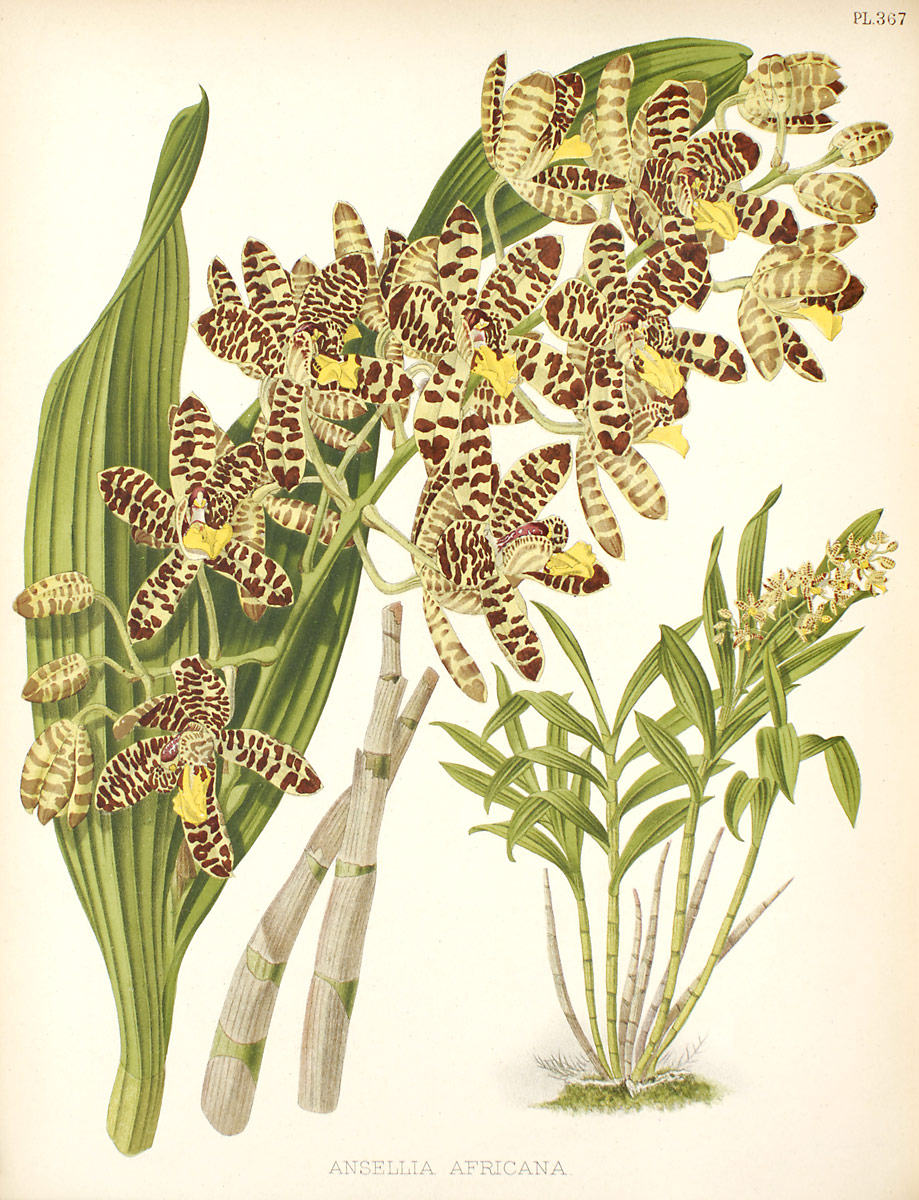
Illustration of Ansellia africana from B.S. Williams, R. Warner The Orchid Album, 1889

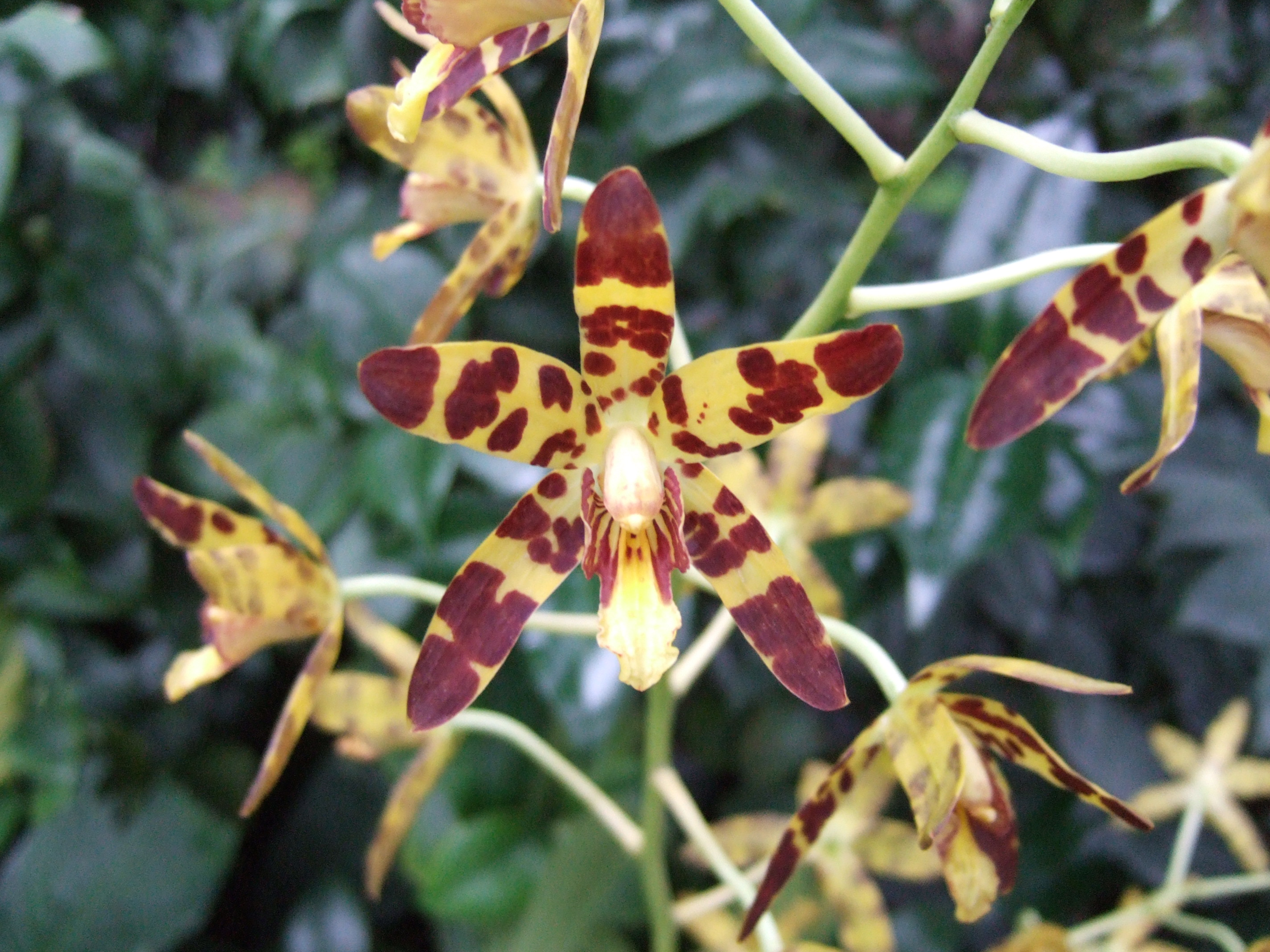
Ansellia africana

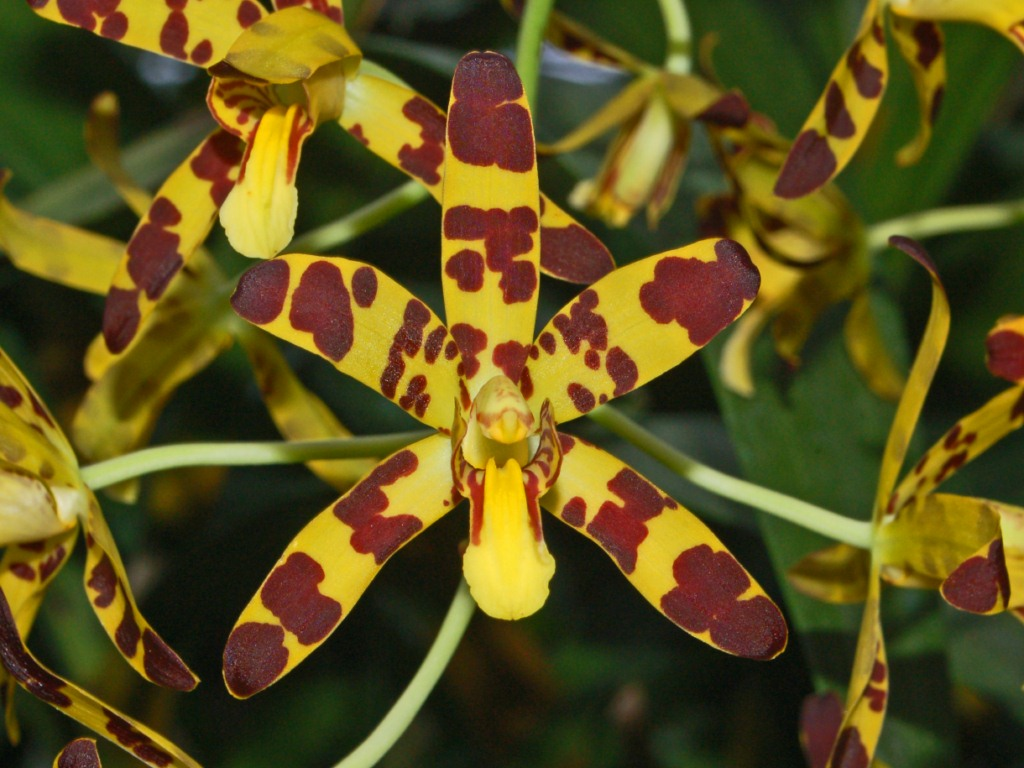
Ansellia africana

== Intergeneric hybrids ==
The Royal Horticultural Society International Orchid Register lists crosses between Ansellia and nine other genera:

- × Anaphorchis (× Graphorkis)
- × Ansidium (× Cymbidium)
- × Catasellia (× Catasetum)
- × Cycsellia (× Cychnoches)
- × Cyrtellia (× Cyrtopodium)
- × Eulosellia (× Eulophia)
- × Galeansellia (× Galeandra)
- × Promellia (× Promenaea)

== Synonyms ==
- Ansellia confusa N.E.Brown 1886
- Ansellia congoensis Rodigas 1886
- Ansellia gigantea Rchb.f 1847
- Ansellia gigantea subsp. nilotica (Baker) Senghas 1990
- Ansellia gigantea var. nilotica (Baker) Summerh. 1937
- Ansellia humilis W.Bull 1891 (Note: Some sources attribute the 1891 description of A. humilis to Bull. or Bulliard (i.e. Pierre Bulliard, 1752-1793). The dates suggest that this is an error.)
- Ansellia nilotica Baker N.E.Brown 1886
- Cymbidium sandersoni Harv. 1868
