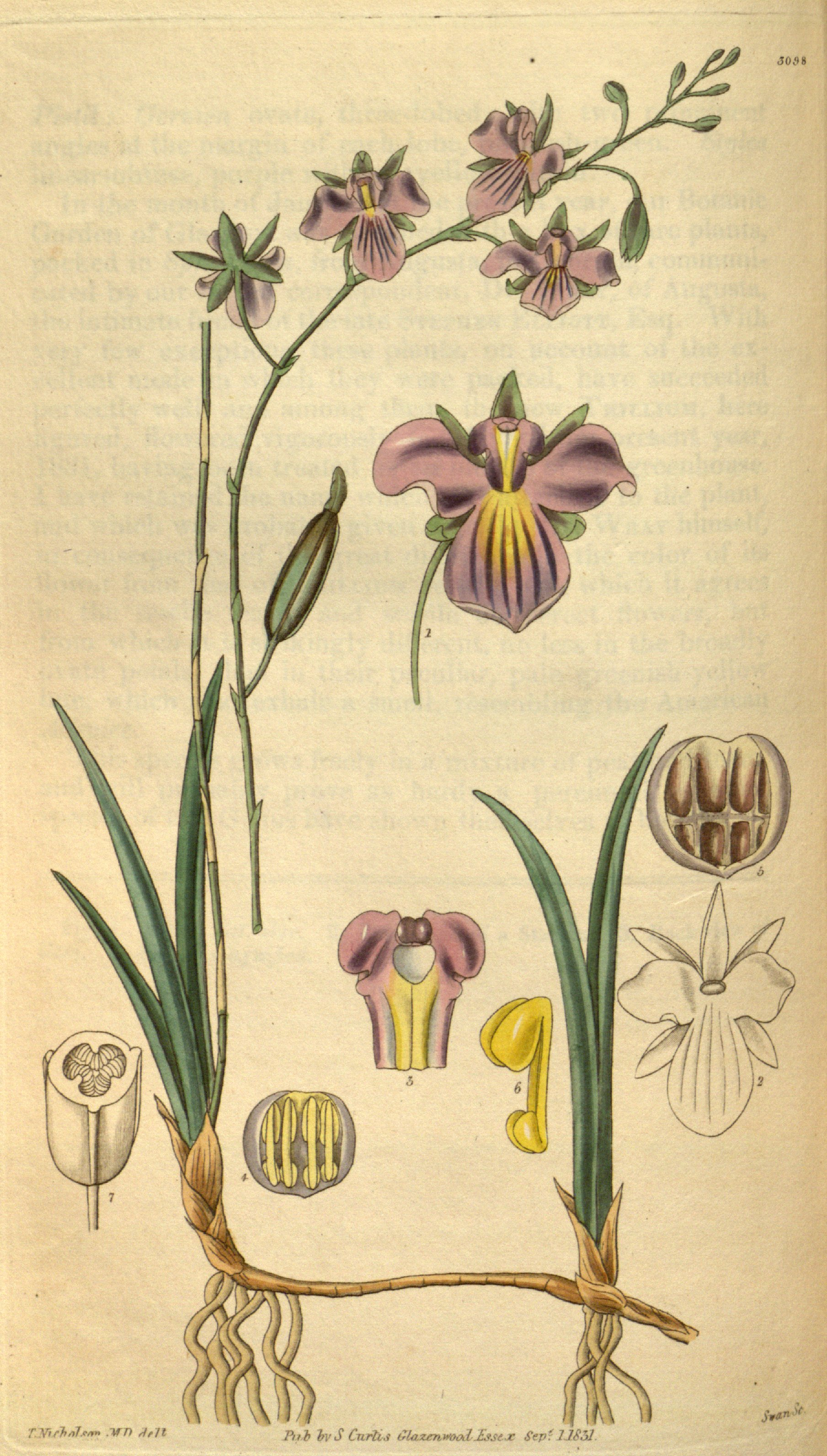
- Tetramicra elegans (as syn. Brassavola elegans) - Illustration in Curtis's Botanical Magazine, vol. 58 (N.S. 5) pl. 3098 (1831)

Scientific classification
- Kingdom: Plantae
- Clade: Tracheophytes
- Clade: Angiosperms
- Clade: Monocots
- Order: Asparagales
- Family: Orchidaceae
- Subfamily: Epidendroideae
- Genus: Tetramicra
- Species: T. canaliculata

Binomial name
- Tetramicra canaliculata (Aubl.) Urb. (1918)

Synonyms
- Limodorum canaliculatum Aubl., 1775; Epidendrum canaliculatum (Aubl.) Poir. in J.B.A.M.de Lamarck, 1810.; Cymbidium rigidum Willd., 1806; Cyrtopodium elegans Ham., 1825; Brassavola elegans (Ham.) Hook., 1831; Tetramicra rigida (Willd.) Lindl., 1831; Oncidium elegans (Ham.) Beer, 1854; Bletia rigida (Willd.) Rchb.f. in W.G.Walpers, 1862; Bletia schomburgkii Rchb.f. in W.G.Walpers, 1862; Epidendrum subaequale Eggers, 1879; Bletia subaequalis (Eggers) Rchb.f., 1886; Tetramicra schomburgkii (Rchb.f.) Rolfe, 1889; Brassavola rigida (Willd.) Bold., 1909; Tetramicra elegans (Ham.) Cogn. in I.Urban, 1910

= Tetramicra canaliculata =

Species of orchid

Tetramicra canaliculata is a species of orchids in the subtribe Laeliinae. It is found in Florida, Hispaniola, Puerto Rico, Trinidad and the Lesser Antilles. It is the type species of its genus.
