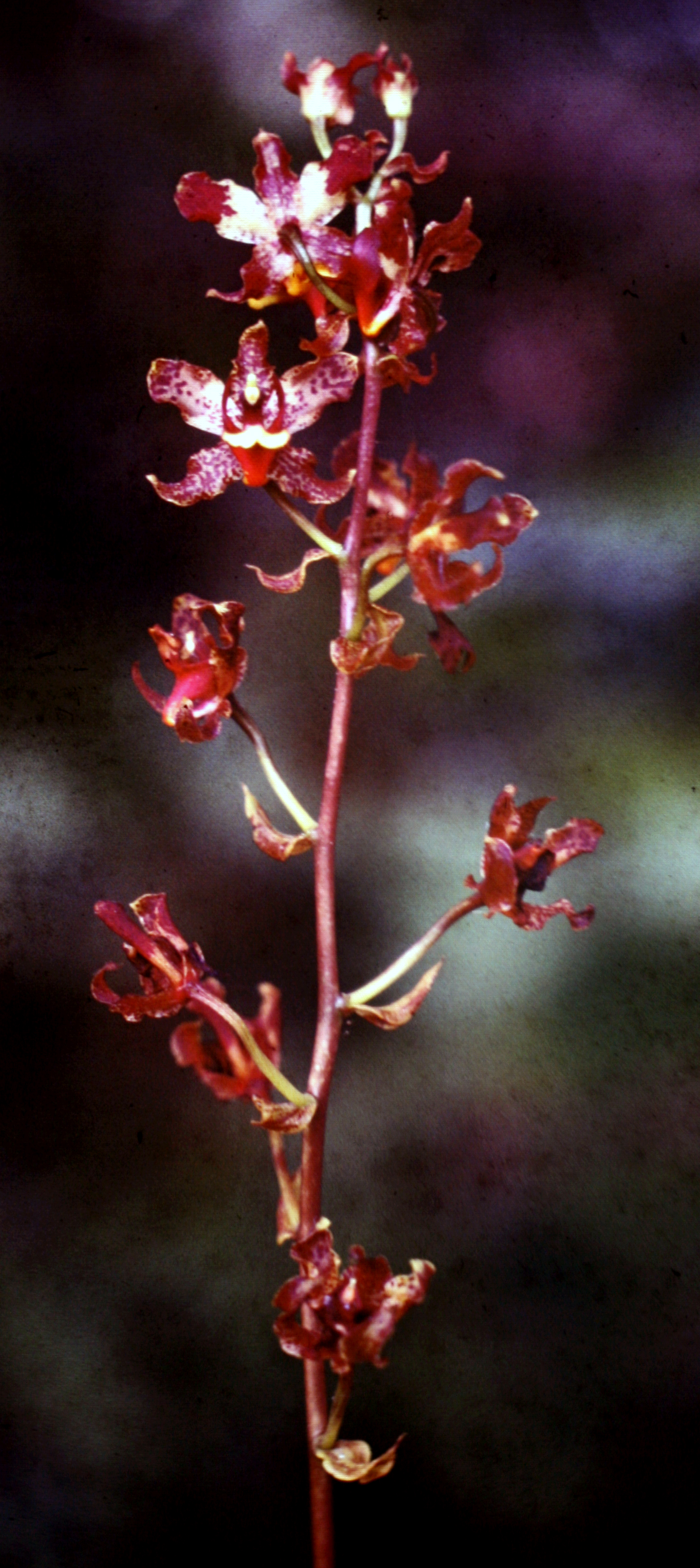

Scientific classification
- Kingdom: Plantae
- Clade: Tracheophytes
- Clade: Angiosperms
- Clade: Monocots
- Order: Asparagales
- Family: Orchidaceae
- Subfamily: Epidendroideae
- Genus: Cyrtopodium
- Species: C. parviflorum

Binomial name
- Cyrtopodium parviflorum Lindl. (1843)

Synonyms
- Cyrtopodium falcilobum Hoehne & Schltr. (1921); Cyrtopodium broadwayi Ames (1922); Cyrtopodium paynei Ruschi (1969)

= Cyrtopodium parviflorum =

Species of orchid

Cyrtopodium parviflorum is a species of orchid. It is native to Trinidad and to South America (Venezuela, Brazil, Bolivia and the Guianas).
