= × Galeansellia =

Scientific classification
- Kingdom: Plantae
- Clade: Tracheophytes
- Clade: Angiosperms
- Clade: Monocots
- Order: Asparagales
- Family: Orchidaceae
- Subfamily: Epidendroideae
- Tribe: Cymbidieae
- Genus: × Galeansellia hort.

Genus of orchids

× Galeansellia, abbreviated in trade journals Gslla, is an intergeneric hybrid between the orchid genera Ansellia and Galeandra (Aslla × Gal).
