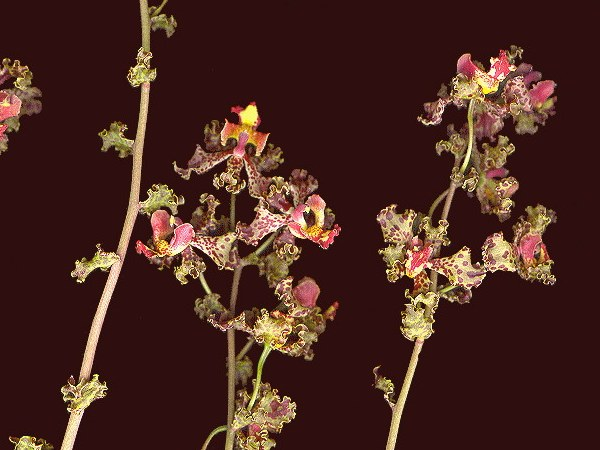

Scientific classification
- Kingdom: Plantae
- Clade: Tracheophytes
- Clade: Angiosperms
- Clade: Monocots
- Order: Asparagales
- Family: Orchidaceae
- Subfamily: Epidendroideae
- Genus: Cyrtopodium
- Species: C. aliciae

Binomial name
- Cyrtopodium aliciae L. Linden & Rolfe (1892)

Synonyms
- Cyrtopodium edmundoi Pabst (1971)

= Cyrtopodium aliciae =

Species of orchid

Cyrtopodium aliciae is a species of orchid endemic to Brazil.
