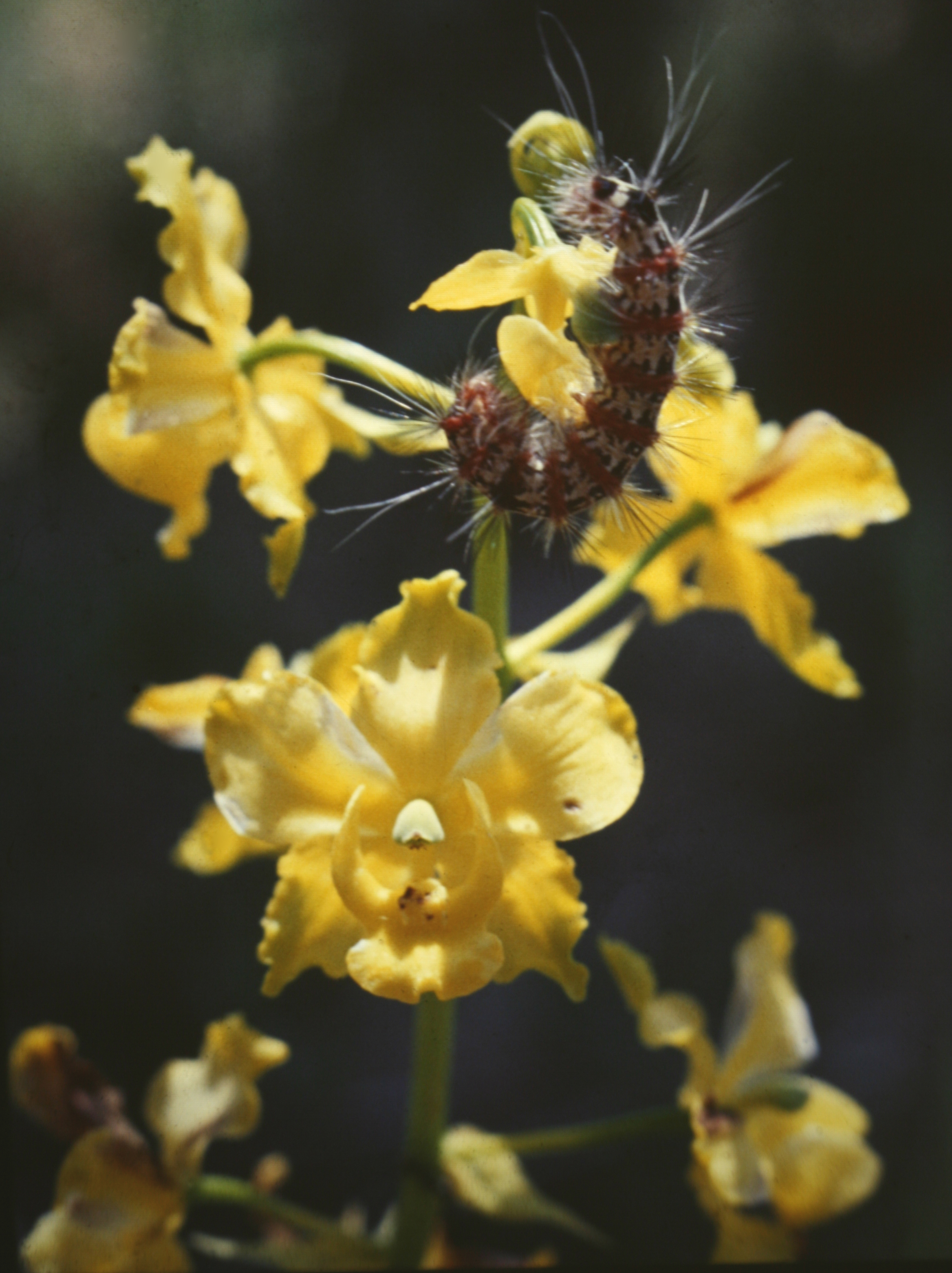

Scientific classification
- Kingdom: Plantae
- Clade: Tracheophytes
- Clade: Angiosperms
- Clade: Monocots
- Order: Asparagales
- Family: Orchidaceae
- Subfamily: Epidendroideae
- Genus: Cyrtopodium
- Species: C. cristatum

Binomial name
- Cyrtopodium cristatum Lindl. (1841)

= Cyrtopodium cristatum =

Species of orchid

Cyrtopodium cristatum is a species of orchid native to South America (Brazil, Venezuela, Colombia and the Guianas).
