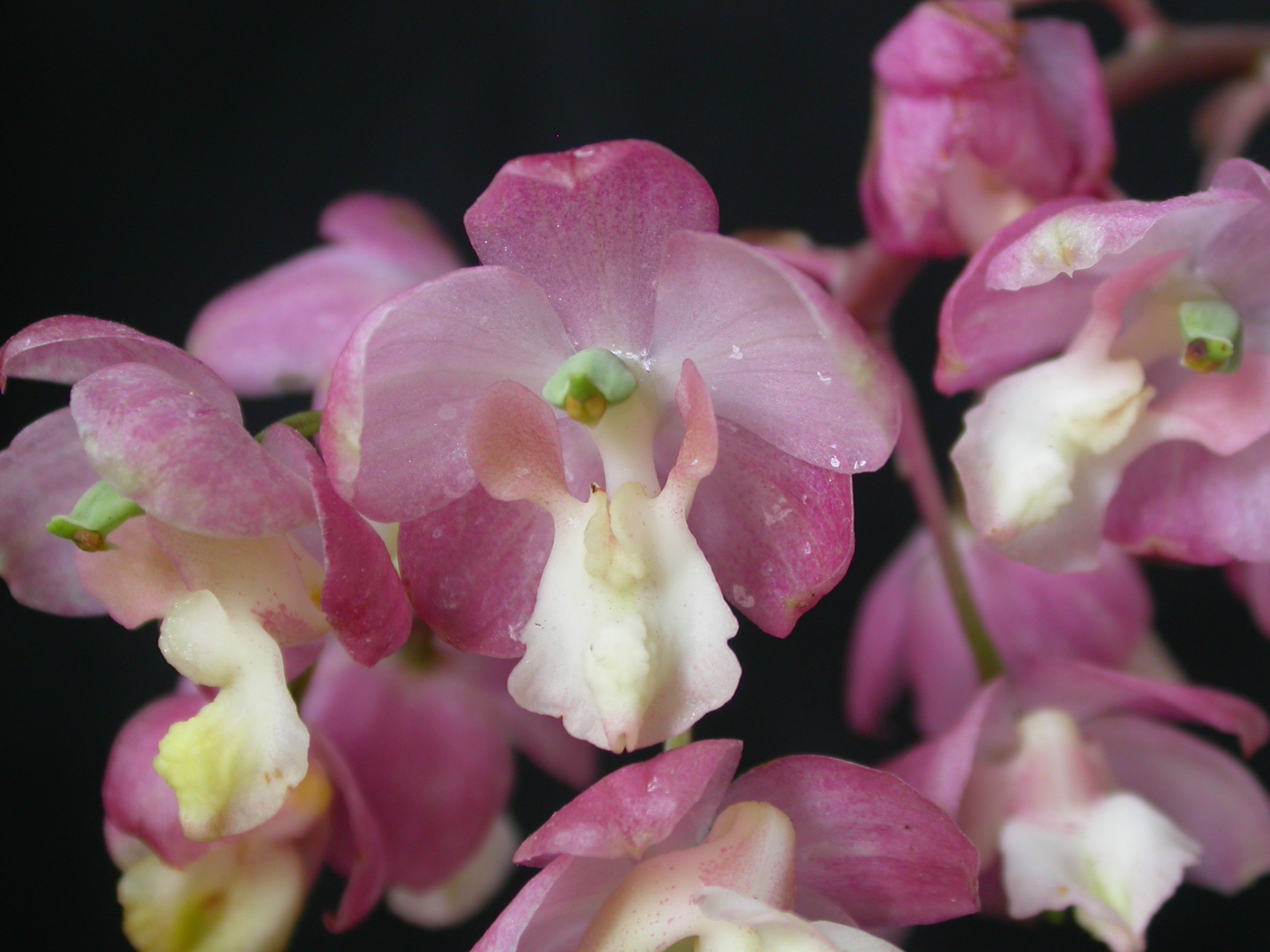

Scientific classification
- Kingdom: Plantae
- Clade: Tracheophytes
- Clade: Angiosperms
- Clade: Monocots
- Order: Asparagales
- Family: Orchidaceae
- Subfamily: Epidendroideae
- Genus: Cyrtopodium
- Species: C. hatschbachii

Binomial name
- Cyrtopodium hatschbachii Pabst (1978)

Synonyms
- Cyrtopodium bradei Schltr. ex Hoehne (1942), invalid, no description

= Cyrtopodium hatschbachii =

Species of orchid

Cyrtopodium hatschbachii is a species of orchid. It is native to Brazil, Argentina and Paraguay.
