= Cyrtopodium longibulbosum =

Scientific classification
- Kingdom: Plantae
- Clade: Tracheophytes
- Clade: Angiosperms
- Clade: Monocots
- Order: Asparagales
- Family: Orchidaceae
- Subfamily: Epidendroideae
- Genus: Cyrtopodium
- Species: C. longibulbosum

Binomial name
- Cyrtopodium longibulbosum Dodson & G.A.Romero

Species of orchid

Cyrtopodium longibulbosum, the cana-cana, of the Ecuadorian Amazon and adjacent Peru and possibly Colombia is the largest Orchid species in the Western Hemisphere with large clusters of pseudobulbs each up to 11 ft 6 in (3.51 meters) in length by about two inches (5.1 cm) in width, yet it remained unknown to science until 1993.

This orchid is exceeded in size only by Grammatophyllum speciosum, The Golden Orchid (Dendrobium discolor) and Bulbophyllum beccarii.

The orchid flowers twice a year with 1.75 inches (4.4 cm) fragrant flowers having three red and yellow splashed sepals, two pale yellow petals and a nearly black column arranged in inflorescences up to five feet (1.5 meters) in length.
