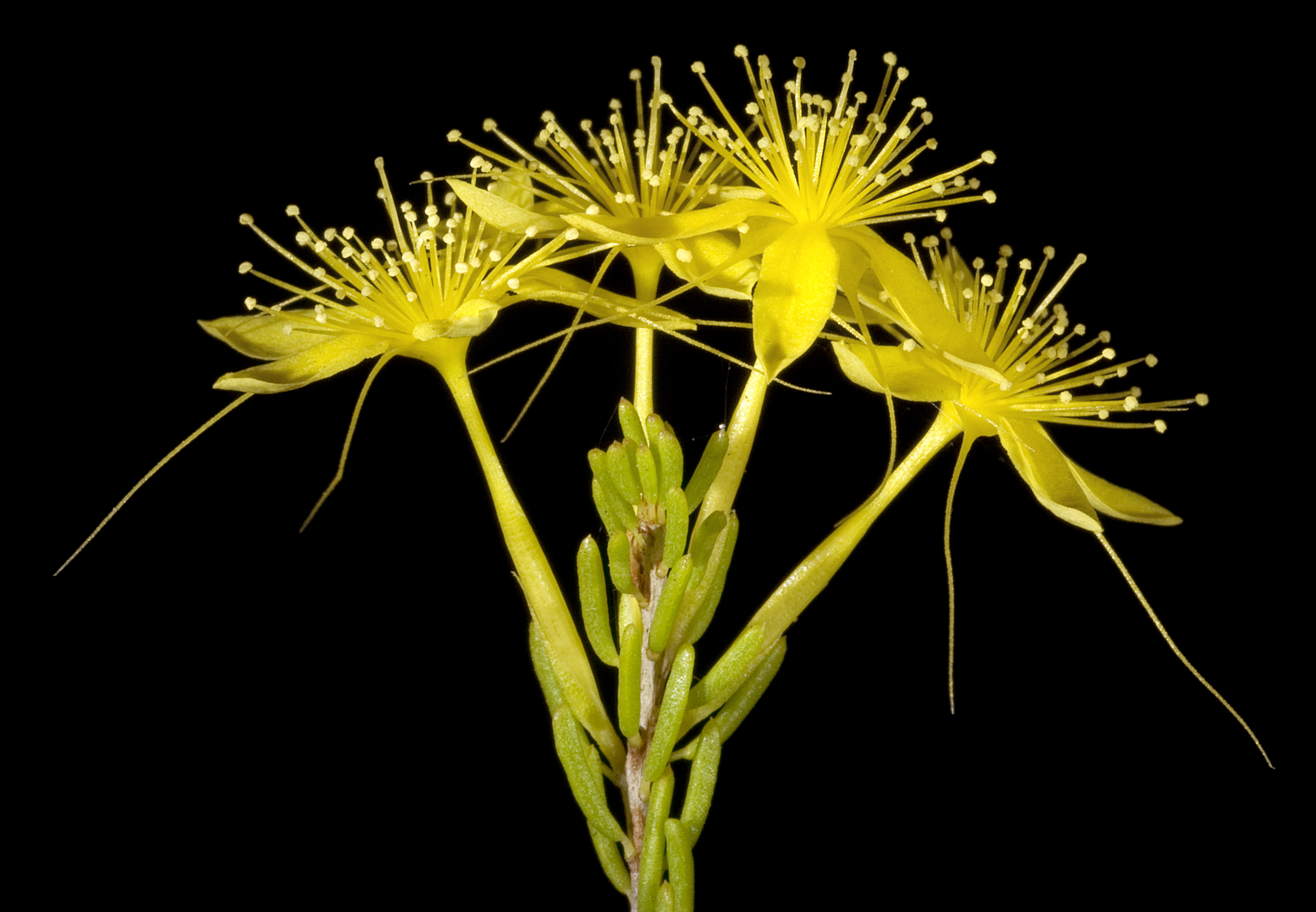

Scientific classification
- Kingdom: Plantae
- Clade: Tracheophytes
- Clade: Angiosperms
- Clade: Eudicots
- Clade: Rosids
- Order: Myrtales
- Family: Myrtaceae
- Genus: Calytrix
- Species: C. flavescens

Binomial name
- Calytrix flavescens A.Cunn.

Synonyms
- List: Calycothrix flavescens (A.Cunn.) Schauer; Calycothrix flavescens (A.Cunn.) Fielding & Gardner nom. illeg.; Calycothrix puberula Meisn.; Calycothrix tenella Meisn.; Calycothrix tetragonophylla Meisn.; Calythrix flavescens orth. var.; Calythrix flavescens A.Cunn. var. flavescens orth. var.; Calythrix flavescens var. tenella Benth. orth. var.; Calythrix puberula Benth. orth. var.; Calythrix tenella (Meisn.) Benth. nom. inval., pro syn.; Calythrix tetragonophylla Benth. nom. inval., pro syn.; Calytrix flavescens A.Cunn.var. flavescens; Calytrix flavescens var. tenella (Meisn.) Benth.; Calytrix puberula (Meisn.) Benth.

= Calytrix flavescens =

Species of flowering plant

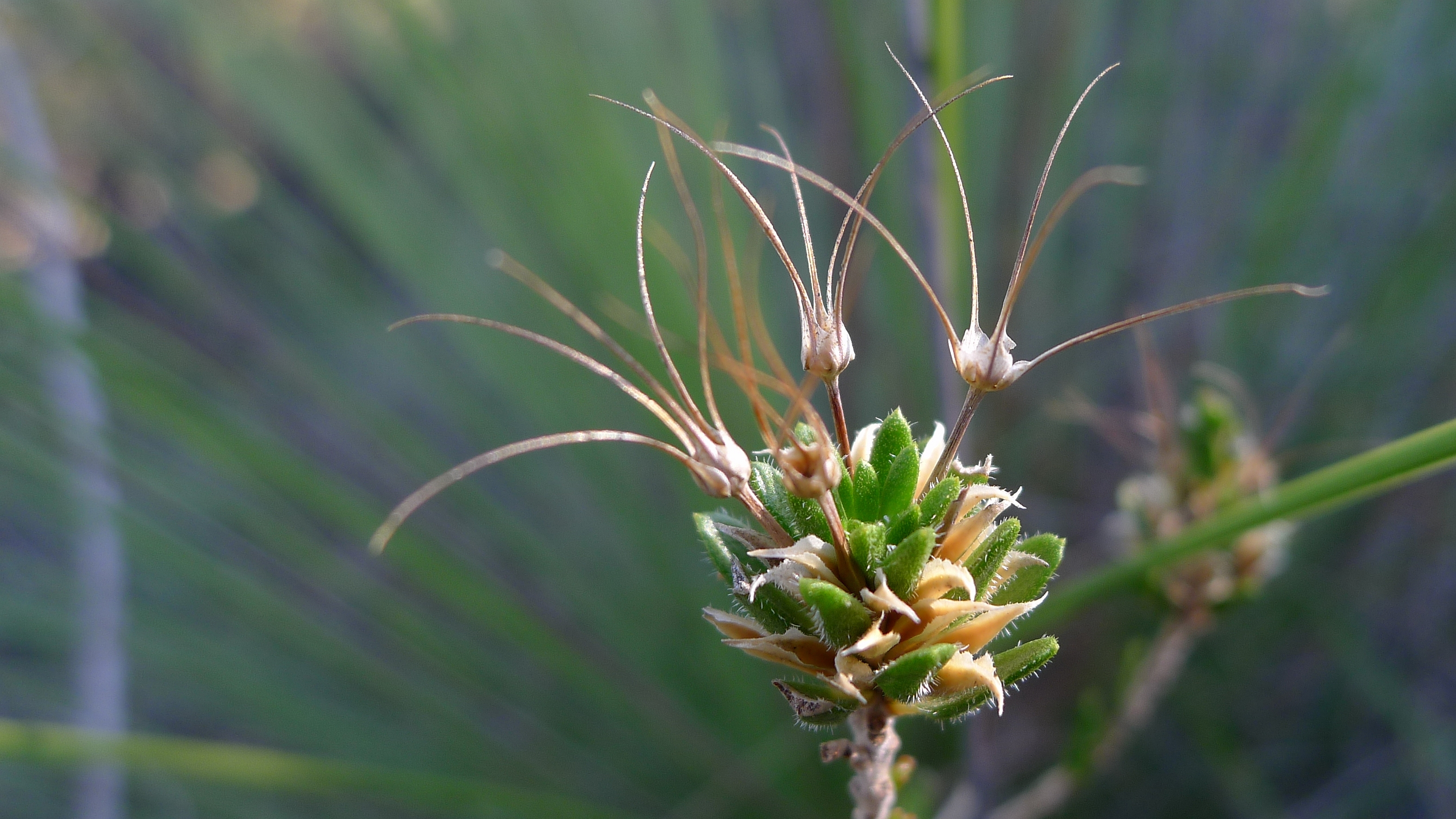
Seed head

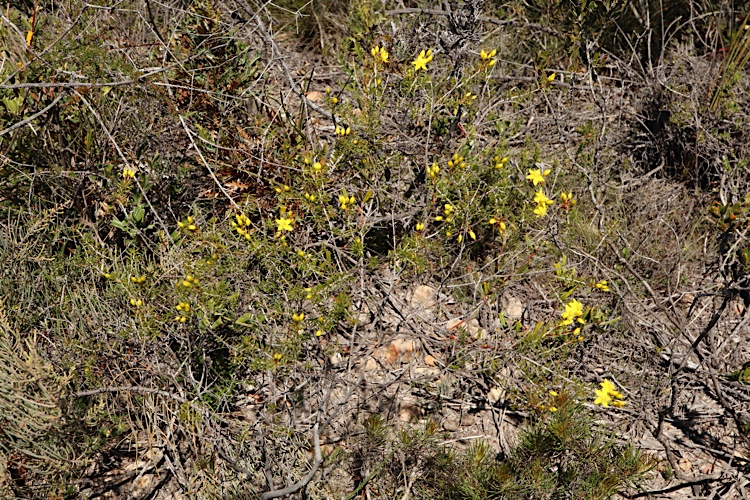
Habit

Calytrix flavescens, commonly known as summer starflower, is a species of flowering plant in the myrtle family Myrtaceae and is endemic to the south-west of Western Australia. It is a shrub with linear to narrowly elliptic leaves, and yellow flowers with about 35 to 60 stamens in several rows.

== Description ==
Calytrix flavescens is a shrub that typically grows to a height of 30–80 cm (12–31 in). Its leaves are linear to narrowly elliptic, mostly 4–9 mm (0.16–0.35 in) long and 0.5–1.5 mm (0.020–0.059 in) wide on a petiole 0.25–1.0 mm (0.0098–0.0394 in) long. The flowers are borne on a peduncle 0.6–1.25 mm (0.024–0.049 in) long with egg-shaped to lance-shaped bracteoles 5–9 mm (0.20–0.35 in) long. The floral tube is glabrous, 7–15 mm (0.28–0.59 in), fused to the style and usually has 10 ribs. The sepals are fused at the base, with more or less round to broadly egg-shaped lobes 1.5–2.75 mm (0.059–0.108 in) long and 1.5–2.5 mm (0.059–0.098 in) wide, with an awn up to 14 mm (0.55 in) long. The petals are glabrous, yellow, egg-shaped to lance-shaped 5.5–10 mm (0.22–0.39 in) long and 3.5–4.0 mm (0.14–0.16 in) wide, and there are about 35 to 60 stamens in several rows. Flowering usually occurs between October and January.

== Taxonomy ==
Calytrix flavescens was first formally described in 1834 by the botanist Allan Cunningham in 1834 in the journal Botanical Magazine. The specific epithet (flavescens) means 'pale yellow' or 'yellowish', referring to the flowers.

== Distribution and habitat ==
Summer starflower grows on sand-plains, gentle slopes and sometimes in winter-wet areas from the Arrowsmith River district and southwards to the Blackwood River district in the Avon Wheatbelt, Esperance Plains, Geraldton Sandplains, Jarrah Forest, Mallee, Swan Coastal Plain and Warren bioregions of south-western Western Australia, where it grows on sandy soils over granite, laterite or sandstone.
