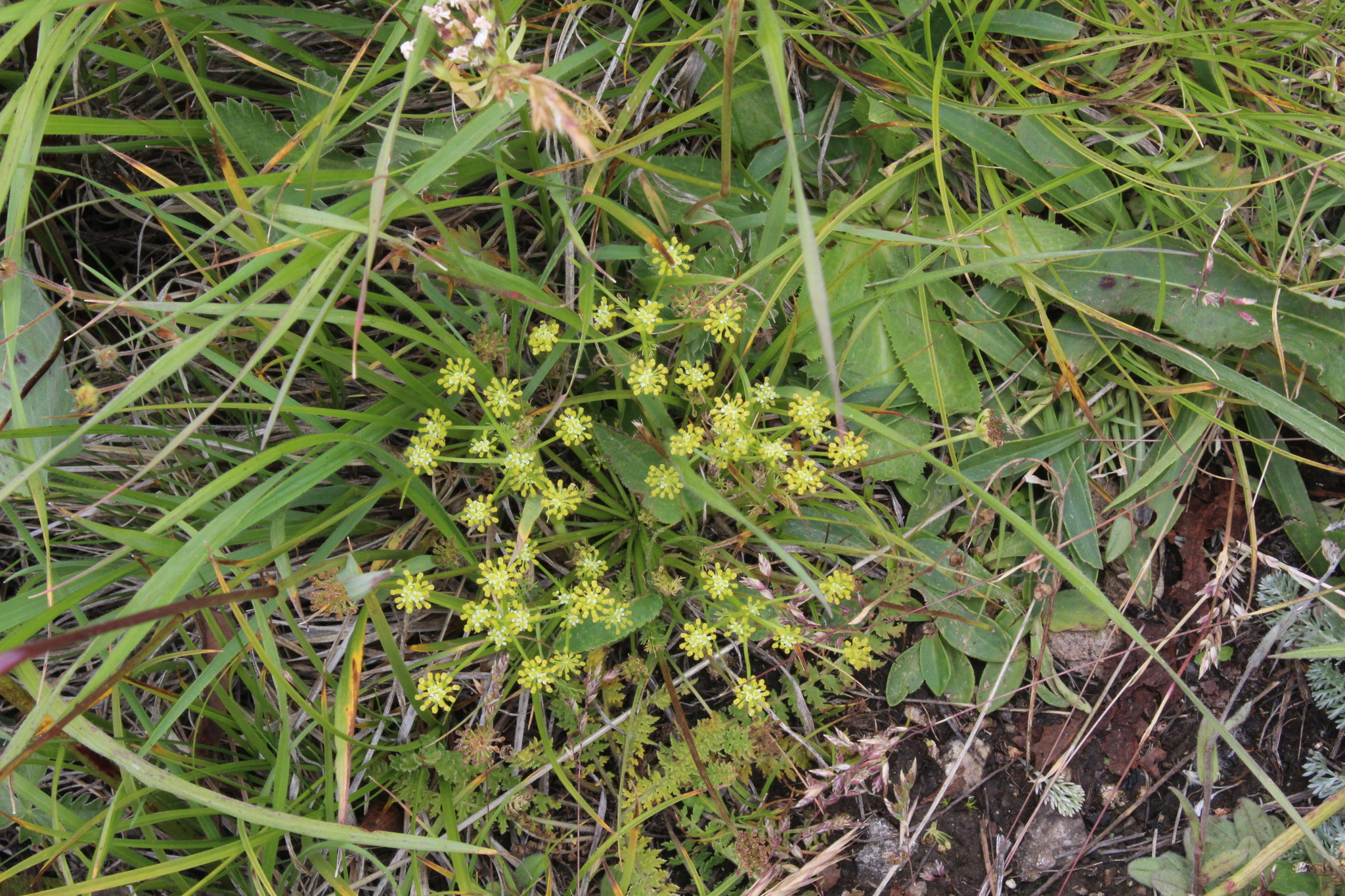
- Chamaesciadium acaule in southern Russia

Scientific classification
- Kingdom: Plantae
- Clade: Tracheophytes
- Clade: Angiosperms
- Clade: Eudicots
- Clade: Asterids
- Order: Apiales
- Family: Apiaceae
- Subfamily: Apioideae
- Tribe: Careae
- Genus: Chamaesciadium; C.A.Mey.
- Species: C. flavescens

Binomial name
- Chamaesciadium flavescens C.A.Mey.

= Chamaesciadium =

Genus of flowering plants

Chamaesciadium acaule is a species of flowering plant in the family Apiaceae, the only species of the genus Chamaesciadium. It is found in Southwest Asia and the Caucasus.
