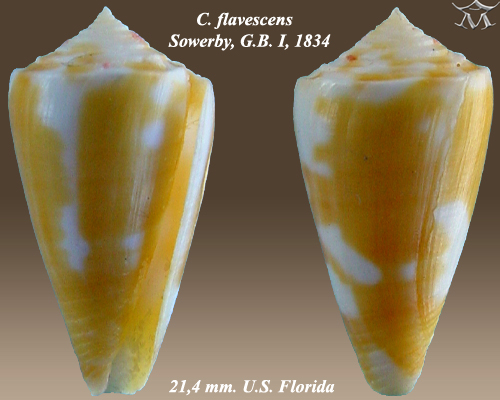
- Apertural and abapertural views of shell of Conus flavescens Sowerby, G.B. I, 1834

Conservation status
- Least Concern (IUCN 3.1)

Scientific classification
- Kingdom: Animalia
- Phylum: Mollusca
- Class: Gastropoda
- Subclass: Caenogastropoda
- Order: Neogastropoda
- Superfamily: Conoidea
- Family: Conidae
- Genus: Conus
- Species: C. flavescens

Binomial name
- Conus flavescens G. B. Sowerby I, 1834

Synonyms
- Conus (Dauciconus) flavescens G. B. Sowerby I, 1834 · accepted, alternate representation; Conus flavescens flavescens G. B. Sowerby I, 1834 · accepted, alternate representation; Conus fulvus Fenaux, 1943 (invalid: junior homonym of Conus fulvus Schröter, 1803, and C. fulvus G. B. Sowerby III, 1889); Gradiconus flavescens (G. B. Sowerby I, 1834); Gradiconus flavescens flavescens (G. B. Sowerby I, 1834); Tuckericonus flavescens (G. B. Sowerby I, 1834); Tuckericonus flavescens flavescens (G. B. Sowerby I, 1834)

= Conus flavescens =

Species of sea snail

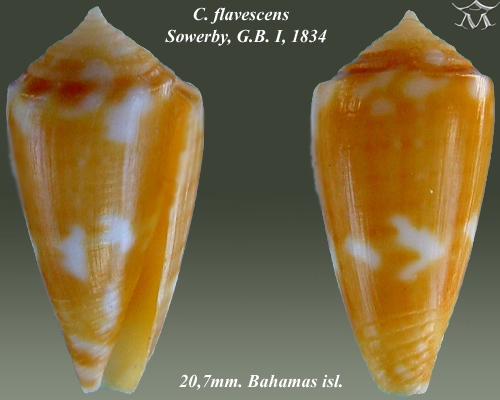
Conus flavescens Sowerby, G.B. I, 1834

Conus flavescens, common name the flame cone, is a species of sea snail, a marine gastropod mollusk in the family Conidae, the cone snails and their allies.

There is one subspecies: Conus flavescens caribbaeus Clench, 1942 (synonyms: Conus caribbaeus Clench, 1942, Gradiconus flavescens caribbaeus (Clench, 1942), Tuckericonus caribbaeus (Clench, 1942), Tuckericonus flavescens caribbaeus (Clench, 1942))

Like all species within the genus Conus, these snails are predatory and venomous. They are capable of stinging humans, therefore live ones should be handled carefully or not at all.

== Distribution ==
Locus typicus: "Sowerby (1858) gave South Australia as the type locality which is incorrect. Clench (1942) suggested that "the original specimens may have come from the Bahamas". This area is here selected Locus typicus."

This marine species occurs in the Caribbean Sea and the Gulf of Mexico off Florida, USA, the Greater Antilles and off the Bahamas.

== Description ==
The maximum recorded shell length is 25 mm. The smooth shell is grooved towards the base. Its color is yellowish, variegated with large irregular white blotches, arranged mostly just below the shoulder angle, and below the middle of the body whorl, so as to form two interrupted bands.

== Habitat ==
Minimum recorded depth is 0 m. Maximum recorded depth is 122 m.

== Gallery ==
Below are several color forms:

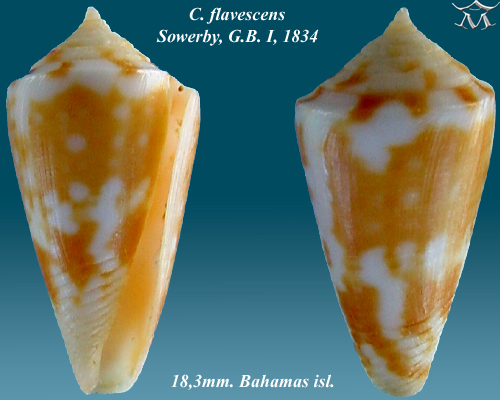
Conus flavescens Sowerby, G.B. I, 1834

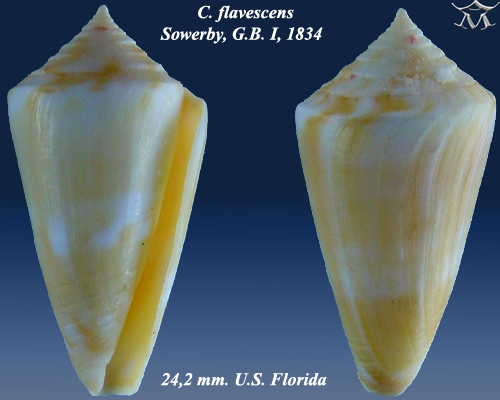
Conus flavescens Sowerby, G.B. I, 1834

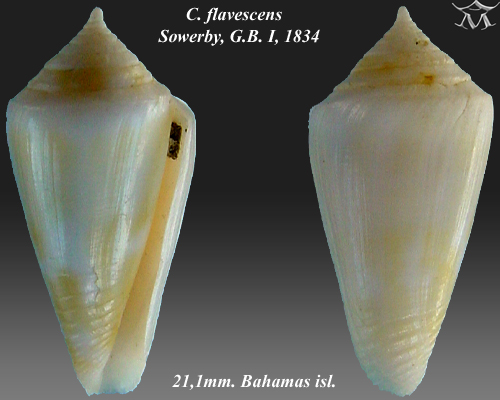
Conus flavescens Sowerby, G.B. I, 1834

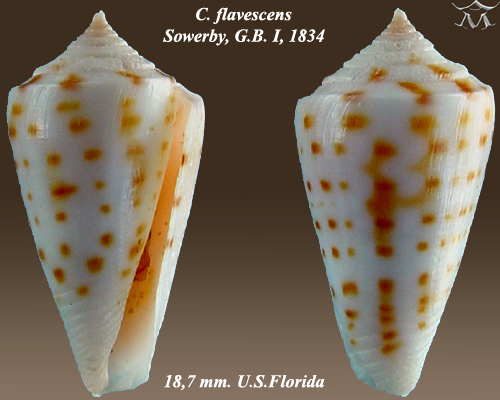
Conus flavescens Sowerby, G.B. I, 1834

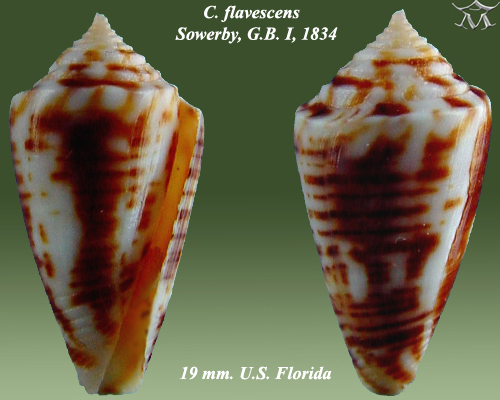
Conus flavescens Sowerby, G.B. I, 1834

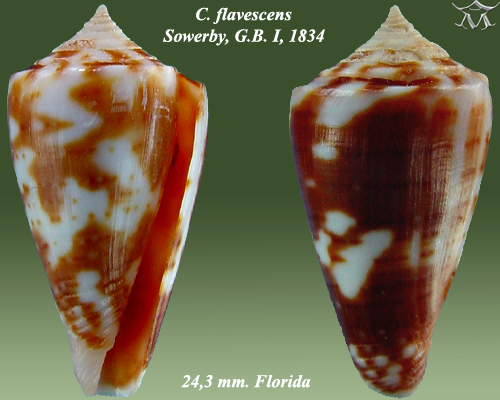
Conus flavescens Sowerby, G.B. I, 1834

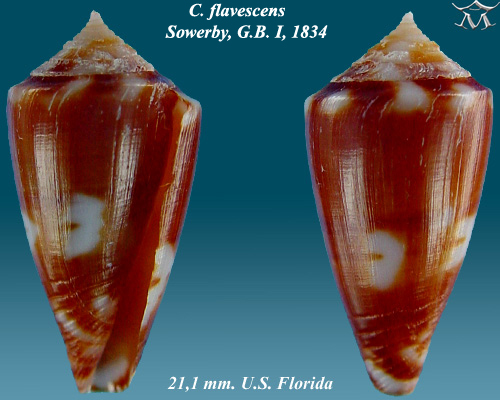
Conus flavescens Sowerby, G.B. I, 1834

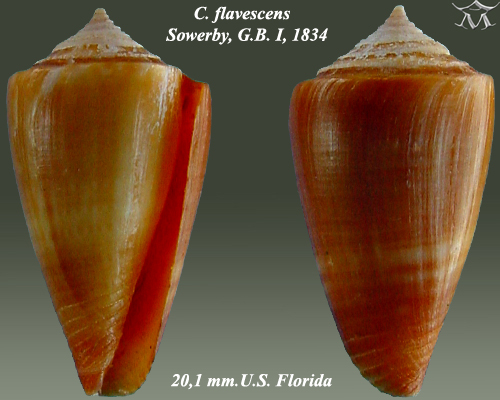
Conus flavescens Sowerby, G.B. I, 1834
