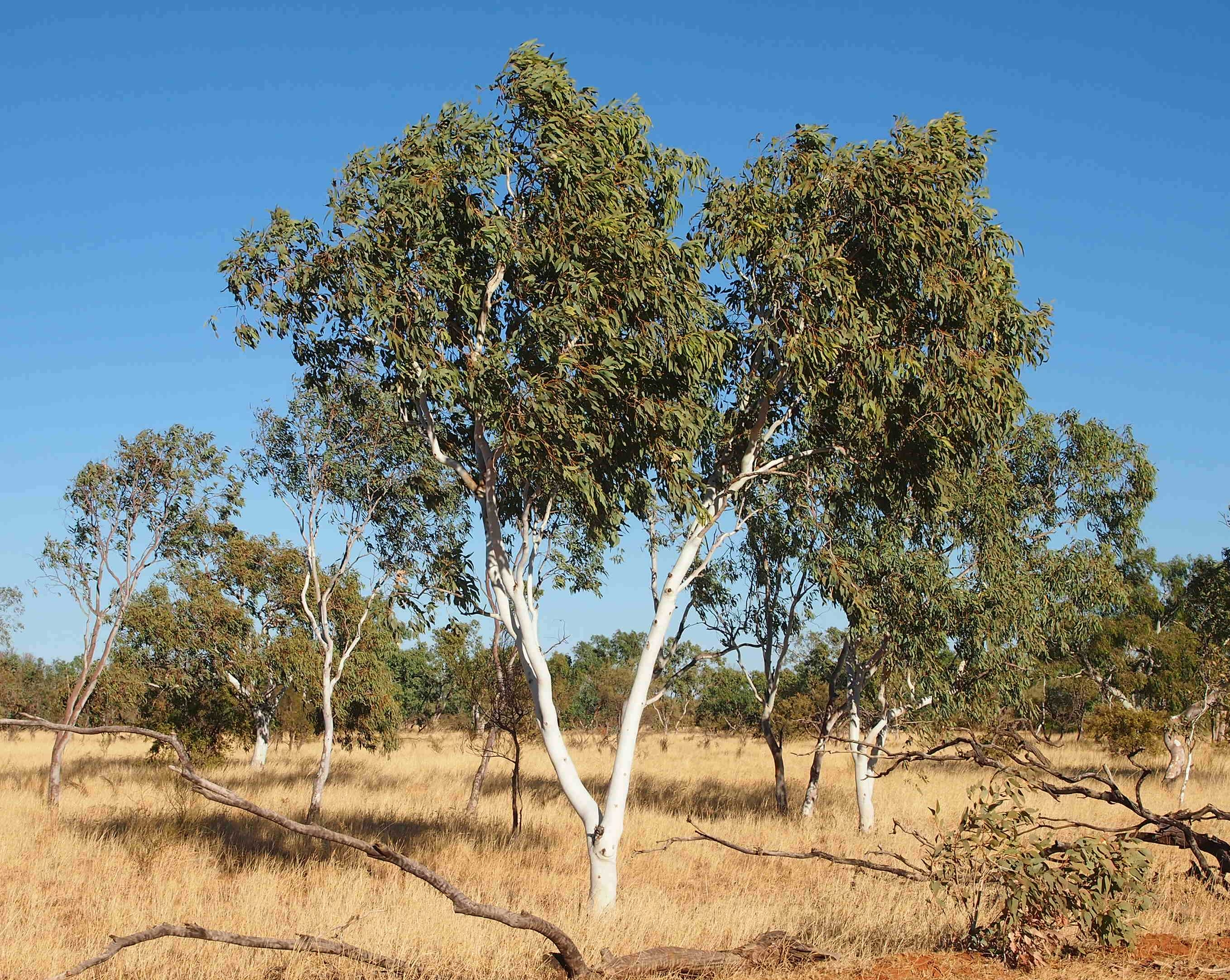

Scientific classification
- Kingdom: Plantae
- Clade: Tracheophytes
- Clade: Angiosperms
- Clade: Eudicots
- Clade: Rosids
- Order: Myrtales
- Family: Myrtaceae
- Genus: Corymbia
- Species: C. flavescens

Binomial name
- Corymbia flavescens K.D.Hill & L.A.S.Johnson

Synonyms
- Eucalyptus flavescens K.D.Hill & L.A.S.Johnson

= Corymbia flavescens =

Cabbage ghost gum

Species of plant

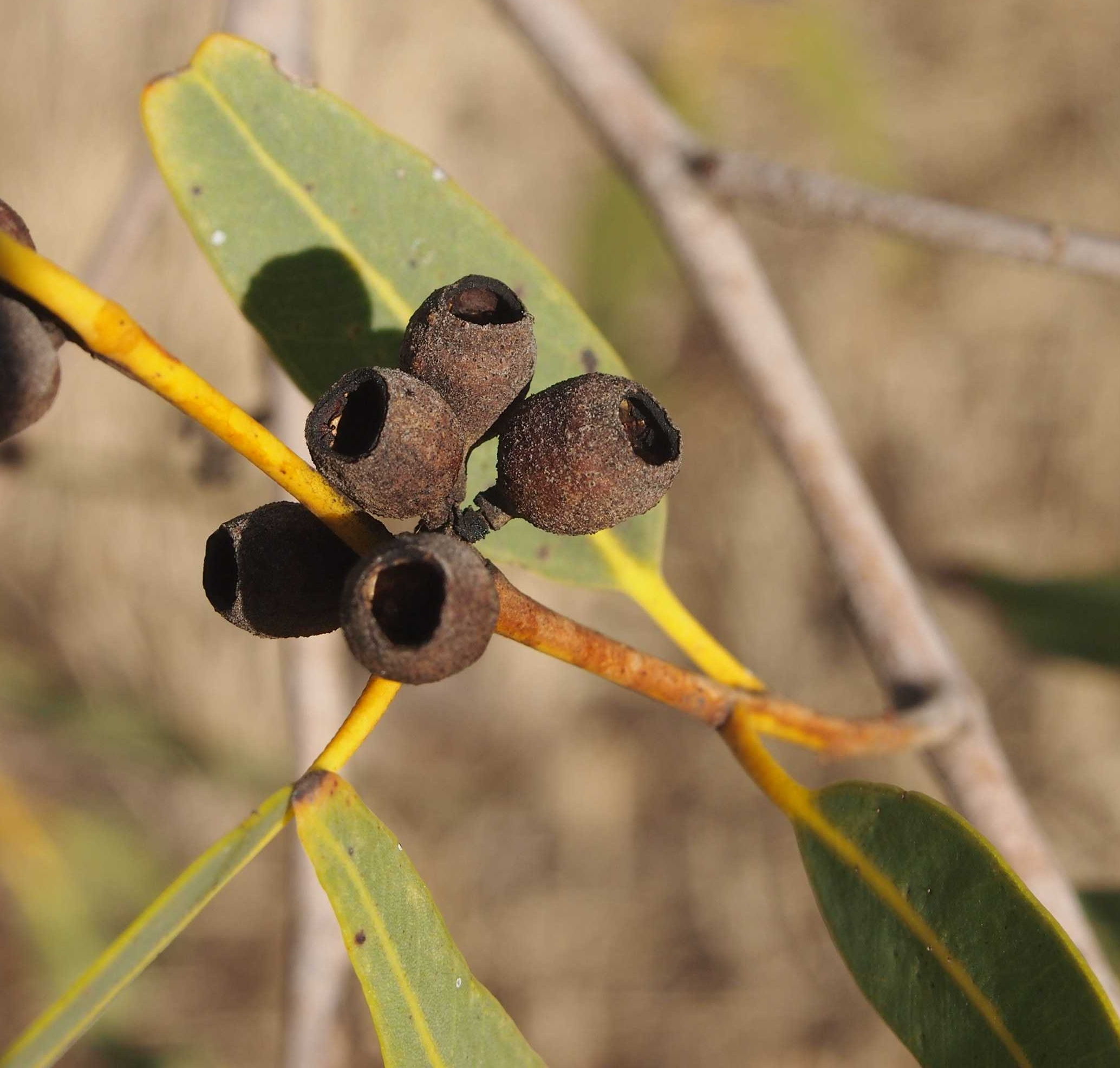
fruit

Corymbia flavescens, commonly known as cabbage ghost gum, bastard ghost gum, scraggy cabbage gum, or wrinkle-leaf ghost gum, is a species of tree that is endemic to northern Australia. It has smooth powdery bark, egg-shaped to lance-shaped adult leaves, flower buds in groups of three, white flowers and variably-shaped fruit. The Jaru peoples know it as warlarri.

== Description ==
Corymbia flavescens is a tree that typically grows to a height of 15 m (49 ft) and forms a lignotuber. It has smooth, powdery bark that is bright white when new and is shed in thin, greyish scales. Young plants and coppice regrowth have leaves that are yellowish green, heart-shaped to egg-shaped, 70–155 mm (2.8–6.1 in) long and 45–110 mm (1.8–4.3 in) wide on a short petiole. Adult leaves are mostly arranged alternately, more or less the same shade of yellow-green on both sides, egg-shaped to lance-shaped, 70–235 mm (2.8–9.3 in) long and 13–60 mm (0.51–2.36 in) wide, tapering to a petiole 8–20 mm (0.31–0.79 in) long. The flower buds are perfumed and arranged in leaf axils, appearing as if on a branched peduncle up to 5 mm (0.20 in) long, each branch of the peduncle with three buds on pedicels 2–6 mm (0.079–0.236 in) long. Mature buds are oval to pear-shaped, 6–9 mm (0.24–0.35 in) long and 45–110 mm (1.8–4.3 in) wide with a rounded operculum. Flowering occurs from April to June, or from November to December and the flowers are white or creamy white and perfumed. The fruit is a woody cup-shaped, cylindrical, barrel-shaped or conical capsule 8–12 mm (0.31–0.47 in) long and 8–11 mm (0.31–0.43 in) wide. Seeds are a dull to semi-glossy red or red-brown colour, limpet-shaped or oval.

== Taxonomy and naming ==
Corymbia flavescens was first formally described in 1995 by Ken Hill and Lawrie Johnson from specimens collected in 1925 by William Blakely and published the description in the journal Telopea. Blakely described the specimens as "a garden hybrid", but Hill and Johnson considered that there were "no characters indicating hybridism".

== Distribution and habitat ==
Cabbage ghost gum occurs on red earth soils, often along watercourses. In Western Australia it is found in the Central Kimberley, Dampierland, Great Sandy Desert, Northern Kimberley, Ord Victoria Plain, Pilbara, Tanami and Victoria Bonaparte IBRA bioregions. In the Northern Territory it is found in the Davenport Murchison Ranges, Gulf Fall and Uplands, Mitchell Grass Downs, Mount Isa Inlier and Sturt Plateau IBRA bioregions.

== Response to fire ==
This eucalypt regrows from a lignotuber and epicormic shoots in response to fire. As a result, the tree has a lower than 30% mortality rate even if all of its leaves are scorched during a bushfire.

== See also ==
- List of Corymbia species
