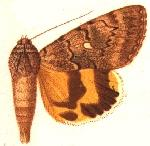

Scientific classification
- Kingdom: Animalia
- Phylum: Arthropoda
- Class: Insecta
- Order: Lepidoptera
- Superfamily: Noctuoidea
- Family: Erebidae
- Genus: Catocala
- Species: C. flavescens

Binomial name
- Catocala flavescens Hampson, 1894

Synonyms
- Ephesia flavescens

= Catocala flavescens =

Species of moth

Catocala flavescens is a moth of the family Erebidae first described by George Hampson in 1894. It is found in India.
