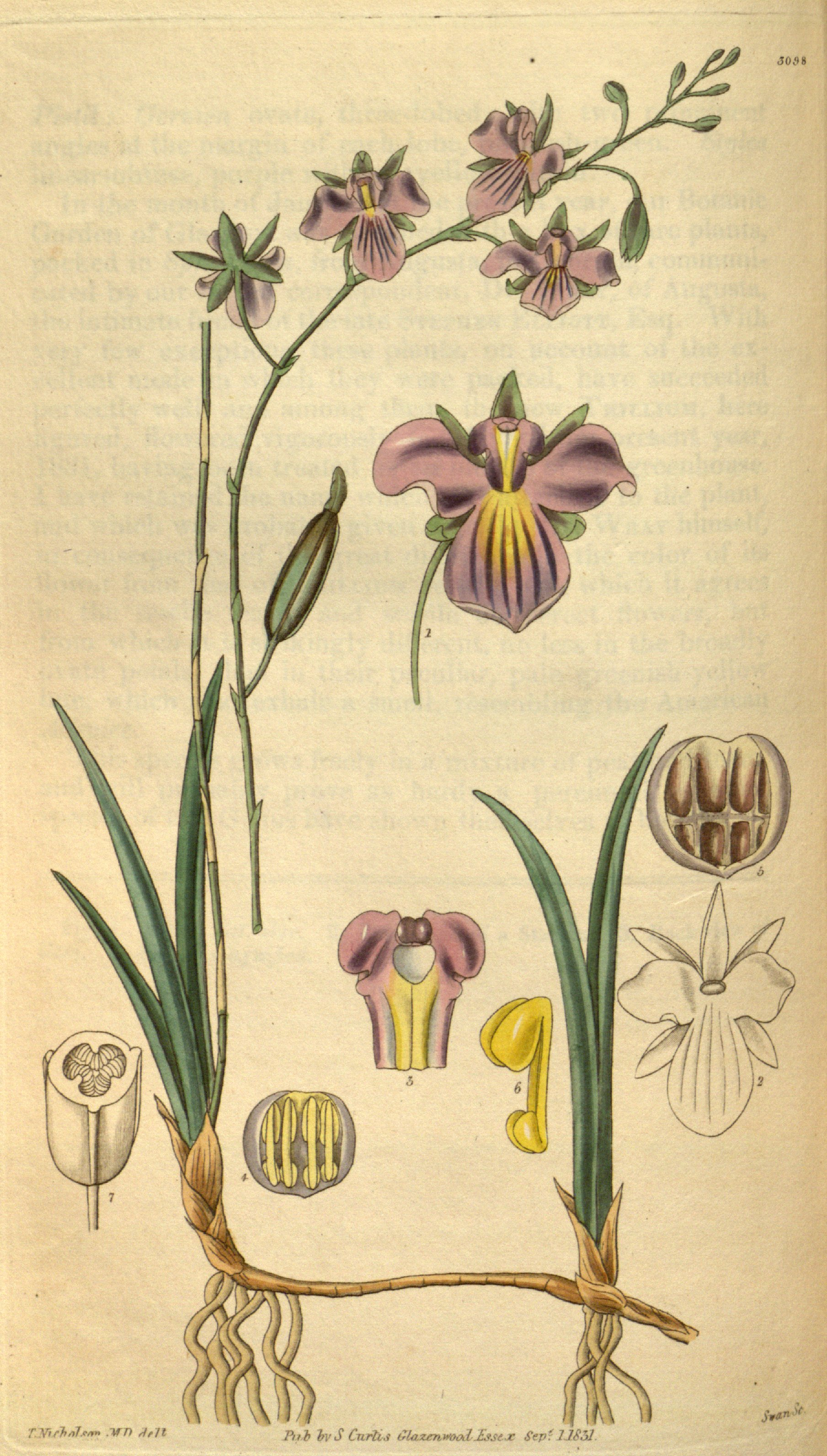
- Tetramicra elegans 1831 illustration

Scientific classification
- Kingdom: Plantae
- Clade: Tracheophytes
- Clade: Angiosperms
- Clade: Monocots
- Order: Asparagales
- Family: Orchidaceae
- Subfamily: Epidendroideae
- Tribe: Epidendreae
- Subtribe: Laeliinae
- Genus: Tetramicra; Lindl.

Type species
- Cymbidium rigidum (syn of Tetramicra canaliculata) Willd.

= Tetramicra (plant) =

Genus of orchids

Tetramicra is a genus of flowering plants in the orchid family, Orchidaceae, native to the West Indies. Tetramicra canaliculata has also been reported from southern Florida, but these reports have been challenged. Tetramicra is abbreviated Ttma. in the horticultural trade.

Most species are terrestrial, (the exception being T. malpighiarum) and lacking pseudobulbs (with the exception of T. bulbosa), with rigid, linear, terete or triquetrous leaves and a terminal inflorescence consisting of a slender few- to several-flowered peduncle. Pollinia eight, 4 larger and four smaller.

== Species ==
Species accepted as of April 2016:

1. Tetramicra bulbosa Mansf. (1926) - Hispaniola, Jamaica
2. Tetramicra canaliculata (Aubl.) Urb. (1918) - Florida (?), Hispaniola, Puerto Rico, Trinidad, Lesser Antilles
3. Tetramicra ekmanii Mansf. (1926) - Cuba, Hispaniola
4. Tetramicra malpighiarum J.A.Hern. & M.A.Díaz (2000) - Cuba
5. Tetramicra parviflora Lindl. ex Griseb. (1864) - Bahamas, Cuba, Hispaniola, Jamaica
6. Tetramicra pratensis (Rchb.f.) Rolfe (1889) - Dominican Republic
7. Tetramicra riparia Vale, Sánchez-Abad & L.Navarro (2012)) - Cuba
8. Tetramicra simplex Ames (1923) - Cuba
9. Tetramicra tenera (A.Rich.) Griseb. ex Benth. (1881) - Cuba
10. Tetramicra zanonii Nir (2000) - Dominican Republic
