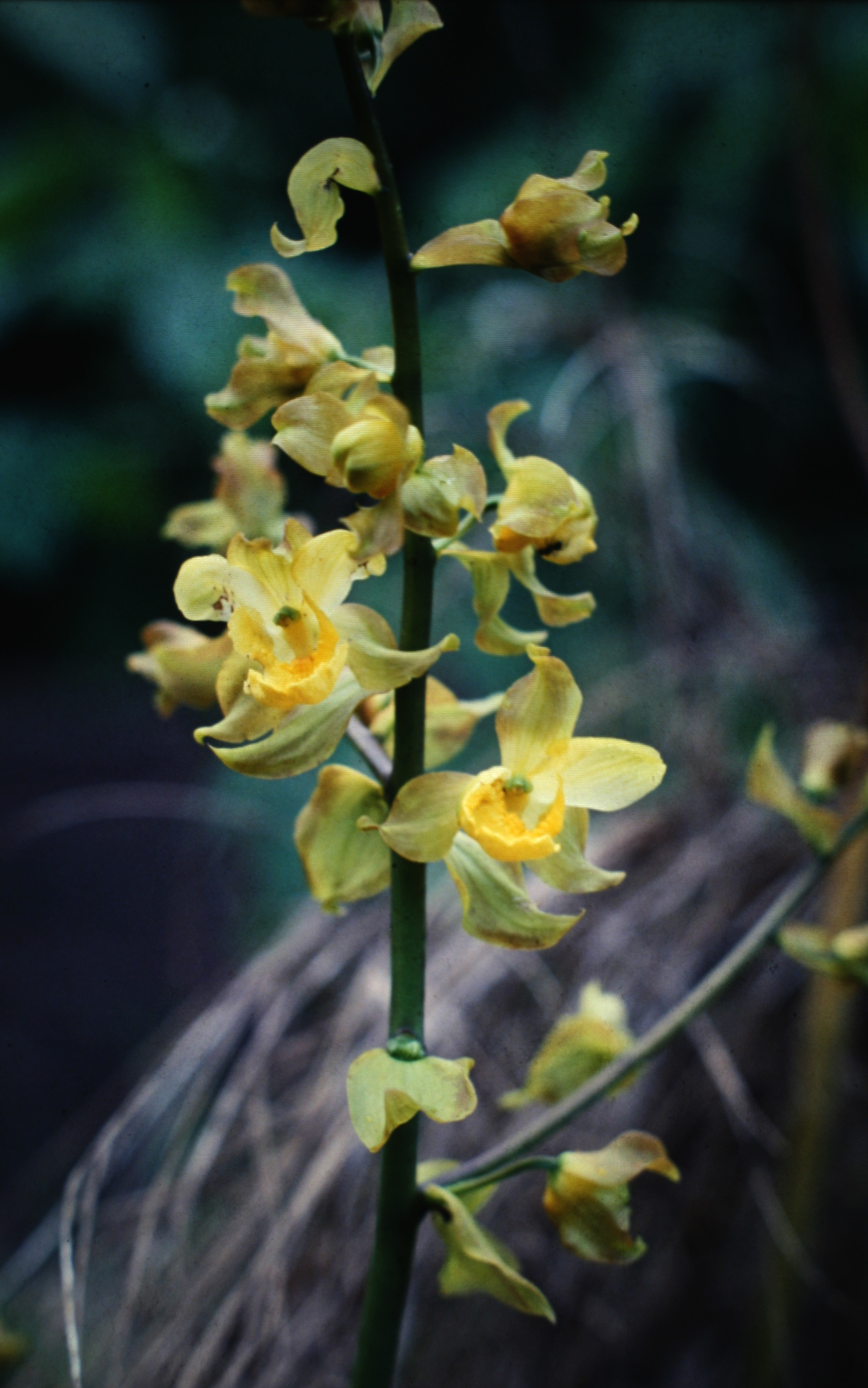

Scientific classification
- Kingdom: Plantae
- Clade: Tracheophytes
- Clade: Angiosperms
- Clade: Monocots
- Order: Asparagales
- Family: Orchidaceae
- Subfamily: Epidendroideae
- Genus: Cyrtopodium
- Species: C. andersonii

Binomial name
- Cyrtopodium andersonii (Lamb. ex Andrews) R.Br.

Synonyms
- Cymbidium andersonii Lamb. ex Andrews (1812) (Basionym); Cyrtopodium flavescens Cogn., J. (1895); Cyrtopodium andersonii var. flavescens (Cogn.) Cogn. (1901); Cyrtopodium roraimense L.C.Menezes (1999)

= Cyrtopodium andersonii =

Species of orchid

Cyrtopodium andersonii is a species of orchid. It is native to South America (Brazil, Venezuela, Colombia and the Guianas). It is the type species of the genus Cyrtopodium.
