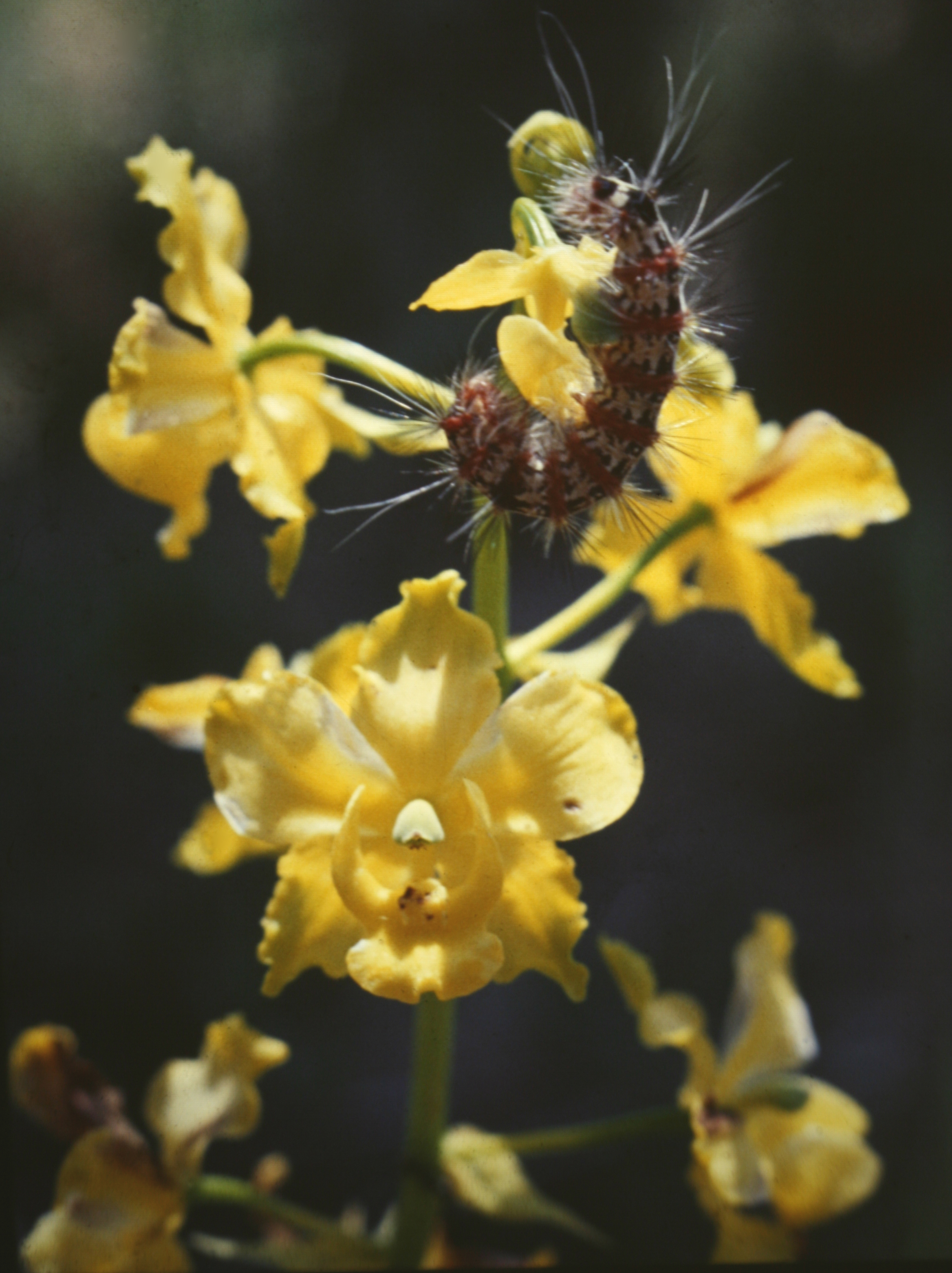
- Cyrtopodium cristatum inflorescence with a caterpillar

Scientific classification
- Kingdom: Plantae
- Clade: Tracheophytes
- Clade: Angiosperms
- Clade: Monocots
- Order: Asparagales
- Family: Orchidaceae
- Subfamily: Epidendroideae
- Tribe: Cymbidieae
- Subtribe: Cyrtopodiinae; Benth.
- Genus: Cyrtopodium; R.Br.

Type species
- Cyrtopodium andersonii (Lamb. ex Andrews) R. Br.

Synonyms
- Tylochilus Nees

= Cyrtopodium =

Genus of orchids

Cyrtopodium, often abbreviated Cyrt in horticulture, is a genus of more than 40 species of epiphytic and terrestrial orchids found from Florida and Mexico through Argentina. Cyrtopodium is the only genus in the monotypic subtribe Cyrtopodiinae.

The type species is C. andersonii, originally described in 1812 by A.B. Lambert as Cymbidium andersonii, and in 1813 used by Robert Brown to erect his new genus Cyrtopodium.

== List of species ==
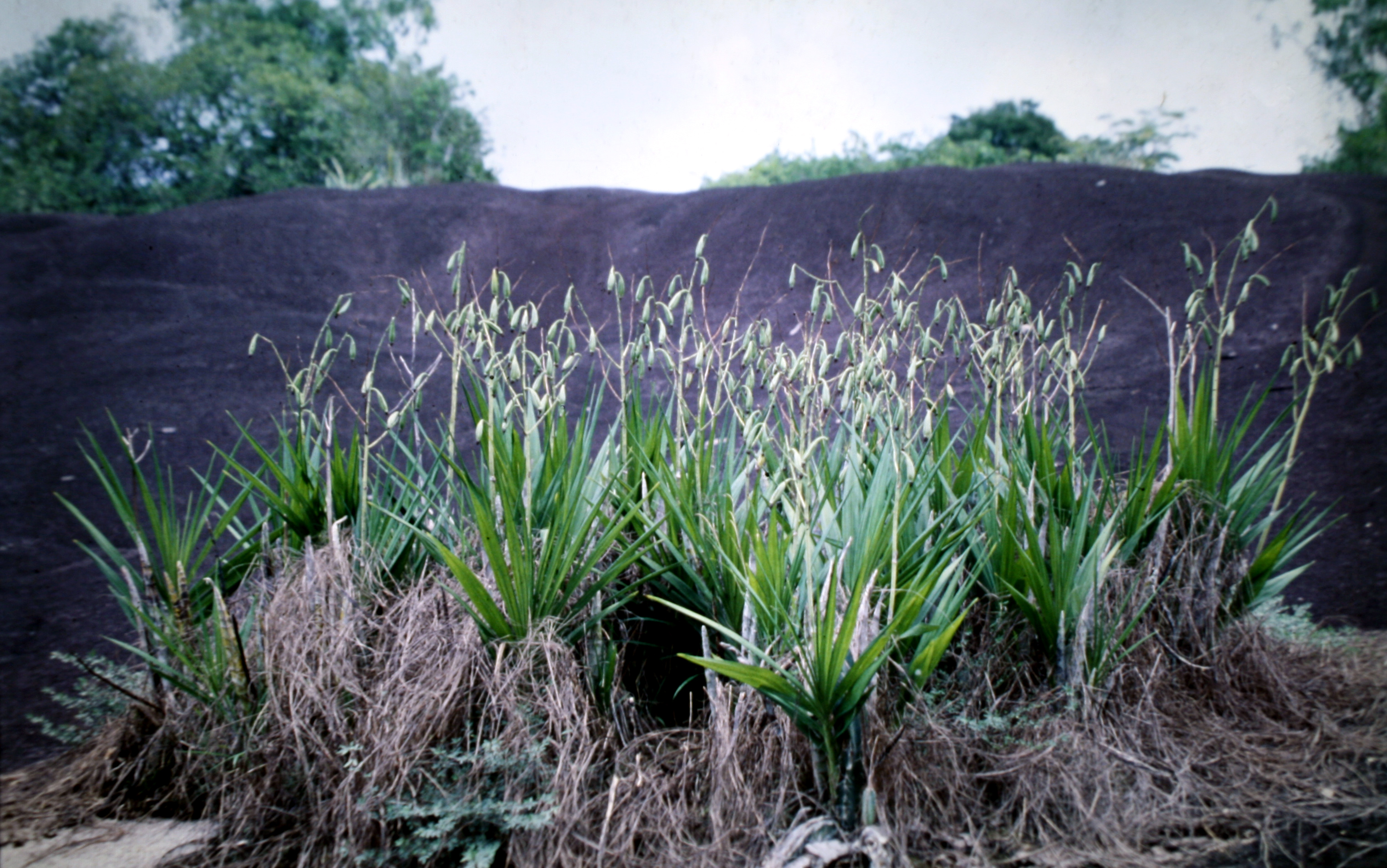
Fruiting stand of Cyrtopodium andersonii

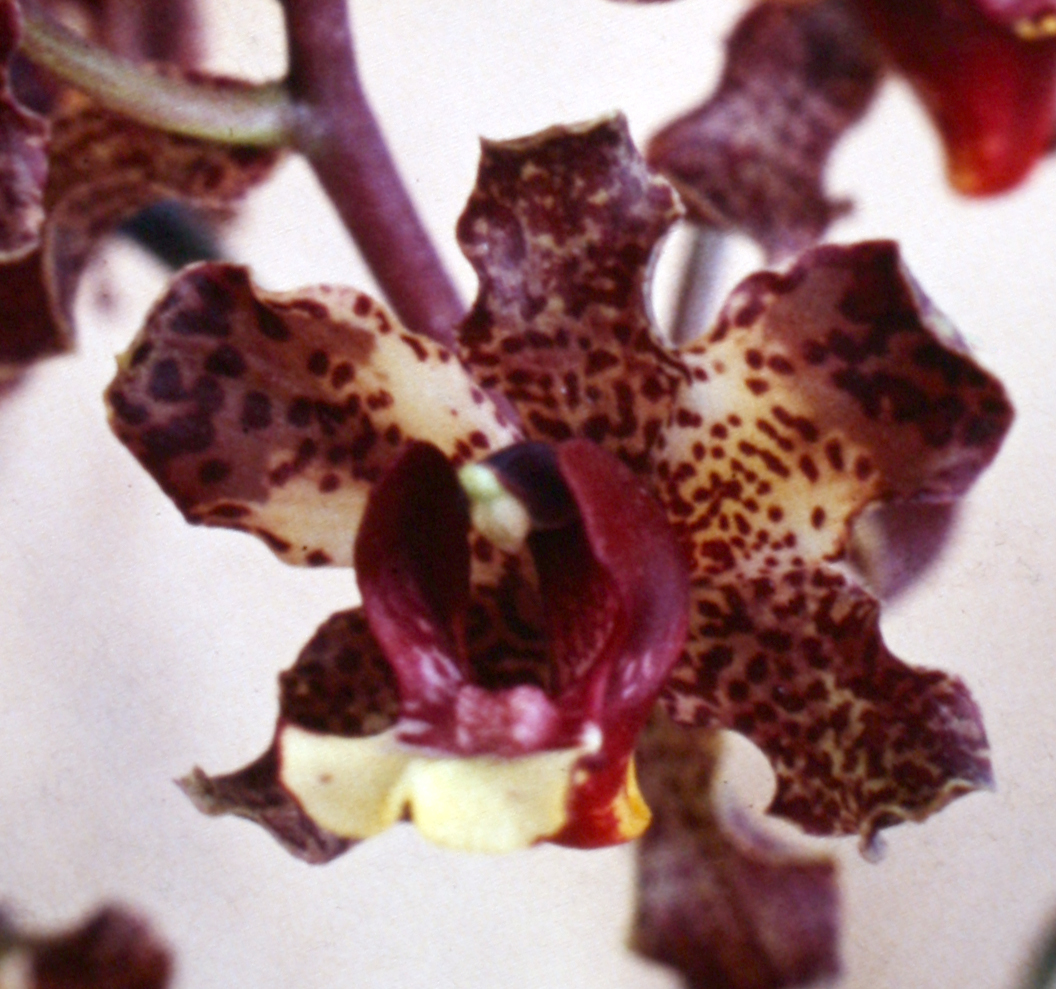
Cyrtopodium parviflorum flower

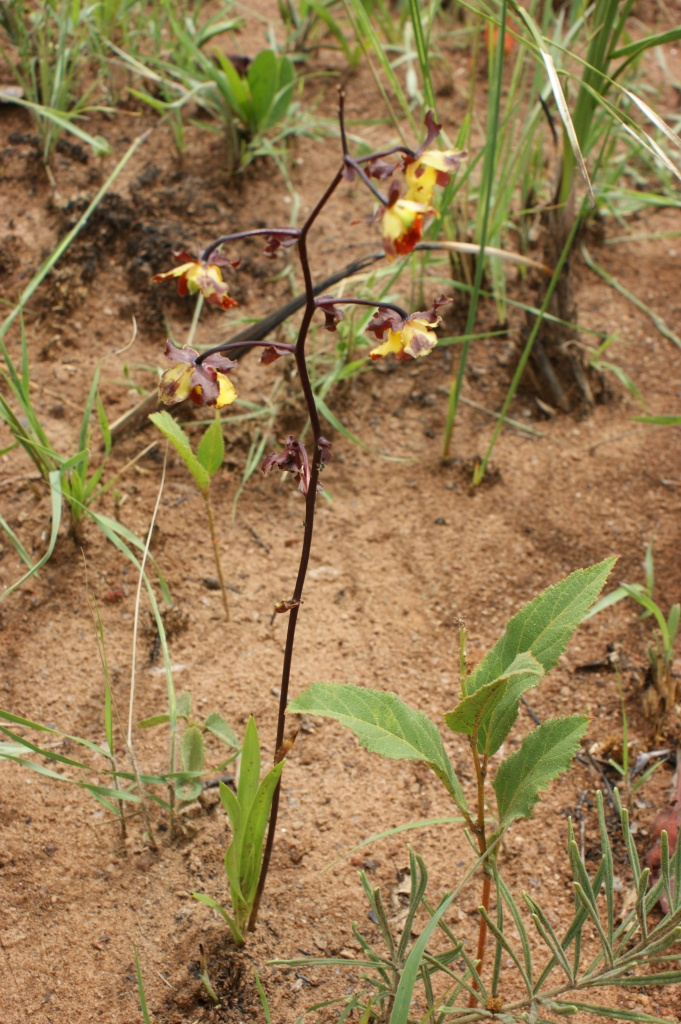
Cyrtopodium brunneum

1. Cyrtopodium aliciae L.Linden & Rolfe
2. Cyrtopodium andersonii (Lamb. ex Andrews) R.Br. in W.T.Aiton
3. Cyrtopodium blanchetii Rchb.f.
4. Cyrtopodium braemii L.C.Menezes
5. Cyrtopodium brandonianum Barb.Rodr.
6. Cyrtopodium brunneum J.A.N.Bat. & Bianch.
7. Cyrtopodium cachimboense L.C.Menezes
8. Cyrtopodium caiapoense L.C.Menezes
9. Cyrtopodium cipoense L.C.Menezes
10. Cyrtopodium confusum L.C.Menezes, 2008
11. Cyrtopodium cristatum Lindl.
12. Cyrtopodium dusenii Schltr.
13. Cyrtopodium eugenii Rchb.f. & Warm. in H.G.Reichenbach
14. Cyrtopodium flavum (Nees) Link & Otto ex Rchb.
15. Cyrtopodium fowliei L.C.Menezes
16. Cyrtopodium gigas (Vell.) Hoehne
17. Cyrtopodium glutiniferum Raddi
18. Cyrtopodium graniticum G.A.Romero & Carnevali
19. Cyrtopodium hatschbachii Pabst
20. Cyrtopodium holstii L.C.Menezes
21. Cyrtopodium × intermedium Brade (C. gigas × C. glutiniferum)
22. Cyrtopodium josephense Barb.Rodr.
23. Cyrtopodium kleinii J.A.N.Bat. & Bianch.
24. Cyrtopodium lamellaticallosum J.A.N.Bat. & Bianch.
25. Cyrtopodium latifolium Bianch. & J.A.N.Bat.
26. Cyrtopodium linearifolium J.A.N.Bat. & Bianch.
27. Cyrtopodium lissochiloides Hoehne & Schltr.
28. Cyrtopodium longibulbosum Dodson & G.A.Romero
29. Cyrtopodium macedoi J.A.N.Bat. & Bianch.
30. Cyrtopodium macrobulbon (Lex.) G.A.Romero & Carnevali
31. Cyrtopodium minutum L.C.Menezes
32. Cyrtopodium naiguatae Schltr.
33. Cyrtopodium pallidum Rchb.f. & Warm. in H.G.Reichenbach
34. Cyrtopodium palmifrons Rchb.f. & Warm. in H.G.Reichenbach
35. Cyrtopodium paludicola Hoehne
36. Cyrtopodium paniculatum (Ruiz & Pav.) Garay
37. Cyrtopodium parviflorum Lindl.
38. Cyrtopodium pflanzii Schltr.
39. Cyrtopodium poecilum Rchb.f. & Warm. in H.G.Reichenbach
40. Cyrtopodium punctatum (L.) Lindl.
41. Cyrtopodium saintlegerianum Rchb.f.
42. Cyrtopodium schargellii G.A.Romero, Aymard & Carnevali
43. Cyrtopodium triste Rchb.f. & Warm. in H.G.Reichenbach
44. Cyrtopodium vernum Rchb.f. & Warm. in H.G.Reichenbach
45. Cyrtopodium virescens Rchb.f. & Warm. in H.G.Reichenbach
46. Cyrtopodium willmorei Knowles & Westc.
47. Cyrtopodium witeckii L.C.Menezes, 2009
48. Cyrtopodium withneri L.C.Menezes

Names brought to synonymy

- Cyrtopodium elegans, a synonym for Tetramicra canaliculata

== Uses ==
In San Pablito, Puebla, Mexico, local Otomi artisans use an adhesive isolated from the orchid Cyrtopodium macrobulbon to patch holes in the amate paper they make. When amate is peeled off of its drying board, some portions remain adhered, resulting in holes and other defects on the sheet. Pseudobulbs of C. macrobulbon are cut, and the injured end is rubbed on a patch (also made of amate) and around the perimeter of the hole. The patch is placed over the hole and hammered into place to ensure adhesion.
