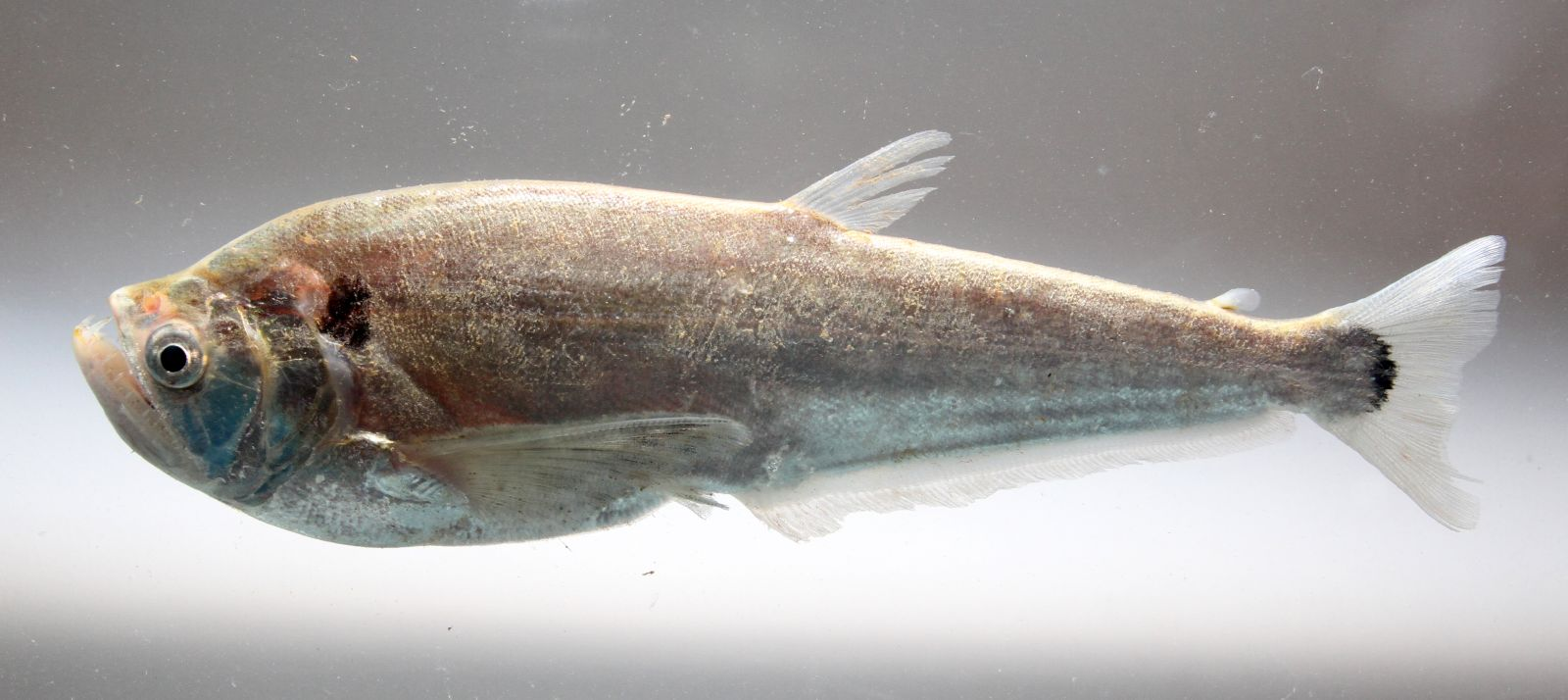

Conservation status
- Least Concern (IUCN 3.1)

Scientific classification
- Kingdom: Animalia
- Phylum: Chordata
- Class: Actinopterygii
- Division: Teleostei
- Order: Characiformes
- Family: Cynodontidae
- Genus: Cynodon
- Species: C. gibbus

Binomial name
- Cynodon gibbus (Agassiz, 1829)

Synonyms
- Rhaphiodon gibbus Agassiz, 1829

= Cynodon gibbus =

Species of fish

Cynodon gibbus, known as the dogtooth characin, snub-nosed payara, and Agassiz's payara, is a species of freshwater fish in the Cynodontidae family of the order Characiformes. It is a piscivore (fish eater) that occurs in rivers, lakes, and lagoons throughout much of northern South America, including the Amazon River basin. The species is fished by subsistence fishermen, commercial fishermen, and sport fishermen. Mostly silver-gray with a spot behind the gill opening and another at the caudal fin, it has long, sharp teeth and reaches a maximum of 32.2 centimetres (12.7 in) in standard length and 487.66 grams (1.08 lb). The species is abundant in its range. First described by Louis Agassiz in 1829, it is one of three species in the genus Cynodon, alongside C. septenarius and C. meionactis.

== Taxonomy and etymology ==
Cynodon gibbus was first described by Louis Agassiz in 1829 under the basionym (original scientific name) Rhaphiodon gibbus. It is classified in the Cynodontidae family (the dogtooth characins) in the order Characiformes. It is also known by the common names dogtooth characin, snub-nosed payara, and Agassiz's payara. In Spanish, it is known by the common names chambira and perro, and its Portuguese common names include aicanga, peixe-cachorro, peixe-ripa, and zé-do-ó.

The type specimen is MZUSP 6539, a neotype (a replacement for a lost or damaged holotype) measuring 146.0 millimetres (5.75 in) in standard length collected from Lago Manacapuru in Amazonas, Brazil. The holotype (original type specimen) is lost; it may have been among a number of biological specimens housed at the Zoologische Staatssammlung München in Germany and destroyed in 1944 during a World War II bombing raid.

This fish is the largest of the three species in the genus Cynodon, all of which are found in South America. The genus name Cynodon comes from the Greek kyon, meaning "dog", and odous, meaning "tooth", which refers to the long canine-like teeth found in the members of the genus. The specific name gibbus is the Latin word for "humped", referring to the shape of the fish's ventral, or belly, side.

The genus name is attributed to Johann Baptist von Spix, who had been studying and collecting samples of the freshwater fish of Brazil until his death in 1826. Agassiz placed C. gibbus in the genus Rhaphiodon instead of Spix's suggestion Cynodon because the name Cynodon had already been used for a plant genus. Georges Cuvier also introduced the name Cynodon in 1829, but conflated C. gibbus with Hydrocyon scomberoides. A 2002 decision by the International Code of Zoological Nomenclature (ICZN) placed C. gibbus as the type species of Cynodon and Rhaphiodon vulpinus as the type species of Rhaphiodon, and additionally suppressed uses of Cynodon before that of Spix and Agassiz, including Cuvier's.

== Distribution and habitat ==
C. gibbus occurs in the Amazon, Tocantins-Araguaia, and Orinoco river basins of Bolivia, Brazil, Colombia, Ecuador, Guyana, Peru, Suriname, and Venezuela. It is also found in Guyana's coastal river drainages. It is a pelagic fish (living away from the shore and near the water surface) that prefers clear water in lakes, rivers, streams, and lagoons. It is tolerant of brackish water. The fish has an estimated extent of occurrence of 8,144,567 km^{2} (3,144,635 mi^{2}). It is migratory, traveling from 500 kilometres (310 mi) to 1,500 km (930 mi), though as its reproduction has not been extensively studied, its spawning area remains unknown.

== Description ==
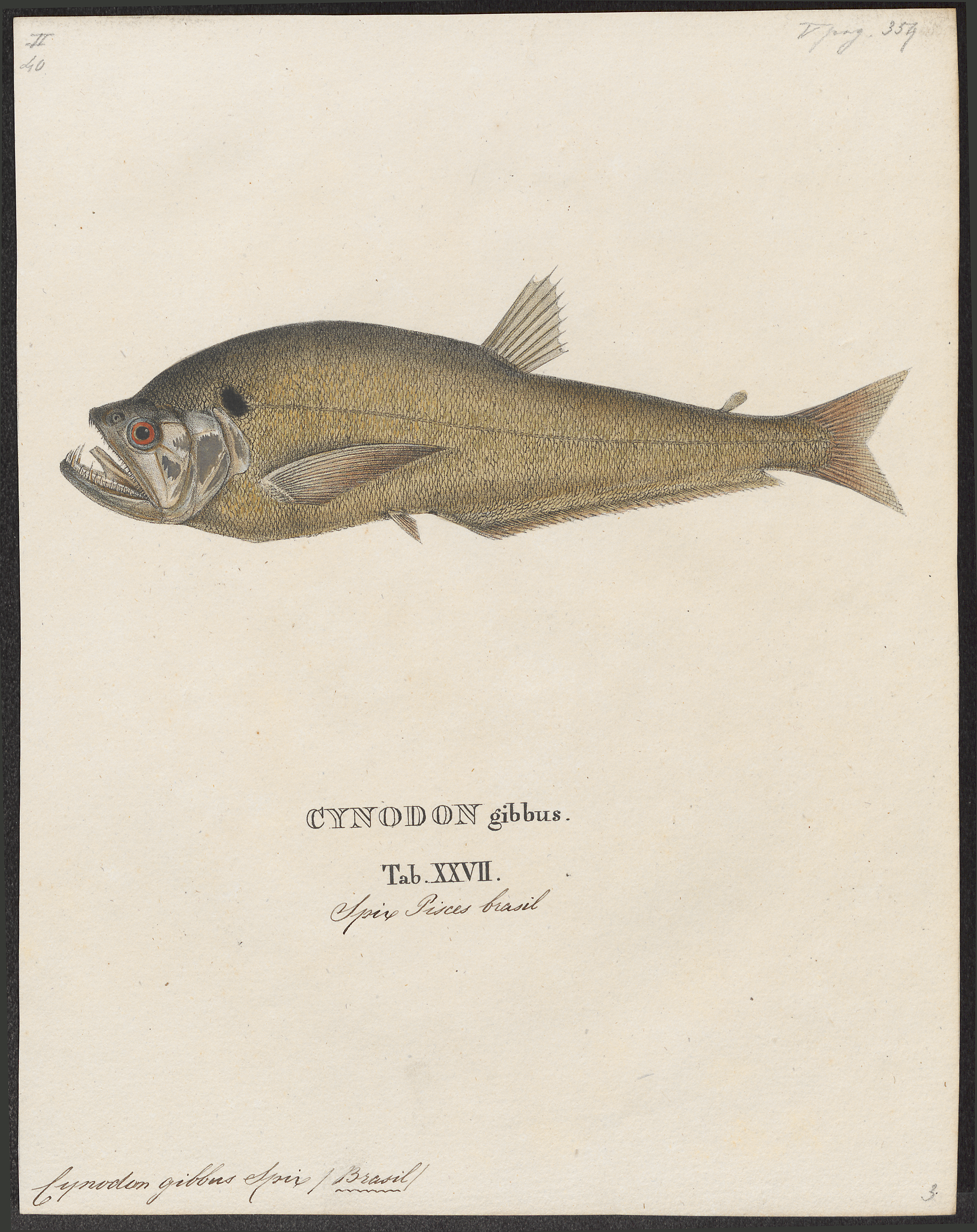
Cynodon gibbus print from Iconographia Zoologica

This species grows up to 32.2 cm (12.7 in) in standard length and a weight of 487.66 g (1.08 lb). It has a short, deep body with smooth, cycloid scales. It is silver-gray in color with a dark spot behind the gill opening, and a second spot at the base of the caudal fin. The dorsal fin is parallel to the beginning of the anal fin. The long anal fin is characteristic of the Cynodon genus (with at least 60 rays in all members of the genus), in comparison to the other Cynodontidae family members, Rhaphiodon and Hydrolycus, which have fewer than 50. The adipose fin is transparent. Its mouth is facing upwards; in side view and when closed, it forms an angle greater than 80°. It has long, sharp, canine-like teeth.

When differentiating C. gibbus from the other members of its genus, it can be contrasted with Cynodon septenarius by its eight pelvic fin rays, whereas C. septenarnius has seven; additionally, C. septenarius lacks a spot on the caudal fin. The orbital diameter is slightly smaller than that of Cynodon meionactis (average of 29.2% versus 31.8% of the head length, and even larger in C. septenarnius), and while G. gibbus rarely has fewer than 68 anal fin rays, C. meionactis never has more than 67.

C. gibbus has 54 pairs of chromosomes. In contrast with many other animals such as mammals, where females have XX sex chromosomes and males have XY sex chromosomes, C. gibbus is one of several fishes that is observed to follow the ZW sex-determination system, in which males have ZZ sex chromosomes and females have ZW sex chromosomes. The W chromosome contains sequences of repeated DNA, and while these sequences are believed to play a role in chromosomal differentiation, their precise function is unknown.

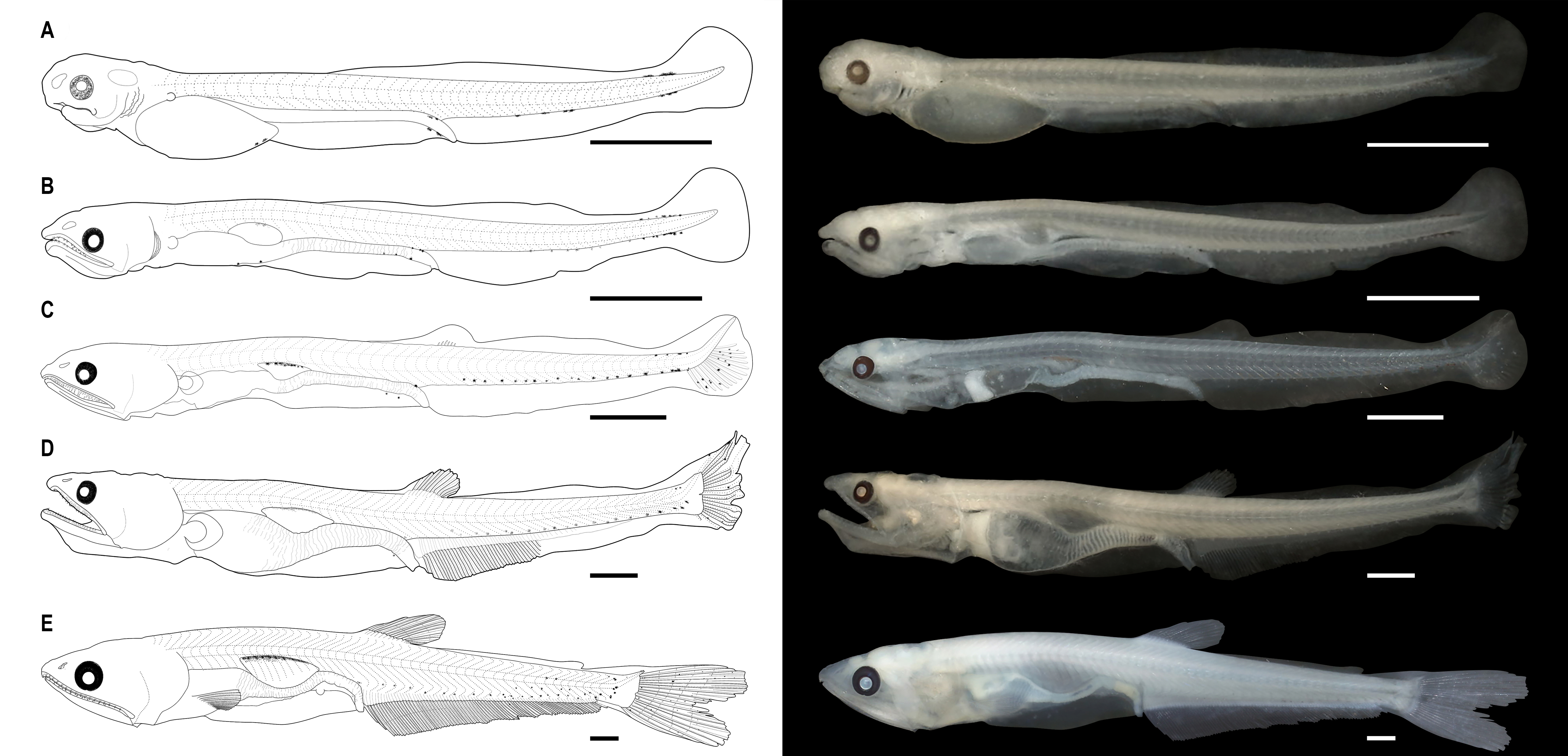
Larval stages of Cynodon gibbus: yolk-sac, preflexion, early flexion, late flexion, and postflexion. Scale bars under the tail are 1 mm.

Like other members of the Cynodontidae family, larvae of C. gibbus are elongate, with small eyes and a wide mouth containing conical teeth. The larvae are distinguishable from others of similar species by the shape of the swim bladder (oval in early stages, and triangular in later stages), the number of the myomeres (blocks of muscle) around the anus, and the presence of pigments around the rectum and caudal peduncle (the part of the tail before the caudal fin begins). The position of the dorsal fin over the anal fin, as well as the pectoral fin's length stopping short of the beginning of the swim bladder, are further identifying characteristics.

== Biology and ecology ==
This species is a predator whose diet is primarily composed of other fish. It also occasionally feeds on invertebrates. In its larval form, the fish consumes zooplankton, including cladocerans and copepods. The species does not exhibit parental care.

The range of C. gibbus and its congener (other member of its genus) C. septenarius is sympatric (overlapping). Both species are found alongside one another in the Amazon tributary Uatumã River. The two species are also found in the Branco River and the Trombetas River drainage, but have not been observed inhabiting the same localities. They do not occur with C. meionactis, which appears endemic to the Maroni River of French Guiana.

== Conservation ==
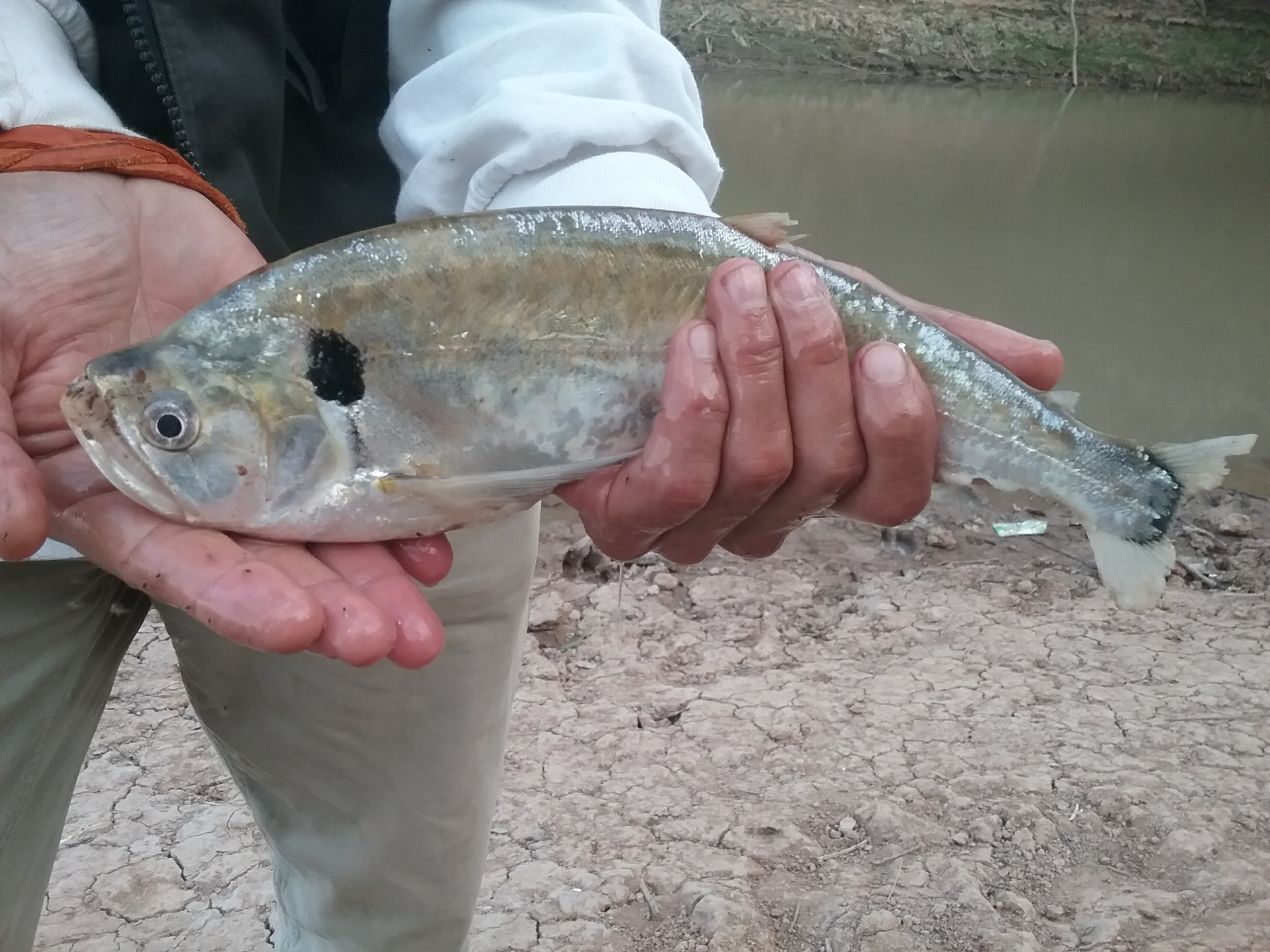
Cynodon gibbus in Bolivia

C. gibbus is assessed as a least concern species on the IUCN Red List. It is abundant in its range and has few identified threats. The species is a target of subsistence fishing, commercial fishing, and sport fishing, and the fish's long, sharp teeth make their heads of interest to artisans.
