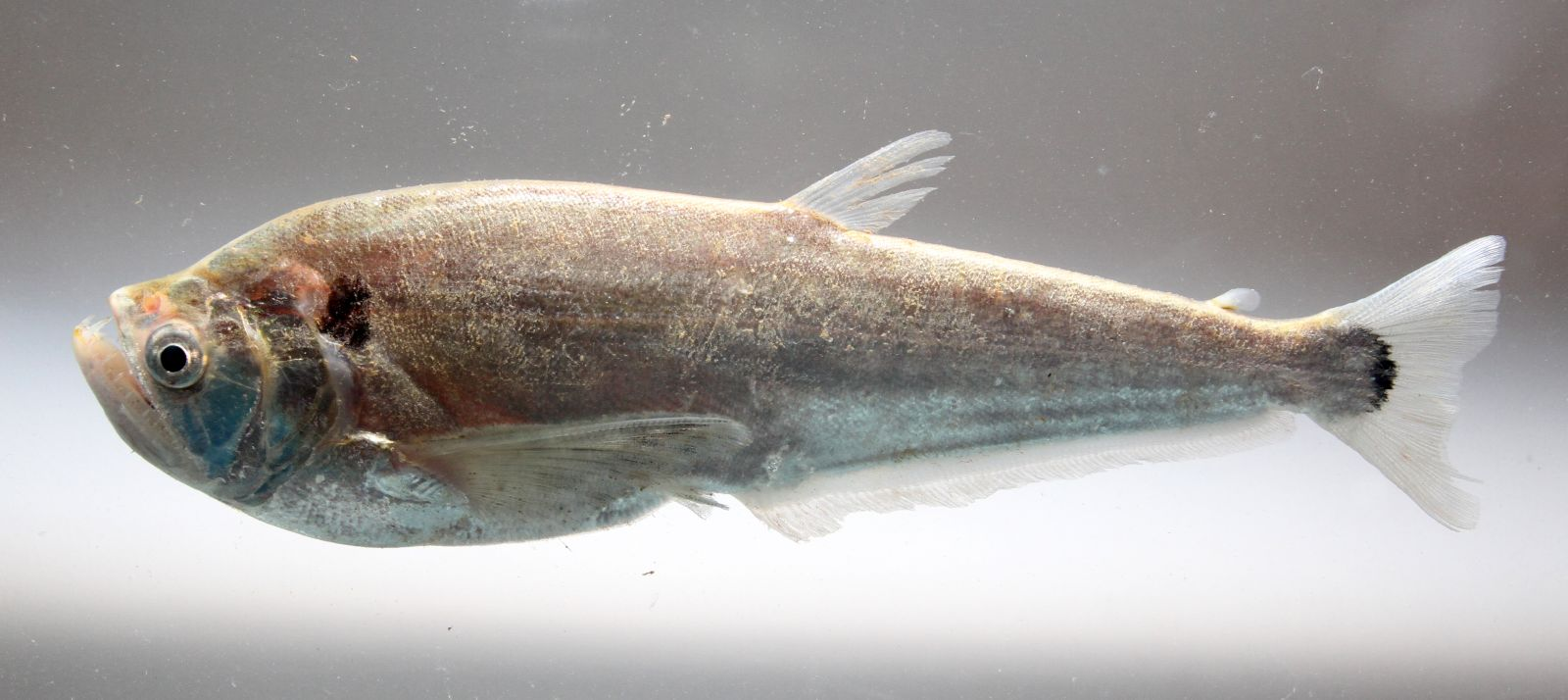
- Cynodon gibbus

Scientific classification
- Kingdom: Animalia
- Phylum: Chordata
- Class: Actinopterygii
- Order: Characiformes
- Family: Cynodontidae
- Genus: Cynodon (Spix, 1829)

Type species
- Cynodon gibbus Spix & Agassiz, 1829

Synonyms
- Cynodon Cuvier, 1829; Camposichthys Travassos, 1946

= Cynodon (fish) =

Genus of fishes

Cynodon, is a genus of freshwater ray-finned fishes belonging to the family Cynodontidae, the dogtooth characins. These piscivorous fishes are found in tropical South America.

== Taxonomy ==
Cynodon was first proposed as genus in 1829 by the French zoologist Georges Cuvier with its only species being Hydrocynus scomberoides, this name was also proposed by Johann Baptist von Spix in 1829 with Cynodon gibbus given as the only species. Cuviers's name is technically a senior synonym of Hydrolycus but the name was suppressed in the IUCN Opinion 2012. Cynodon gibbus was first formally described as Raphiodon gibbus by Spix and Louis Agassiz in 1829 with its type locality given as Lago Manacapuru in the Amazonas State, Brazil. However, in the plate preceding the description in Selecta genera et species piscium : quos in itinere per Brasiliam annis MDCCCXVII-MDCCCXX jussu et auspiciis Maximiliani Josephi I it was named as Cynodon gibbus and the IUCN Opinion 2012 confirmed that this was the valid name for this taxon. This taxon is the type genus of the family Cynodontidae which was named by Carl H. Eigenmann in 1903. This family Cynodontidae belongs to the suborder Characoidei of the order Characiformes.

== Species ==
Cynodon has the following valid species classified within it:

- Cynodon gibbus (Spix & Agassiz, 1829)
- Cynodon meionactis Géry, Le Bail & Keith, 1999
- Cynodon septenarius Toledo-Piza, 2000

== Etymology ==
Cynodon places the Greek kynos, meaning "dog", in its genitive case as kyon, with odon, meaning "tooth". This is a reference to the pair of robust canine-like teeth poseessed by these fishes.

== Characteristics ==
Cynodon is told apart from the other two genera in its family by the possession of a comparatively long anal fin with an fin ray count of at least 60 brached rays, the other two genera have less than 50. The orihgin of the anal fin is located isat the centre of the body while in the other two genera it is towards the rear of the body. The species in this genus are of similsr sized, all having maximum lengths of around 30 to 32 cm (12 to 13 in).

== Distribution ==
Cyonodon dogtooth tetras are found in northern South America in the coastal rivers of the Guianas and in the drainage basins of the Amazon and Orinoco, in Bolivia, Brazil, Colombia, Ecuador, French Guiana, Guyana, Peru, Suriname and Venezuela.
