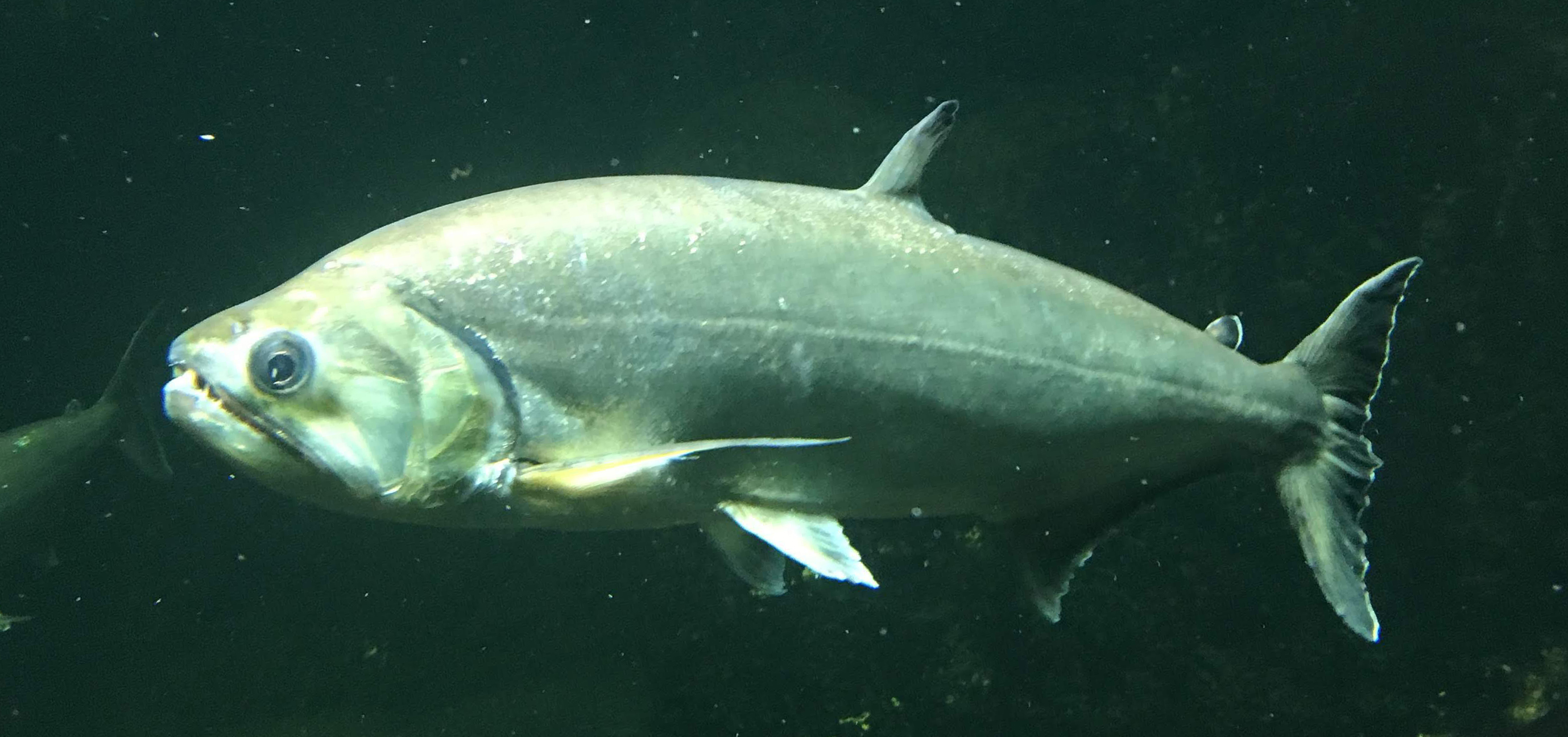
- Adult in Berlin Aquarium, Germany

Conservation status
- Least Concern (IUCN 3.1)

Scientific classification
- Kingdom: Animalia
- Phylum: Chordata
- Class: Actinopterygii
- Division: Teleostei
- Order: Characiformes
- Family: Cynodontidae
- Genus: Hydrolycus
- Species: H. armatus

Binomial name
- Hydrolycus armatus (Jardine, 1841)

Synonyms
- Hydrocyon armuatus Jardine, 1841

= Hydrolycus armatus =

Species of fish

Hydrolycus armatus is a species of dogtooth characin found in freshwater of tropical South America. It is sometimes known as the black-tailed payara, payara, silver payara, or harm, a name it shares with the related H. scomberoides and H. tatauaia.

This predatory fish occasionally makes its way into the aquarium trade, but it requires a very large tank. In its native range it is considered a major gamefish.

== Distribution and habitat ==
This species of fish is found in the Amazon, Orinoco, and Essequibo basins in tropical South America. They are found in several different freshwater habitats, but often in fast-flowing water. They are typically found in deeper waters during the day. The species is locally common; in a major study of a Venezuelan floodplain river, 1/3 of the collected fish were H. armatus, and the species was particularly common in creeks and lagoons. At least some populations are migratory.

== Description ==
Hydrolycus armatus is overall silvery. In adults, the base of the tail and anal fin are pale yellowish, and the distal part is blackish, contrasting with a narrow white edge at the very tip (unique among Hydrolycus species).

A typically reported maximum total length of this fish is 89 cm (2 ft 11 in), but records show specimens up to 95 cm (3 ft 1 in) in Venezuela and more than 100 cm (3.3 ft) in Brazil. It typically weighs up to 8.5 kg (18 lb 12 oz), but can reach almost 18 kg (40 lb). It has frequently been confused with the generally smaller H. scomberoides. H. armatus reaches maturity when at least 30 cm (1 ft) long. Like other dogtooth characins, it has very long pointed canine teeth. In H. armatus these can surpass 10 cm (4 in) in length in large individuals. These are used for spearing their prey, usually other fish.

== Gallery ==
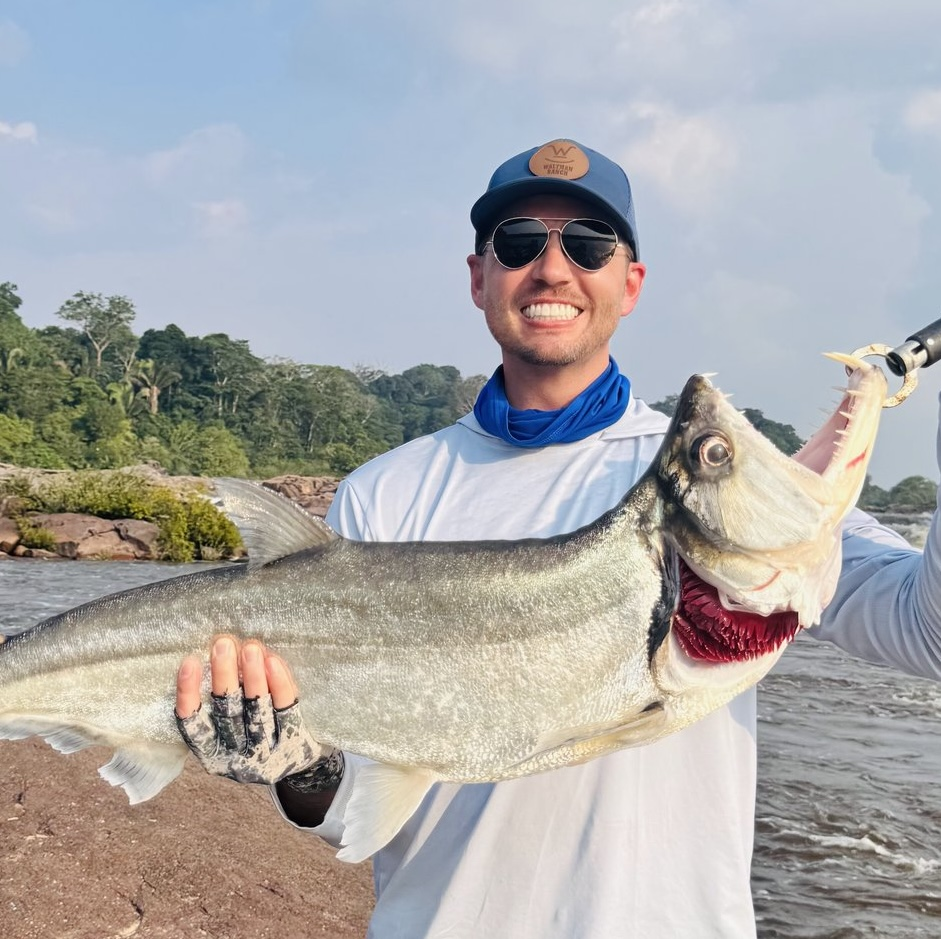
Silver payara from the Rio Aripuanã

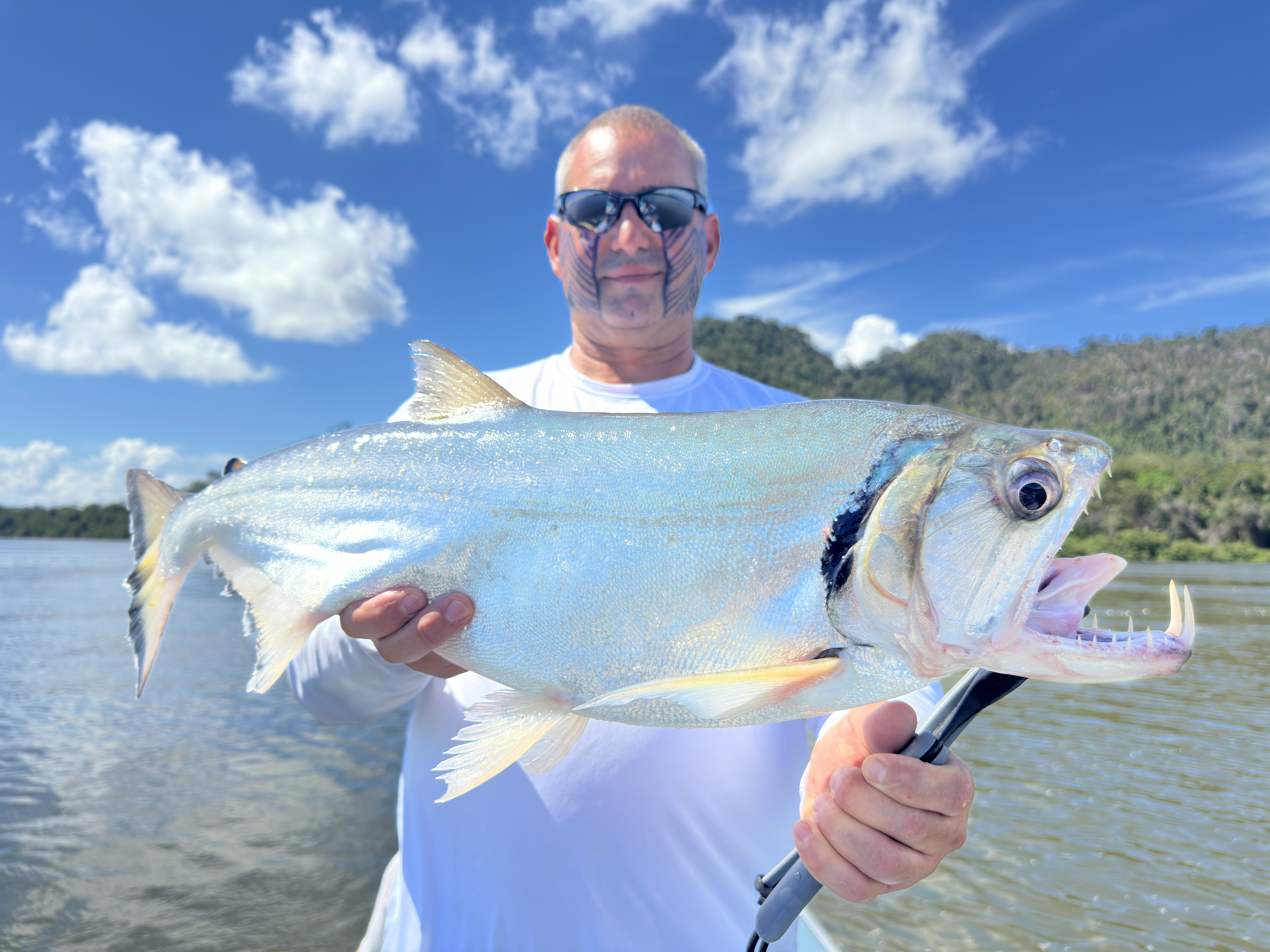
Hydrolycus armatus from the Rio Xingu

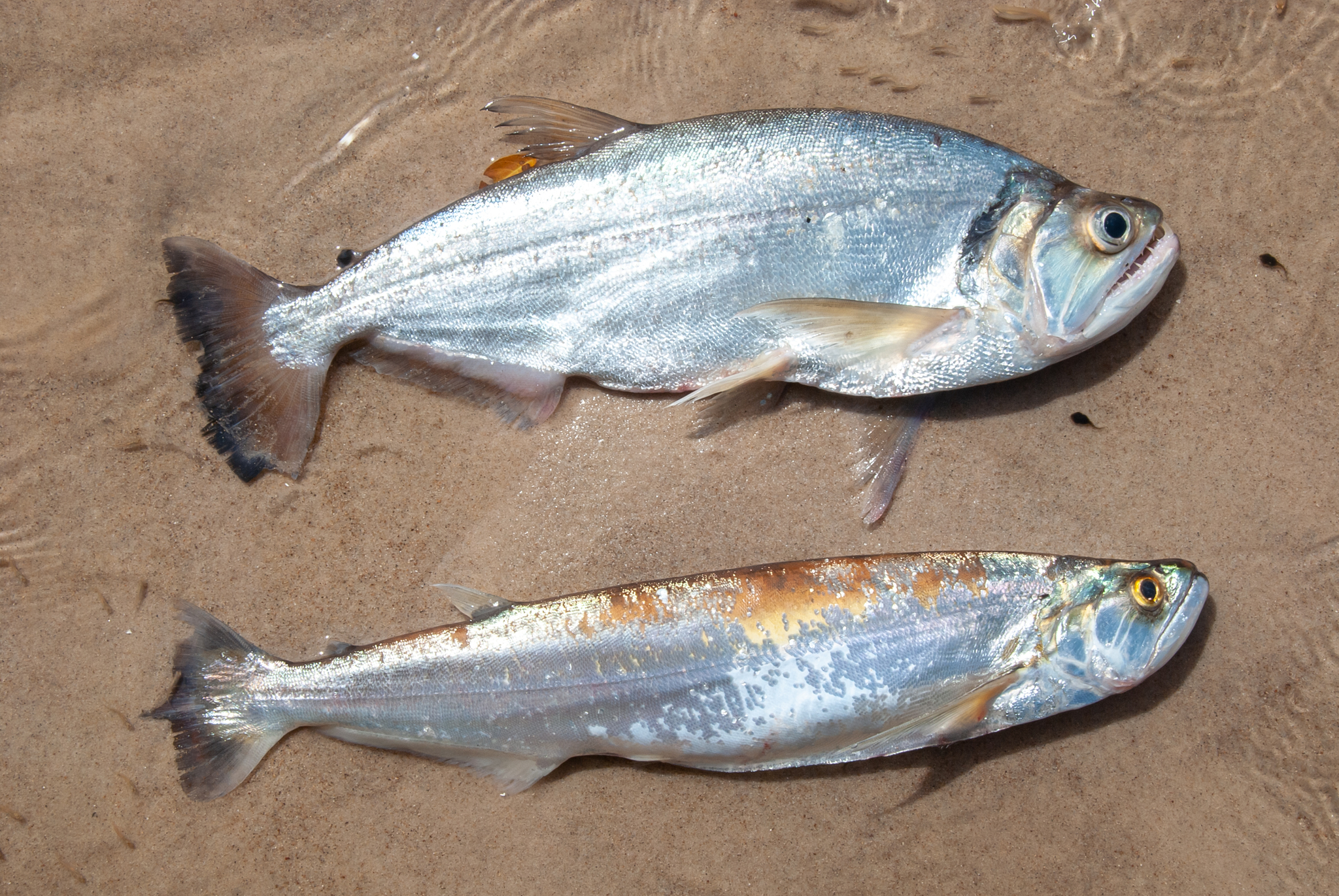
Hydrolycus armatus (top), Rhaphiodon vulpinus (bottom)

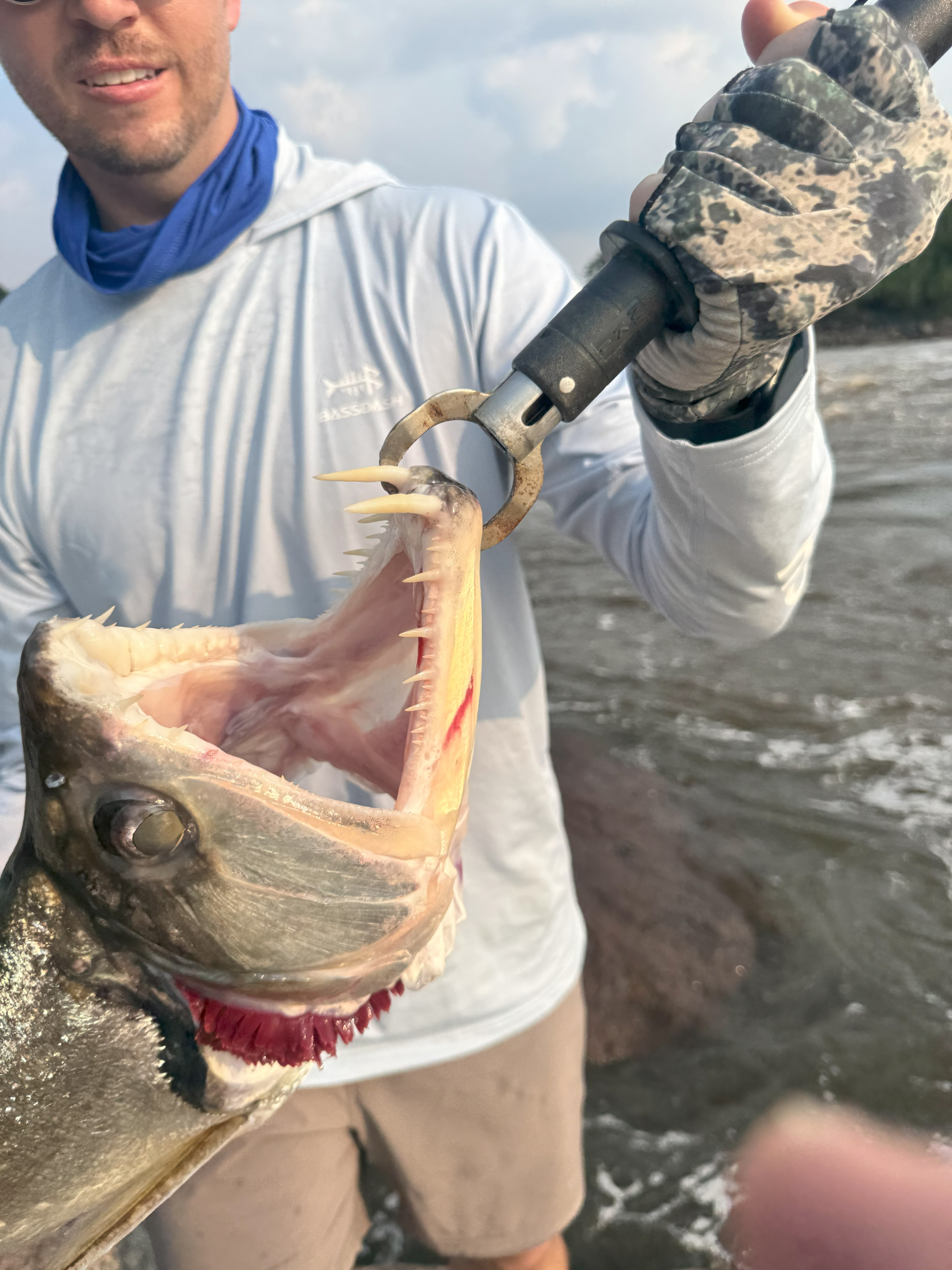
Fangs of the Hydrolycus armatus

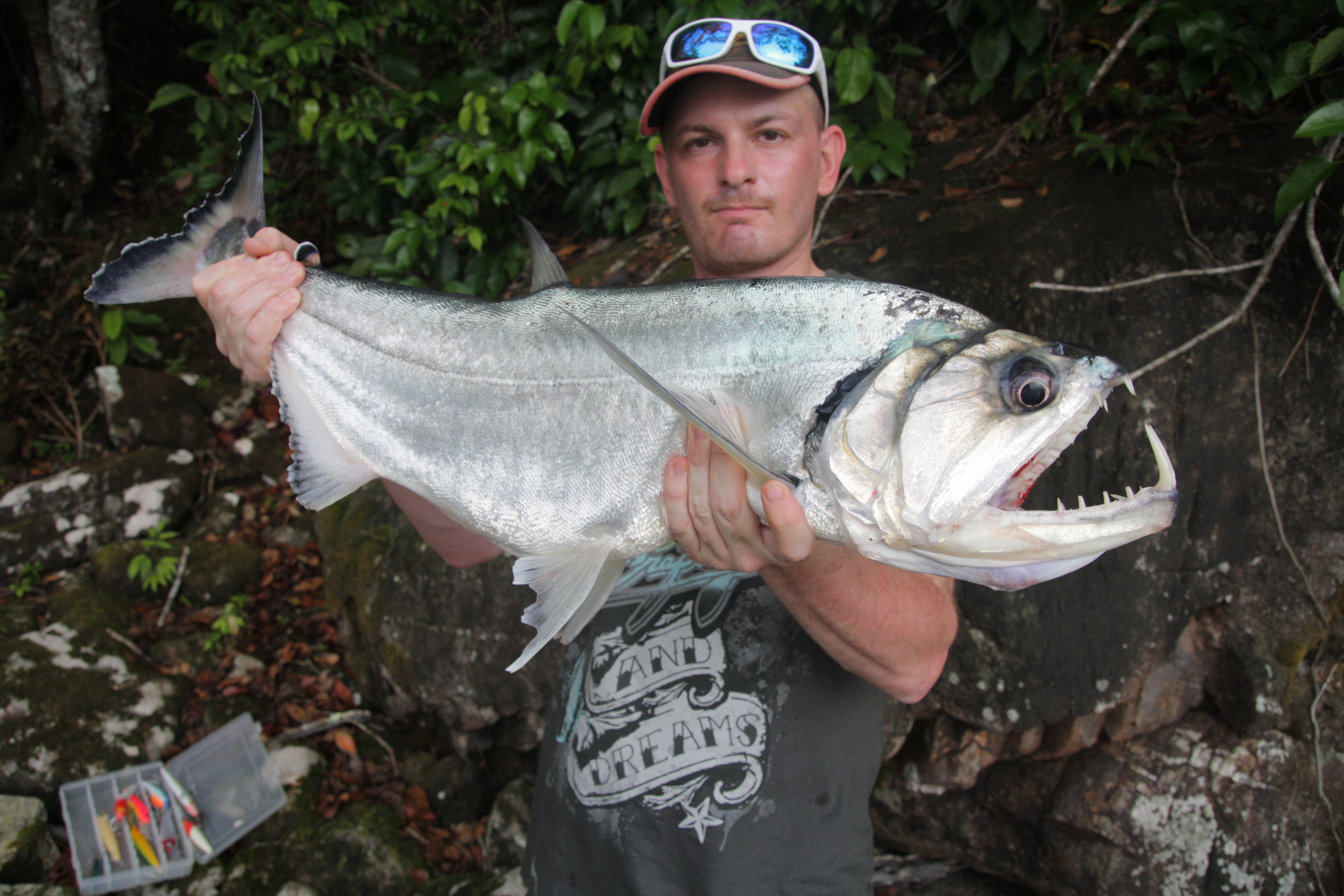
Close-up of Hydrolycus armatus from Uraima Falls, Venezuela, showing its prominent canine teeth
