= Cynodon meionactis =

Conservation status
- Least Concern (IUCN 3.1)

Scientific classification
- Kingdom: Animalia
- Phylum: Chordata
- Class: Actinopterygii
- Order: Characiformes
- Family: Cynodontidae
- Genus: Cynodon
- Species: C. meionactis

Binomial name
- Cynodon meionactis Géry, Le Bail, and Keith, 1999

Species of fish

Cynodon meionactis, known as the blackear payara and vampire fish, is a species of freshwater fish in the Cynodontidae family of the order Characiformes. It is found in South America, in the rivers of French Guiana and Suriname. The fish can grow to a maximum size of 30 centimetres (12 in) in total length.

== Taxonomy and etymology ==
Cynodon meionactis was first described by Jacques Géry, Pierre-Yves Le Bail, and Philippe Keith in 1999. It is classified in the Cynodontidae family (the dogtooth characins) in the order Characiformes. It is known by the common names blackear payara and vampire fish. In French, it is known as Cynodon à petites écailles. The species holotype, specimen MNHN 1998–0397, was collected from Antécume-Pata, a village in Saint-Laurent-du-Maroni, French Guiana, and is housed at the Muséum national d'Histoire naturelle in Paris, France.

The fish is the smallest of the three species in the genus Cynodon, all of which are found in South America. The genus name Cynodon comes from the Greek kynós, meaning "dog", and odoús, meaning "tooth", which refers to a pair of long teeth resembling canine teeth exhibited by members of the genus. The specific name meionactis also comes from Greek; meióō means "to lessen", and aktís means "ray", describing the anal fin, which is comparably small versus that of the fish's congener, Cynodon gibbus.

== Distribution and habitat ==
C. meionactis occurs in coastal rivers in French Guiana and Suriname, including the Maroni. It is pelagic (living away from the shoreline) and hunts its prey near the water's surface.

== Description ==
C. meionactis reaches a maximum of 30 cm (12 in) in total length. Its body is elongated with compressed sides. It possesses 12 soft rays on the dorsal fin and 66–70 soft rays on the anal fin; 63–67 of the anal rays are branched. The pectoral fins are 28–30% of the fish's standard length. The vertical diameter of the eye is 29.9–35.5% of the height of the head. The fish possesses a humeral spot that is smaller than its eye.

The other two species in the Cynodon genus are C. gibbus and C. septenarius. C. meionactis can be differentiated from C. gibbus by the orbital diameter, which is larger in C. meionactis (averaging 31.8% of the head length) than in C. gibbus (averaging 29.2% of the head length). C. meionactis is distinguishable from C. septenarius by a dark band across the base of the caudal fin rays, which C. septenarius lacks; additionally, C. meionactis has eight pelvic fin rays, whereas C. septenarius has seven.

== Biology and ecology ==
This species is primarily a piscivore (a fish-eating predator). It is oviparous.

== Conservation ==
C. meionactis is assessed as a least concern species on the IUCN Red List, as it faces few threats from human activities in its range, which includes multiple protected areas.

There is limited gold mining in its range, which is a potential threat to the fish's ecosystem. Gold mining methods can cause elemental mercury pollution, the results of which are more pronounced among predatory species due to biomagnification. A 2001 study examined 48 fish species for mercury contamination in French Guiana and found higher mercury levels in C. meionactis and Pseudoplatystoma fasciatum than in any other tested species.

This species is likely taken by subsistence fishermen. However, it is rarely consumed because it is very bony, making it difficult to eat.
