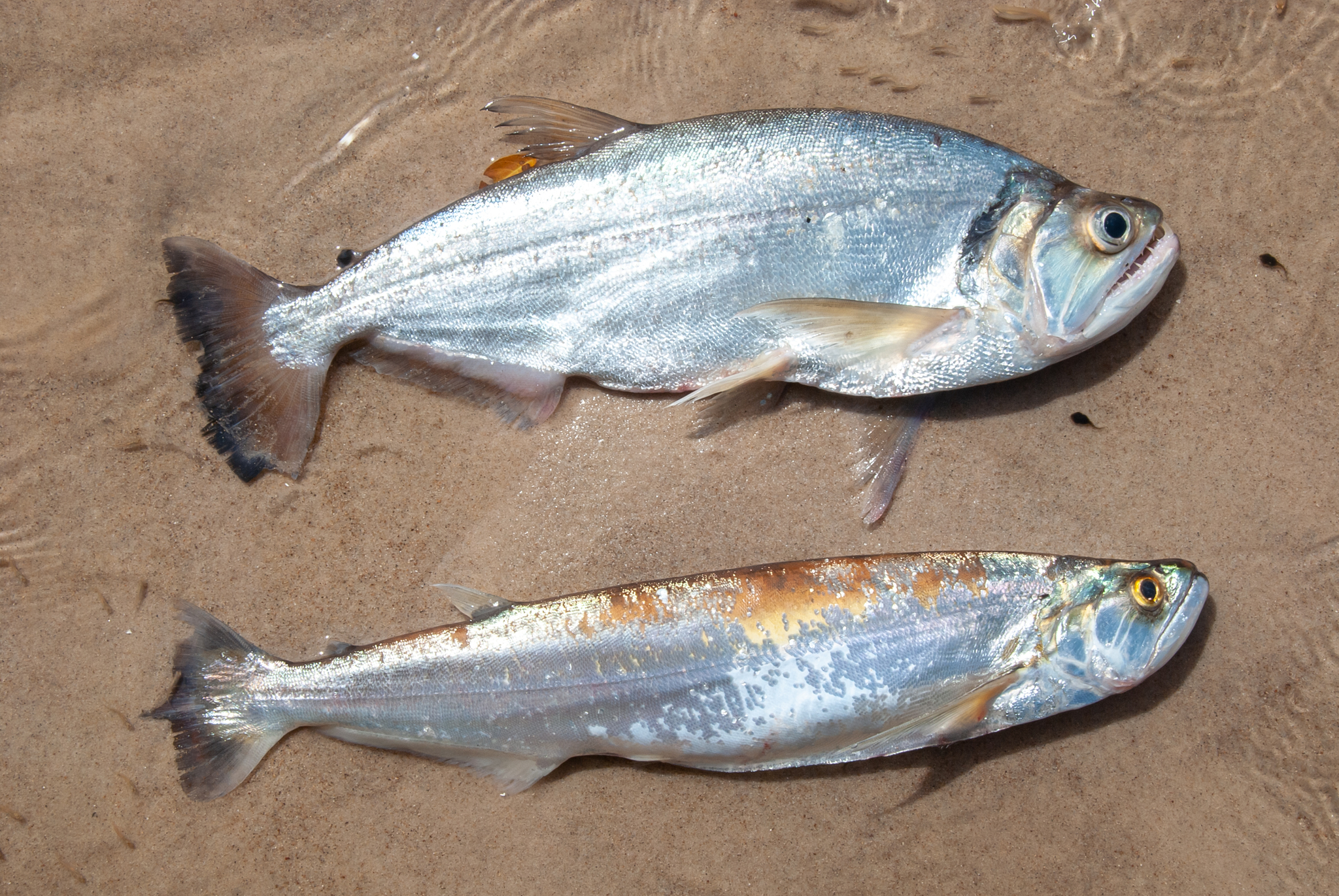
- Hydrolycus armatus (top), Rhaphiodon vulpinus (bottom)

Scientific classification
- Kingdom: Animalia
- Phylum: Chordata
- Class: Actinopterygii
- Order: Characiformes
- Suborder: Characoidei
- Family: Cynodontidae; C. H. Eigenmann, 1903

Genera
- see text

= Cynodontidae =

Cynodontidae Temporal range: Miocene - present

Family of fishes

Cynodontidae, from Ancient Greek κύων (kúōn), meaning "dog", and ὀδούς (odoús), meaning "tooth", also known as dogtooth characins or vampire tetras, are a family of predatory, characiform freshwater fishes from South America. This group is not very diverse, and includes only three genera and eight species. The largest species in this family ranges up to 117 cm (3.84 ft).

They are characterized by an oblique mouth and very long distinct canines, which are used to capture and stab their prey, other fish that can be up to half the length of the cynodontine itself. They are not prized as food fish, but are important in subsistence and commercial fisheries. Hydrolycus are game fish, having been recently added to the International Game Fish Association in the fly and rod class. Cynodontid fish are also sometimes housed in aquaria.

== Taxonomy ==
This monophyletic family contains only a few species: three species of Cynodon, four species of Hydrolycus, and one species in the monotypic genus Rhaphiodon, Rhaphiodon vulpinus. These fish have been previously classified within Characidae.

Rhaphiodon and Cynodon are sister groups to each other; these two genera together have a sister group relationship to the genus Hydrolycus.

The subfamily Roestinae was previously placed in this family, but are now known to be more closely related to Acestrorhynchus, and are now placed in the Acestrorhynchidae.

=== Species ===
Hydrolycus species here are ordered based on their relationships from the most basal to the most apomorphic based on sister group relationships when possible. Descriptions and dates based on ITIS.

Image	Genus	Species
R. vulpinus	Rhaphiodon Spix and Agassiz, 1829	Rhaphiodon vulpinus Spix and Agassiz, 1829 (biara)
C. gibbus	Cynodon Agassiz, 1829	Cynodon gibbus (Agassiz, 1829); Cynodon meionactis Géry, Le Bail and Keith, 1999; Cynodon septenarius Toledo-Piza, 2000
H. tatauaia	Hydrolycus Müller and Troschel, 1844	Hydrolycus wallacei Toledo-Piza, Menezes & dos Santos, 1999; Hydrolycus scomberoides (Cuvier, 1819) (payara); Hydrolycus armatus (Jardine and Schomburgk in Schomburgk, 1841) (payara); Hydrolycus tatauaia Toledo-Piza, Menezes and dos Santos, 1999

== Physical characteristics ==
Cynodontidae are elongated in shape with a silvery or grey colour and an upturned mouth. Some species have a hunchbacked appearance. The family names (both scientific and common) derive from the long and well-developed canines which are used to spear their prey, mainly other fish. Their pectoral fins are also expanded. The maximum length reached is 117 cm (46 in).

== Distribution and habitat ==
Cynodontinae species are found throughout the Orinoco and Amazon basins, as well as the rivers of the Guianas. Of the cynodontines, R. vulpinus has the greatest distribution, including the Paraná-Paraguay River and Uruguay River basins. Fossil teeth have been found in the Magdalena River basin and Salta, Argentina, where cynodontines are not currently found.

== Relationship to humans ==
Hydrolycus species are game fish, having been recently added to the International Game Fish Association in the fly and rod class. Cynodontid fish are also sometimes kept in aquaria.

== See also ==
- List of fish families
