= Hydrolycus wallacei =

Conservation status
- Least Concern (IUCN 3.1)

Scientific classification
- Kingdom: Animalia
- Phylum: Chordata
- Class: Actinopterygii
- Order: Characiformes
- Family: Cynodontidae
- Genus: Hydrolycus
- Species: H. wallacei

Binomial name
- Hydrolycus wallacei Toledo-Piza, Menezes & dos Santos, 1999

Species if fish

Hydrolycus wallacei, Wallace's payara, is a species of freshwater ray-finned fish belonging to the family Cynodontidae, the dogtooth tetras. This fish is found in the upper Orinoco and Rio Negro in Brazil, Venezuela and Colombia.
