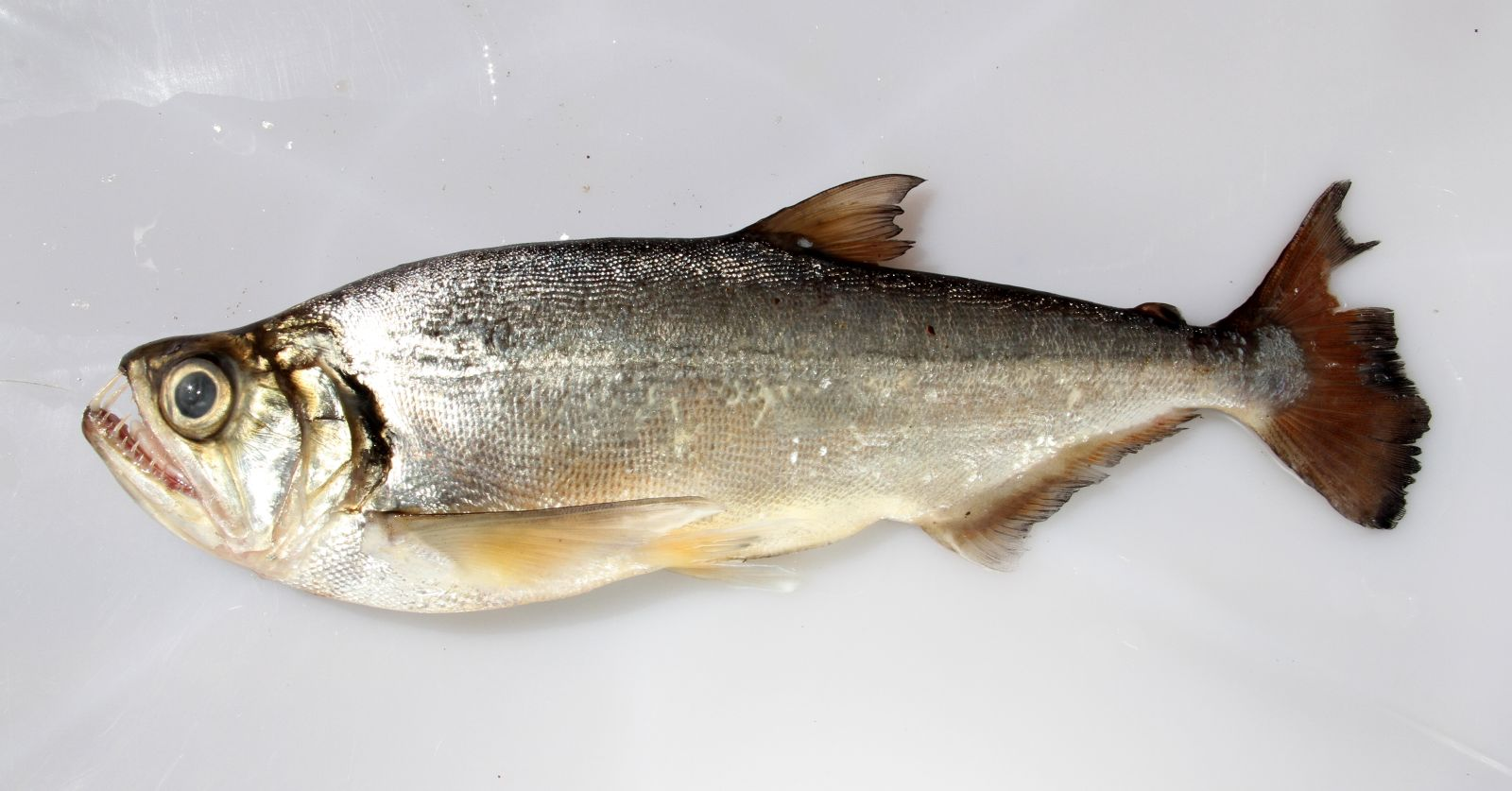

Conservation status
- Least Concern (IUCN 3.1)

Scientific classification
- Kingdom: Animalia
- Phylum: Chordata
- Class: Actinopterygii
- Order: Characiformes
- Family: Cynodontidae
- Genus: Hydrolycus
- Species: H. tatauaia

Binomial name
- Hydrolycus tatauaia Toledo-Piza, Menezes & dos Santos, 1999

= Hydrolycus tatauaia =

Species of fish

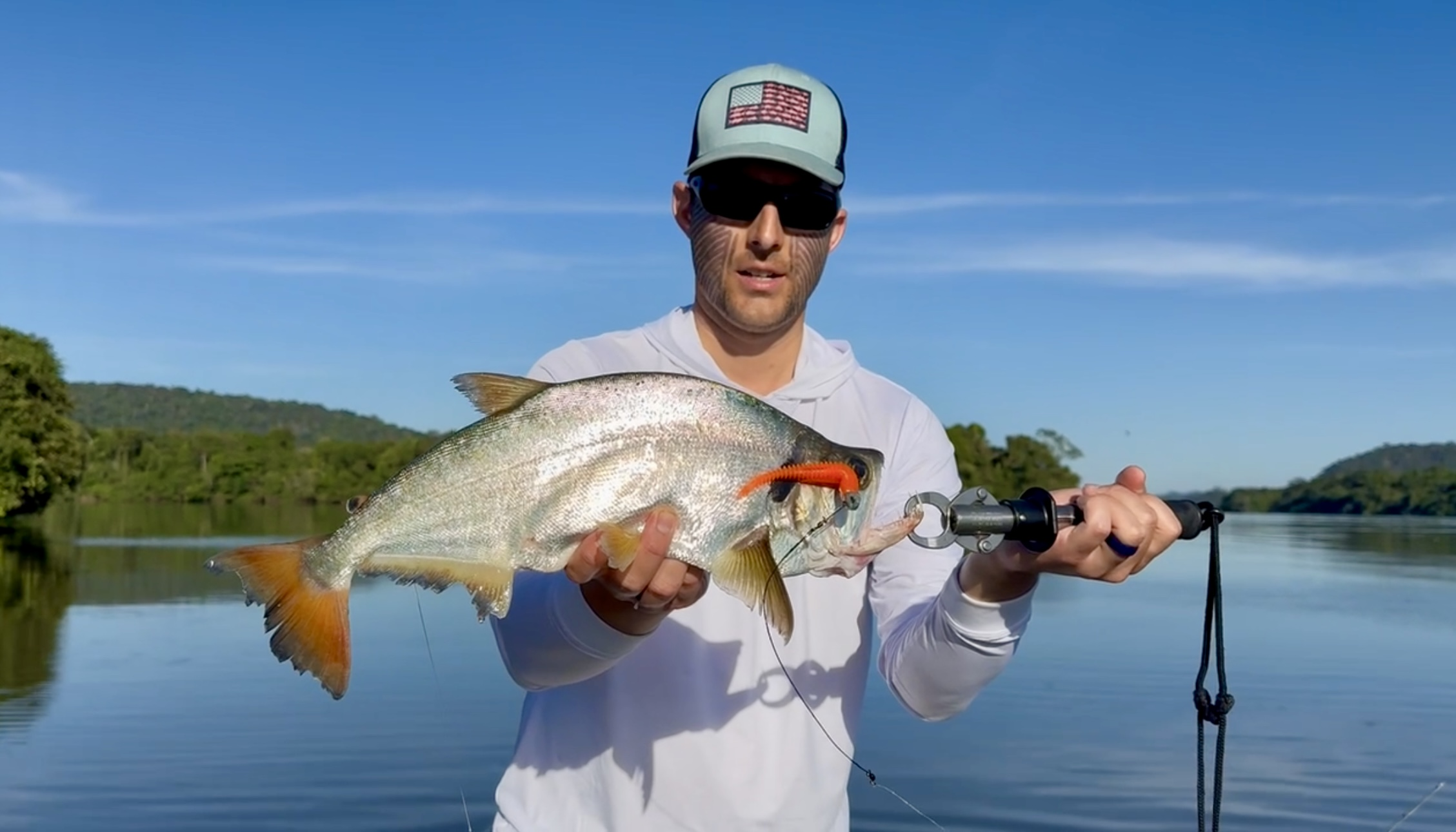
Hydrolycus tatauaia aka Orange-Tail Payara

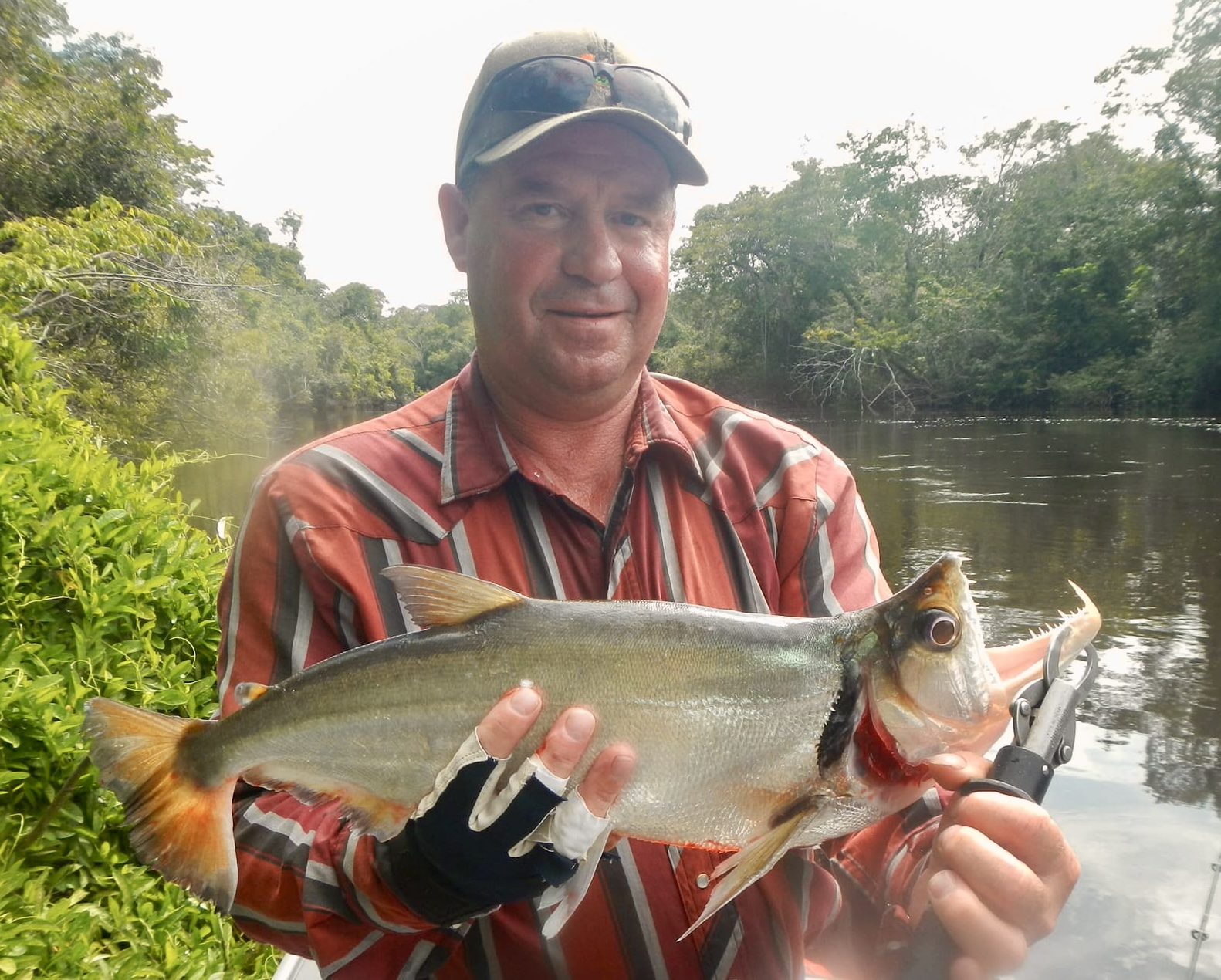
Orange-Tail Payara from the Rio Aripuanã

Hydrolycus tatauaia, the orange-tail payara, is a species of dogtooth characin found in the Amazon, Orinoco and Essequibo basins in tropical South America. Adults mainly occur in deep and/or fast-flowing rivers. It is migratory, moving upstream to breed in November–April.

Like other Hydrolycus species, H. tatauaia has long pointed canine teeth that are used to spear their prey, generally smaller fish. The body and head are silvery, and there is a vertically elongated dark spot behind the opercle. The tail is reddish to orange. The species name tatauaia is of Tupi origin and means "fire tail". It reaches up to 59 cm (1 ft 11 in) in total length and 2.7 kg (5 lb 15 oz) in weight.

This predatory fish occasionally makes its way into the aquarium trade, but it requires a very large tank.
