= Cynodon septenarius =

Conservation status
- Least Concern (IUCN 3.1)

Scientific classification
- Kingdom: Animalia
- Phylum: Chordata
- Class: Actinopterygii
- Order: Characiformes
- Family: Cynodontidae
- Genus: Cynodon
- Species: C. septenarius

Binomial name
- Cynodon septenarius Toledo-Piza, 2000

Species of fish

Cynodon septenarius is a species of freshwater ray-finned fish belonging to the family Cynodontidae, the dogtooth tetras. This species is found in northern South America.

== Taxonomy ==
Cynodon septenarius was first formally described in 2000 by the Brazilian ichthyologist Mônica Toledo-Piza with its type locality given as Rio Tefé, supiã-Pacu, between 3°40" and 4°20'S, 65°50' and 65°10'W, Amazonas in Brazil. This species is classified in the genus Cynodon which is in the family Cynodontidae, the dogtooth tetras, of the suborder Characoidei of the order Characiformes.

== Etymology ==
Cynodon septenarius is classified within the genus Cynodon, a name which places the Greek kynos, meaning "dog", in its genitive case as kyon, with odon, meaning "tooth". This is a reference to the pair of robust canine-like teeth poseessed by these fishes. The specific name, septenarius, means "containing seven", a reference to the seven branched fin rays in the pelvic fins.

== Description ==
Cynodon septenarius does not have a band of dark pigment on the base of the caudal fin rays, unlike C. gibbus, although there may be some scattered spots of pigment on the caudal peduncle and caudal fin. There are 7 branched fin rays in the pectoral fins, compared to 8 in the other two species in the genus. This fish has a maximum standard length of 31.2 cm (12.3 in).

== Distribution ==
Cynodon septenarius is found in the catchment of the Amazon east of the Rio Iça on the border of Brazil and Colombia, including the Negro, Branco, Trombetas, and Tapajós Rivers, as well as in the Orinoco and Essequibo Rivers.
