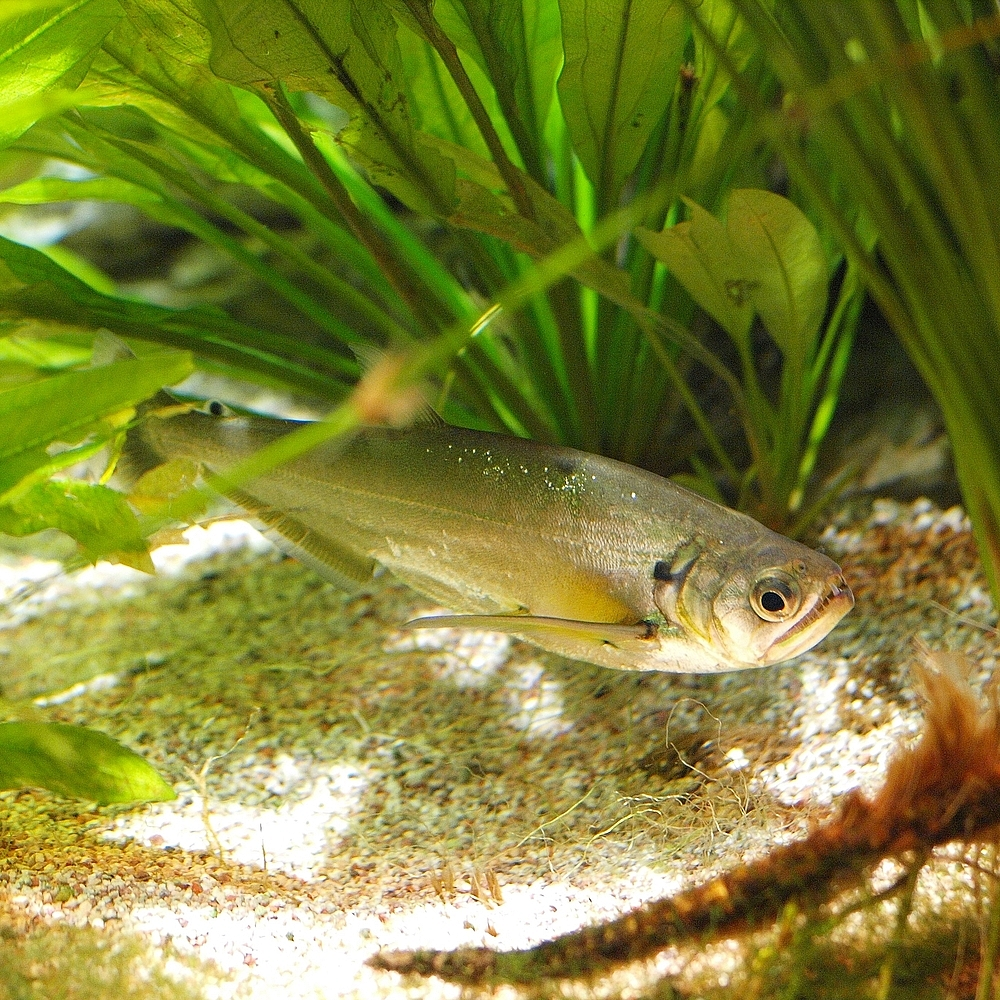
- at Toba Aquarium, Japan

Conservation status
- Least Concern (IUCN 3.1)

Scientific classification
- Kingdom: Animalia
- Phylum: Chordata
- Class: Actinopterygii
- Order: Characiformes
- Family: Cynodontidae
- Genus: Hydrolycus
- Species: H. scomberoides

Binomial name
- Hydrolycus scomberoides (Cuvier, 1819)

Synonyms
- Hydrocyon scomberoides Cuvier, 1819; Cynodon pectoralis Günther, 1866

= Payara =

Species of fish

The payara (Hydrolycus scomberoides) is a species of dogtooth tetra. This predatory fish is found in the Amazon Basin in tropical South America. It was the first of four species to be described in the genus Hydrolycus.

== Description ==
The most noticeable feature of H. scomberoides is the two long fangs protruding from its lower jaw. These are used to impale its prey, mostly smaller fish. It typically reaches a standard length of about 30 cm (1.0 ft), but can reach up to 51 cm (1 ft 8 in). Reports exist of far larger individuals, up to 117 cm (3 ft 10 in) in total length and 17.8 kg (39 lb 4 oz) in weight, based on records by IGFA, but this likely involves confusion with the related H. armatus.

H. scomberoides is overall silvery with a dark spot behind the opercle and another at the lower base of the pectoral fin. In adults, the tail is dusky on the basal half, turning paler (more transparent) towards the tip.

== In the aquarium ==
The payara, which is also sold as the sabertooth barracuda, vampire fish, vampire tetra, or sabertusk barracuda, is a popular species for large, aggressive aquaria. It requires a large aquarium and can only be mixed with relatively large species, as smaller fish will be seen as potential prey.
