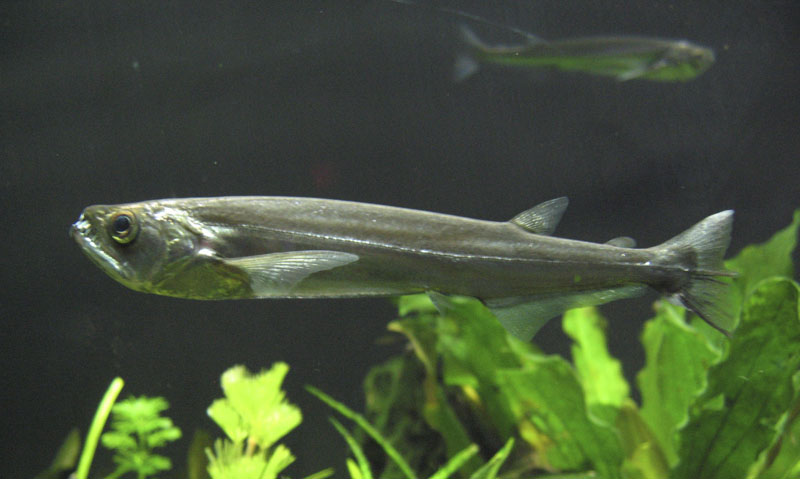

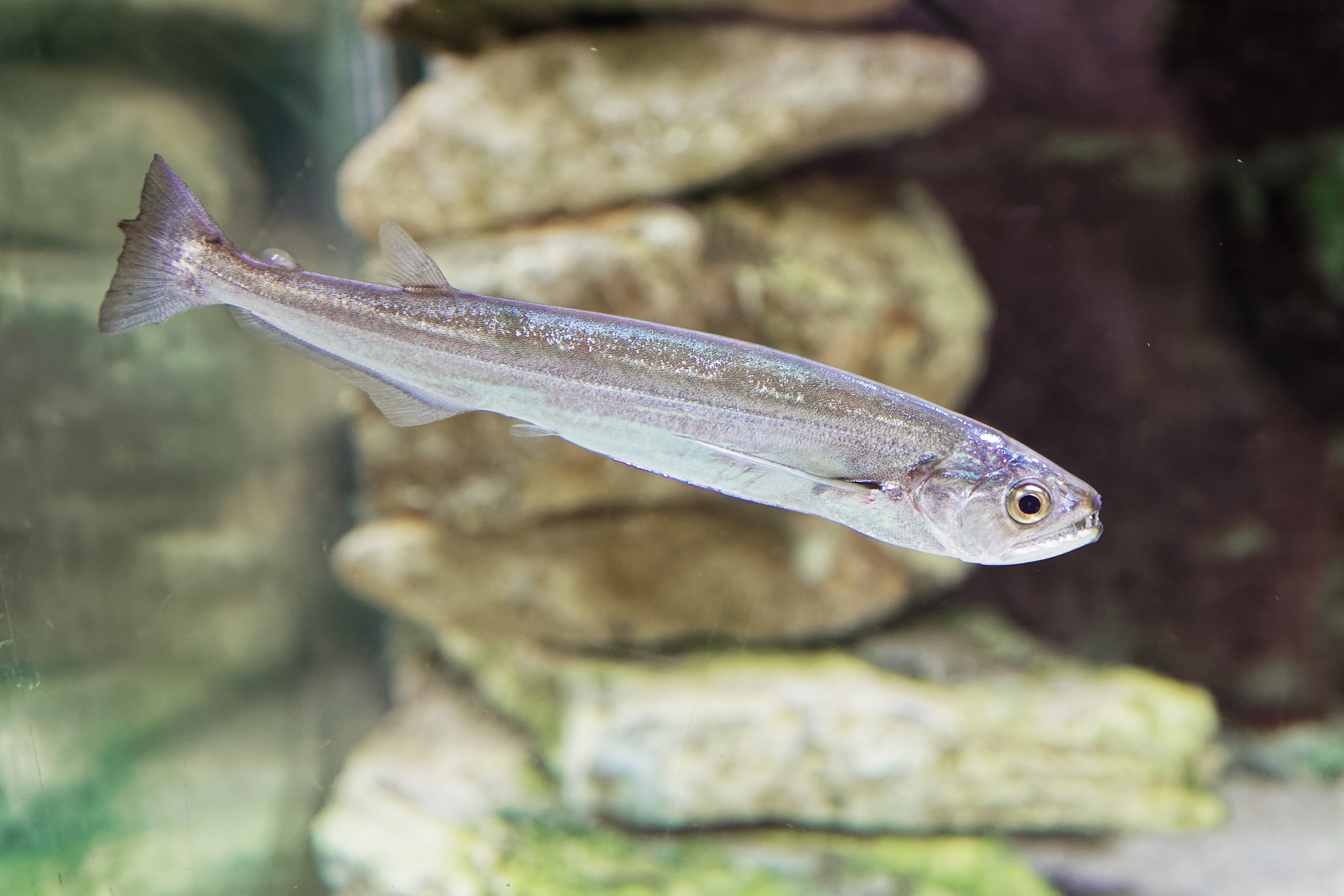

Conservation status
- Least Concern (IUCN 3.1)

Scientific classification
- Kingdom: Animalia
- Phylum: Chordata
- Class: Actinopterygii
- Order: Characiformes
- Suborder: Characoidei
- Family: Cynodontidae
- Genus: Rhaphiodon; Agassiz, 1829
- Species: R. vulpinus

Binomial name
- Rhaphiodon vulpinus Spix & Agassiz, 1829

= Biara =

Genus of fishes

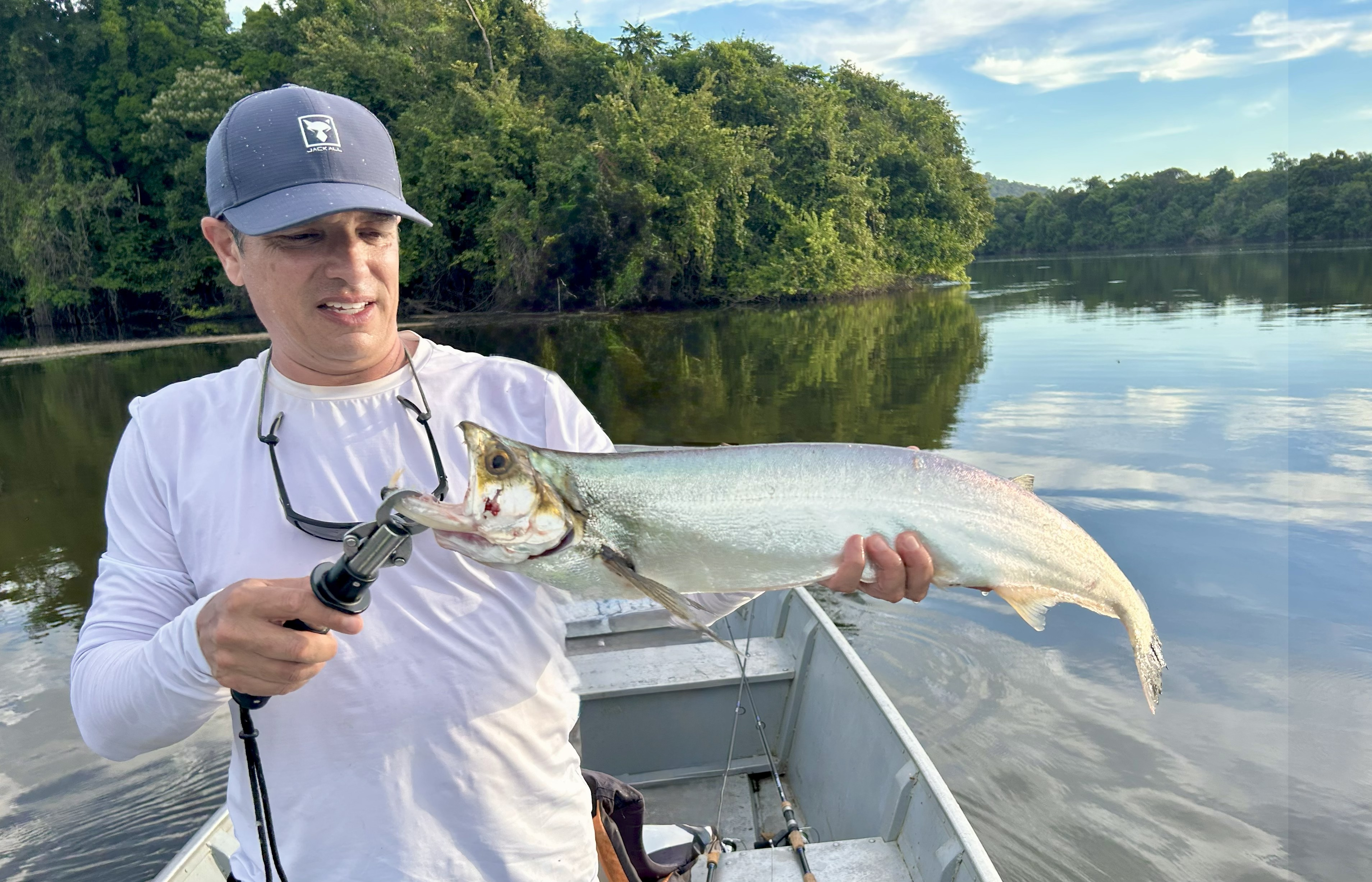
Biara aka Machete Payara caught in the Amazon on a fishing expedition

The biara (Rhaphiodon vulpinus), also known at Machete Payara is a South American piscivorous fish in the dogtooth characin family. It belongs to the monotypic genus Rhaphiodon, although some minor differences in morphometrics and colour are known from across its large range. It is found in the Amazon, Orinoco, and Río de la Plata Basins, as well as rivers of the Guianas. It occurs in a wide range of freshwater habitats such as main river channels, flooded forests, lakes and reservoirs. Some populations are migratory.

== Description ==
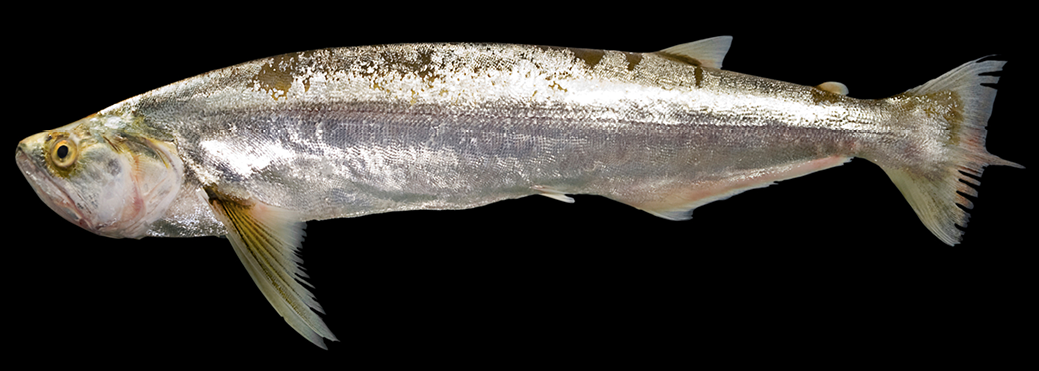
From the Acre River, Brazil

It reaches up to 2.1 kg (4 lb 10 oz) in weight. Although it reportedly can reach up to 80 cm (2 ft 7 in) in standard length, the largest confirmed were 63–64 cm (about 2 ft 1 in) Like other dogtooth characins, the biara has very long pointed canine teeth, but it is easily separated from its relatives by its very elongated and streamlined body shape.

== Diet ==
Like its relatives, the biara feeds almost entirely on other fish, which are speared by the long canines. In a study of the stomach content of 100 biaras, the majority were empty. The remaining had prey fish that were 30–50% of the length of the biara itself, and only a single contained another prey type, a mayfly larvae.

== Reproduction ==
In a study observing the reproductive biology of the biara species in the Tocantins River of Brazil, it was found that the prime reproductive period takes place in November. The high-water conditions of the environment correlate to the increase of reproductive rate.

== Aquarium trade ==
The biara occasionally makes its way into the aquarium trade, but it requires a very large tank.
