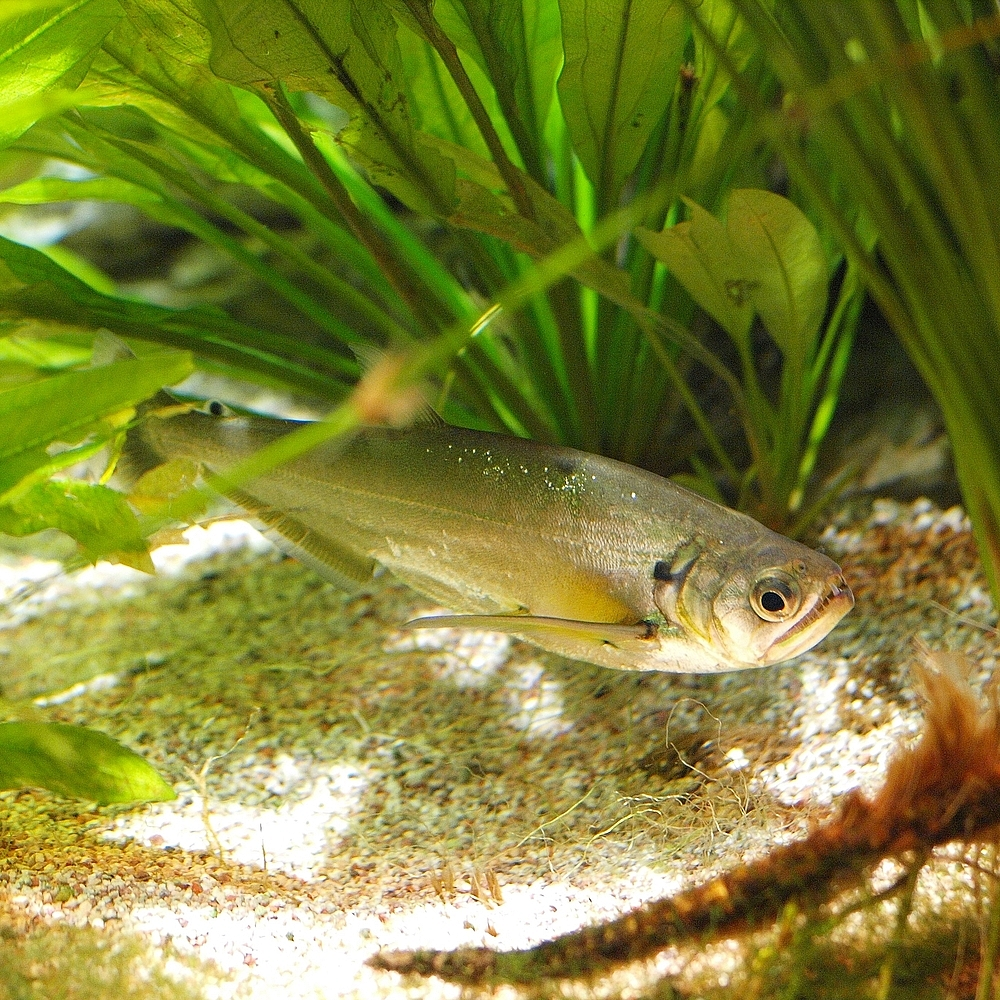
- Hydrolycus scomberoides

Scientific classification
- Kingdom: Animalia
- Phylum: Chordata
- Class: Actinopterygii
- Order: Characiformes
- Family: Cynodontidae
- Genus: Hydrolycus (J. P. Müller & Troschel, 1844)

Type species
- Hydrocyon scomberoides Cuvier, 1819

= Hydrolycus =

Genus of fishes

Hydrolycus is a genus of freshwater ray-finned fishes belonging to the family Cynodontidae, the dogtooth characins. These fishes are found in tropical South America, where found in the Amazon and Orinoco basins, as well as rivers of the Guianas. The genus includes the largest dogtooth characins, reaching up to 1.17 m (3.8 ft) in length. They have long, pointed teeth (shorter and less extreme in H. wallacei) used for spearing their prey, generally smaller fish. In a study of the stomachs of 45 individuals, most were empty, but among the remaining the prey fish were 15–50% of the length Hydrolycus itself.

In 1999 two new species were described, the first in this genus in 158 years.

== Species ==
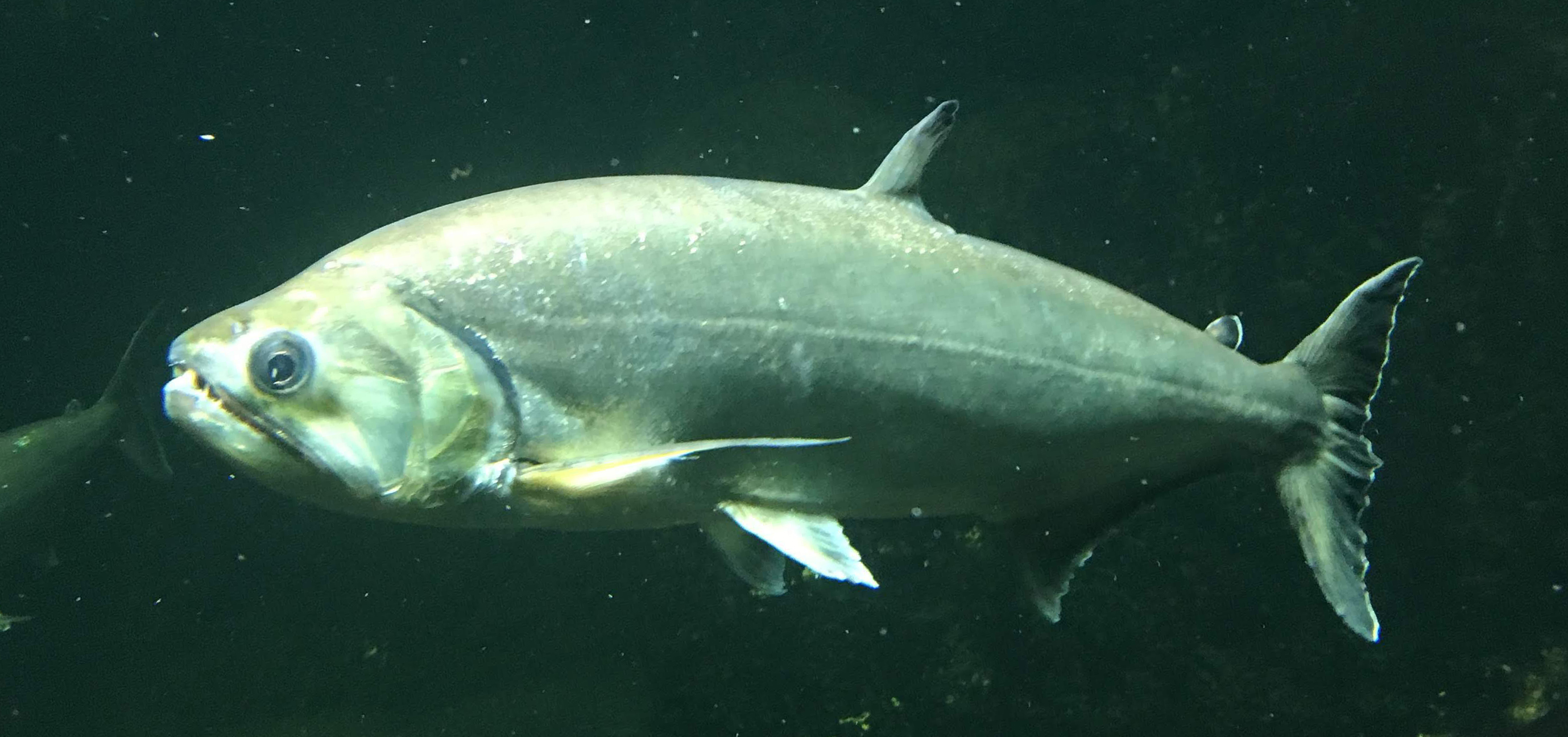
Hydrolycus armatus

There are currently four described species.

- Hydrolycus armatus (Jardine, 1841) (Payara)
- Hydrolycus scomberoides (G. Cuvier, 1819) (Payara)
- Hydrolycus tatauaia Toledo-Piza, Menezes & dos Santos, 1999
- Hydrolycus wallacei Toledo-Piza, Menezes & dos Santos, 1999
