= Blue tetra =

Blue tetra is a common name for species of tetra including:

- Boehlkea fredcochui
- Knodus borki
- Mimagoniates microlepis
- Tyttocharax madeirae, species of fish
