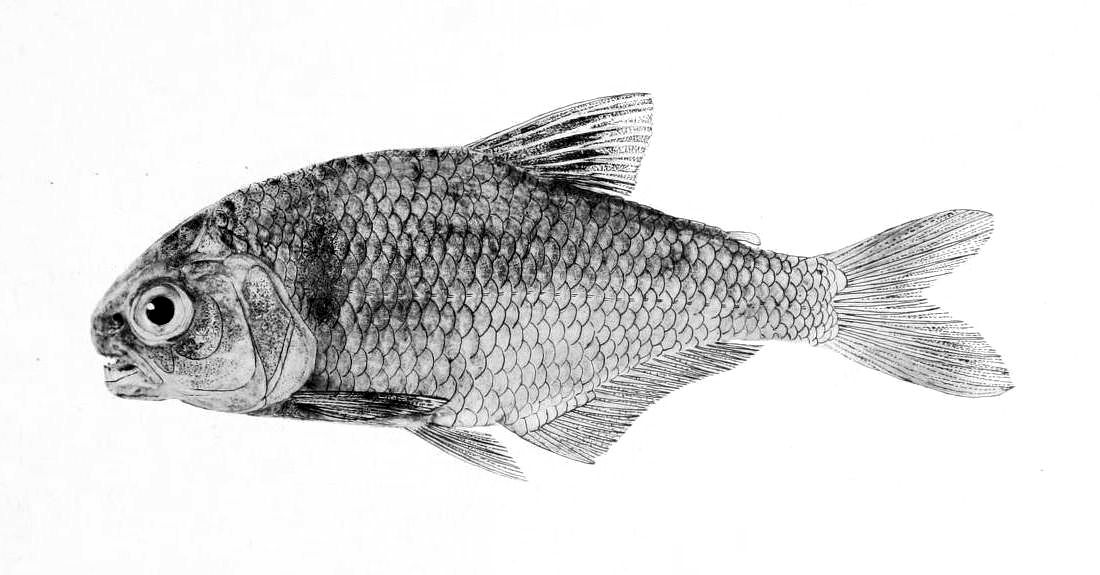
- 1917 illustration

Conservation status
- Near Threatened (IUCN 3.1)

Scientific classification
- Kingdom: Animalia
- Phylum: Chordata
- Class: Actinopterygii
- Order: Characiformes
- Family: Stevardiidae
- Subfamily: Creagrutinae
- Genus: Carlastyanax; Géry, 1972
- Species: C. aurocaudatus

Binomial name
- Carlastyanax aurocaudatus (C. H. Eigenmann, 1913)

Synonyms
- Astyanax aurocaudatus Eigenmann, 1913

= Carlastyanax =

Carlastyanax aurocaudatus

Genus of fishes

Carlastyanax is a monospecific genus of freshwater ray-finned fish belonging to the family Stevardiidae. The only species in this genus is Carlastyanax aurocaudatus, a characin, also known as the gold-tailed tetra, which is endemic to the upper part of the Rio Cauca drainage basin in Colombia.

The coloration of this species - a greenish-yellow back, a white belly, and fins that range from red to yellow - is notable for differing with the sex of the individual fish, a trait known as sexual dichromatism. Females have yellow-gold tail fins (which is where the species gets its name), and males have reddish or pinkish tail fins. Spawning occurs during various times of year in the chosen habitat of C. aurocaudatus, which is clearwater streams with organic or rocky substrate. Its range is relatively restricted, but is also home to the benthic insects and riparian plant material that make up its diet.

== Taxonomy ==
First named by German-American ichthyologist Carl H. Eigenmann in 1913, C. aurocaudatus has undergone rigorous taxonomic evaluation to determine its generic placement. Upon its nomination, it was considered to belong to the genus Astyanax, under the name Astyanax aurocaudatus.

In 1972, French ichthyologist Jacques Géry constructed a new genus for it, based on several features, including number and shape of teeth, the presence of an adipose fin, and number of gill rakers; specifically, one of the more important characteristics was said to be the presence of a hooked third dentary tooth. Carlastyanax was then re-synonymized with Astyanax in 2005 and 2006 by researchers, based upon morphological similarities more consistent with Astyanax than with a new genus, including the tooth.

However, more researchers in 2013 resurrected Carlastyanax from synonymy given further differentiating features, disregarding the hooked third dentary tooth. These include four teeth on the posterior premaxillary row (vs. five in all Astyanax) and eight branched dorsal-fin rays (vs. nine). A 2015 study of molecular phylogeny within the subfamily Stevardiinae (within Characidae) reaffirmed this decision. Today, Carlastyanax is considered a valid genus, and C. aurocaudatus its only species.

In 2017, the genus Carlastyanax was determined to be a part of a clade with genera Creagrutus and Piabina. However, in 2024, this taxon was placed in the subfamily Creagrutinae of the family Stevardiidae, within the suborder Characoidei of the order Characiformes.

=== Etymology ===
Carlastyanax aurocaudatus is sometimes known as the gold-tailed tetra. In fact, its specific epithet means "gold tail"; "auro-" means "gold", and "caudatus" means "tail". The genus name "Carlastyanax" is to honor Carl H. Eigenmann and the original genus to which C. audocaudatus once belonged, Astyanax.

== Description ==
Carlastyanax aurocaudatus usually reaches a size of 6.0 cm (2.3 in) standard length (SL). Larger specimens can reach 7.4 cm (2.9 in) SL. The dorsal fin has 8 rays, the pelvic fin 5–6, and the anal fin 26–28. The head is large, with a blunt snout, and the body is generally robust. The base scale color is white ventrally, with a green-to-yellow predorsal region and a lateral stripe in silver or silver-blue. The humeral spot is usually blue, and is elongated vertically, as well as somewhat obscure. The pectoral and pelvic fins are pink or red with a dark margin. The other fins are different colors depending on whether the individual specimen is female or male.

One species, Bryconamericus pectinatus, bears visual similarities to C. aurocaudatus, and was considered as a candidate for the genus upon its nomination; however, it remains in Bryconamericus.

=== Sexual dimorphism ===
Male and female specimens of C. aurocaudatus bear drastic differences to each other when it comes to coloration. In males, the anal and caudal fins are reddish, as is the caudal peduncle. The dorsal fin, with a dark margin, is white or yellow at the base. In females, the anal fin and the entire caudal region are yellow or yellow-gray as opposed to red. The dorsal fin still has a dark margin, but the base is often a dark yellow instead of pale. The difference in caudal-fin coloration was noted by Eigenmann in his original description ("In life the whole after part of the body and caudal peduncle golden or orange-red"), but was not recognized a sex characteristic.

Outside of coloration, there are other differences. While mature males of multiple other related genera bear hooks on various fins, male specimens of C. aurocaudatus lack these hooks and instead simply have enlarged fin-rays in comparison to female specimens. Males are also significantly larger.

== Distribution and habitat ==
Carlastyanax aurocaudatus has a restricted distribution, endemic solely to the upper Cauca River basin of Colombia, where it is found in various creeks and tributaries. It was originally cited from the Boquia area, in the department of Quindío.

Carlastyanax aurocaudatus has been described in areas with organic substrate. Further, it prefers clear waters, and a substrate of combined organic materials and stone is not uncommon in places it inhabits. It tends to linger close to the riverbed. Waters with a pH of 5.8–7.5 and a temperature range of 22 °C–25 °C appear to be its ideal habitat.

== Diet and ecology ==
More than half of the diet of C. aurocaudatus consists of insects, with aquatic larvae being the most prominent. Benthic insects are also common. The other portion consists of plant material, the vast majority of it allochthonous, and this proclivity for adaptability means that it does not compete with similar species that live within the same range; for instance, though other fishes may also target invertebrates, C. aurocaudatus does not consume enough for it to be of competitive concern, given its taste for food items like seeds and fruits.

Regardless of food availability, spawning is estimated to occur in the wet seasons (April to May, September to October) and dry seasons (January to February). Coloration of the anal and caudal fins becomes more vibrant during these stretches of time.

Carlastyanax aurocaudatus has been observed living syntopically with Cetopsorhandia boquillae, Trichomycterus caliense, and Poecilia caucae.

== Conservation status ==
Carlastyanax aurocaudatus is considered a near threatened species by the IUCN. It has a relatively restricted range, and conservation challenges are largely in the form of agricultural development, which not only causes pollution but prompts deforestation (which in turn destroys the relevant riparian zones). However, it is unknown as to whether or not this is having a direct effect on the C. aurocaudatus population as a whole.
