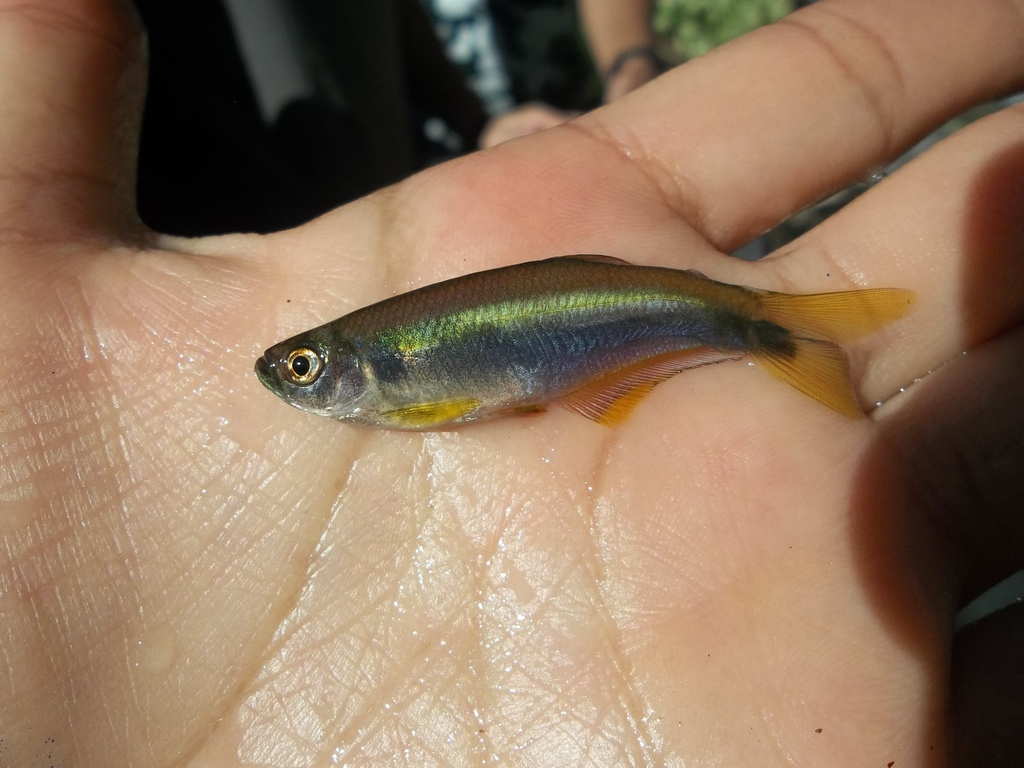

Conservation status
- Least Concern (IUCN 3.1)

Scientific classification
- Kingdom: Animalia
- Phylum: Chordata
- Class: Actinopterygii
- Division: Teleostei
- Order: Characiformes
- Family: Stevardiidae
- Genus: Mimagoniates
- Species: M. microlepis

Binomial name
- Mimagoniates microlepis (Steindachner, 1877)

Synonyms
- Paragoniates microlepis Steindachner, 1877; Coelurichthys iporangae Miranda-Ribeiro, 1908

= Mimagoniates microlepis =

Species of fish

Mimagoniates microlepis, also known as the blue tetra (a common name shared with Tyttocharax madeirae, Knodus borki, and possibly other Characidae, as well), the croaking tetra (a name also applied to Mimagoniates inequalis and Mimagoniates lateralis), the small-scaled tetra, is a species of freshwater ray-finned fish belonging to the family Stevardiidae. First identified by Franz Steindachner in 1876 and named Paragoniates microlepis, it has also been identified as Coelurichthys iporangae (Miranda-Ribeiro, 1908), Coelurichthys lateralis, and Mimagoniates iporangae (McAllister, 1990) besides its current taxonomic classification. There is evidence of a variety called M. microlepis 'Joinville' which might be synonymous with Paragoniates microlepis.

== Habitat ==
This freshwater fish is found in clear coastal rivers and streams in eastern Brazil, ranging from southern Bahia to northern Rio Grande do Sul. It prefers temperatures of 18–23 °C (64–73 °F).

== Anatomy ==
Mimagoniates microlepis typically reaches up to 6.1 cm (2.4 in) in length, but captives have reached 9 cm (3.5 in). Genetic diversity with the species is evidenced by its variable phenotype. For example, in one wild-caught specimen, a brownish-black stripe runs along either side of its body from head to tail. Directly above this and touching it is stripe of similar size but of a lighter brown-beige color. It has a sort of blueish-purplish sheen all over. Except for this sheen, the two stripes, and the internal organs, it is mostly transparent, similar to the so-called "X-ray tetra", Pristella maxillaris. By comparison, an aquarium-bred specimen is mostly opaque and has much less prominent markings, and a specimen caught near Ubatuba has an appearance somewhat between those of the two previously described. According to a 2008 report, "phylogeographic studies based on molecular data indicate significant differences between the isolated populations of M. microlepis."

Males have a modified breathing organ with which they make sound during courtship. They also have a modified caudal gland used to release pheromones, a characteristic they share with all members of the Glandulocaudinae subfamily.

== Sound ==
Like related species sometimes referred to as "croaking tetras" or "chirping tetras", M. microlepis has a supplementary breathing organ located above its gills which makes a faint chirping sound when it comes to the surface to gulp air. This noise also plays a role in courtship, as the male chases and hovers near the female while taking gulps of air and expelling it to make a rhythmic sound. Croaking behavior may have evolved from a behavior called "nipping surface", a feeding behavior that occurs when the fish is searching for food; the fish often will gulp air when doing this. This behavior has no useful respiratory function.

== Cultivation ==
Mimagoniates microlepis is cultivated by aquarists and is appropriate for inclusion in a tank with other species of nonaggressive fish. They accept frozen and dry food, but live food is especially recommended.

Breeding them is not difficult, and a spawning mop (a sort of synthetic plant resembling the head of an old-fashioned mop) may be used as a substrate upon which they can lay and fertilize their eggs. The parents should then be removed so that they do not cannibalize their eggs or young. The fry emerge from their eggs in two or three days. Newborn M. microlepis may be fed firstly paramecia and rotifers. After increasing their size somewhat, brine shrimp may be offered.
