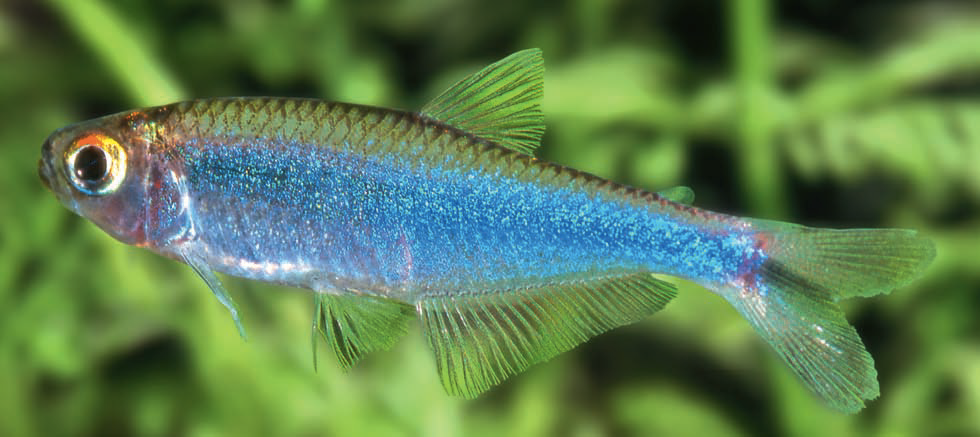
- Knodus borki

Scientific classification
- Kingdom: Animalia
- Phylum: Chordata
- Class: Actinopterygii
- Order: Characiformes
- Family: Stevardiidae
- Subfamily: Diapominae
- Genus: Knodus; C. H. Eigenmann, 1911

Type species
- Knodus meridae C. H. Eigenmann, 1911

Synonyms
- Bryconadenos Weitzman, Menezes, Evers & Burns, 2005

= Knodus =

Genus of fishes

Knodus is a genus of freshwater ray-finned fishes, characins, belonging to the family Stevardiidae. The fishes in this genus are found in South America.

== Species ==
Knodus contains the following valid species:

- Knodus alpha (C. H. Eigenmann, 1914)
- Knodus angustus Menezes, K. M. Ferreira & Netto-Ferreira, 2020
- Knodus borari Silva-Oliveira, Canto & Ribeiro, 2023
- Knodus borki Zarske, 2008
- Knodus breviceps (C. H. Eigenmann, 1908)
- Knodus chapadae (Fowler, 1906)
- Knodus cinarucoensis (Román-Valencia, Taphorn & Ruiz-C., 2008)
- Knodus cismontanus (C. H. Eigenmann, 1914)
- Knodus cupariensis de Sousa, Silva-Oliveira, Canto & Ribeiro, 2020
- Knodus delta Géry, 1972
- Knodus deuterodonoides (C. H. Eigenmann, 1914)
- Knodus diaphanus (Cope, 1878)
- Knodus dorsomaculatus K. M. Ferreira & Netto-Ferreira, 2010
- Knodus figueiredoi Esguícero & R. M. C. Castro, 2014
- Knodus gamma Géry, 1972
- Knodus geryi F. C. T. Lima, Britski & Machado, 2004
- Knodus heteresthes (C. H. Eigenmann, 1908)
- Knodus hypopterus (Fowler, 1943)
- Knodus longus Zarske & Géry, 2006
- Knodus macarenae (Román-Valencia, García-Alzate, Ruiz-C. & Taphorn, 2010)
- Knodus megalops G. S. Myers, 1929
- Knodus meridae C. H. Eigenmann, 1911
- Knodus mizquae (Fowler, 1943)
- Knodus moenkhausii (C. H. Eigenmann & C. H. Kennedy, 1903)
- Knodus nuptialis Menezes & Marinho, 2019
- Knodus obolus Deprá, Ota, Vitorino Júnior & K. M. Ferreira 2021
- Knodus orteguasae (Fowler, 1943)
- Knodus pasco Zarske, 2007
- Knodus savannensis Géry, 1961
- Knodus septentrionalis Géry, 1972
- Knodus shinahota K. M. Ferreira & Carvajal-Vallejos, 2007
- Knodus smithi (Fowler, 1913)
- Knodus tanaothoros (Weitzman, Menezes, Evers & Burns, 2005)
- Knodus tiquiensis K. M. Ferreira & F. C. T. Lima, 2006
- Knodus victoriae (Steindachner, 1907)
- Knodus weitzmani (Menezes, Netto-Ferreira & K. M. Ferreira, 2009)
- Knodus ytuanama K. M. Ferreira and W. M. Ohara, 2022
