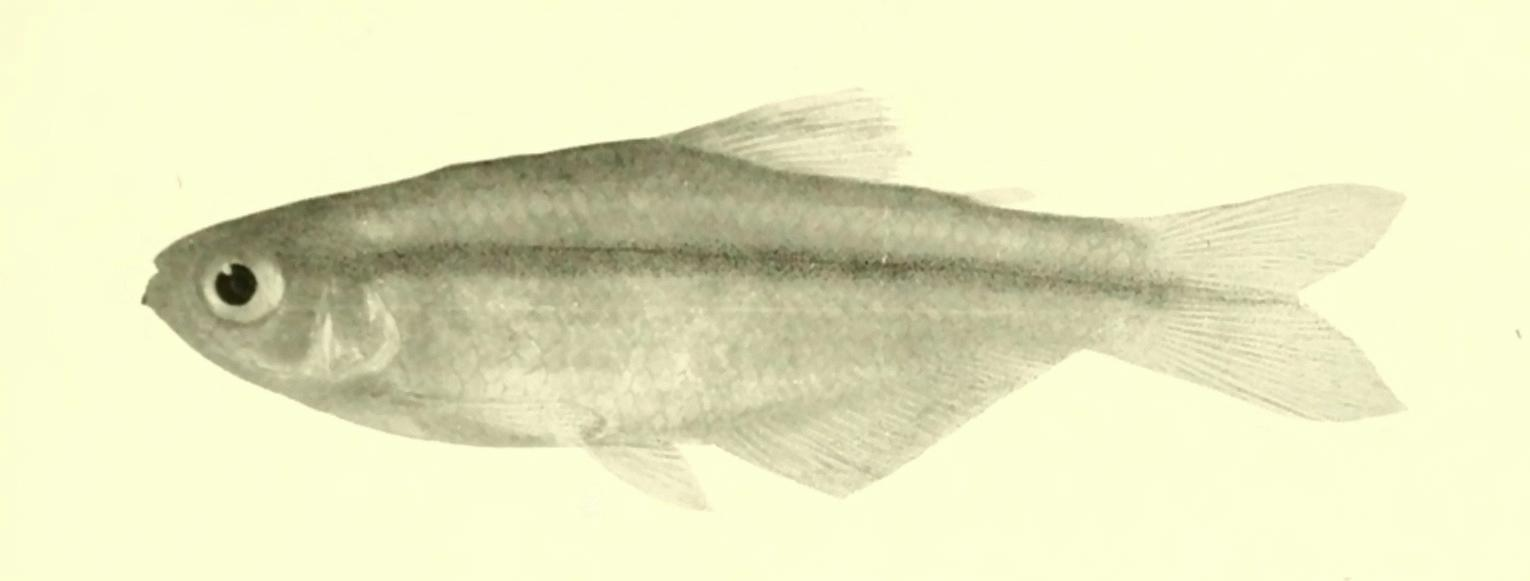
- Glandulocauda melanopleura

Scientific classification
- Kingdom: Animalia
- Phylum: Chordata
- Class: Actinopterygii
- Order: Characiformes
- Family: Stevardiidae
- Subfamily: Glandulocaudinae
- Genus: Glandulocauda; C. H. Eigenmann, 1911

Type species
- Glandulocauda melanogenys (a synonym of Glandulocauda melanopleura) C. H. Eigenmann, 1911

= Glandulocauda =

Genus of fishes

Glandulocauda is a genus of freshwater ray-finned fish belonging to the family Stevardiidae. The fishes in this genus are endemic to Brazil, restricted to the upper Paraná basin and coastal river basins in São Paulo state. The genus it is closely related to Lophiobrycon and Mimagoniates, and they form the tribe Glandulocaudini.

== Species ==
Glandulocauda contains the following species:

- Glandulocauda caerulea Menezes & Weitzman, 2009
- Glandulocauda melanopleura (M. D. Ellis, 1911)
