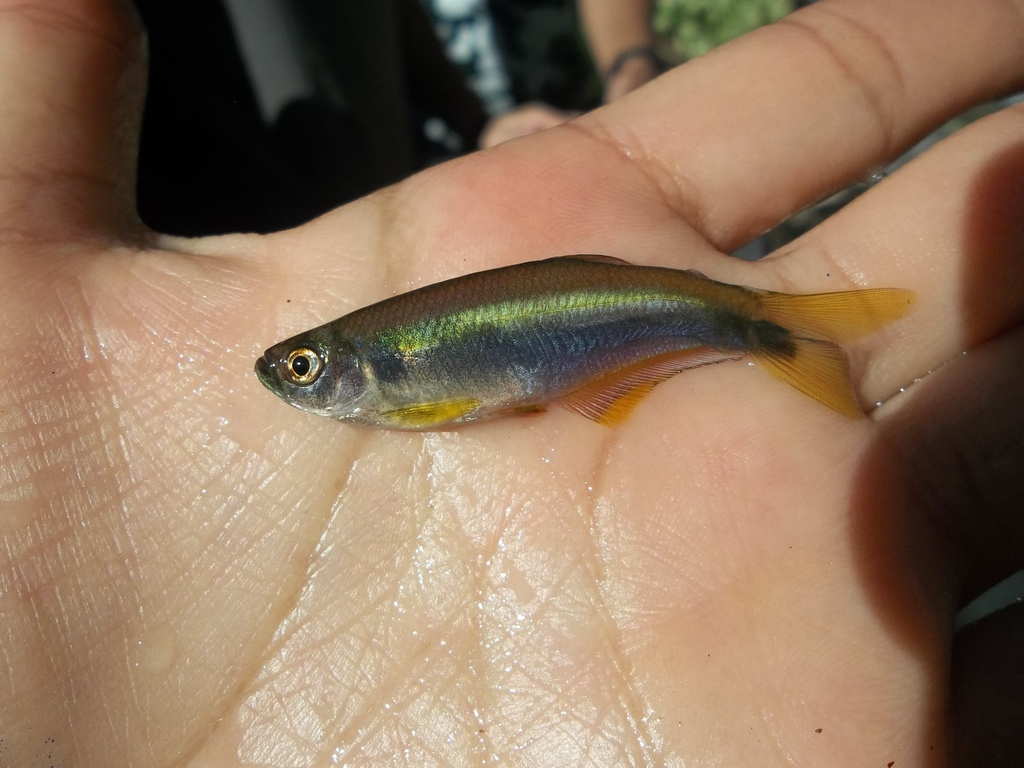
- Blue tetra (Mimagoniates microlepis)

Scientific classification
- Kingdom: Animalia
- Phylum: Chordata
- Class: Actinopterygii
- Division: Teleostei
- Order: Characiformes
- Family: Stevardiidae
- Subfamily: Glandulocaudinae
- Genus: Mimagoniates; Regan, 1907

Type species
- Mimagoniates barberi Regan, 1907

Synonyms
- Coelurichthys Miranda-Ribeiro, 1908

= Mimagoniates =

Genus of fishes

Mimagoniates is a genus of freshwater ray-finned fishes belonging to the family Stevardiidae. This species is found in rivers and streams in southeastern, southern and central-western Brazil, northeastern Argentina, and Paraguay. The individual species generally have relatively small ranges. Two species, M. lateralis and M. sylvicola, are considered threatened by Brazil's Ministry of the Environment.

Commonly known as croaking tetra or chirping tetra because they can produce sounds, some of these fish were historically included in Glandulocauda, and, together with Lophiobrycon, they form the tribe Glandulocaudini. Mimagoniates have a supplementary breathing organ located above the gills which makes a faint chirping sound when these fish come to the surface to gulp air. It also plays a role in courtship, as the male chases and hovers near the female while taking gulps of air and expelling it to make a rhythmic noise. Croaking behavior may have evolved from a behavior called "surface nipping", which occurs when the fish is searching for food. This gulping of air has no useful respiratory function.

They are small fish, up to 3–6.1 cm (1.2–2.4 in) in standard length, depending on the species.

== Species ==
Mimagoniates contains the following species:

- Mimagoniates barberi Regan, 1907
- Mimagoniates inequalis (C. H. Eigenmann, 1911) (Croaking tetra)
- Mimagoniates lateralis (Nichols, 1913)
- Mimagoniates microlepis (Steindachner, 1877) (Blue tetra)
- Mimagoniates pulcher Menezes & Weitzman, 2009
- Mimagoniates rheocharis Menezes & Weitzman, 1990
- Mimagoniates sylvicola Menezes & Weitzman, 1990
