= Piabarchus =

Scientific classification
- Kingdom: Animalia
- Phylum: Chordata
- Class: Actinopterygii
- Order: Characiformes
- Family: Stevardiidae
- Subfamily: Diapominae
- Genus: Piabarchus; G. S. Myers, 1928

Type species
- Piabina analis C. H. Eigenmann, 1914

Genus of fishes

Piabarchus is a genus of freshwater ray-finned fishes, characins, belonging to the family Stevardiidae. The fishes in this genus are found in tropical South America.

== Species ==
Piabarchus contains the following valid species:

- Piabarchus analis (C. H. Eigenmann, 1914)
- Piabarchus stramineus (C. H. Eigenmann, 1908)
- Piabarchus torrenticola Mahnert & Géry, 1988
