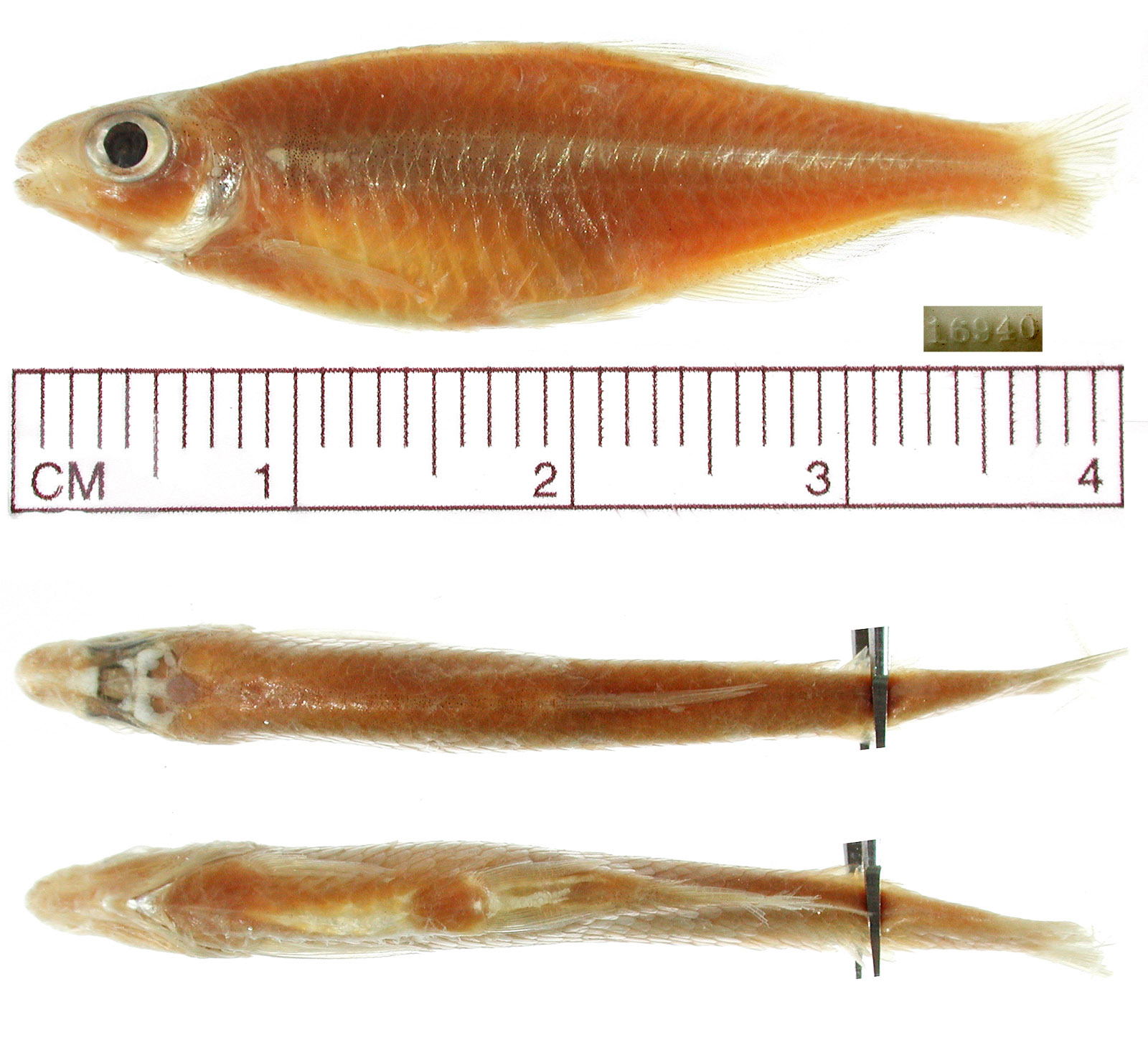
- Preserved specimen

Conservation status
- Least Concern (IUCN 3.1)

Scientific classification
- Kingdom: Animalia
- Phylum: Chordata
- Class: Actinopterygii
- Order: Characiformes
- Family: Stevardiidae
- Subfamily: Diapominae
- Genus: Aulixidens; J. E. Böhlke, 1952
- Species: A. eugeniae

Binomial name
- Aulixidens eugeniae J. E. Böhlke, 1952

= Aulixidens =

Monotypic genus of fishes

Auxidens is a monospecific genus of freshwater ray-finned fish belonging to the family Stevardiidae. The only species in this genus is Aulixidens eugeniae, a characin, endemic to the Orinoco River basin in Venezuela.
