= Diapominae =

Scientific classification
- Kingdom: Animalia
- Phylum: Chordata
- Class: Actinopterygii
- Order: Characiformes
- Family: Stevardiidae
- Subfamily: Diapominae; C. H. Eigenmann, 1909

Type genus
- Diapoma Cope,

Subfamily of fishes

Diapominae is a subfamily of freshwater ray-finned fishes belonging to the family Stevardiidae. The subfamily comprises genera which were previously classified in the family Characidae, but this was split into multiple families in 2024. They are found in South and Central America.

== Genera ==
Diapominae contains the following genera:

- Attonitus Vari & Ortega, 2000
- Aulixidens Böhlke, 1952
- Boehlkea Géry, 1966
- Bryconacidnus Myers, 1929
- Bryconamericus C. H. Eigenmann, 1907
- Ceratobranchia Eigenmann, 1914
- Diapoma Cope, 1894
- Knodus Eigenmann, 1911
- Monotocheirodon Eigenmann & Pearson, 1924
- Othonocheirodus Myers, 1927
- Phallobrycon Menezes, Ferreira & Netto-Ferreira, 2009
- Piabarchus Myers, 1928
- Piabina Reinhardt, 1867
- Rhinobrycon Myers, 1944
- Rhinopetitia Géry, 1964
