= Rhinobrycon =

Conservation status
- Least Concern (IUCN 3.1)

Scientific classification
- Kingdom: Animalia
- Phylum: Chordata
- Class: Actinopterygii
- Order: Characiformes
- Family: Stevardiidae
- Subfamily: Diapominae
- Genus: Rhinobrycon; G. S. Myers, 1944
- Species: R. negrensis

Binomial name
- Rhinobrycon negrensis G. S. Myers, 1944

Species of fish

Rhinobrycon is a monospecific genus of freshwater ray-finned fish belonging to the family Stevardiidae. The only species in this genus is Rhinobrycon negrensis, a characin, which is endemic to Brazil where it is found in the drainage basins of the Rio Negro and the Orinoco.
