= Mimagoniates lateralis =

Conservation status
- Near Threatened (IUCN 3.1)

Scientific classification
- Kingdom: Animalia
- Phylum: Chordata
- Class: Actinopterygii
- Order: Characiformes
- Family: Stevardiidae
- Genus: Mimagoniates
- Species: M. lateralis

Binomial name
- Mimagoniates lateralis (Nichols, 1913)

Synonyms
- Coelurichthys lateralis Nichols, 1913; Coelurichthys tenuis Nichols, 1913

Species of fish

Mimagoniates lateralis is a species of tetra in the genus Mimagoniates. Its common names include croaking tetra (a name also applied to M. inequalis and M. microlepis). The croaking tetra (Mimagoniates lateralis) typically reaches a size of 3–4 cm (1.2–1.6 in) in length, but the maximum length is 3.3 cm (1.3 in) for males and unsexed individuals. Aquarium specimens can sometimes grow slightly larger, reaching up to 5 cm (2.0 in).
