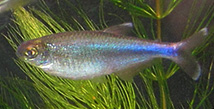
- Cochu's blue tetra (Boehlkea fredcochui)

Scientific classification
- Kingdom: Animalia
- Phylum: Chordata
- Class: Actinopterygii
- Order: Characiformes
- Family: Stevardiidae
- Subfamily: Diapominae
- Genus: Boehlkea; Géry, 1966

Type species
- Boehlkea fredcochui Géry, 1966

= Boehlkea =

Genus of fishes

Boehlkea is a genus of freshwater ray-finned fishes, characins, belonging to the family Stevardiidae. The fishes in this genus are found in the Amazon basin in South America.

== Species ==
Boehlkea contains the following valid species:

- Boehlkea fredcochui Géry, 1966 (Cochu's blue tetra)
- Boehlkea orcesi (J. E. Böhlke, 1958)
- Boehlkea weitzmani Soares, Bertaco, Ito & Zuanon, 2017
