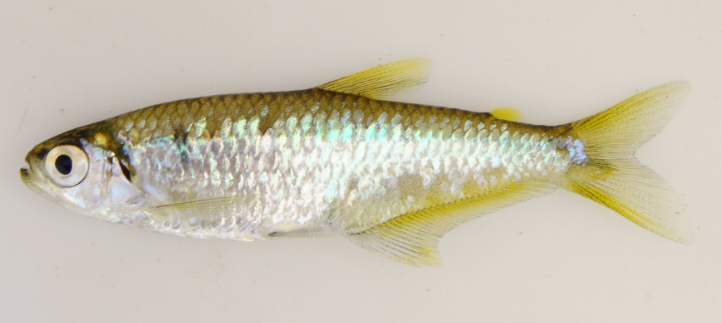
- Diapoma speculiferum

Scientific classification
- Kingdom: Animalia
- Phylum: Chordata
- Class: Actinopterygii
- Order: Characiformes
- Family: Stevardiidae
- Subfamily: Diapominae
- Genus: Diapoma; Cope, 1894

Type species
- Diapoma speculiferum Cope, 1894

Synonyms
- Cyanocharax Malabarba & Weitzman, 2003

= Diapoma =

Genus of fishes

Diapoma is a genus of freshwater ray-finned fishes, characins, belonging to the family Stevardiidae. The fishes in this genus are found in tropical South America.

== Species ==
Diapoma contains the following valid species:

- Diapoma alburnus (Hensel, 1870)
- Diapoma alegretense (Malabarba & Weitzman, 2003)
- Diapoma dicropotamicum (Malabarba & Weitzman, 2003)
- Diapoma guarani (Mahnert & Géry, 1987)
- Diapoma itaimbe (Malabarba & Weitzman, 2003)
- Diapoma lepiclastum (Malabarba, Weitzman & Casciotta, 2003)
- Diapoma nandi Vanegas‐Ríos, Azpelicueta & Malabarba, 2018
- Diapoma obi (Casciotta, Almirón, Piálek & Říĉan, 2012)
- Diapoma pampeana Ito, Carvalho, Pavanelli, Vanegas-Ríos & Malabarba, 2022
- Diapoma potamohadros Ito, Carvalho, Pavanelli, Vanegas-Ríos & Malabarba, 2022
- Diapoma pyrrhopteryx Menezes & Weitzman, 2011
- Diapoma speculiferum Cope, 1894
- Diapoma terofali (Géry, 1964)
- Diapoma thauma Menezes & Weitzman, 2011
- Diapoma tipiaia (Malabarba & Weitzman, 2003)
- Diapoma uruguayensis (Messner, 1962)
