= Caiapobrycon =

Conservation status
- Least Concern (IUCN 3.1)

Scientific classification
- Kingdom: Animalia
- Phylum: Chordata
- Class: Actinopterygii
- Order: Characiformes
- Family: Stevardiidae
- Subfamily: Creagrutinae
- Genus: Caiapobrycon; L. R. Malabarba & Vari, 2000
- Species: C. tucurui

Binomial name
- Caiapobrycon tucurui L. R. Malabarba & Vari, 2000

Species of fish

Caiapobrycon is a monospecific genus of freshwater ray-finned fish belonging to the family Stevardiidae. The only species in this genus is Caiapobrycon tucurui, a characin, which is endemic to the Rio Tocantins and Rio Araguaia river systems in the states of Goiás, Mato Grosso, Pará and Tocantins, as well as in the Federal District. The specific name refers to the town of Tucuruí, the type locality. This is a small fish with a maximum standard length of 4.5 cm (1.8 in).
