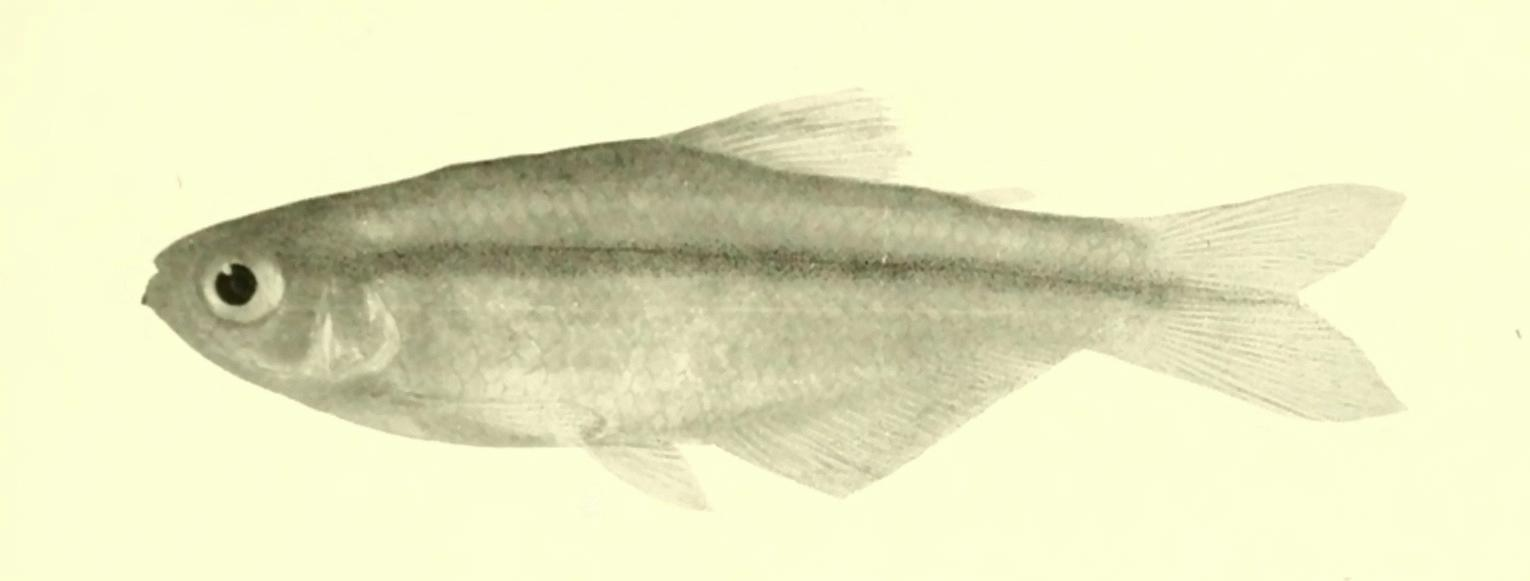
- Glandulocauda melanopleura

Scientific classification
- Kingdom: Animalia
- Phylum: Chordata
- Class: Actinopterygii
- Order: Characiformes
- Family: Stevardiidae
- Subfamily: Glandulocaudinae; C. H. Eigenmann, 1914

Type genus
- Glandulocauda C. H. Eigenmann, 1911

= Glandulocaudinae =

Subfamily of fishes

Glandulocaudinae is a subfamily of freshwater ray-finned fishes belonging to the family Stevardiidae. The subfamily comprises genera which were previously classified in the family Characidae, but this was split into multiple families in 2024. They are found in South and Central America.

== Genera ==
Glandulocaudinae contains the following genera:

- Glandulocauda C. H. Eigenmann, 1911
- Lophiobrycon R. M. C .Castro, A. C. Ribeiro, Benine & A. L. A. Melo, 2003
- Mimagoniates Regan, 1907
