= Bryconamericus indefessus =

Conservation status
- Vulnerable (IUCN 3.1)

Scientific classification
- Kingdom: Animalia
- Phylum: Chordata
- Class: Actinopterygii
- Order: Characiformes
- Family: Stevardiidae
- Genus: Bryconamericus
- Species: B. indefessus

Binomial name
- Bryconamericus indefessus (Mirande, G. Aguilera & Azpelicueta, 2004)

Synonyms
- Nans indefessus Mirande, Aguilera & Azpelicueta, 2004; Nantis indefessus (Mirande, Aguilera & Azpelicueta, 2004)

Species of fish

Bryconamericus indefessus is a species of freshwater ray-finned fish, a characin, belonging to the family Stevardiidae. This fish is endemic to Argentina, where it is found in the Rio Bermejo basin.
