= Othonocheirodus =

Conservation status
- Least Concern (IUCN 3.1)

Scientific classification
- Kingdom: Animalia
- Phylum: Chordata
- Class: Actinopterygii
- Order: Characiformes
- Family: Stevardiidae
- Subfamily: Diapominae
- Genus: Othonocheirodus; G. S. Myers, 1927
- Species: O. eigenmanni

Binomial name
- Othonocheirodus eigenmanni G. S. Myers, 1927

Species of fish

Othonocheirodus is a monospecific genus of freshwater ray-finned fish belonging to the family Stevardiidae. The only species in this genus is Othonocheirodus eigenmanni, a characin, endemic to Peru, where it is found in the Amazon River basin. Specimens labelled as referring to this species collected in Ecuador need to have their identifications confirmed. This taxon has a maximum standard length of 4.7 cm (1.9 in).
