= Mimagoniates inequalis =

Conservation status
- Least Concern (IUCN 3.1)

Scientific classification
- Kingdom: Animalia
- Phylum: Chordata
- Class: Actinopterygii
- Order: Characiformes
- Family: Stevardiidae
- Genus: Mimagoniates
- Species: M. inequalis

Binomial name
- Mimagoniates inequalis (C. H. Eigenmann, 1911)

Synonyms
- Glandulocauda inequalis C. H. Eigenmann, 1911

Species of fish

Mimagoniates inequalis, known as the croaking tetra (a common name also applied to M. lateralis and M. microlepis), is a species of tetra in the genus Mimagoniates. It was previously classified as Glandulocauda inequalis. Croaking tetras, specifically M. microlepis, typically reach sizes of 5–6 cm (2.0–2.4 in) in length, though captive individuals can grow larger, up to 9 cm (3.5 in). Another species, M. inequalis, is smaller, with males and unsexed fish reaching a maximum length of 3.3 cm (1.3 in) SL.
