= Creagrutinae =

Scientific classification
- Kingdom: Animalia
- Phylum: Chordata
- Class: Actinopterygii
- Order: Characiformes
- Family: Stevardiidae
- Subfamily: Creagrutinae; Miles, 1943

Type genus
- Creagrutus Günther, 1864

Subfamily of fishes

Creagrutinae is a subfamily of freshwater ray-finned fishes, belonging to the family Stevardiidae. The subfamily comprises genera which were previously classified in the family Characidae, but this was split into multiple families in 2024. They are found in South and Central America.

== Genera ==
Creagrutinae contains the following genera:

- Caiapobrycon L. R. Malabarba & Vari, 2000
- Carlastyanax Géry, 1972
- Creagrutus Günther, 1864
- Microgenys C. H. Eigenmann 1913
