= Bryconamericus lethostigmus =

Conservation status
- Least Concern (IUCN 3.1)

Scientific classification
- Kingdom: Animalia
- Phylum: Chordata
- Class: Actinopterygii
- Order: Characiformes
- Family: Stevardiidae
- Genus: Bryconamericus
- Species: B. lethostigmus

Binomial name
- Bryconamericus lethostigmus (A. L. Gomes, 1947)

Synonyms
- Odontostoechus lethostigmus Gomes, 1947

Species of fish

Bryconamericus lethostigmus is a species of freshwater ray-finned fish, a characin, belonging to the family Stevardiidae. This fish is endemic to Brazil, where it is found in the basins of the Maquiné, Tres Forquilhas and Mampituba Rivers. It is retained in the monotypic genus Odontostoechus by some authorities.
