= Bryconacidnus =

Scientific classification
- Kingdom: Animalia
- Phylum: Chordata
- Class: Actinopterygii
- Order: Characiformes
- Family: Stevardiidae
- Subfamily: Diapominae
- Genus: Bryconacidnus; G. S. Myers, 1929

Type species
- Hyphessobrycon ellisi N. E. Pearson, 1924

Genus of fishes

Bryconacidnus is a genus of freshwater ray-finned fishes, characins, belonging to the family Stevardiidae. The fishes in this genus are found in tropical South America.

== Species ==
Bryconacidnus contains the following valid species:

- Bryconacidnus ellisi (N. E. Pearson, 1924)
- Bryconacidnus hemigrammus (N. E. Pearson, 1924)
- Bryconacidnus paipayensis (N. E. Pearson, 1929)
- Bryconacidnus pectinatus (Vari & Siebert, 1990)
