= Ceratobranchia =

Scientific classification
- Kingdom: Animalia
- Phylum: Chordata
- Class: Actinopterygii
- Order: Characiformes
- Family: Stevardiidae
- Subfamily: Diapominae
- Genus: Ceratobranchia; C. H. Eigenmann, 1914

Type species
- Ceratobranchia obtusirostris C. H. Eigenmann 1914

Genus of fishes

Ceratobranchia is a genus of freshwater ray-finned fishes, characins, belonging to the family Stevardiidae. The fishes in this genus are found in tropical South America.

== Species ==
Ceratobranchia contains the following valid species:

- Ceratobranchia binghami C. H. Eigenmann, 1927
- Ceratobranchia delotaenia Chernoff & Machado-Allison, 1990
- Ceratobranchia elatior Tortonese, 1942
- Ceratobranchia joanae Chernoff & Machado-Allison, 1990
- Ceratobranchia obtusirostris C. H. Eigenmann, 1914
