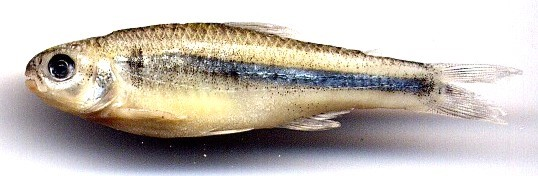
- Microgenys minuta, one of the 3 currently recognized species of Microgenys.

Scientific classification
- Kingdom: Animalia
- Phylum: Chordata
- Class: Actinopterygii
- Order: Characiformes
- Family: Stevardiidae
- Subfamily: Creagrutinae
- Genus: Microgenys; C. H. Eigenmann, 1913

Type species
- Microgenys minutus C. H. Eigenmann, 1913

= Microgenys =

Genus of fishes

Microgenys is a genus of freshwater ray-finned fishes, characins, belonging to the family Stevardiidae. The fishes in this genus are found in tropical South America.

== Species ==
Microgenys contains the following valid species:

- Microgenys lativirgata N. E. Pearson, 1927
- Microgenys minuta C. H. Eigenmann, 1913
- Microgenys weyrauchi Fowler, 1945
