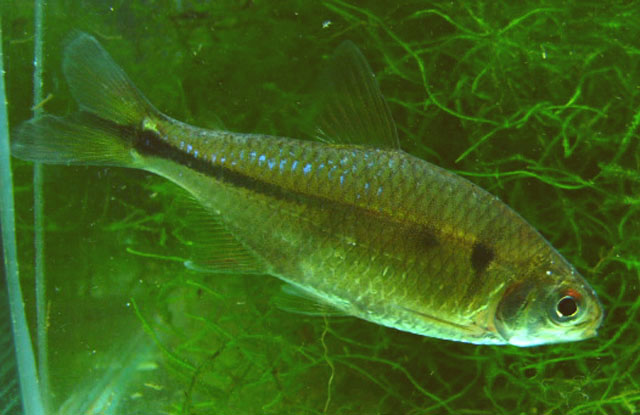
- Bryconamericus iheringii

Scientific classification
- Kingdom: Animalia
- Phylum: Chordata
- Class: Actinopterygii
- Order: Characiformes
- Family: Stevardiidae
- Subfamily: Diapominae
- Genus: Bryconamericus; C. H. Eigenmann, 1907

Type species
- Bryconamericus exodon C. H. Eigenmann, 1907

Synonyms
- Hypobrycon M. C. S. L. Malabarba & L. R. Malabarba, 1994; Nans Mirande, Aguilera & Azpelicueta, 2004; Nantis Mirande, Aguilera & Azpelicueta, 2006; Odontostoechus Gomes, 1947

= Bryconamericus =

Genus of fishes

Bryconamericus is a genus of freshwater ray-finned fishes, characins, belonging to the family Stevardiidae. The fishes in this genus are found in Central and South America.

== Species ==
Bryconamericus contains the following valid species:

- Bryconamericus abalio Román-Valencia, Ruiz-C. & Taphorn, 2023
- Bryconamericus agna Azpelicueta & Almirón, 2001
- Bryconamericus bolivianus N. E. Pearson, 1924
- Bryconamericus bucayensis Román-Valencia, Ruiz-C., Taphorn & García-Alzate, 2013
- Bryconamericus carlosi Román-Valencia, 2003
- Bryconamericus charalae Román-Valencia, 2005
- Bryconamericus coeruleus Jerep & Shibatta, 2017
- Bryconamericus ecai J. F. P. da Silva, 2004
- Bryconamericus eigenmanni (Evermann & Kendall, 1906)
- Bryconamericus exodon C. H. Eigenmann, 1907
- Bryconamericus guizae César Román-Valencia, 2003
- Bryconamericus guyanensis Zarske, Le Bail & Géry, 2010
- Bryconamericus huilae César Román-Valencia, 2003
- Bryconamericus hyphesson C. H. Eigenmann, 1909
- Bryconamericus icelus Dahl, 1964
- Bryconamericus iheringii (Boulenger, 1887)
- Bryconamericus ikaa Casciotta, Almirón & Azpelicueta, 2004
- Bryconamericus indefessus (Mirande, G. Aguilera & Azpelicueta, 2004)
- Bryconamericus lambari L. R. Malabarba & Kindel, 1995
- Bryconamericus lambayequensis César Román-Valencia & Taphorn, 2023
- Bryconamericus lassorum César Román-Valencia, 2002
- Bryconamericus leptorhynchus (J. F. P. da Silva & Malabarba, 1996)
- Bryconamericus lethostigmus (A. L. Gomes, 1947)
- Bryconamericus macrophthalmus César Román-Valencia, 2003
- Bryconamericus maromba (M. C. S. L. Malabarba & L. R. Malabarba, 1994)
- Bryconamericus mennii Miquelarena, Protogino, Filiberto & H. L. López, 2002
- Bryconamericus microcephalus (A. Miranda-Ribeiro, 1908)
- Bryconamericus misei Pedroso, Deprá & Pavanelli, 2024
- Bryconamericus motatanensis L. P. Schultz, 1944
- Bryconamericus novae C. H. Eigenmann & Henn, 1914
- Bryconamericus orinocoensis César Román-Valencia, 2003
- Bryconamericus ornaticeps Bizerril & Peres-Neto, 1995
- Bryconamericus oroensis César Román-Valencia, Ruiz-C., Taphorn & García-Alzate, 2013
- Bryconamericus osgoodi C. H. Eigenmann & Allen, 1942
- Bryconamericus pachacuti C. H. Eigenmann, 1927
- Bryconamericus parapetiensis Román-Valencia, Ruiz-C. & Taphorn, 2023
- Bryconamericus patriciae J. F. P. da Silva, 2004
- Bryconamericus phoenicopterus (Cope, 1872)
- Bryconamericus pinnavittatus D'Agosta & Netto-Ferreira, 2015
- Bryconamericus poi (Almirón, Casciotta, Azpelicueta & Cione, 2001)
- Bryconamericus pyahu Azpelicueta, Casciotta & Almirón, 2003
- Bryconamericus rubropictus (C. Berg, 1901)
- Bryconamericus singularis Román-Valencia, Taphorn & Ruiz-C., 2008
- Bryconamericus subtilisform Román-Valencia, 2003
- Bryconamericus sylvicola Braga, 1998
- Bryconamericus tenuis Bizerril & P. M. C. Araújo, 1992
- Bryconamericus turiuba Langeani, Z. M. S. de Lucena, Pedrini & Tarelho-Pereira, 2005
- Bryconamericus uporas Casciotta, Azpelicueta & Almirón, 2002
- Bryconamericus yokiae Román-Valencia, 2003
- Bryconamericus ytu Almirón, Azpelicueta & Casciotta, 2004
- Bryconamericus zamorensis Román-Valencia, Ruiz-C., Taphorn & García-Alzate, 2013

Bryconamericus lethostigmus is sometimes allocated to the monotypic genus Odontostoechus.
