= Piabina =

Scientific classification
- Kingdom: Animalia
- Phylum: Chordata
- Class: Actinopterygii
- Order: Characiformes
- Family: Stevardiidae
- Subfamily: Diapominae
- Genus: Piabina; Reinhardt, 1867

Type species
- Piabina argentea Reinhardt, 1867

Genus of fishes

Piabina is a genus of freshwater ray-finned fishes, characins, belonging to the family Stevardiidae. The fishes in this genus are found in tropical South America.

== Species ==
Piabina contains the following valid species:

- Piabina anhembi J. F. P. da Silva & Kaefer, 2003
- Piabina argentea Reinhardt, 1867
- Piabina thomasi (Fowler, 1940)
