= Lophiobrycon =

Conservation status
- Endangered (IUCN 3.1)

Scientific classification
- Kingdom: Animalia
- Phylum: Chordata
- Class: Actinopterygii
- Order: Characiformes
- Family: Stevardiidae
- Genus: Lophiobrycon; R. M. C. Castro, A. C. Ribeiro, Benine & A. L. A. Melo, 2003
- Species: L. weitzmani

Binomial name
- Lophiobrycon weitzmani R. M. C. Castro, A. C. Ribeiro, Benine & A. L. A. Melo, 2003

Species of fish

Lophiobrycon is a monospecific genus of freshwater ray-finned fish belonging to the family Stevardiidae. The only species in the genus is Lophiobrycon weitzmani, which is a species of small characin endemic to Brazil, where it is found in the upper Paraná River basin. It is considered threatened by Brazil's Ministry of the Environment. This taxon is closely related to Glandulocauda and Mimagoniates (together they form the tribe Glandulocaudini).

It is named in honor of Stanley H. Weitzman, with the Smithsonian Institution, for his "seminal" work on the systematics of neotropical characiformes, particularly the subfamily Glandulocaudinae (now subsumed into Stevardiinae).
