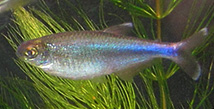

Scientific classification
- Kingdom: Animalia
- Phylum: Chordata
- Class: Actinopterygii
- Order: Characiformes
- Family: Stevardiidae
- Genus: Boehlkea
- Species: B. fredcochui

Binomial name
- Boehlkea fredcochui Géry, 1966

= Cochu's blue tetra =

Species of fish

Boehlkea fredcochui, also known as the Cochu's blue tetra, is a species of characin. Its natural range is in the Amazon Basin. It is commonly kept as an aquarium fish.

It is named in honor of tropical fish importer Ferdinand (Fred) Cochu of the Paramount Aquarium, who introduced this species to the aquarium hobby around 1956.

== Aquarium care ==
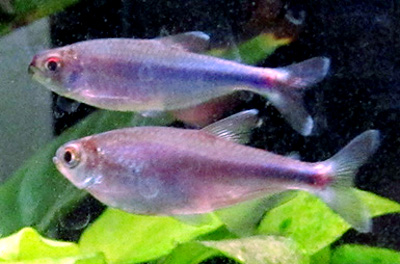
Boehlkea fredcochui, male and female

Growing to a maximum length of 5.5 cm (2.2 in) in total length, the blue tetra has a blue and pink colour.

Its temperature preference is to about 22–27 °C (71.6–80.6 °F), and its pH preference is 6 to 7.5 pH. Its hardness preference is about soft to medium (less than 15ºd), and its salinity preference is no salt. Its compatibility is generally peaceful, though it may nip fins during feeding or when stressed. Its lifespan is typically two to three years. Its ease of keeping is easy, and its ease of breeding is very hard.

As for other schooling characins, the cochu's blue tetra should always be kept in groups of at least six. A very active fish, it requires open areas in which to swim, and is best kept in aquariums 90 cm (35 in) or larger. Aggression is generally limited to conspecifics in appropriate setups, but they may harass other fish in too small a tank, or without enough other tetras.

Spawning may occur in home setups, with the eggs being scattered over fine leafed plants. Soft, acidic water is required for hatching to occur.

Males may be differentiated from females by their slimmer, more streamlined form and more intense colouration.
