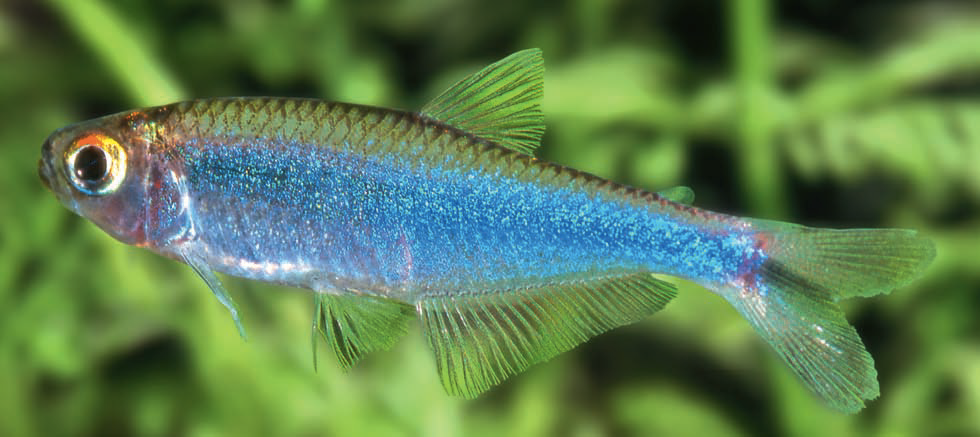

Conservation status
- Data Deficient (IUCN 3.1)

Scientific classification
- Kingdom: Animalia
- Phylum: Chordata
- Class: Actinopterygii
- Order: Characiformes
- Family: Stevardiidae
- Genus: Knodus
- Species: K. borki

Binomial name
- Knodus borki Zarske, 2008

= Knodus borki =

Species of fish

Knodus borki is a species of characin endemic to Peru, where it is found in the vicinity of Iquitos. It is found in a freshwater environment within a benthopelagic depth range. This species is native to a tropical environment. It lives in the habitats of rivers, streams, and tributaries.

K. borki reaches about 2 in (5.1 cm) in length. It is one of several species known by the common name "blue tetra".

It is named in honor of German aquarist Dieter Bork, who "contributed much to the development of aquariology as a dedicated aquarium friend (breeder, author and photographer)"; he also supplied the type specimen.
